= Caryatid =

Load-bearing pillar in the figure of a female, Ancient Greece and later

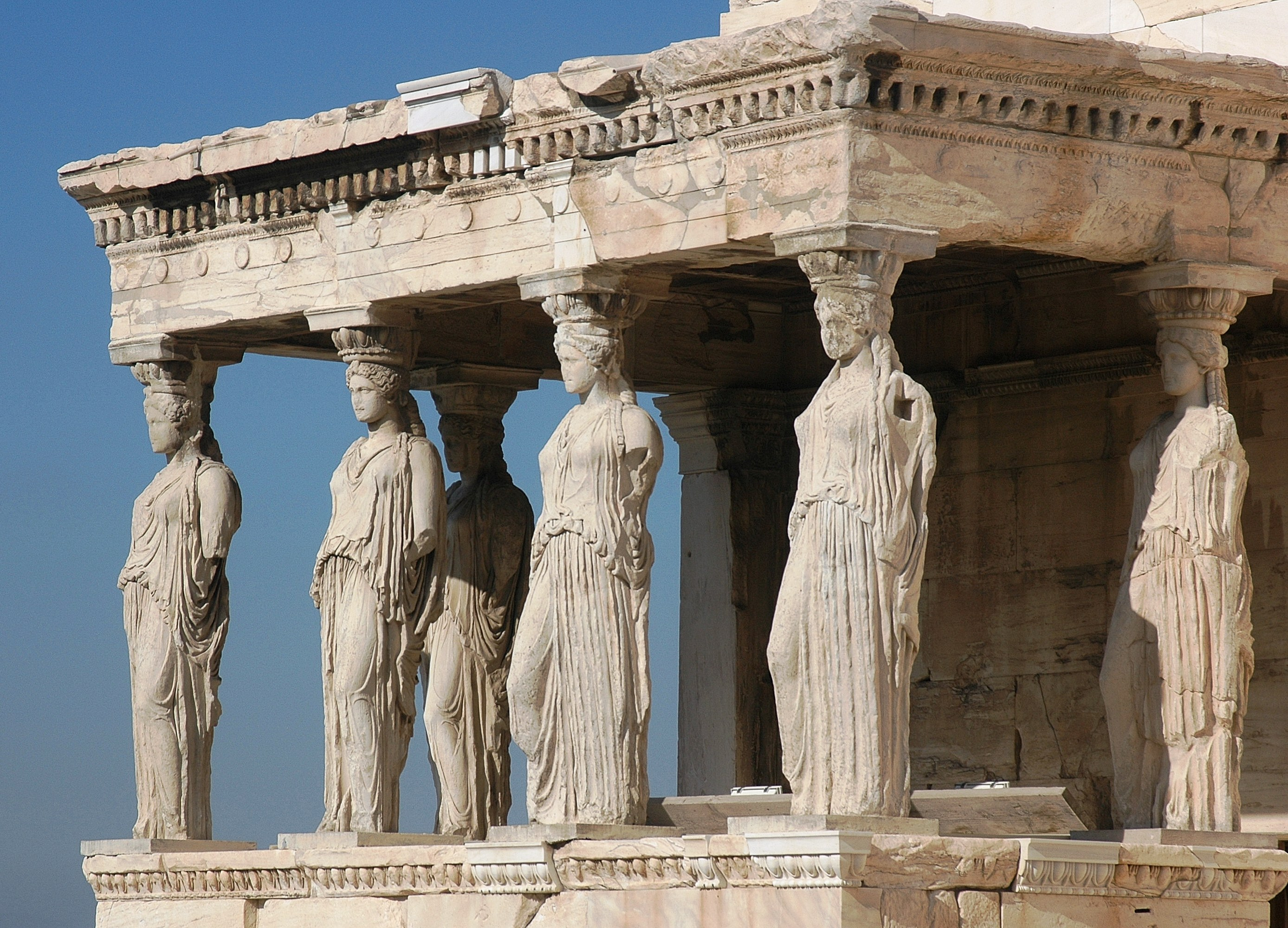
The caryatid porch of the Erechtheion in Athens, Greece. These are now replicas. The originals are in the Acropolis Museum (with one in the British Museum).

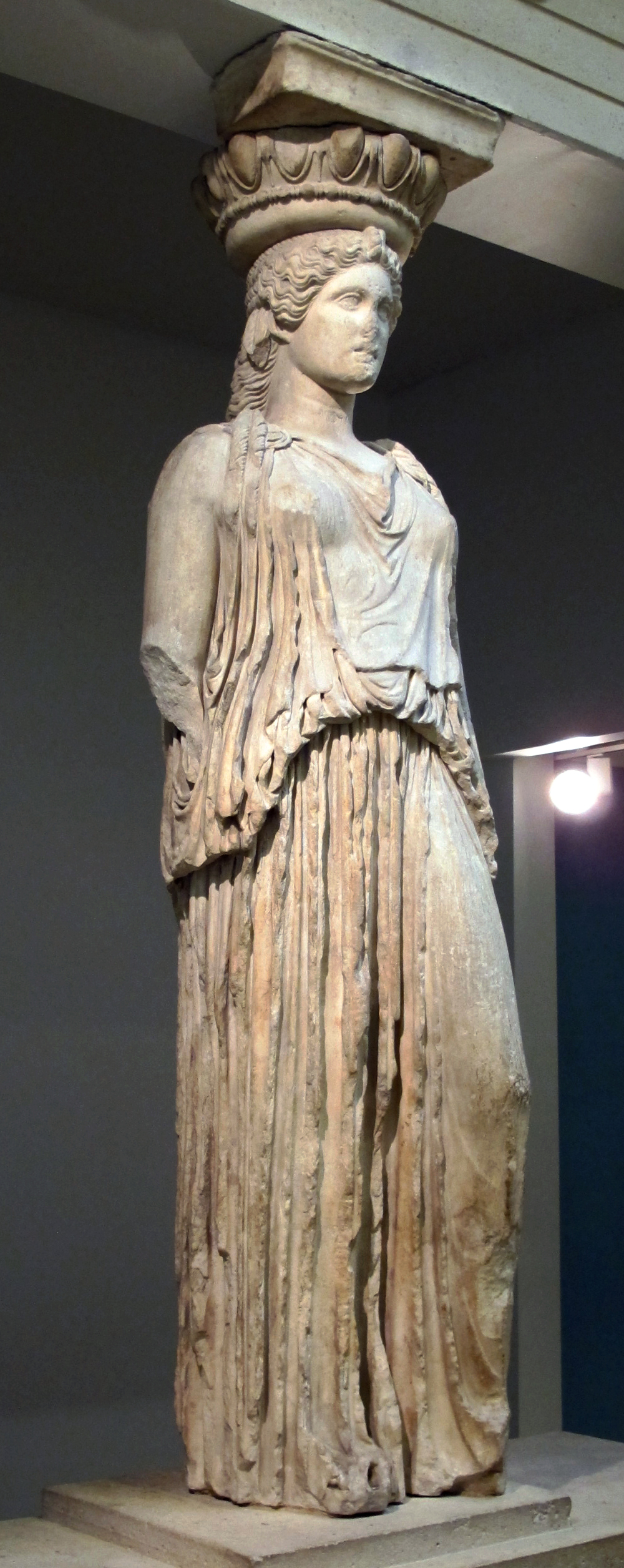
The caryatid standing in contrapposto, originally part of the Erechtheion, was removed by Lord Elgin and is now displayed at the British Museum

A caryatid (/ˌkɛəriˈætɪd, ˌkær-/ KAIR-ee-AT-id, KARR-; Ancient Greek: Καρυᾶτις, romanized: Karuâtis; pl. Καρυάτιδες, Karuátides) is a sculpted female figure serving as an architectural support taking the place of a column or a pillar supporting an entablature on her head. The Greek term karyatides literally means "maidens of Karyai", an ancient town on the Peloponnese. Karyai had a temple dedicated to the goddess Artemis in her aspect of Artemis Karyatis: "As Karyatis she rejoiced in the dances of the nut-tree village of Karyai, those Karyatides, who in their ecstatic round-dance carried on their heads baskets of live reeds, as if they were dancing plants".

An atlas or atlantid or telamon is a male version of a caryatid, i.e., a sculpted male statue serving as an architectural support.

== Etymology ==
The term is first recorded in the Latin form caryatides by the Roman architect Vitruvius. He stated in his 1st-century BC work De architectura (I.1.5) that certain female figures represented the punishment of the women of Caryae, a town near Sparta in Laconia, who were condemned to slavery after betraying Athens by siding with Persia in the Greco-Persian Wars. However, Vitruvius's explanation is doubtful; well before the Persian Wars, female figures were used as decorative supports in Greece and the ancient Near East. Vitruvius's explanation is dismissed as an error by Camille Paglia in Glittering Images and not even mentioned by Mary Lefkowitz in Black Athena Revisited. They both say the term refers to young women worshipping Artemis in Caryae through dance. Lefkowitz says that the term "comes from the Spartan city of Caryae, where young women did a ring dance around an open-air statue of the goddess Artemis, locally identified with a walnut tree". Bernard Sergent specifies that the dancers came to the small town of Caryae from nearby Sparta. Nevertheless, the association of caryatids with slavery persists and is prevalent in Renaissance art.

The ancient Caryae supposedly was one of the six adjacent villages that united to form the original township of Sparta, and the hometown of Menelaos' queen, Helen of Troy. Girls from Caryae were considered especially beautiful, strong, and capable of giving birth to strong children.

A caryatid supporting a basket on her head is called a canephora ("basket-bearer"), representing one of the maidens who carried sacred objects used at feasts of the goddesses Athena and Artemis. The Erectheion caryatids, in a shrine dedicated to an archaic king of Athens, may therefore represent priestesses of Artemis in Caryae, a place named for the "nut-tree sisterhood" – apparently in Mycenaean times, like other plural feminine toponyms, such as Hyrai or Athens itself.

The later male counterpart of the caryatid is referred to as a telamon (plural telamones) or atlas (plural atlantes) – the name refers to the legend of Atlas, who bore the sphere of the heavens on his shoulders. Such figures were used on a monumental scale, notably in the Temple of Olympian Zeus in Agrigento, Sicily.

== Ancient usage ==
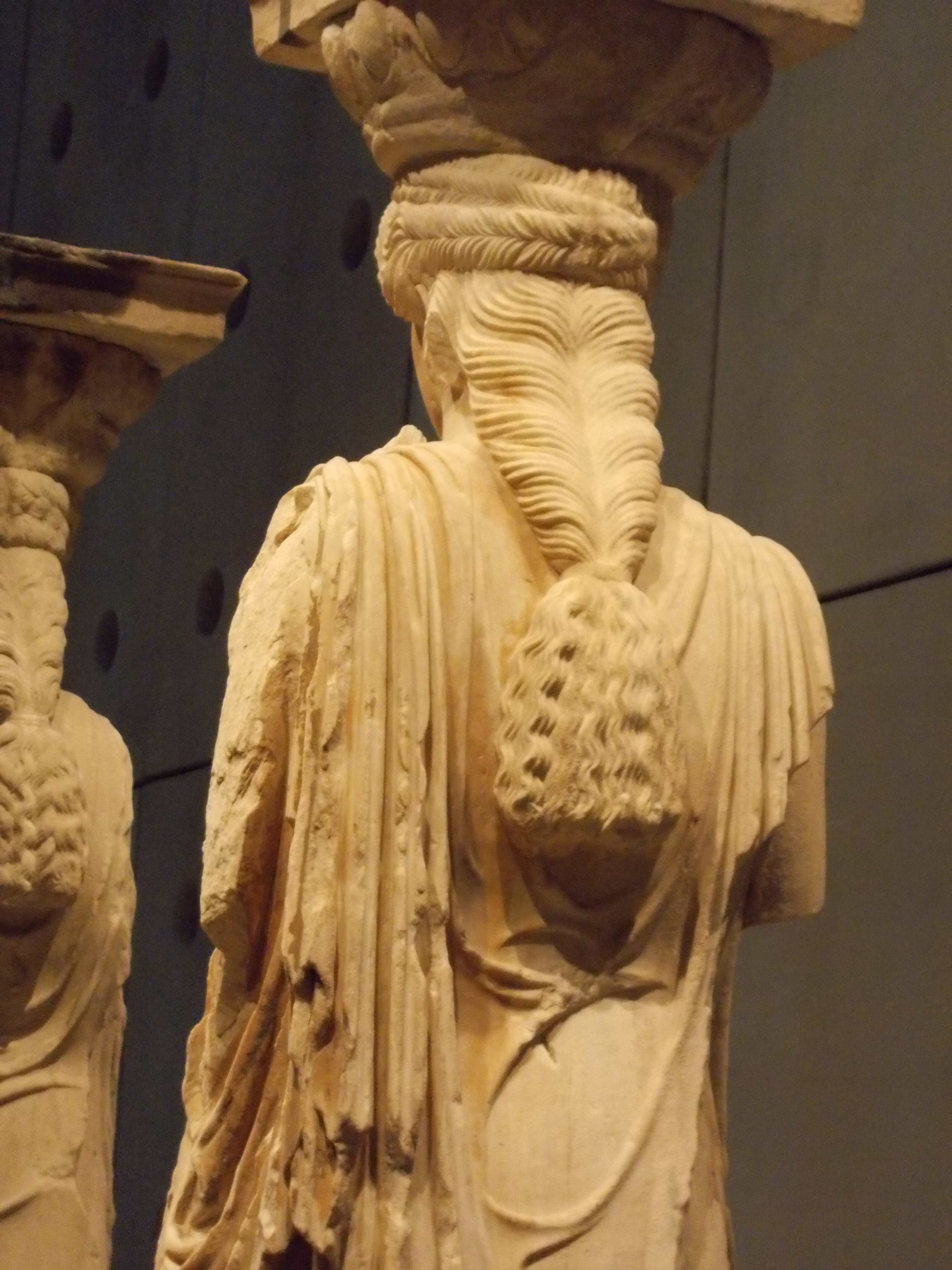
Intricate hairstyle of caryatid, displayed at the Acropolis Museum in Athens

Some of the earliest known examples were found in the treasuries of Delphi, including that of Siphnos, dating to the 6th century BC. However, their use as supports in the form of women can be traced back even earlier, to ritual basins, ivory mirror handles from Phoenicia, and draped figures from archaic Greece.

The best-known and most-copied examples are the six figures of the Caryatid porch of the Erechtheion on the Acropolis in Athens. One of these original six figures was removed by Lord Elgin in the early 19th century, an action that caused significant damage to the temple. The figure is currently held in the British Museum in London. The Greek government does not recognise the British Museum's claim of ownership over any part of the Acropolis monuments, and the return of the Caryatid, along with other monuments commonly known as the Elgin Marbles, to Athens has been the subject of an ongoing international dispute. The Acropolis Museum holds the other five figures, which are replaced onsite by replicas. The five originals that are in Athens are now being exhibited in the new Acropolis Museum, on a special balcony that allows visitors to view them from all sides. The pedestal for the caryatid removed to London remains empty, awaiting its return. From 2011 to 2015, they were cleaned by a specially constructed laser beam, which removed accumulated soot and grime without harming the marble's patina. Each caryatid was cleaned in place, with a television circuit relaying the spectacle live to museum visitors.

Although of the same height and build, and similarly attired and coiffed, the six Caryatids are not the same: their faces, stance, draping, and hair are carved separately; the three on the left stand on their right foot, while the three on the right stand on their left foot. Their bulky, intricately arranged hairstyles serve the crucial purpose of providing static support to their necks, which would otherwise be the thinnest and structurally weakest part.

The Romans also copied the Erechtheion caryatids, installing copies in the Forum of Augustus and the Pantheon in Rome, and at Hadrian's Villa at Tivoli. Another Roman example, found on the Via Appia, is the Townley Caryatid.

== Renaissance and after ==
In Early Modern times, the practice of integrating caryatids into building facades was revived, and in interiors they began to be employed in fireplaces, which had not been a feature of buildings in Antiquity and offered no precedents. Early interior examples are the figures of Heracles and Iole carved on the jambs of a monumental fireplace in the Sala della Jole of the Doge's Palace, Venice, about 1450. In the following century Jacopo Sansovino, both sculptor and architect, carved a pair of female figures supporting the shelf of a marble chimneypiece at Villa Garzoni, near Padua. No architect mentioned the device until 1615, when Palladio's pupil Vincenzo Scamozzi included a chapter devoted to chimneypieces in his Idea della archittura universale. Those in the apartments of princes and important personages, he considered, might be grand enough for chimneypieces with caryatid supporters, such as one he illustrated and a similar one he installed in the Sala dell'Anticollegio, also in the Doge's Palace.

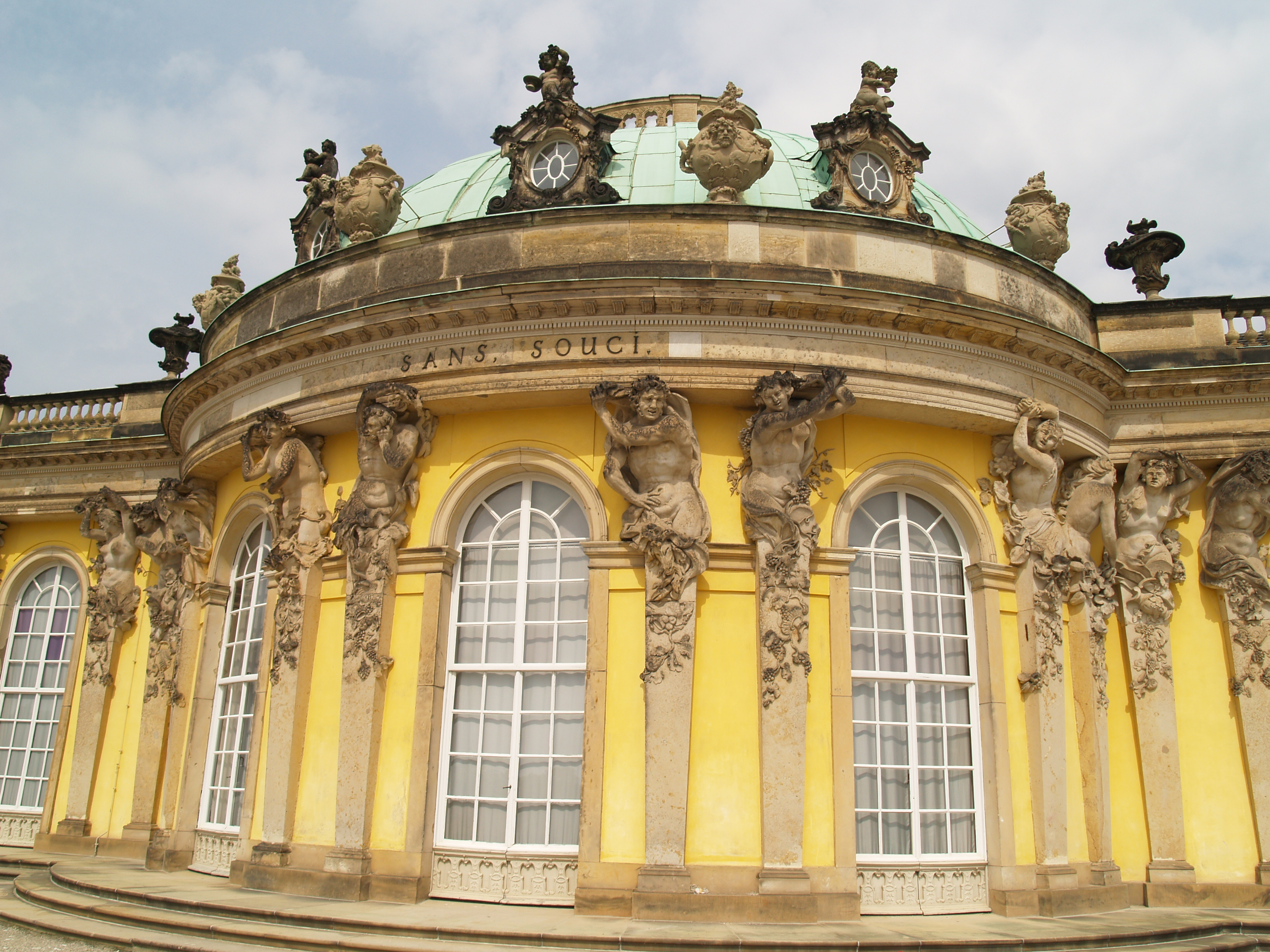
Late Baroque caryatid and atlantid hemi-figures at Sanssouci, Frederick the Great's summer palace at Potsdam

In the 16th century, from the examples engraved for Sebastiano Serlio's treatise on architecture, caryatids became a fixture in the decorative vocabulary of Northern Mannerism expressed by the Fontainebleau School and the engravers of designs in Antwerp. In the early 17th century, interior examples appear in Jacobean interiors in England; in Scotland the overmantel in the great hall of Muchalls Castle remains an early example. Caryatids remained part of the German Baroque vocabulary and were refashioned in more restrained and "Grecian" forms by neoclassical architects and designers, such as the four terracotta caryatids on the porch of St Pancras New Church, London (1822).

Many caryatids lined up on the facade of the 1893 Palace of the Arts housing the Museum of Science and Industry in Chicago. In the arts of design, the draped figure supporting an acanthus-grown basket capital taking the form of a candlestick or a table-support is a familiar cliché of neoclassical decorative arts. The John and Mable Ringling Museum of Art in Sarasota has caryatids as a motif on its eastern facade.

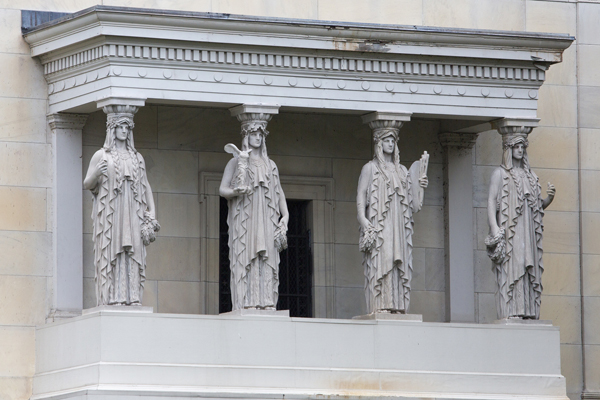
St. Gaudens' caryatids of the Albright–Knox Art Gallery, Buffalo, USA

In 1905 American sculptor Augustus Saint Gaudens created a caryatid porch for the Albright–Knox Art Gallery in Buffalo, New York in which four of the eight figures (the other four figures holding only wreaths) represented a different art form, Architecture, Painting, Sculpture, and Music.

Auguste Rodin's 1881 sculpture Fallen Caryatid Carrying her Stone (part of his monumental The Gates of Hell work) shows a fallen caryatid. Robert Heinlein described this piece in Stranger in a Strange Land: "Now here we have another emotional symbol ... for almost three thousand years or longer, architects have designed buildings with columns shaped as female figures ... After all those centuries it took Rodin to see that this was work too heavy for a girl ... Here is this poor little caryatid who has tried—and failed, fallen under the load. ... She didn't give up, Ben; she's still trying to lift that stone after it has crushed her".

In Act 2 of his 1953 play Waiting for Godot, author Samuel Beckett has Estragon say "We are not caryatids!" when he and Vladimir tire of "cart(ing) around" the recently blinded Pozzo.

Agnes Varda made two short films documenting Caryatid columns around Paris.

- 1984 Les Dites Cariatides
- 2005 Les Dites Cariatides Bis

The musical group Son Volt evoke the caryatides and their burden borne in poetic metaphor on the song "Caryatid Easy" from their 1997 album Straightaways, with singer Jay Farrar reproving an unidentified lover with the line "you play the caryatid easy".

== Gallery ==
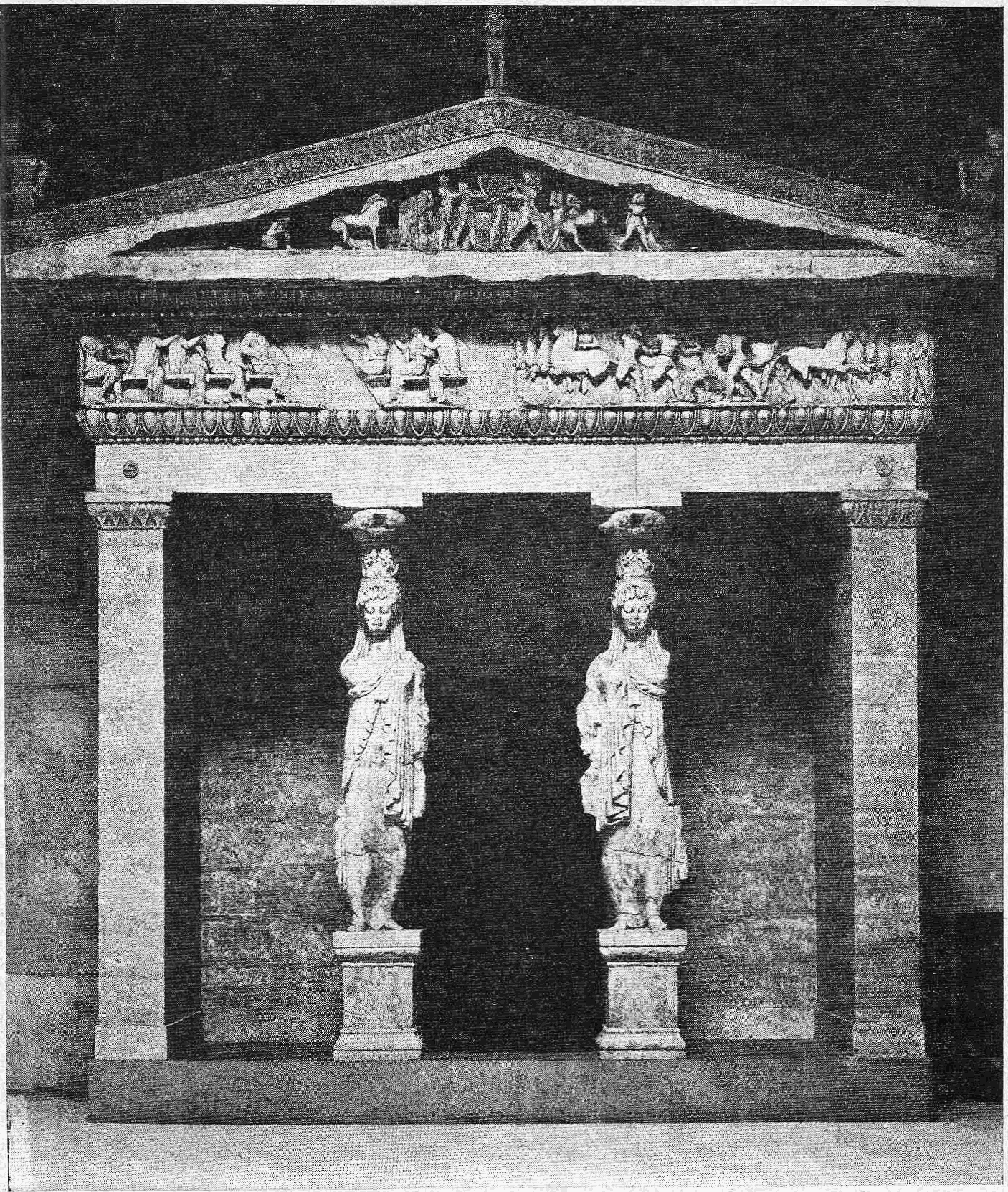
Ancient Greek caryatids of the Cnidian Treasury, c.550 BC, probably marble, Delphi Archaeological Museum, Delphi, Greece

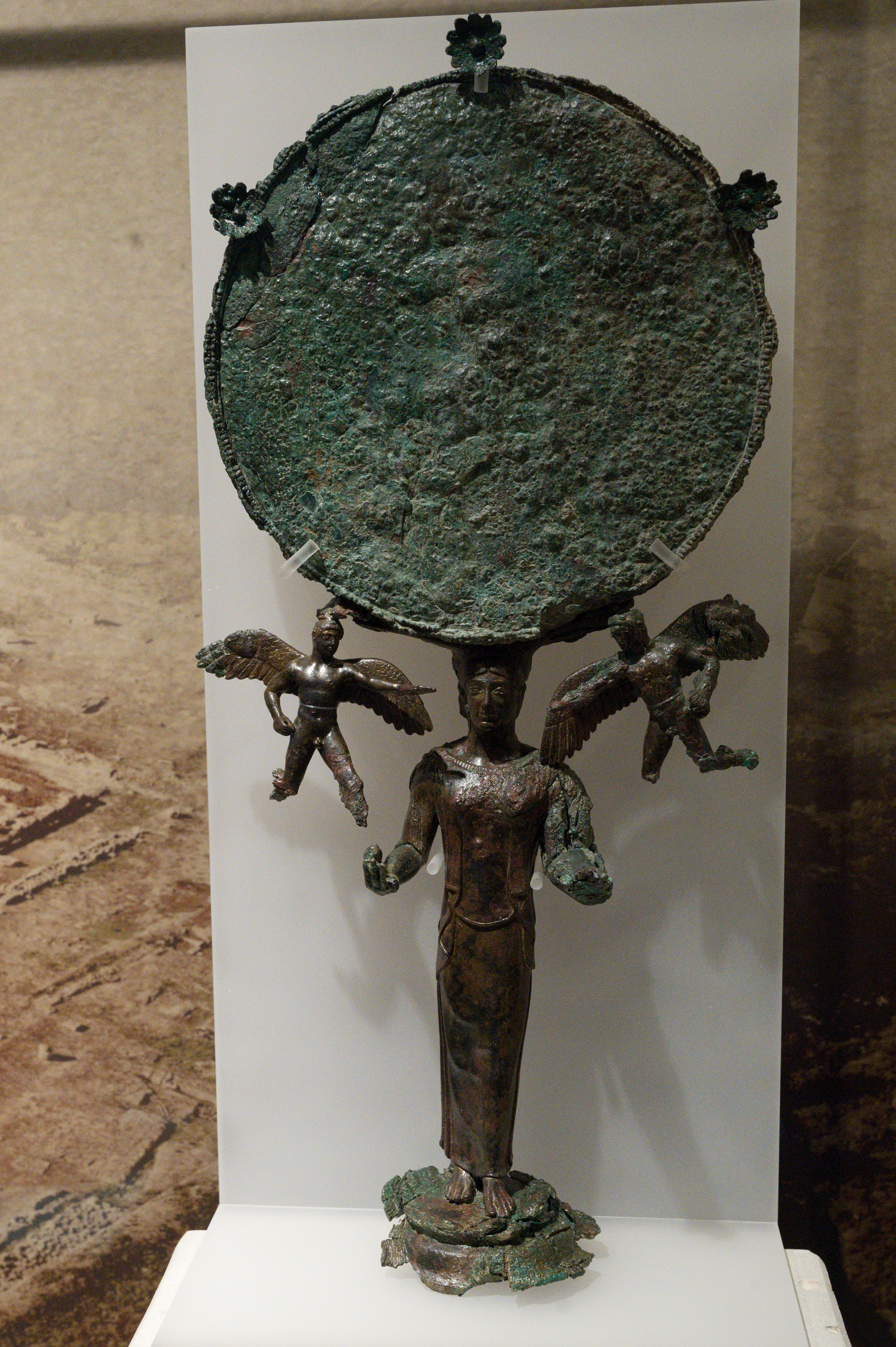
Ancient Greek mirror, 5th century BC, bronze, Archaeological Museum of Ancient Corinth, Corinth, Greece

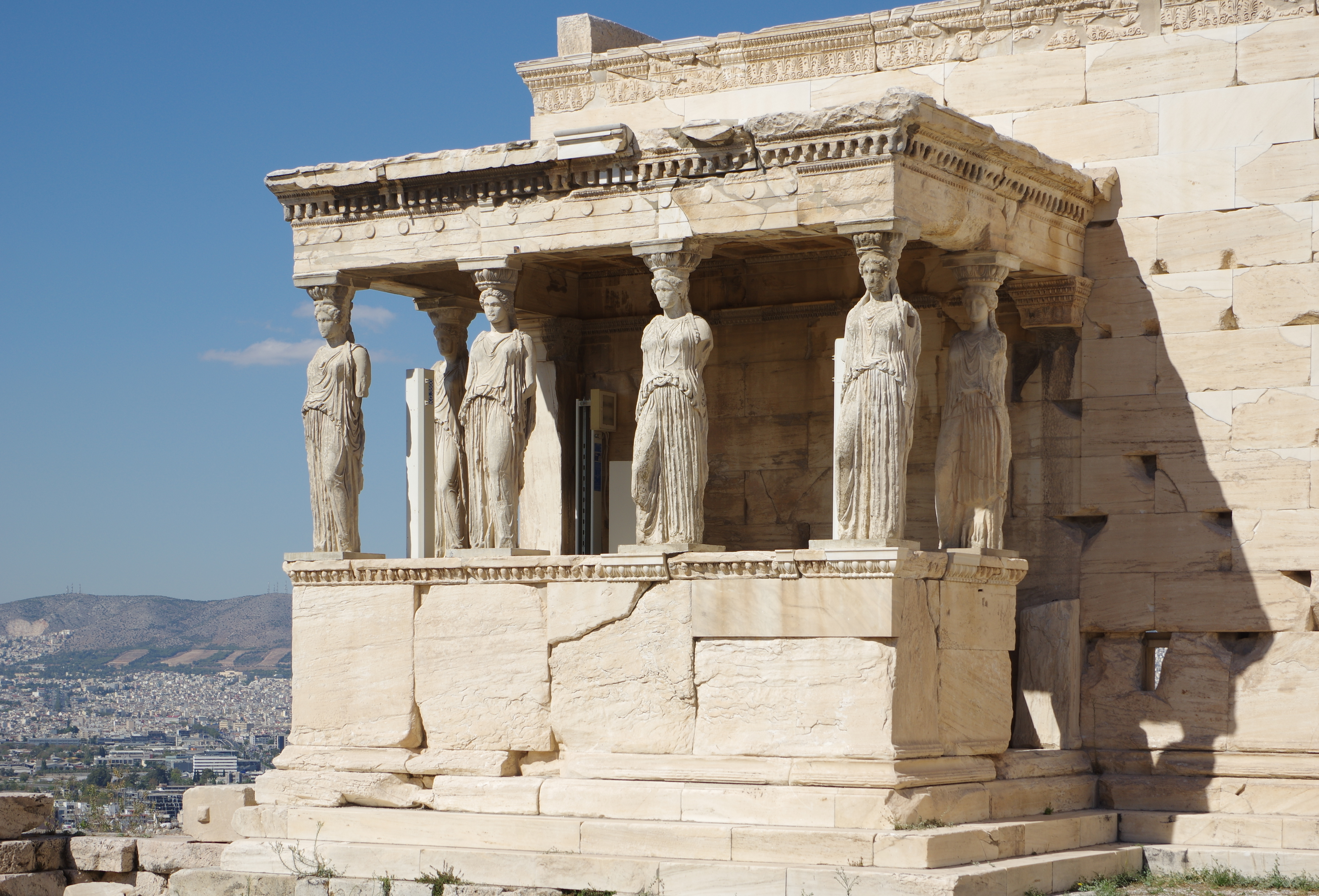
Ancient Greek caryatids of the Erechtheion, Greece, unknown architect, 421–405 BC

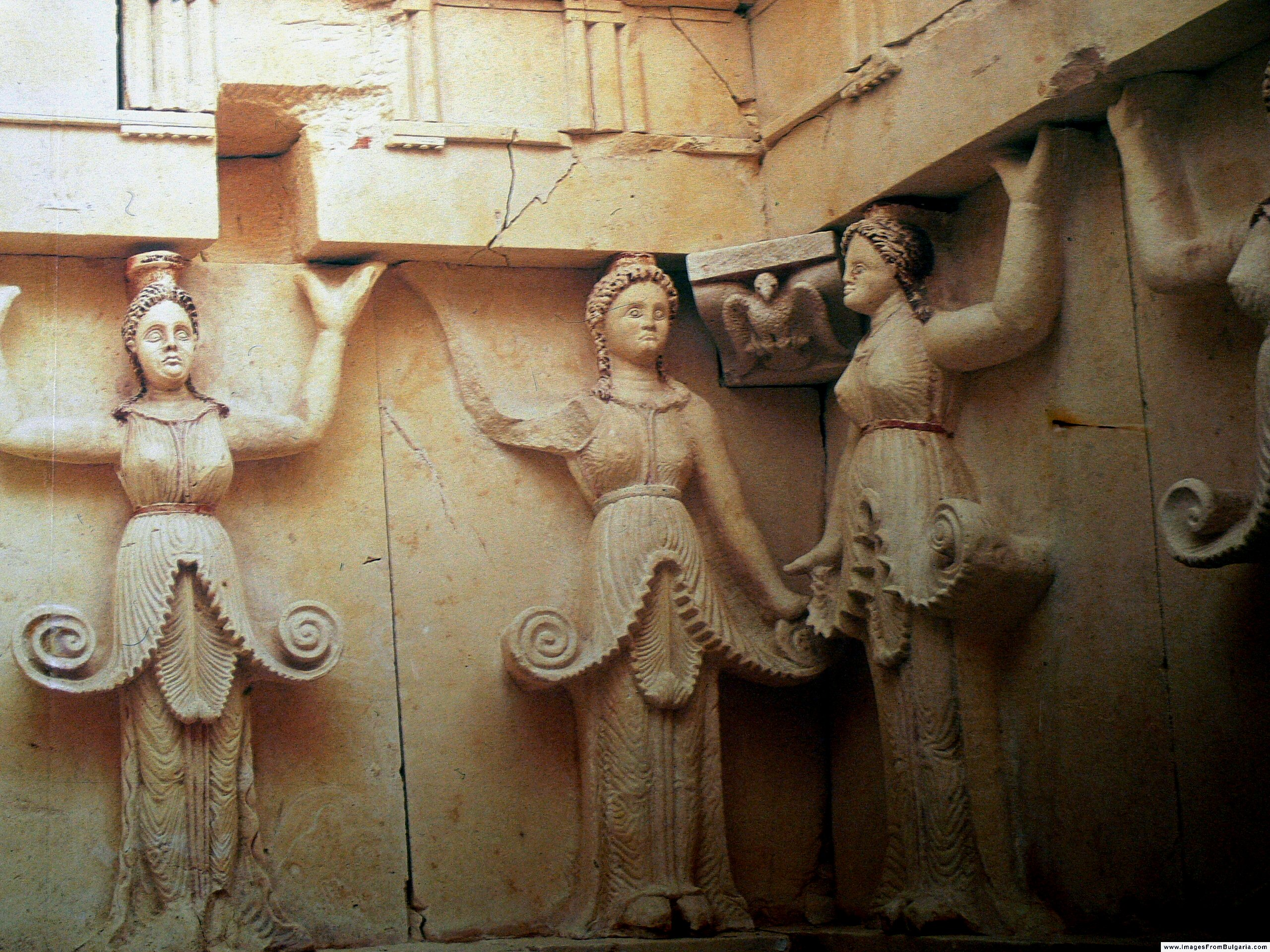
Ten female caryatids carved in high relief on the walls of the central chamber of the Thracian Tomb of Sveshtari, first quarter of the 3rd century BC, southwest of the village of Sveshtari, Razgrad Province, Bulgaria.

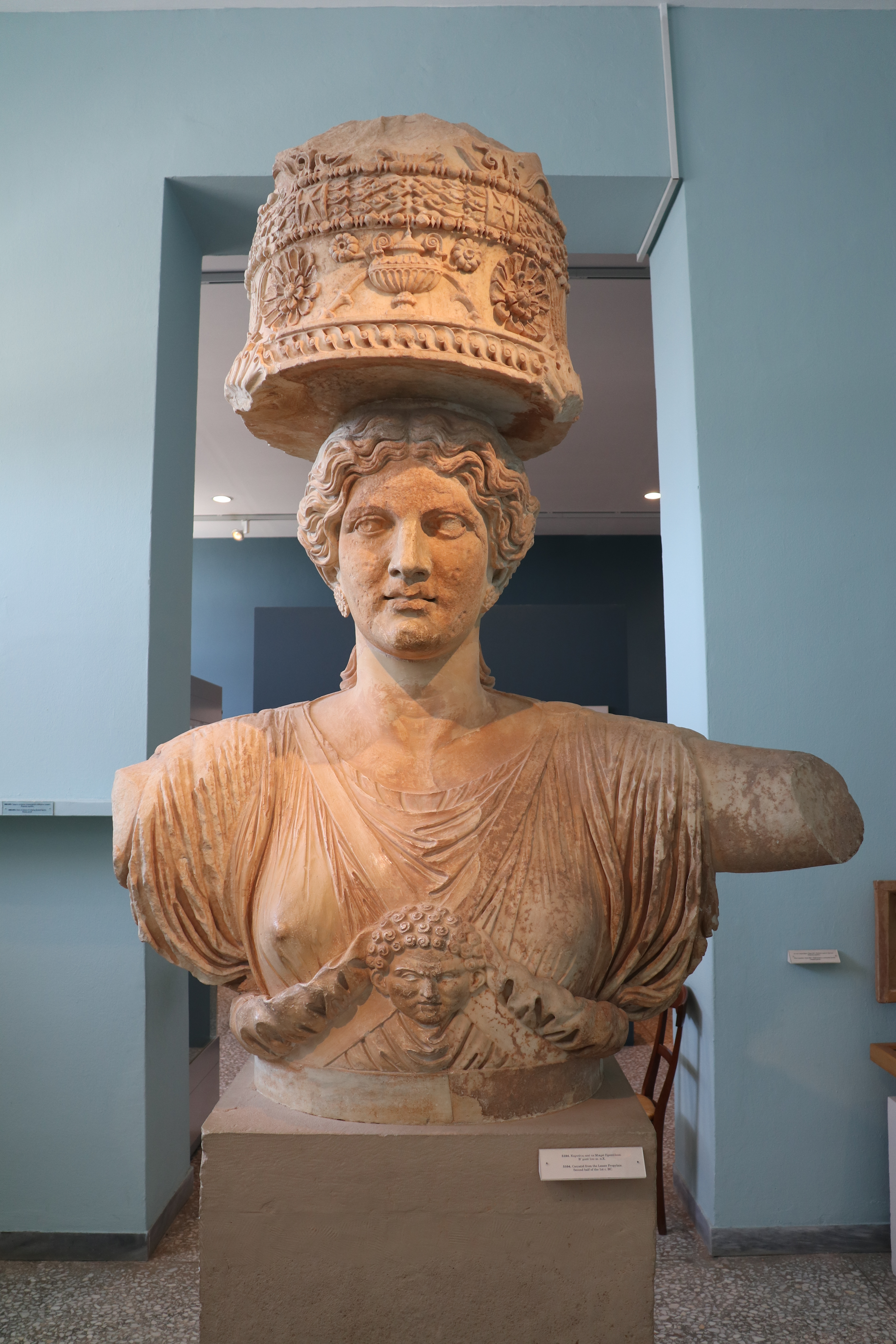
Roman caryatid from the Sanctuary of Demeter at Eleusis, second half of 1st century BC, probably marble, Archaeological Museum of Eleusis, Elefsina, Greece

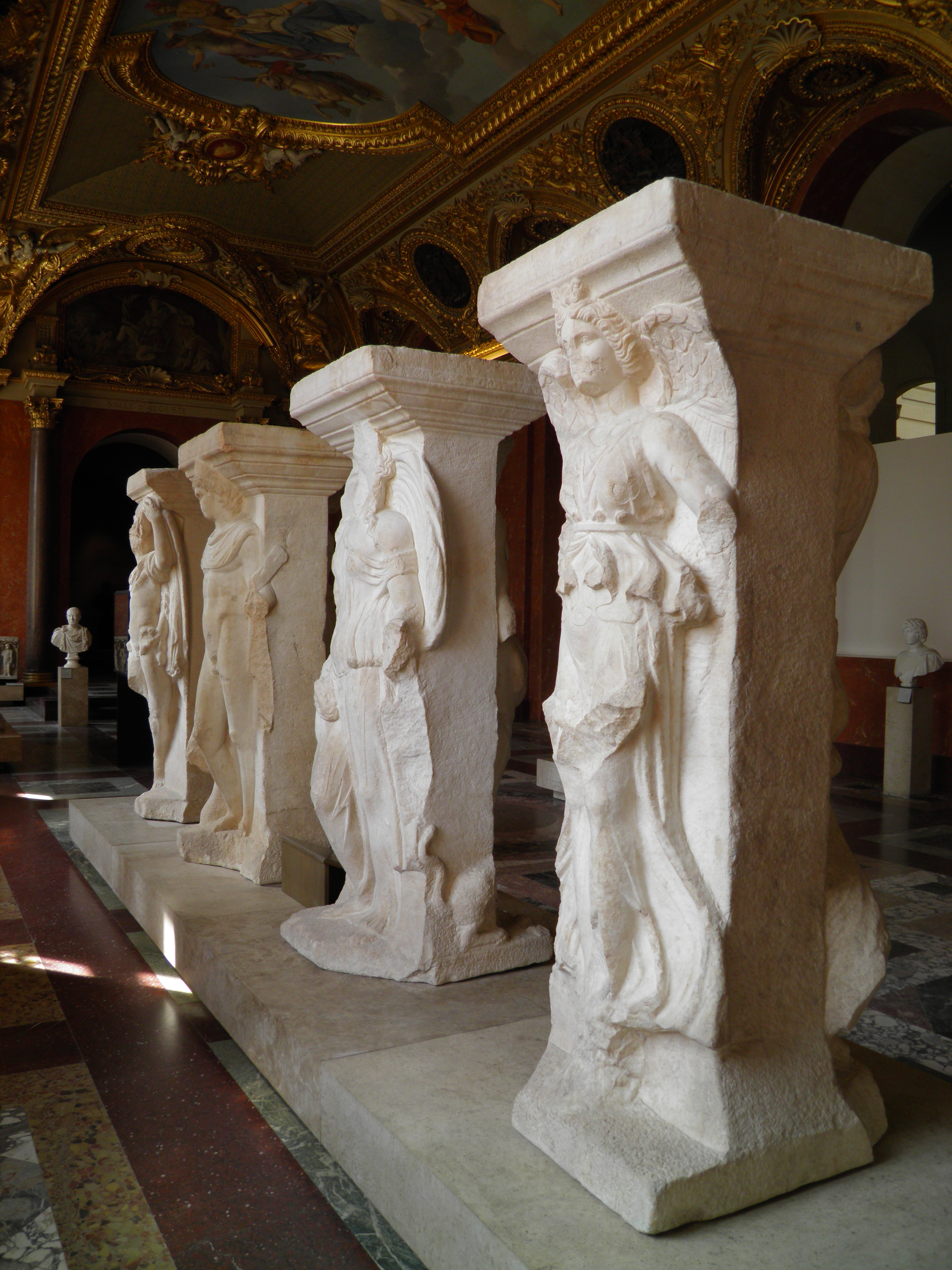
Las Incantadas, a group of Roman sculptures from a portico that once adorned the Roman Forum of Thessalonica, 150–230 AD, marble, Louvre

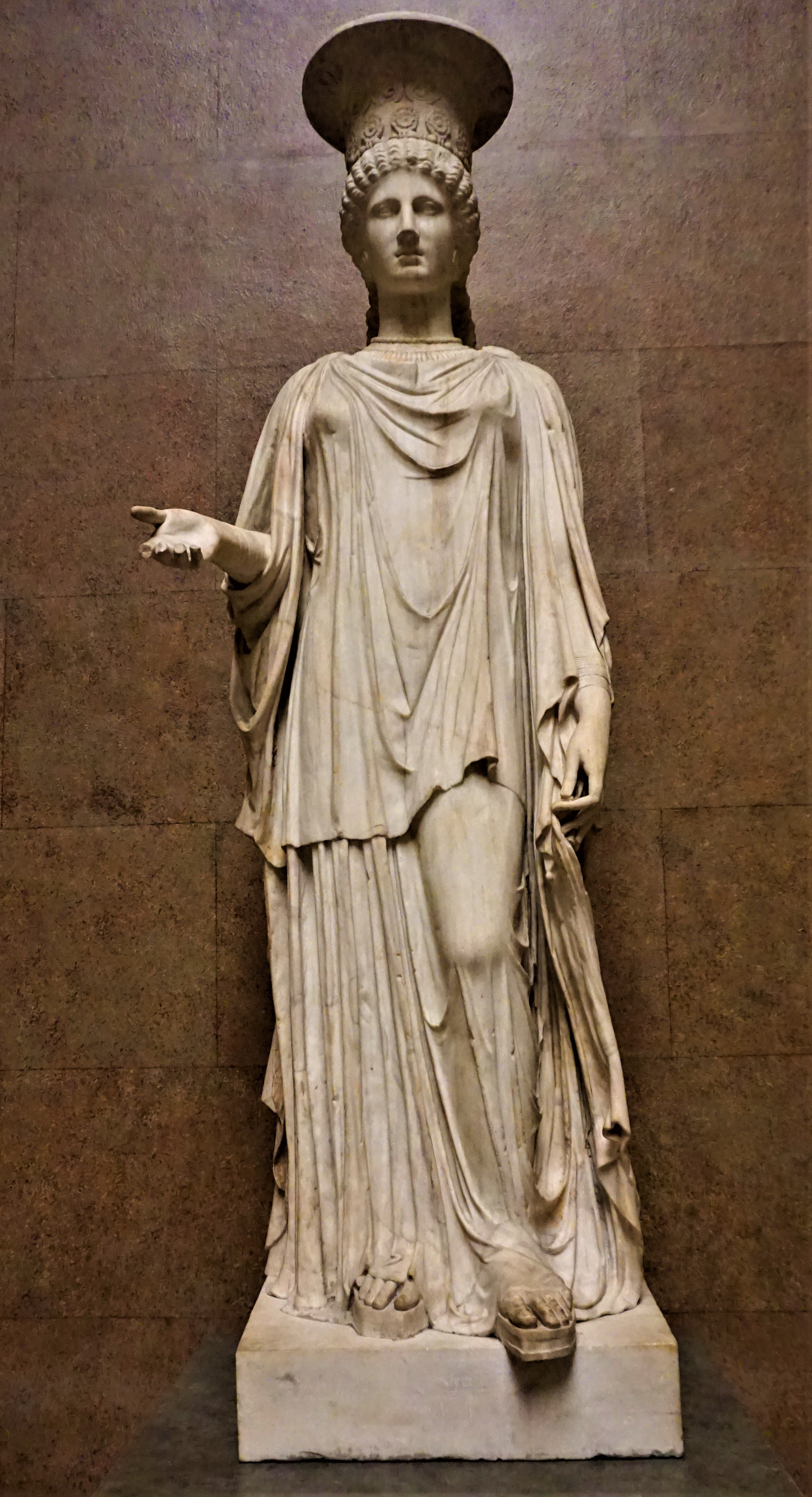
Townley Caryatid, 161–171, Pentelic marble, British Museum, London

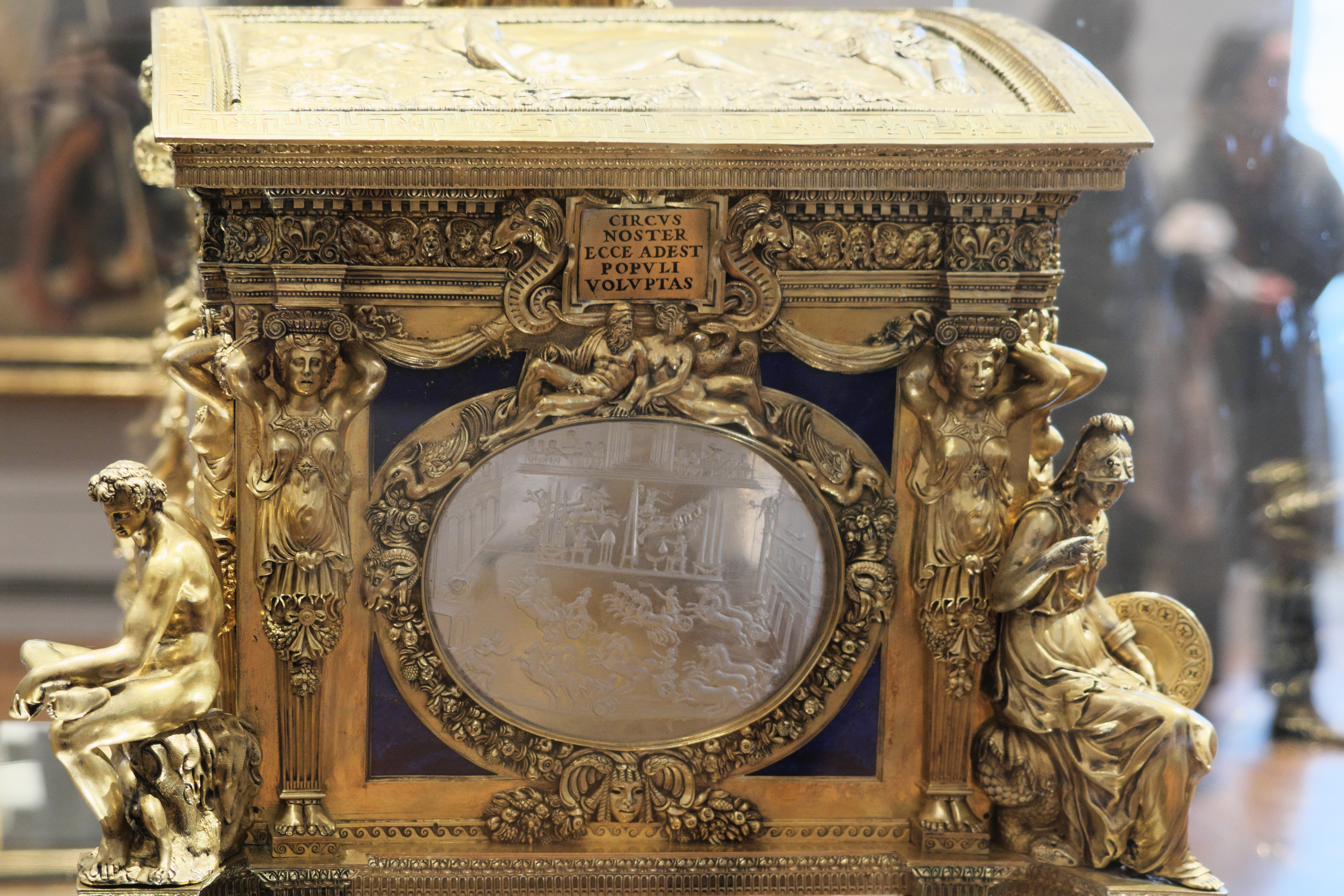
Renaissance caryatids on the Cassetta Farnese, by Manno Sbarri, Giovanni Bernardi and Perin del Vaga, 1548–1561, gilded silver, embossed and chiselled rock crystal, enamel and lapis lazuli, Louvre

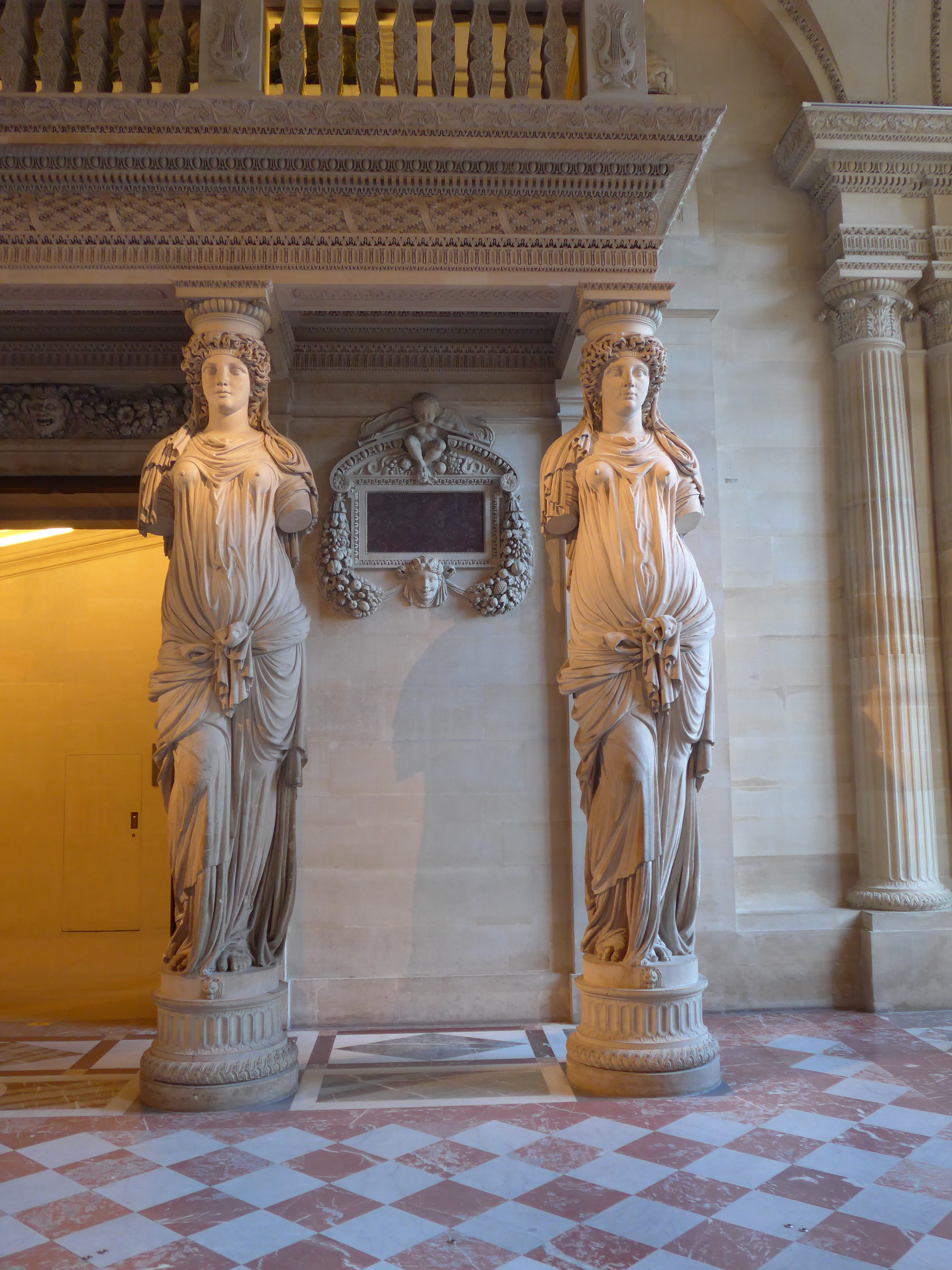
Renaissance caryatids of the musicians' loft in the Louvre Palace, Paris, by Jean Goujon, 1550

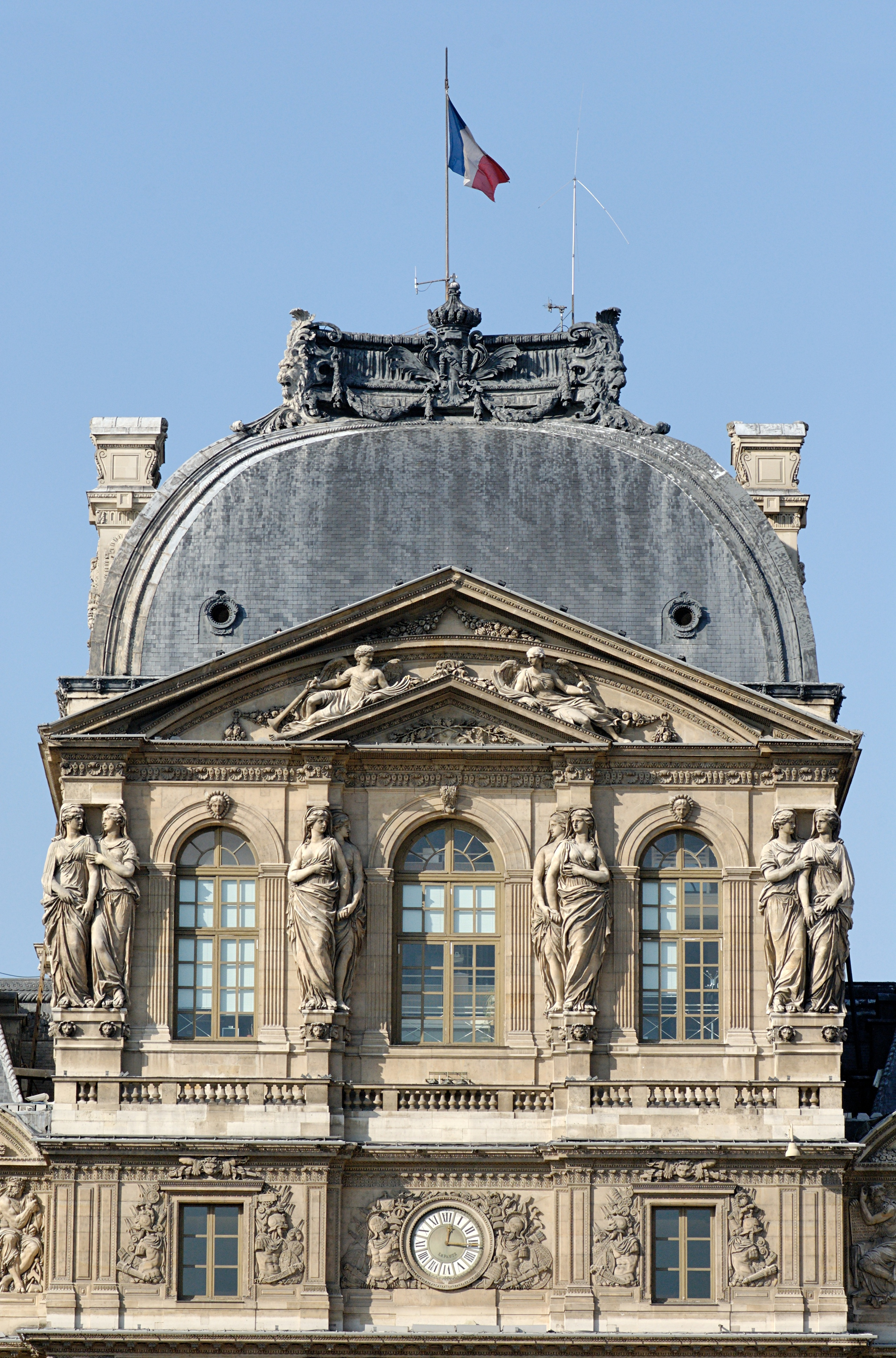
Baroque caryatids on the upper part of the Pavillon de l'Horloge on the Cour Carrée of the Louvre Palace, by Gilles Guérin and Philippe De Buyster after Jacques Sarazin, mid-17th century

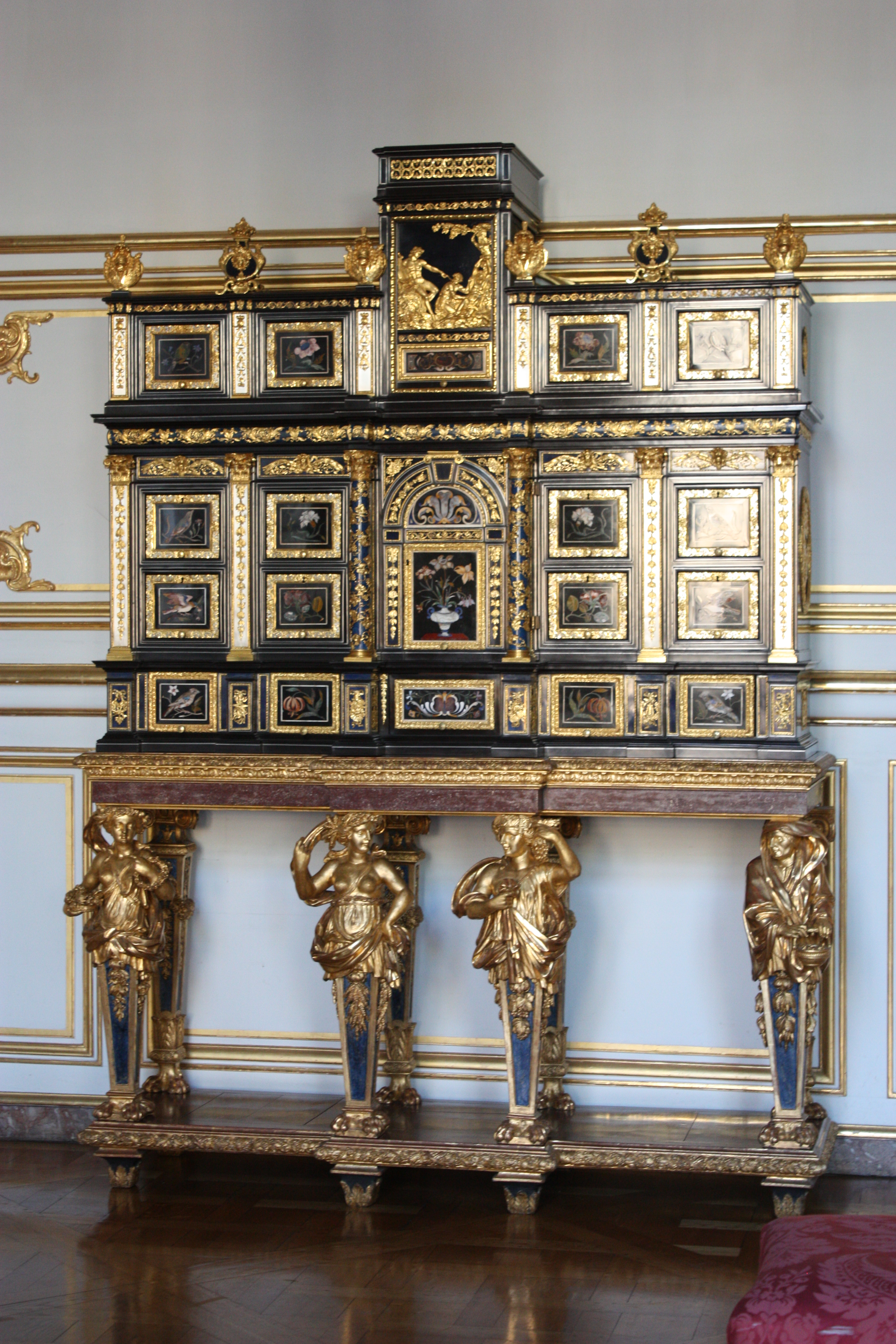
Baroque caryatids of a cabinet, c. 1675, ebony, kingwood, marquetry of hard stones, gilt bronze, pewter, glass, tinted mirror and horn, Museum of Decorative Art, Strasbourg, France

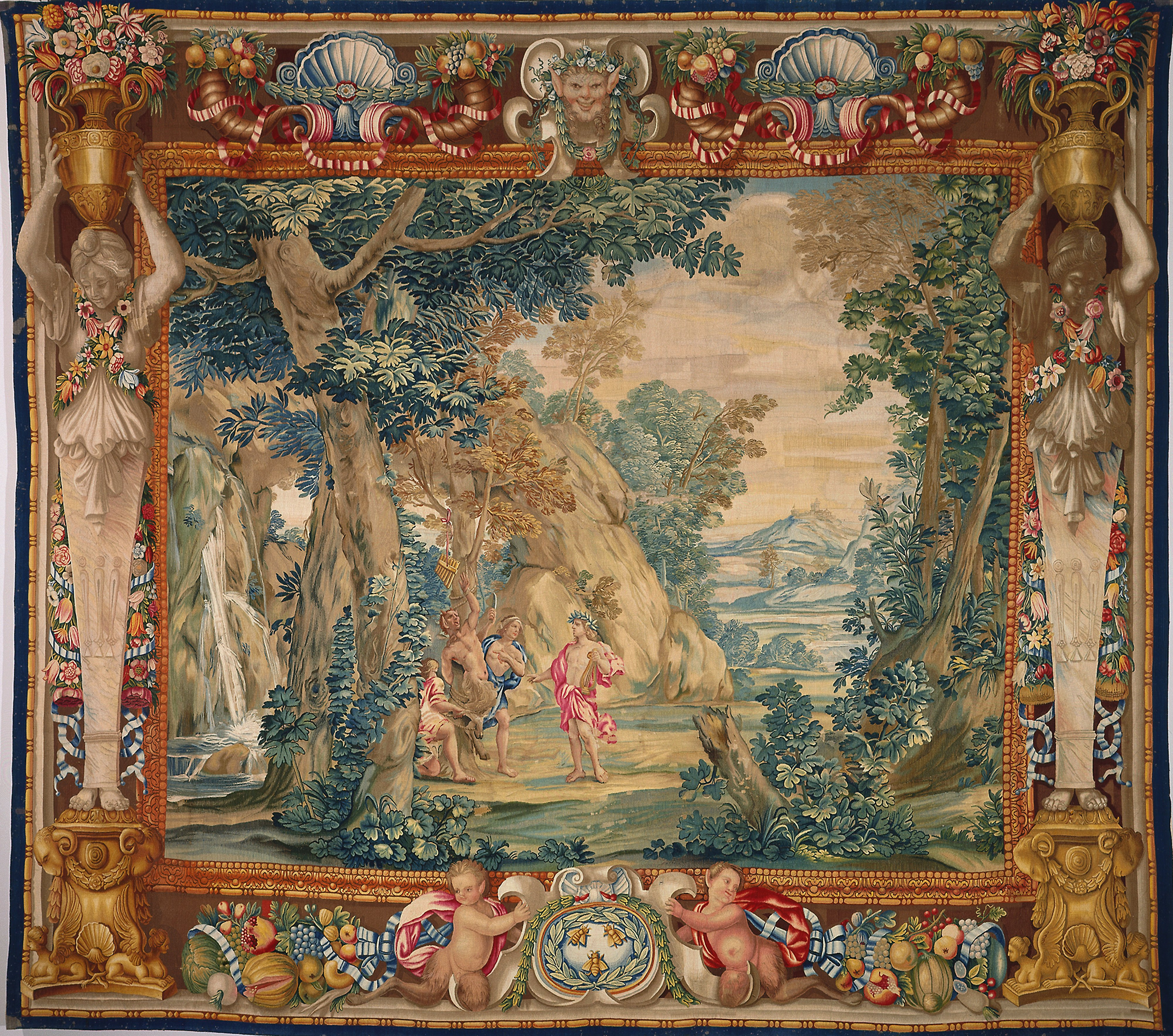
Baroque caryatids in the Apollo and Attendants Flaying Marsyas tapestry, 17th century, wool and silk, Minneapolis Institute of Art, Minneapolis, US

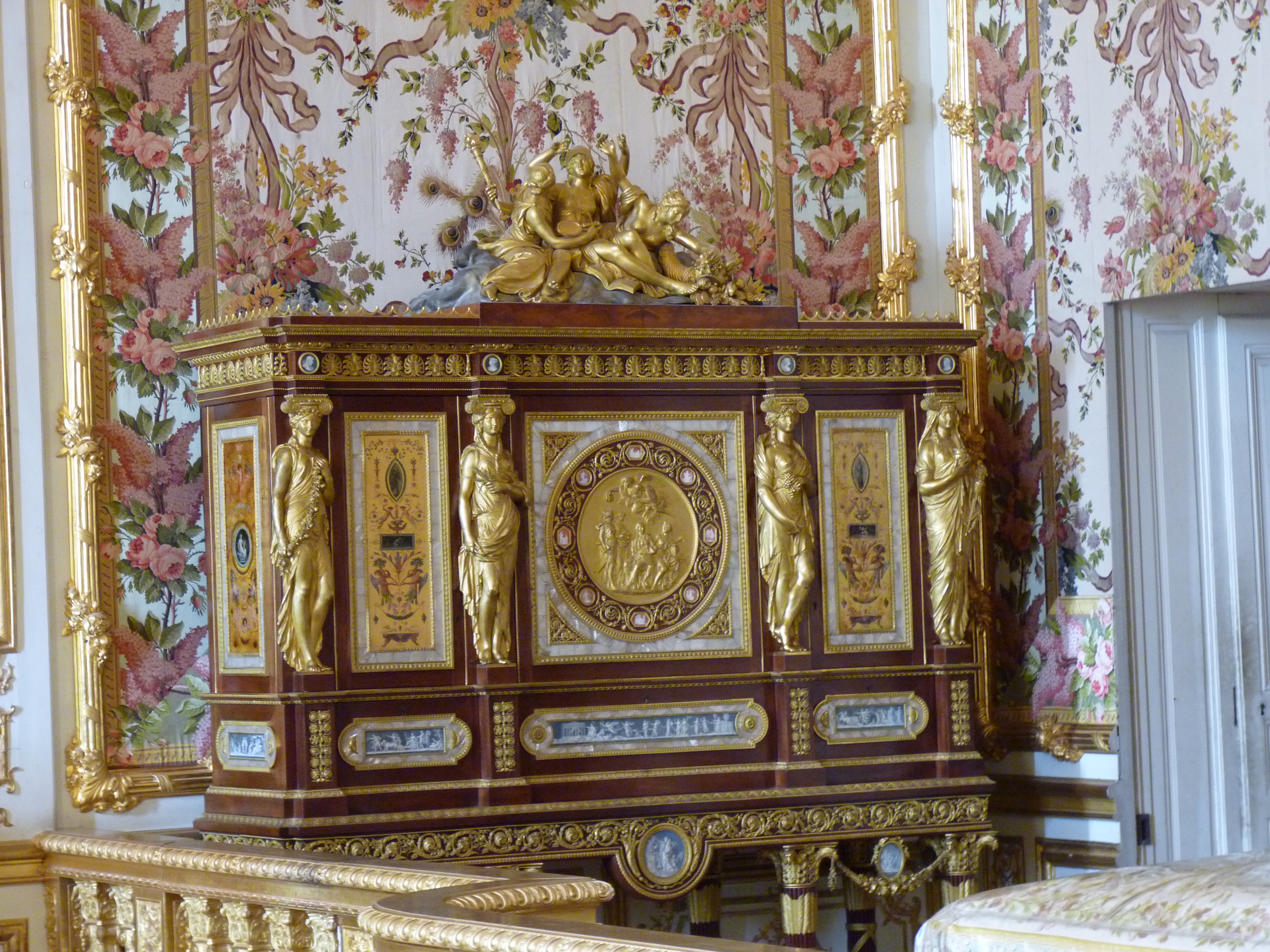
Louis XVI style jewelry locket of Marie-Antoinette, by Ferdinand Schwerdfeger, 1787, mahogany, mother-of-pearl inlays, paintings under glass, porcelain plate, and gilded bronzes, Chambre de la Reine, Palace of Versailles, Versailles, France

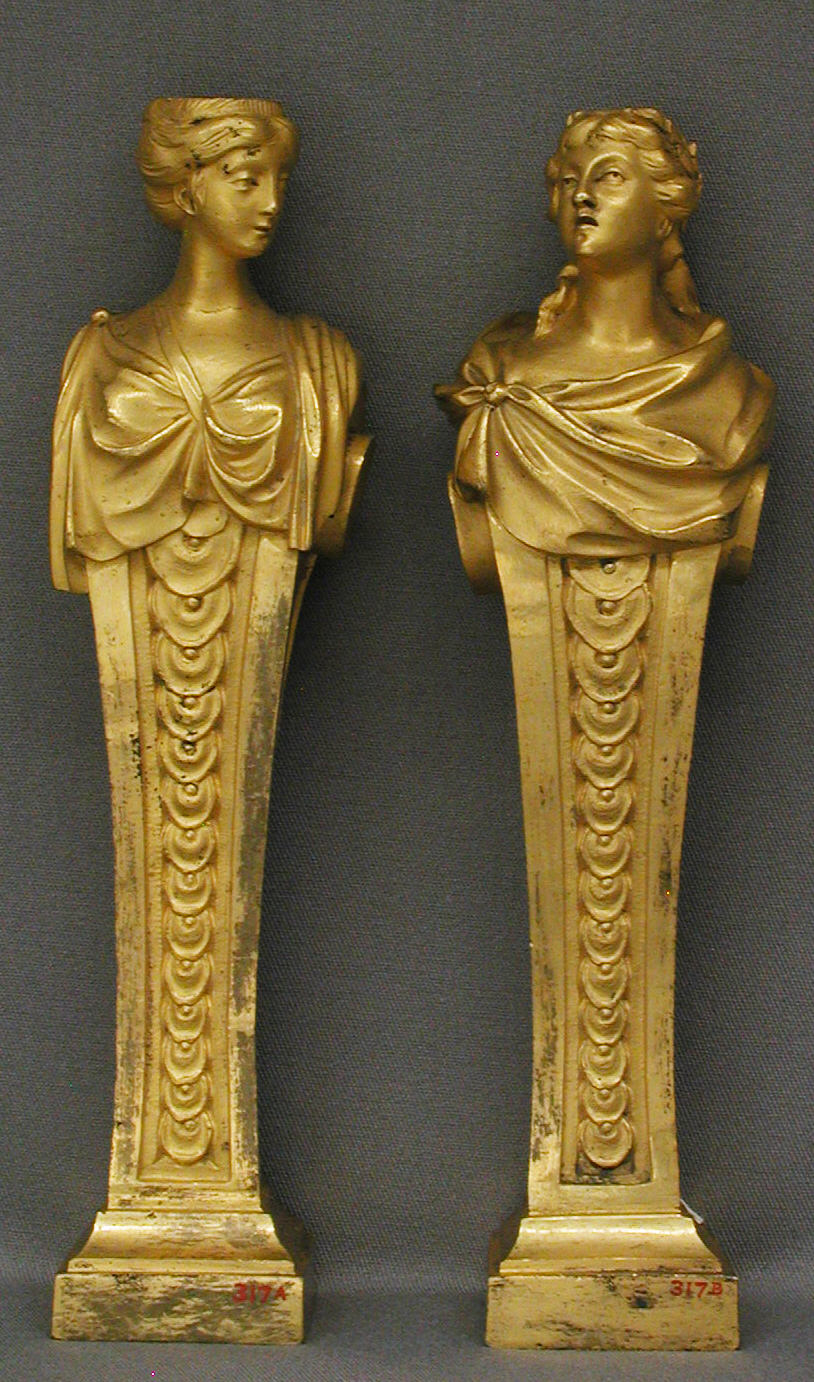
Pair of Louis XVI style caryatid, 18th century, gilt bronze, Metropolitan Museum of Art, New York City

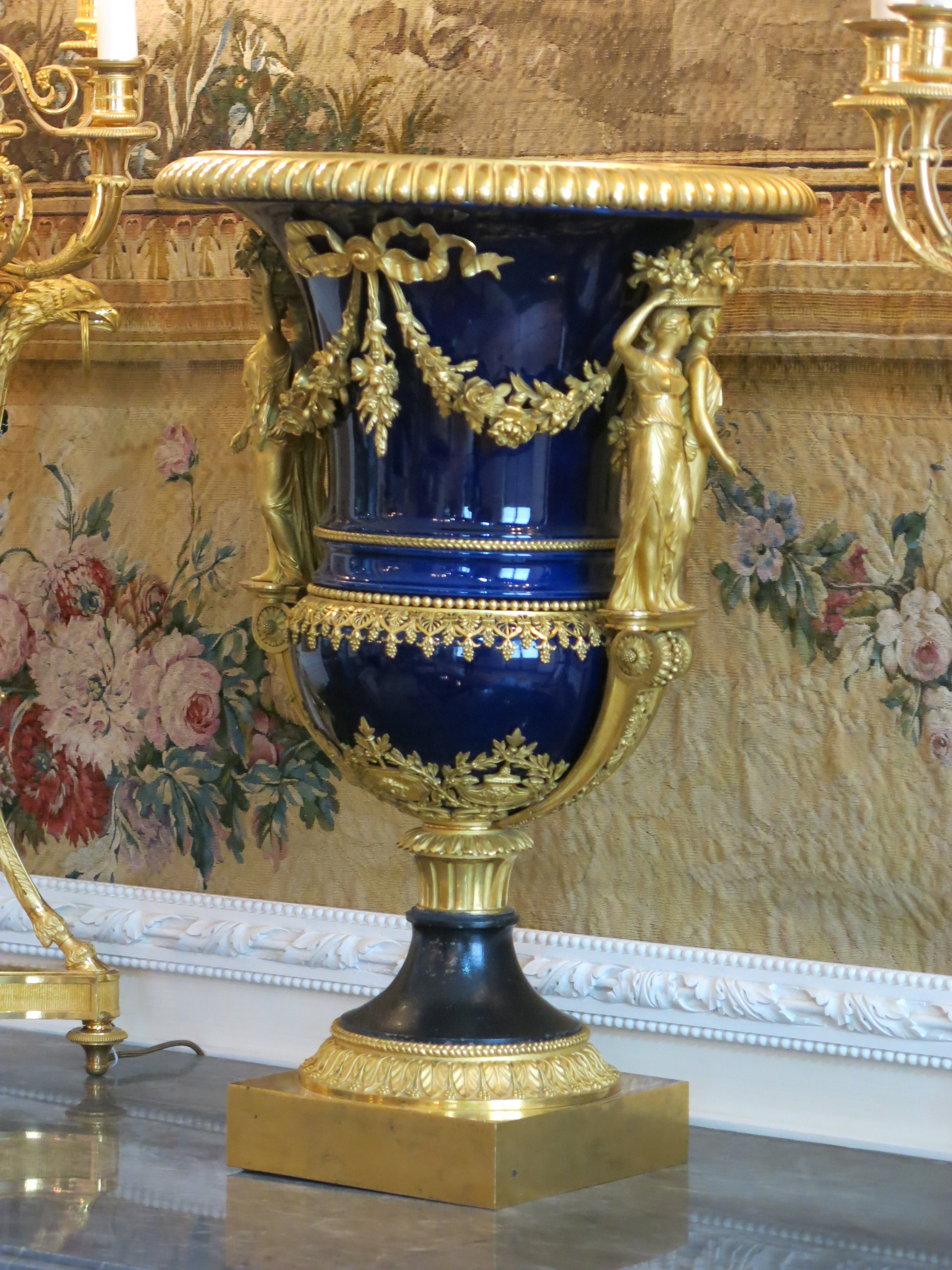
Louis XVI style caryatids on the Médicis Vase, by Louis-Simon Boizot, Pierre Philippe-Thomire and the Sèvres Porcelain Manufactory, c.1787, porcelain and gilded bronze, Louvre

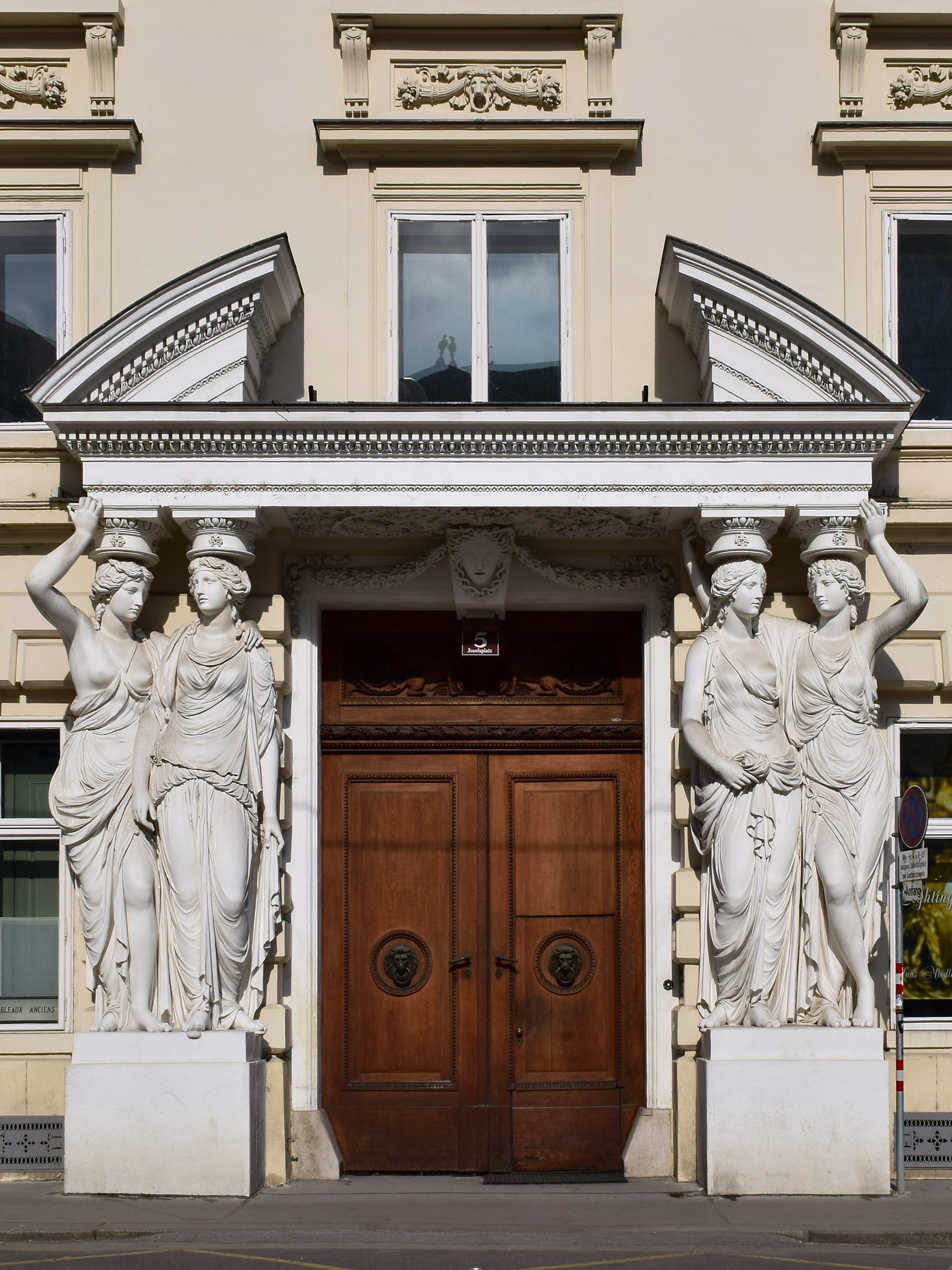
Neoclassical caryatids of the portal of the Palais Pallavicini in Josefsplatz, Vienna, Austria, by Johann Ferdinand Hetzendorf von Hohenberg, 1784

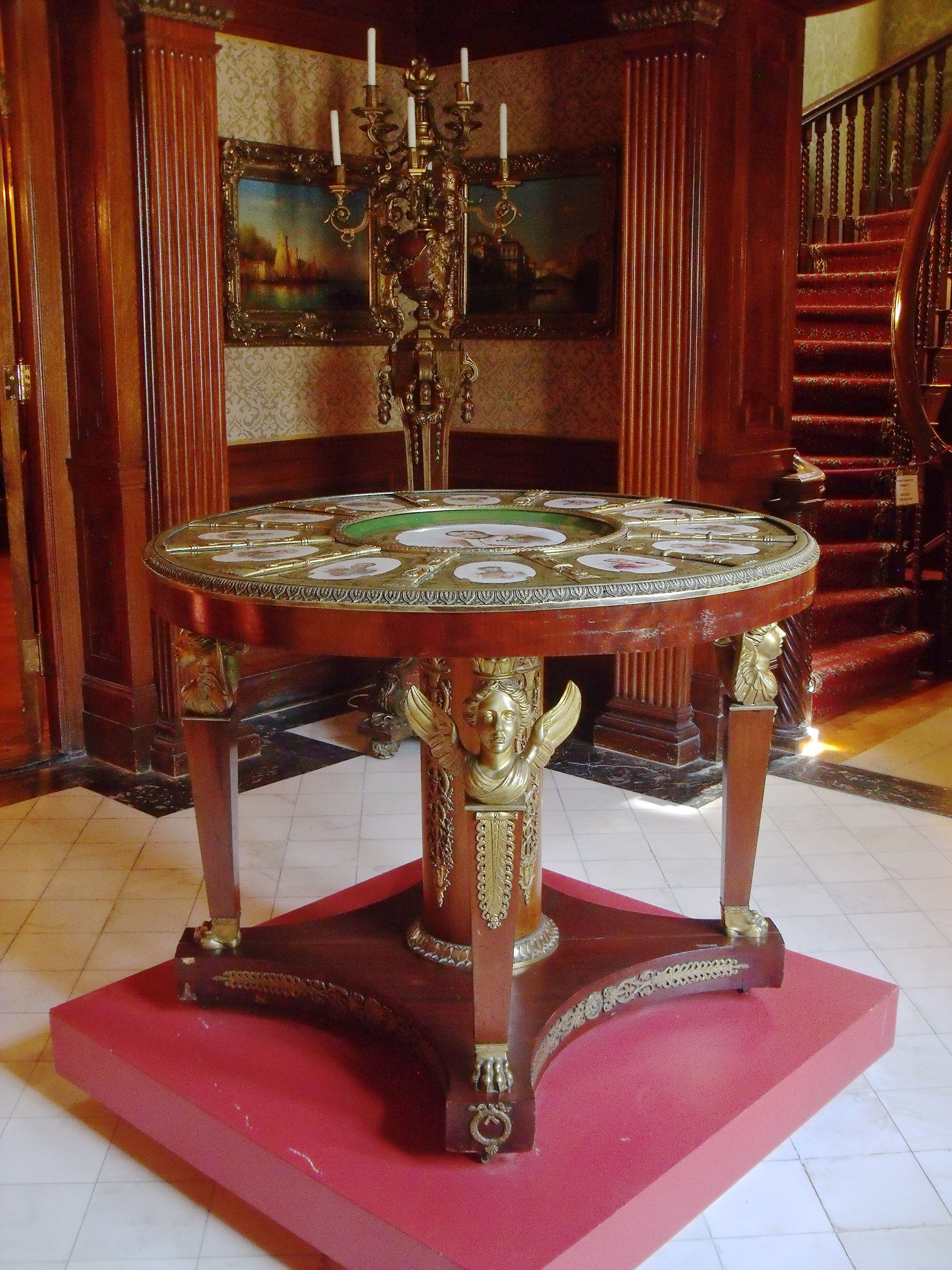
Empire style table with caryatids en gaine supported by bare feet, early 19th century, wood, metal, glass, pigment, and porcelain, Musée Dufresne-Nincheri, Montreal, Canada

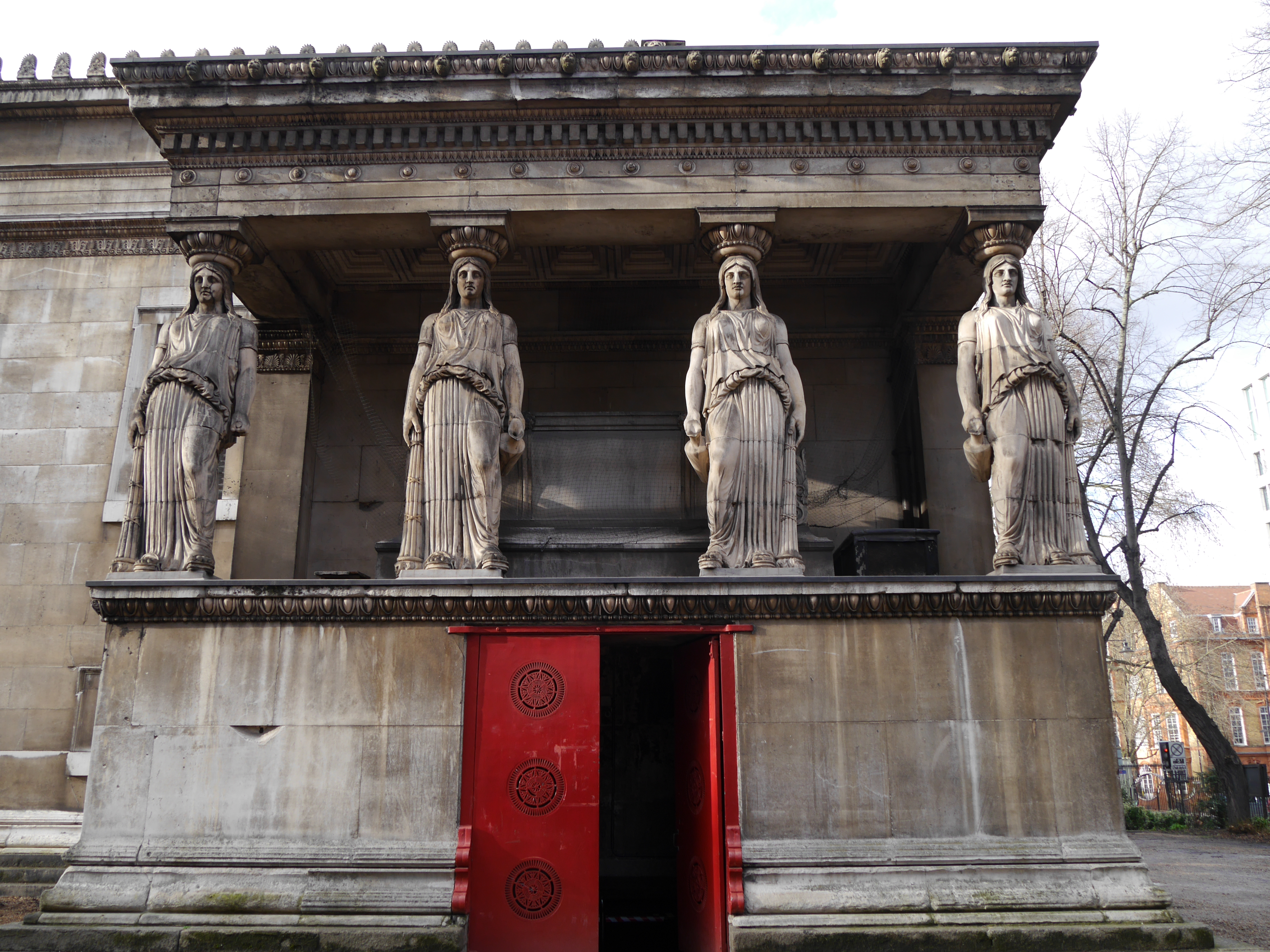
Neoclassical porch with caryatids of the St Pancras New Church, London, almost identical with the Ancient Greek one of the Erechtheum, by William and Henry William Inwood, 1819-1822

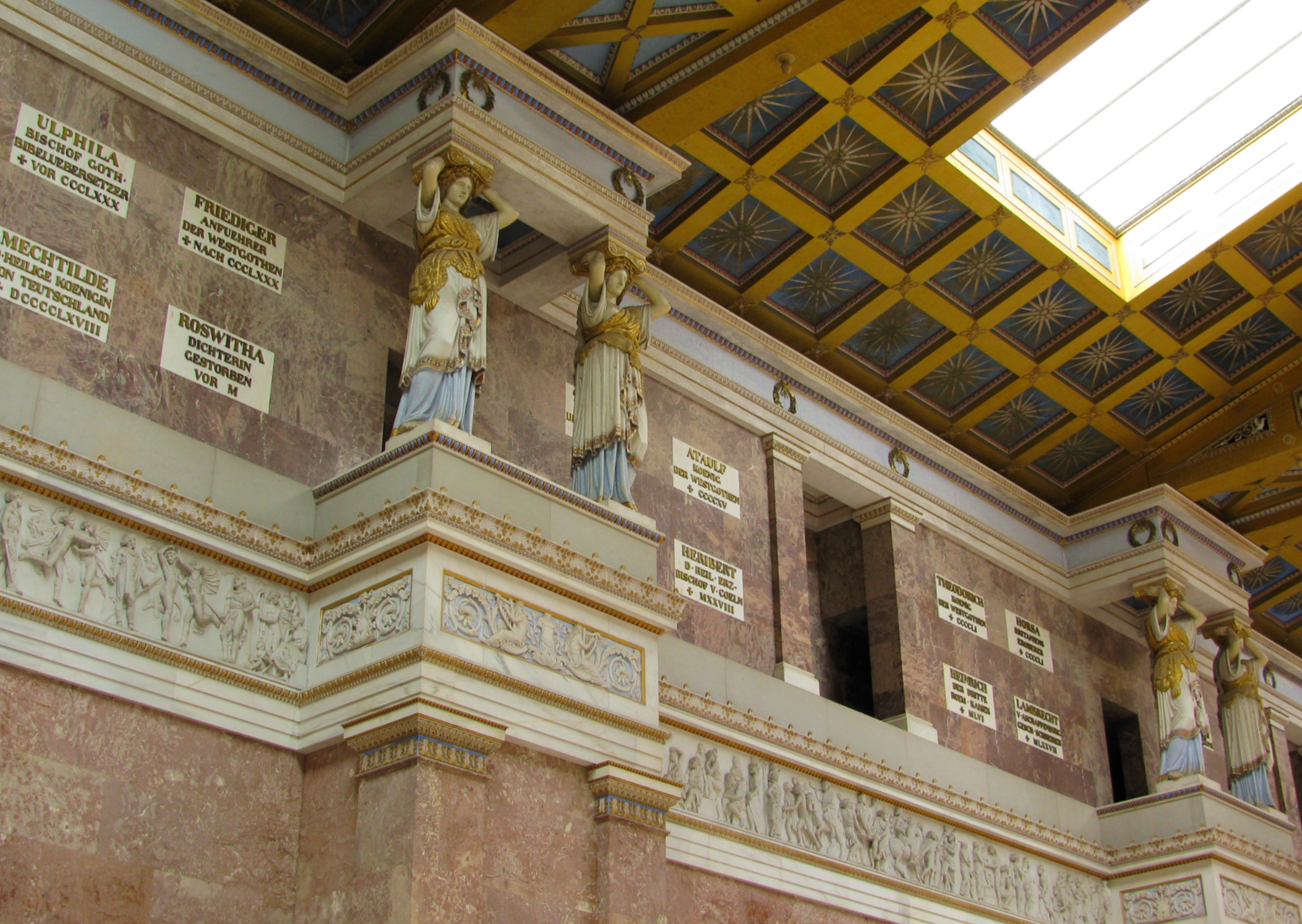
Polychrome Greek Revival caryatids of the Walhalla Temple, near Regensburg, Germany, designed by Leo von Klenze in 1821, built in 1830-1842

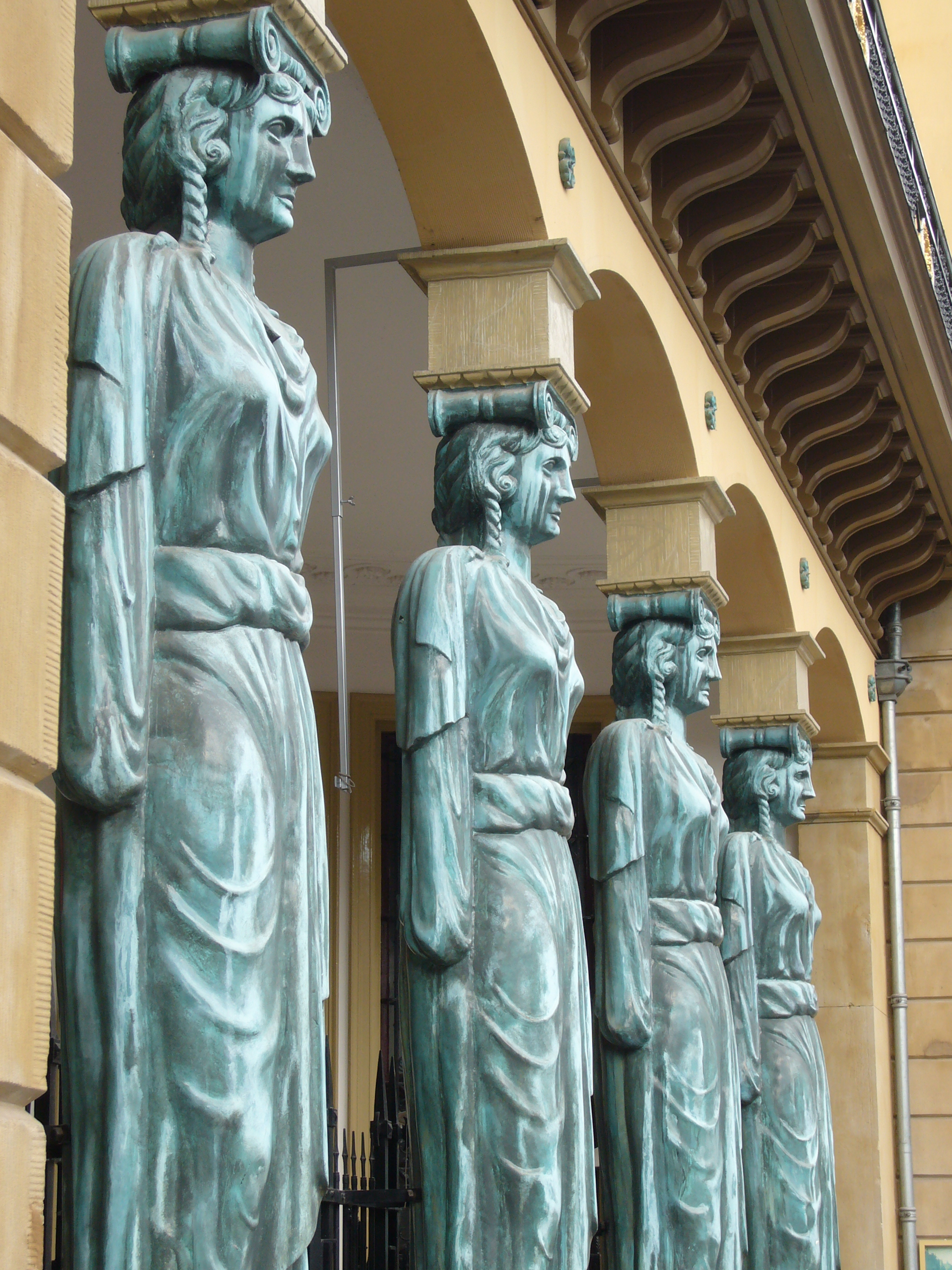
Neoclassical caryatids of the Winkel van Sinkel department store, Utrecht, the Netherlands, 1837-1839, by P. Adams

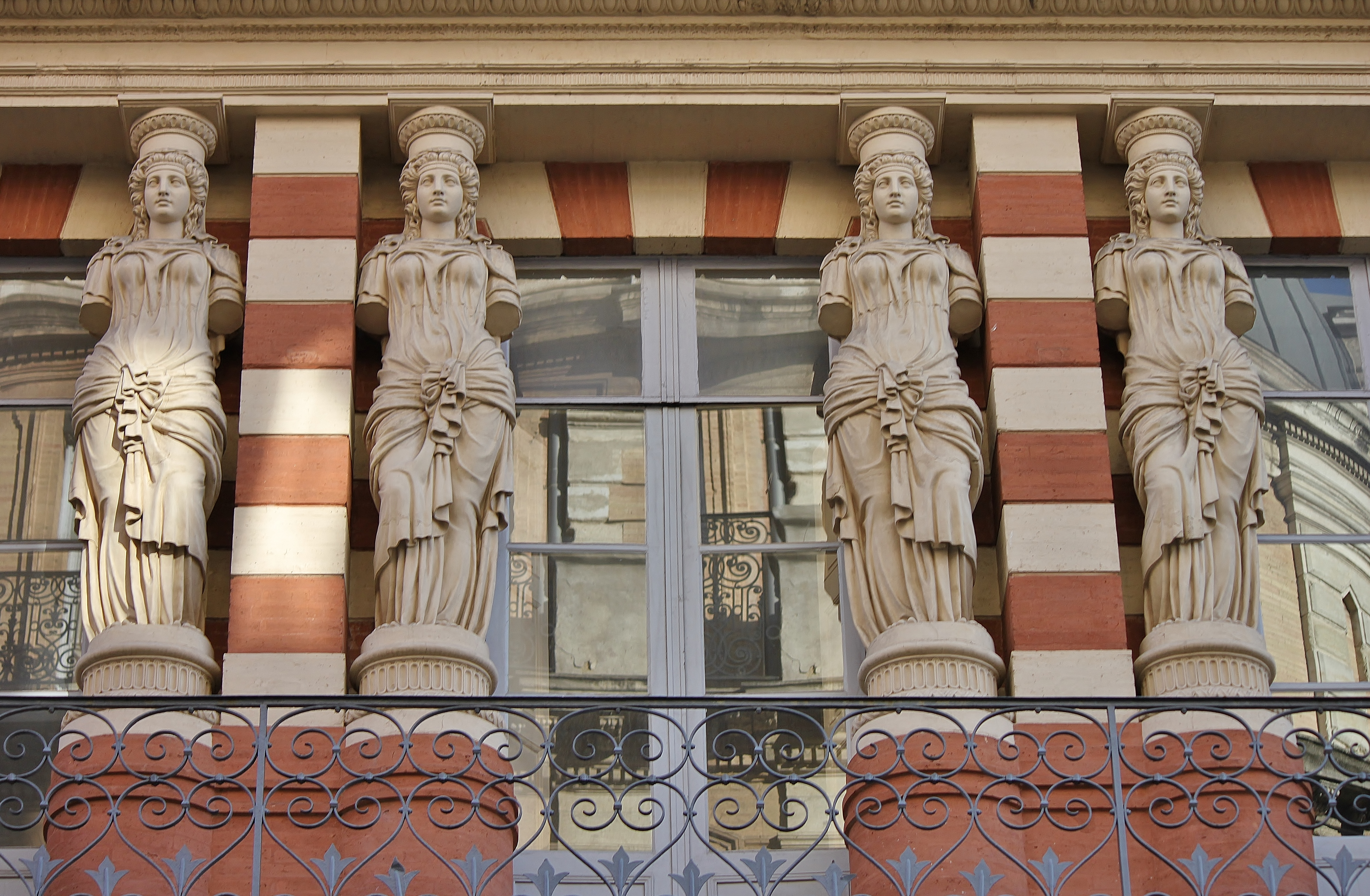
Neoclassical white terracotta caryatids of the Virebent Factory, Toulouse, France, by Auguste Virebent, 1840

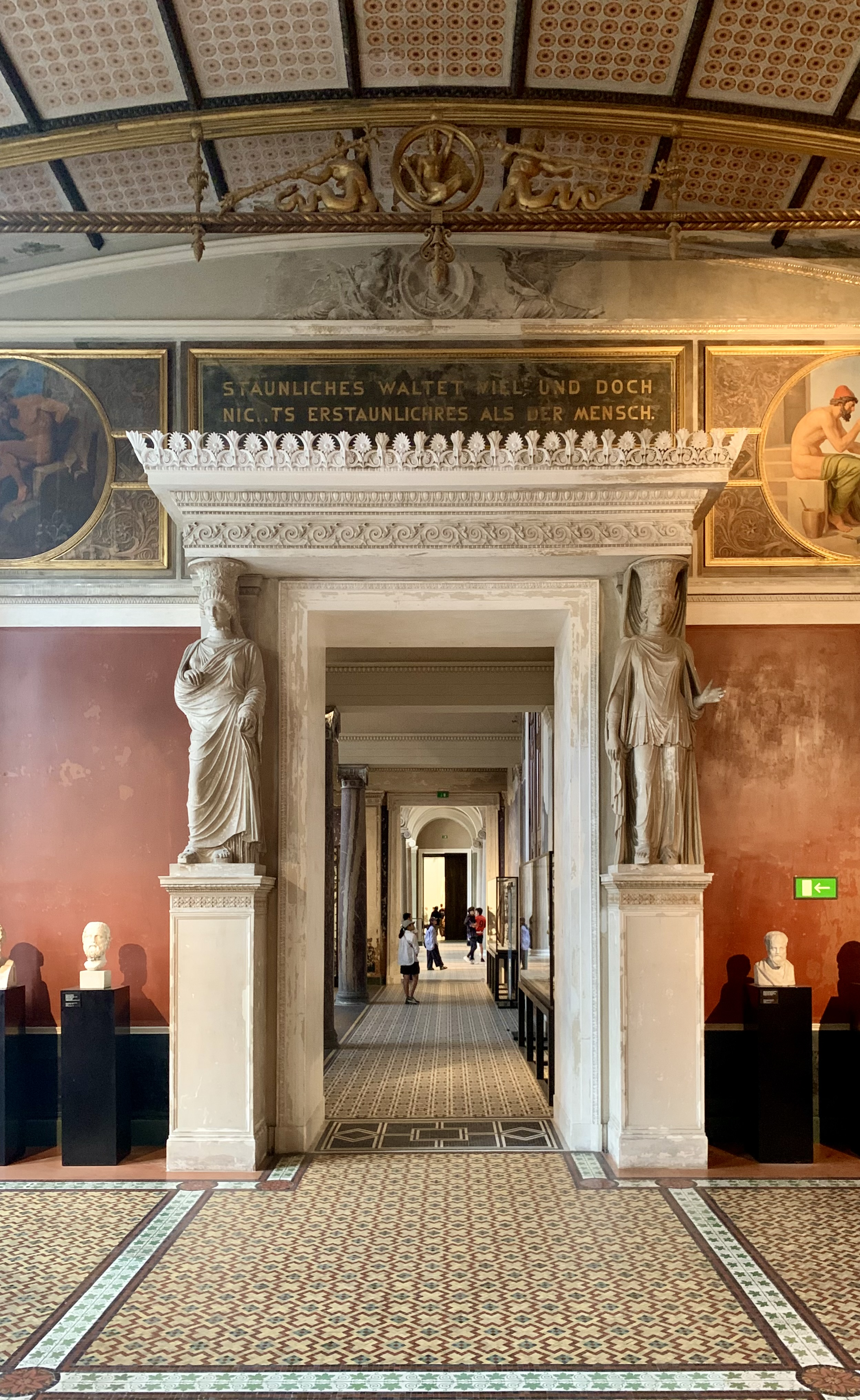
Neoclassical caryatids of the south wall of the Room of the Niobids, Neues Museum, Berlin, by Friedrich August Stüler, 1845-1850

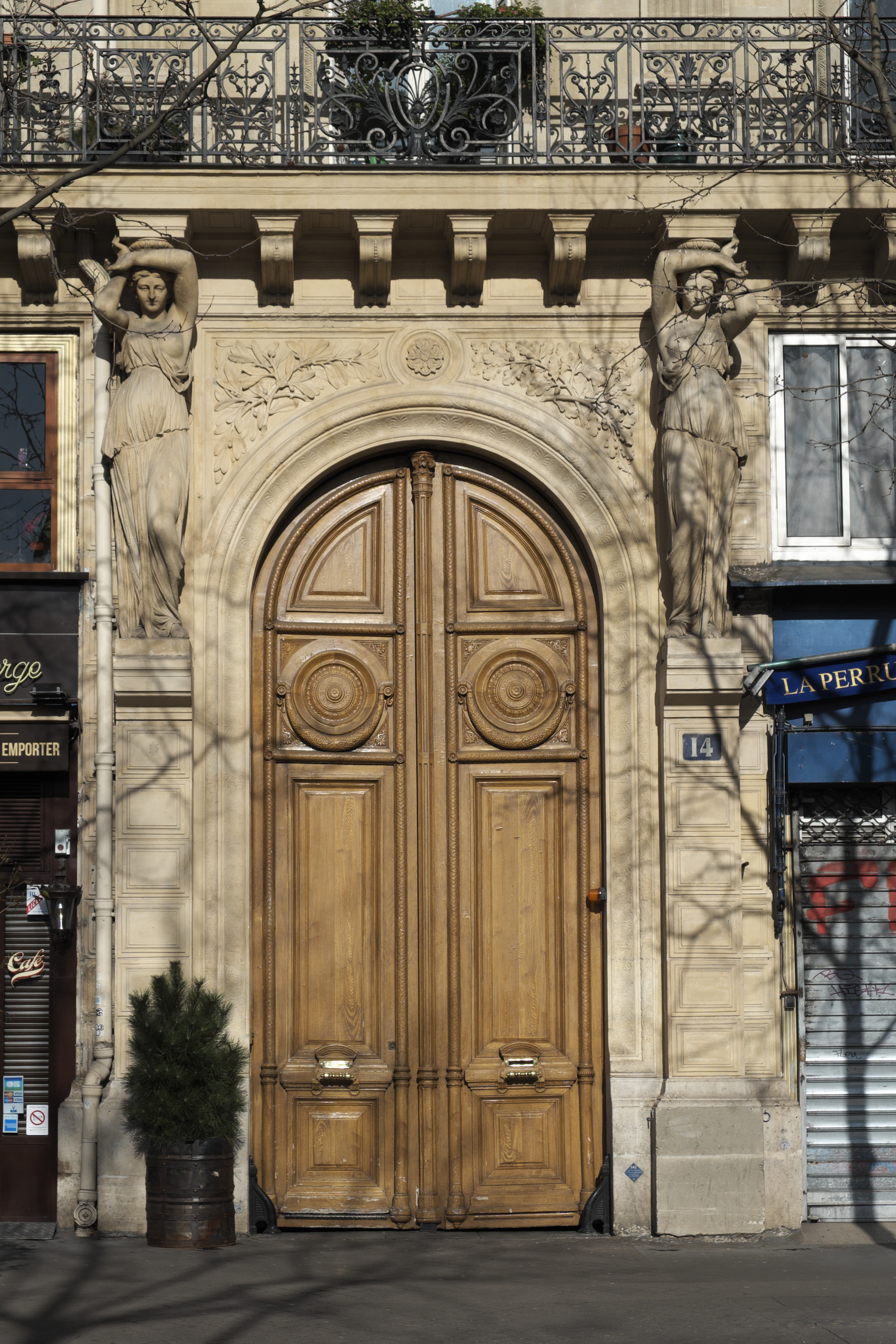
Neoclassical caryatids of Quai de la Mégisserie no. 14, Paris, sculptor Auguste Millet and architect Henri Blondel, 1864

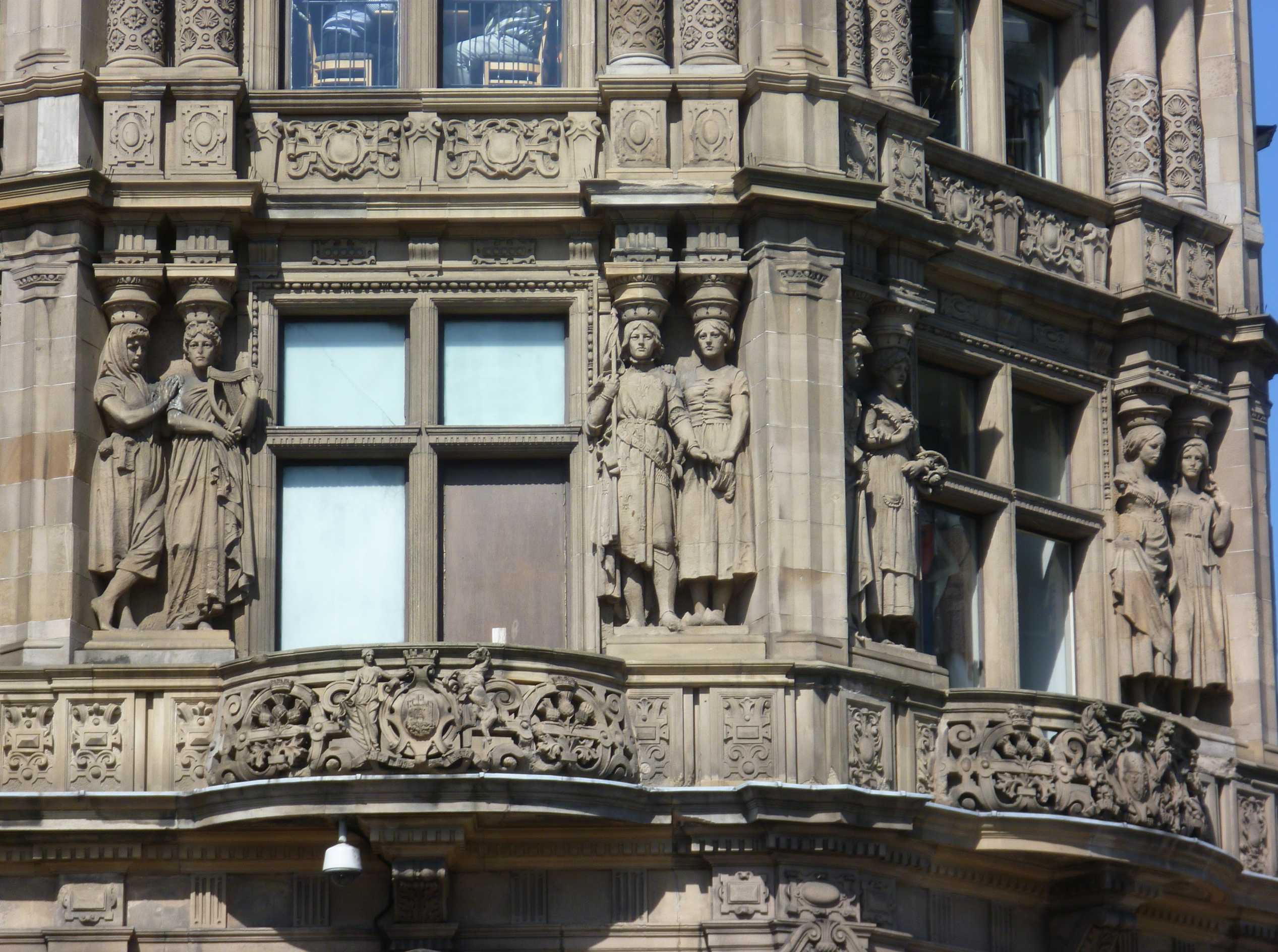
Renaissance Revival caryatids on the Jenners, department store, Edinburgh, UK, by William Hamilton Beattie, 1894

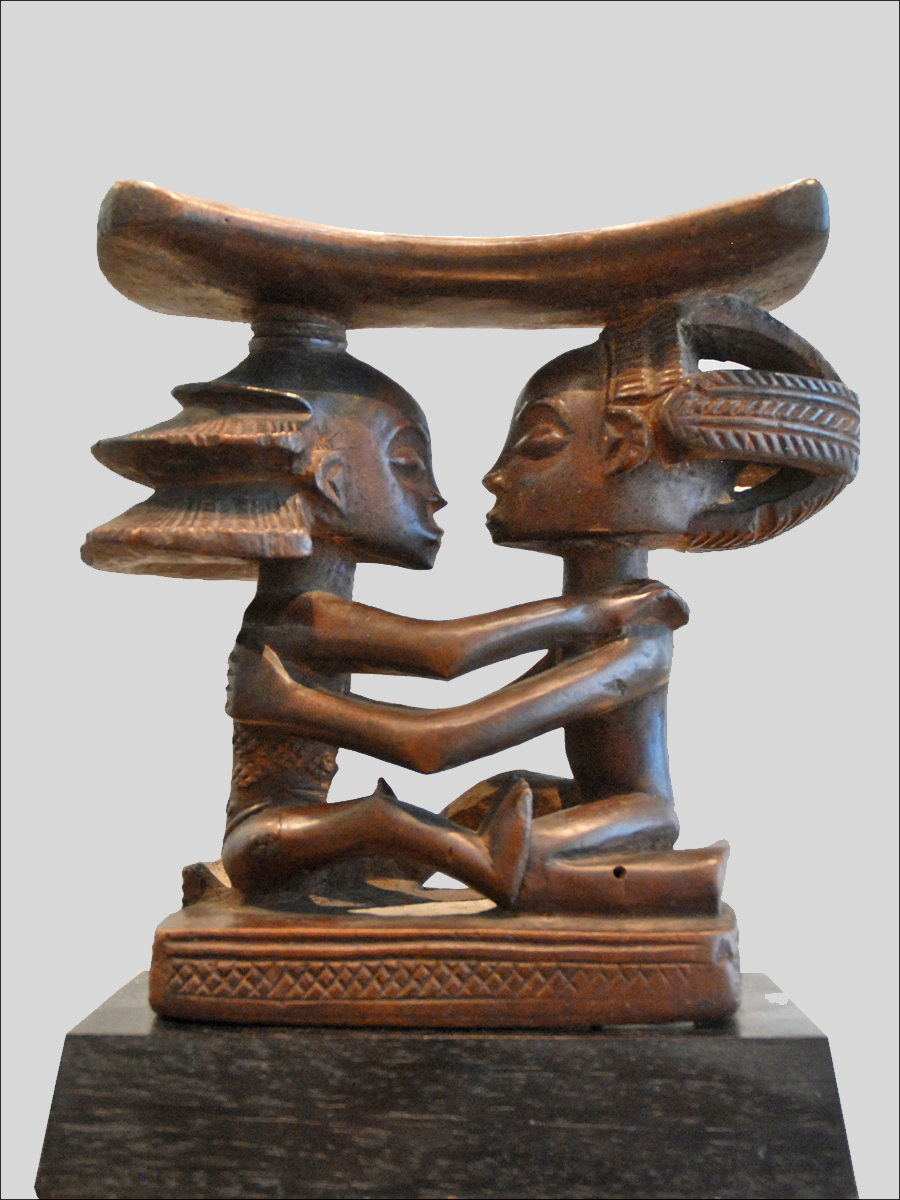
Luba headrest with two caryatid, 19th century, wood, Musée du Quai Branly, Paris

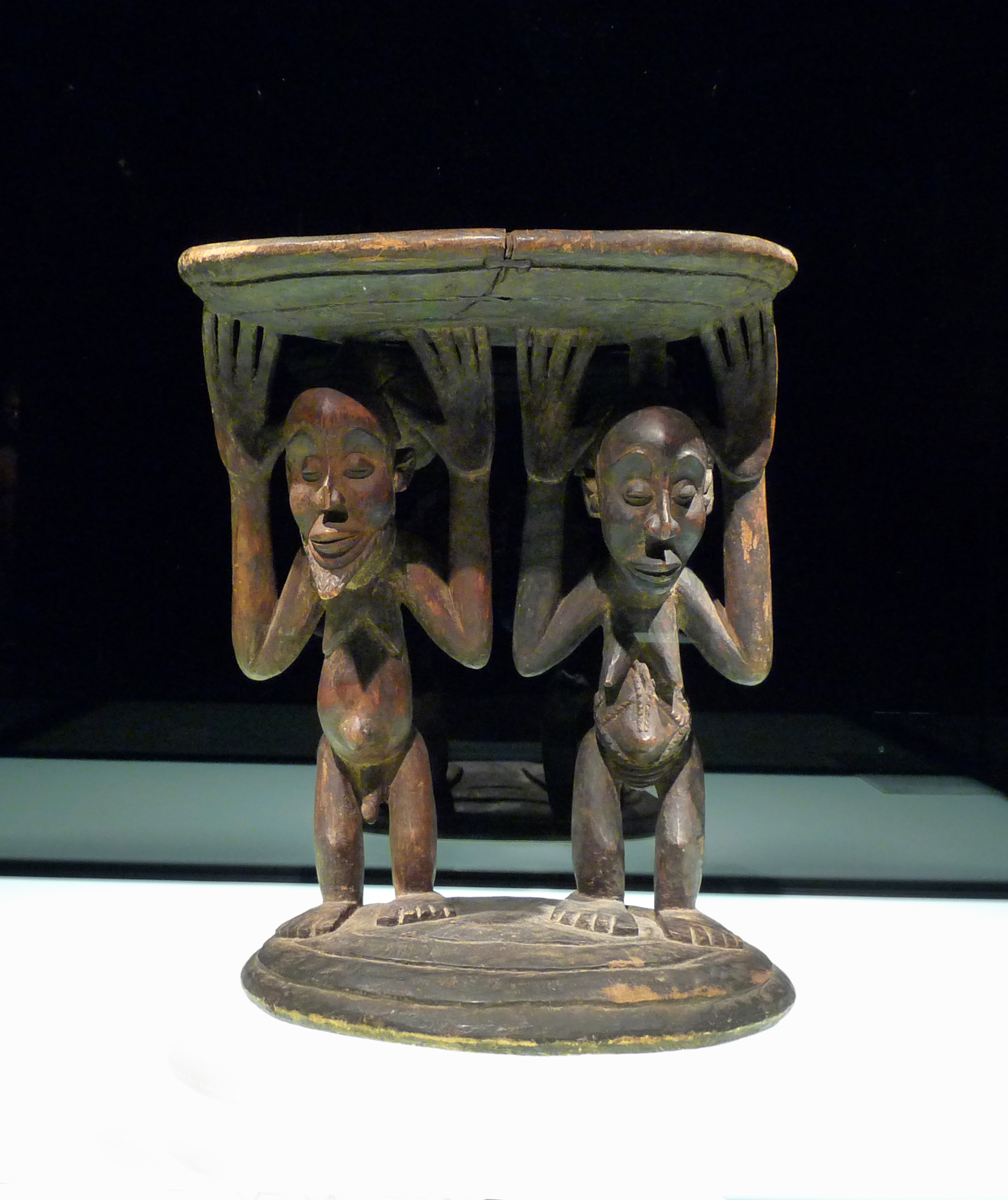
Luba stool with two caryatids, 19th century, wood, Ethnological Museum of Berlin

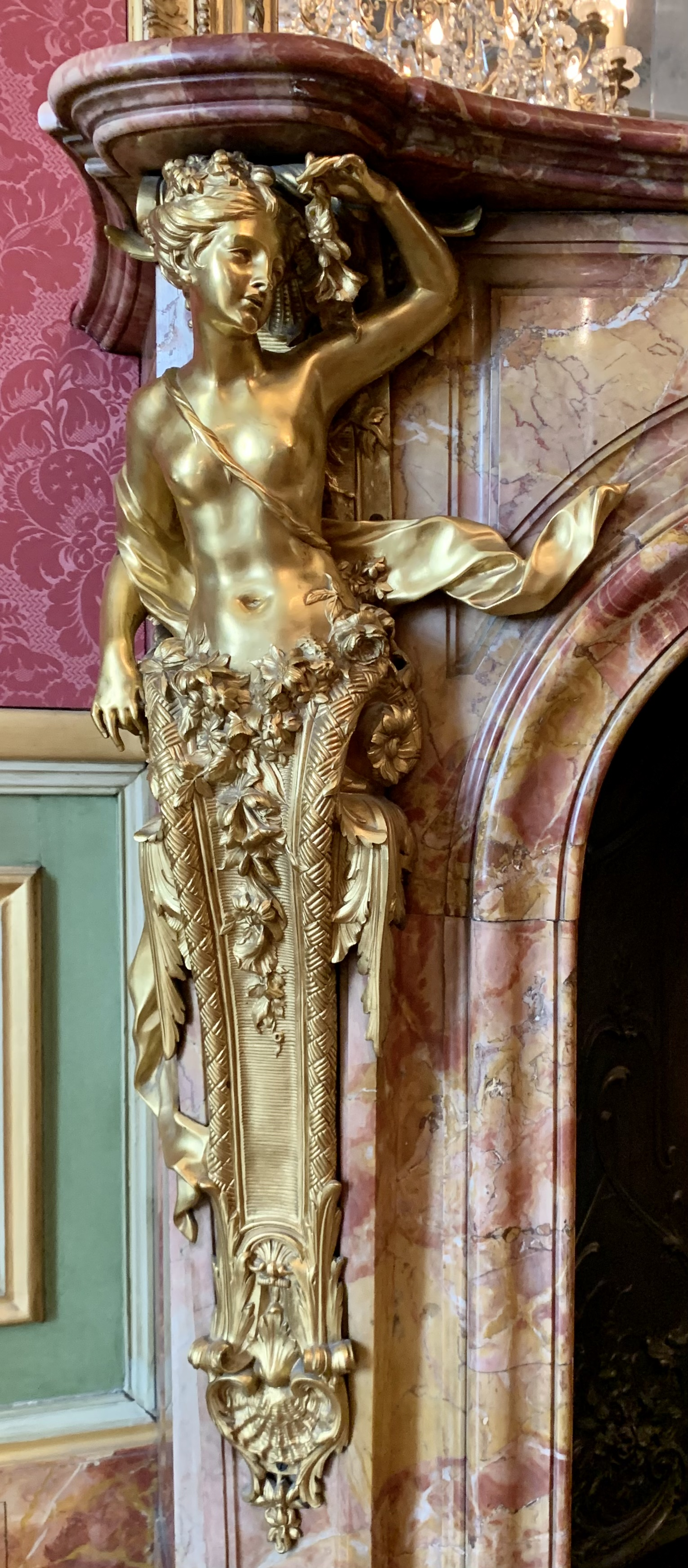
Rococo Revival gilt bronze caryatid on the fireplace in the room 538 of the Louvre Palace, Paris, unknown architect or sculptor, 19th century

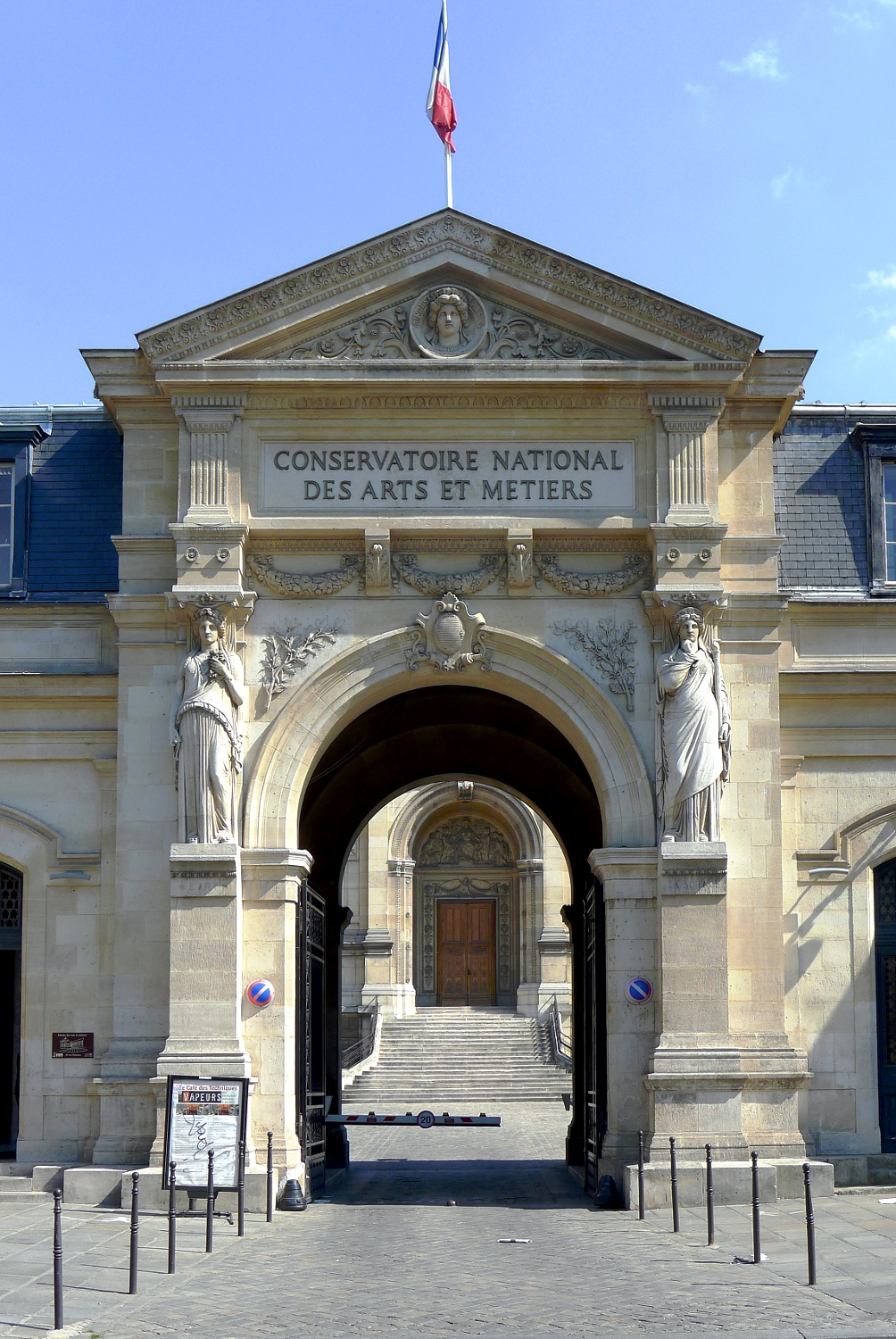
Pair of Neoclassical caryatids at the entrance of the Conservatoire national des arts et métiers (Rue Saint-Martin no. 292), Paris, unknown architect, mid-19th century

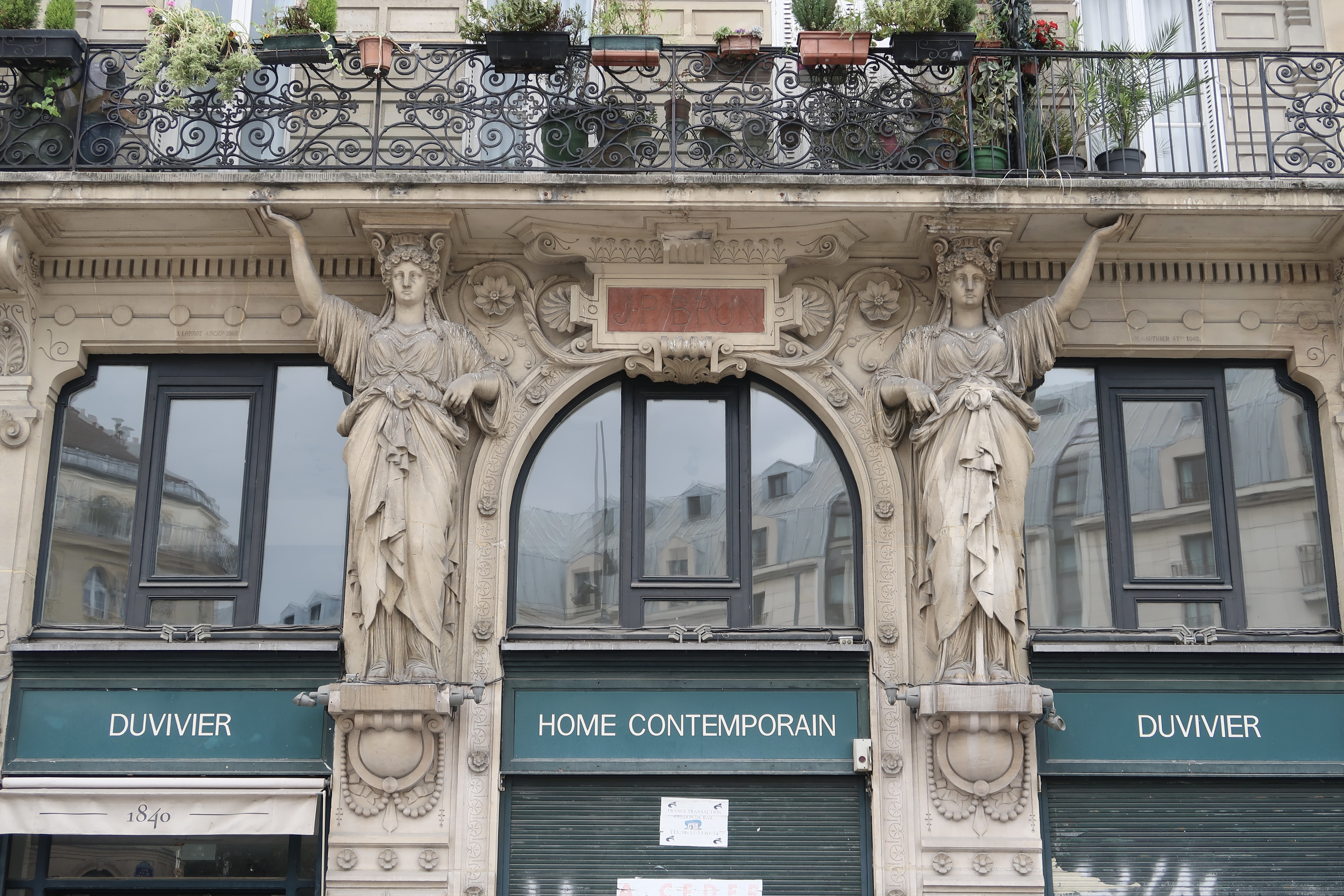
Neoclassical caryatids of Rue des Halles no. 19, Paris, designed by Jean Lobrot and sculpted by Charles Gauthier, 1868

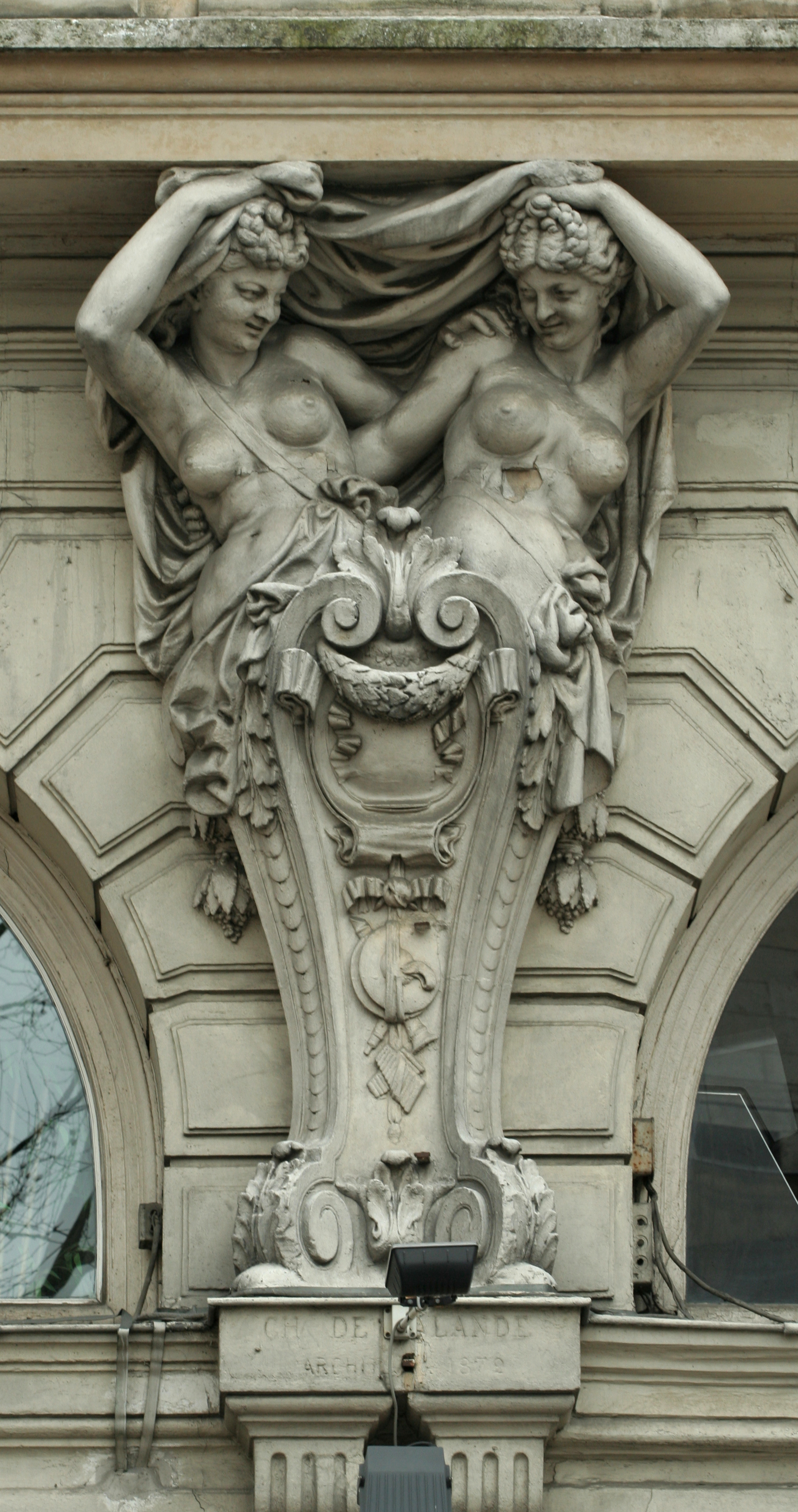
Double Beaux Arts caryatid on the façade of the Théâtre de la Renaissance, Paris, by Charles de Lalande, 1873

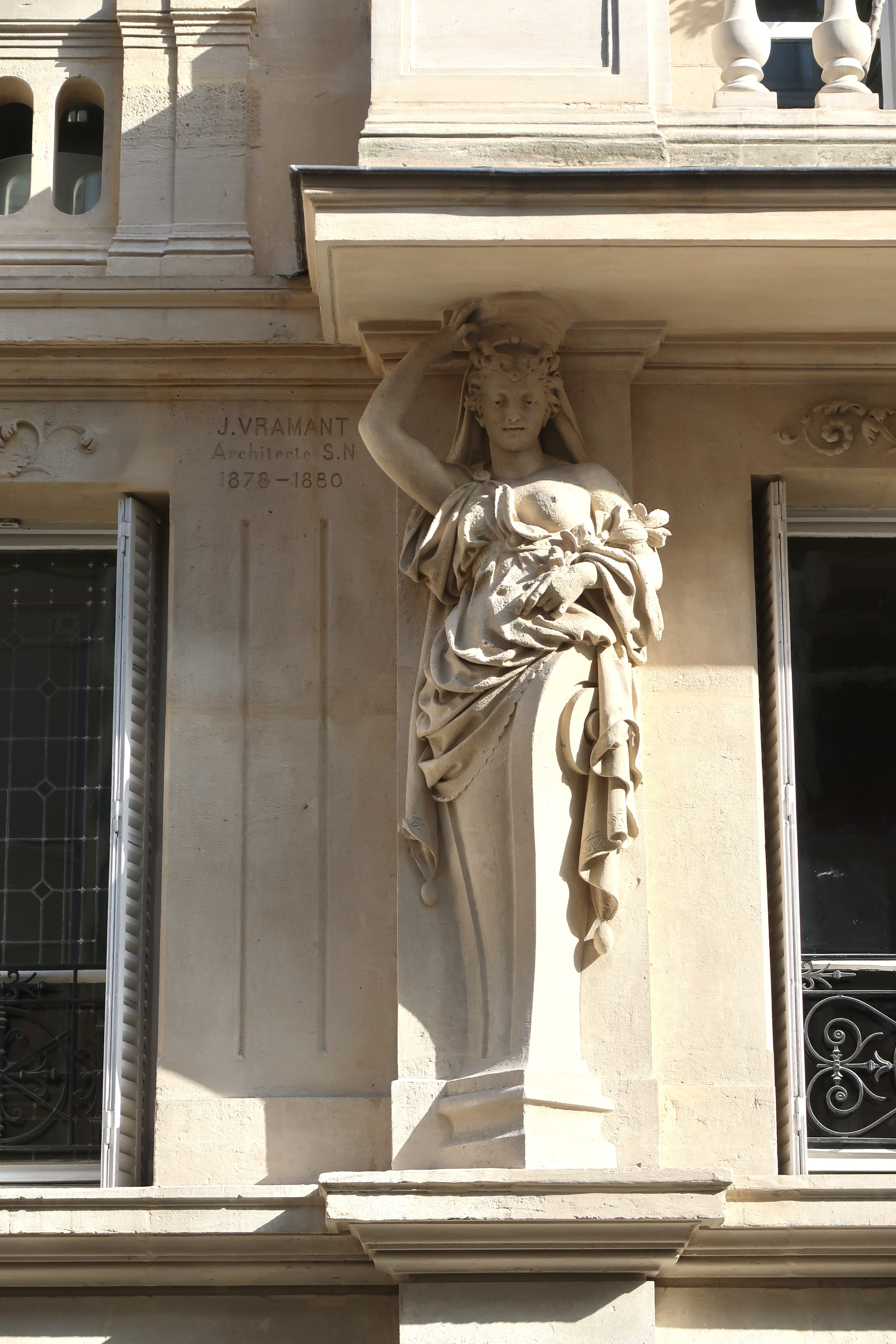
Beaux Arts caryatid (mainly Neoclassical, but also Baroque Revival through the lower part rotated at 45°) of Rue Chomel no. 11, Paris, by J. Vramant, 1878-1880

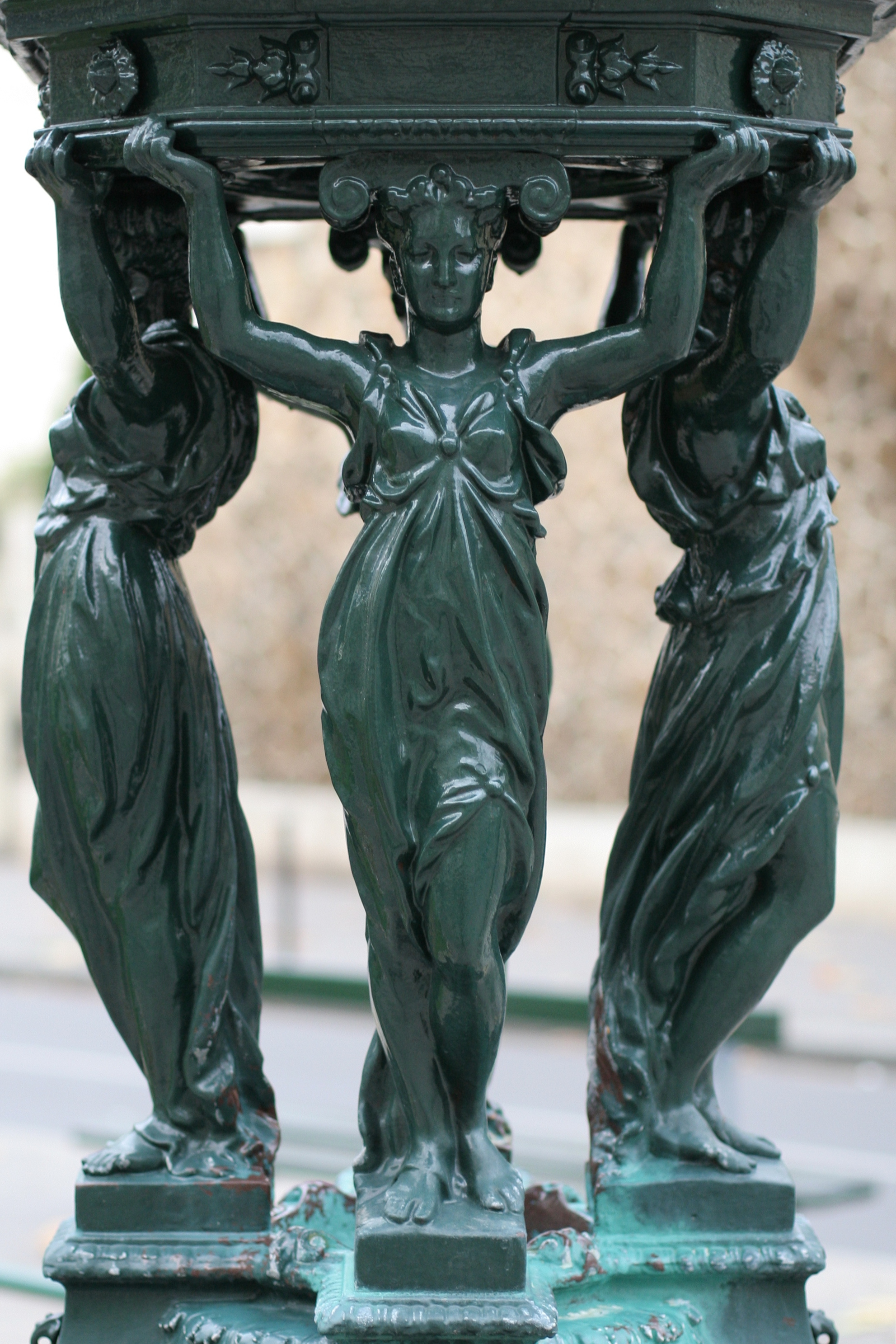
Neoclassical caryatids of a Wallace fountain in Place Moussa-et-Odette-Abadi, Paris, designed by Richard Wallace and produced by Charles-Auguste Lebourg, late 19th century

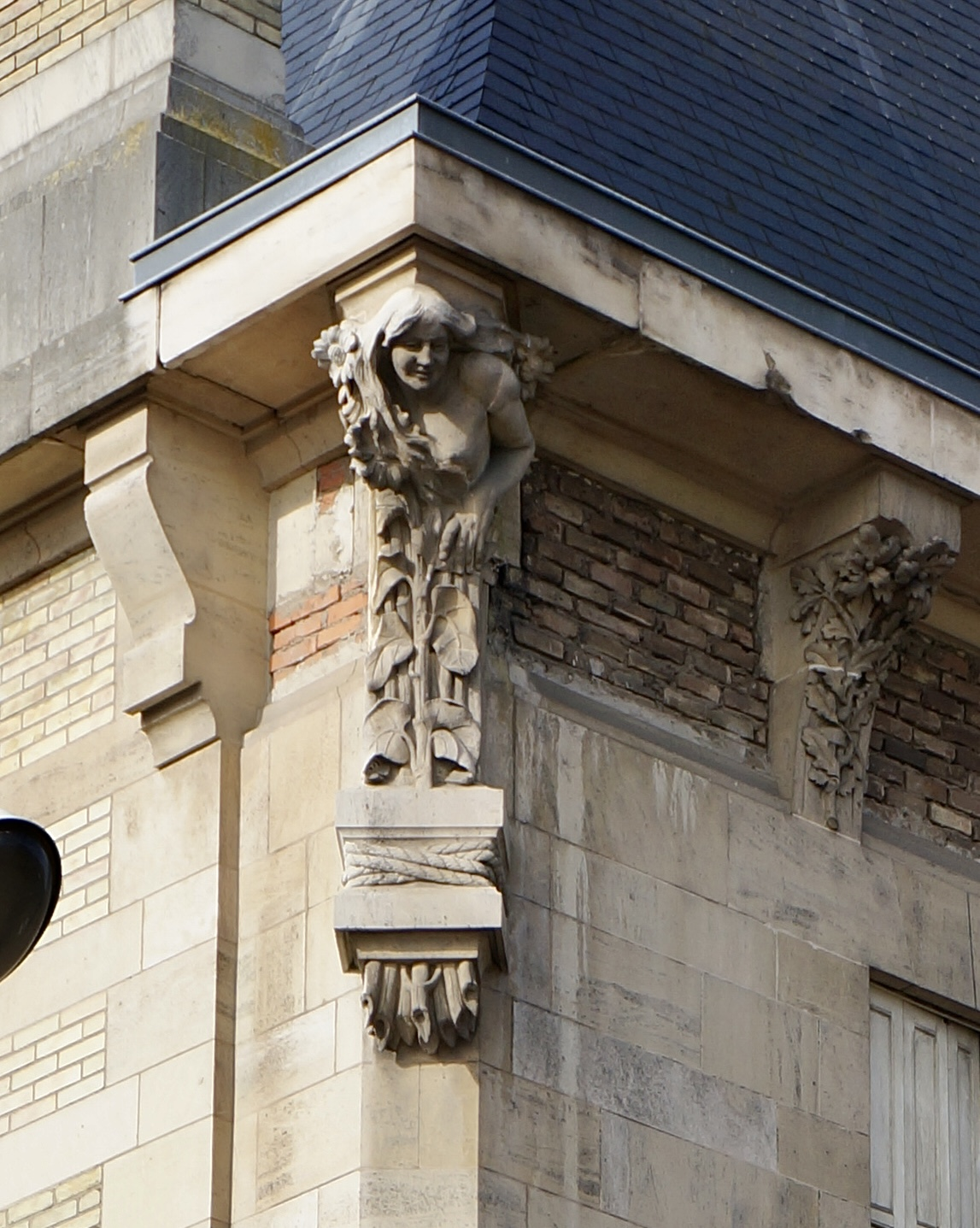
Art Nouveau caryatid-corbel on the Maison Vallin (Boulevard Lobau no. 6), Nancy, France, 1894, by Eugène Vallin

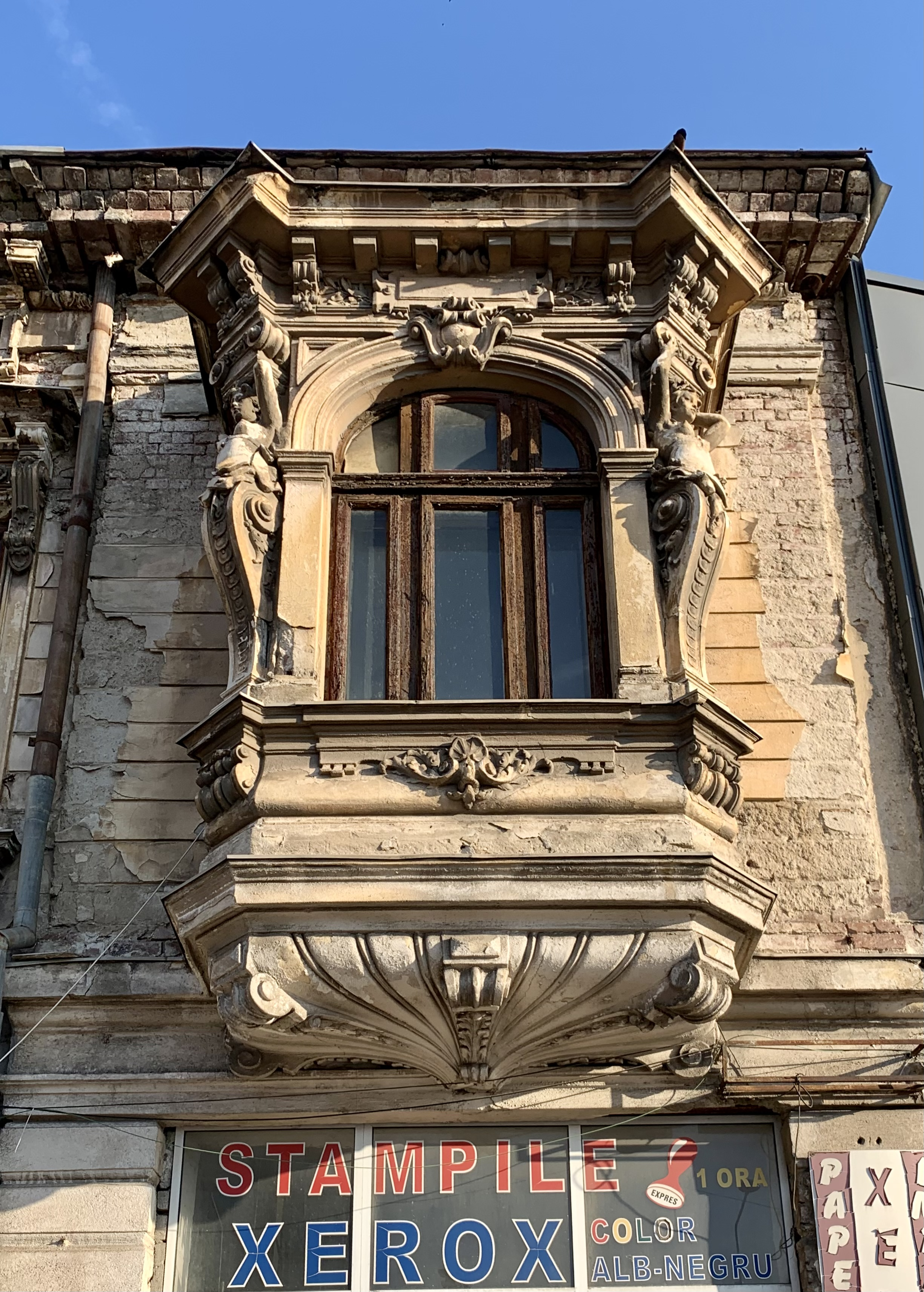
Beaux Arts caryatids of a oriel window of Strada Buzești no. 4, Bucharest, Romania, unknown architect or sculptor, c.1900

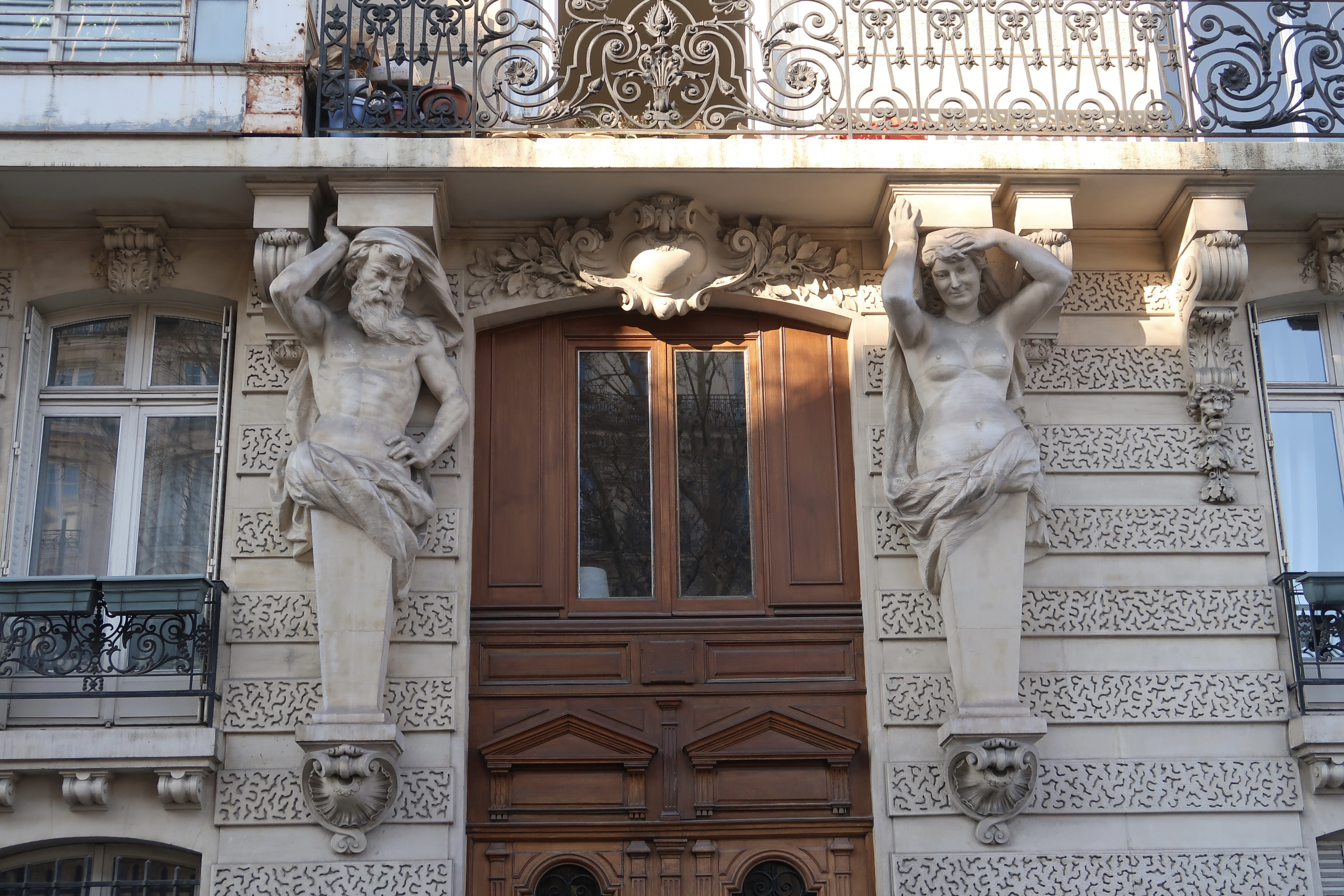
Beaux Arts atlas and caryatid of Avenue de Tourvill no. 4, Paris, unknown architect or sculptor, c.1900

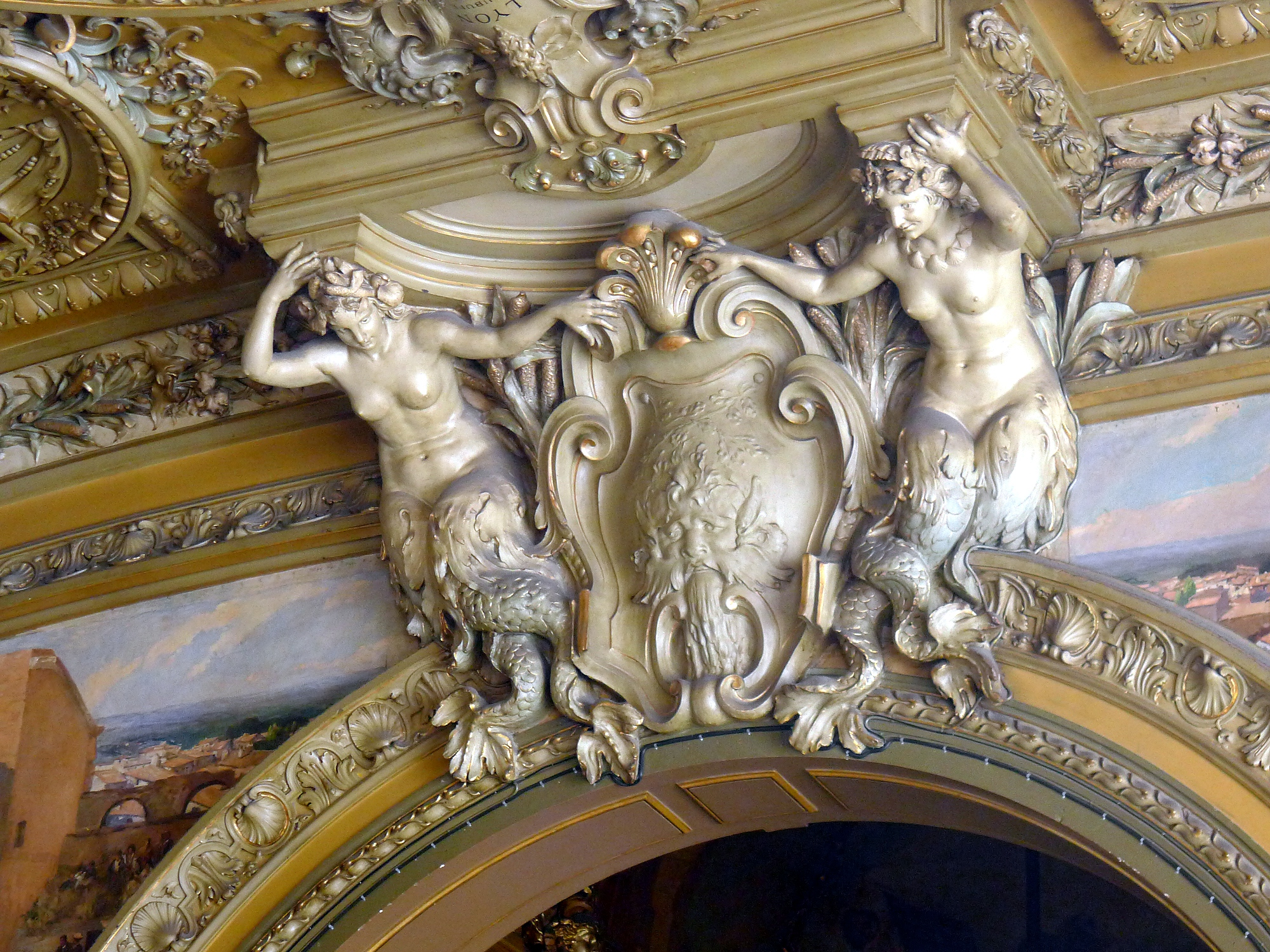
Beaux Arts mermaid caryatids with a cartouche in Le Train Bleu, Gare de Lyon, Paris, 1901, by Marius Toudoire

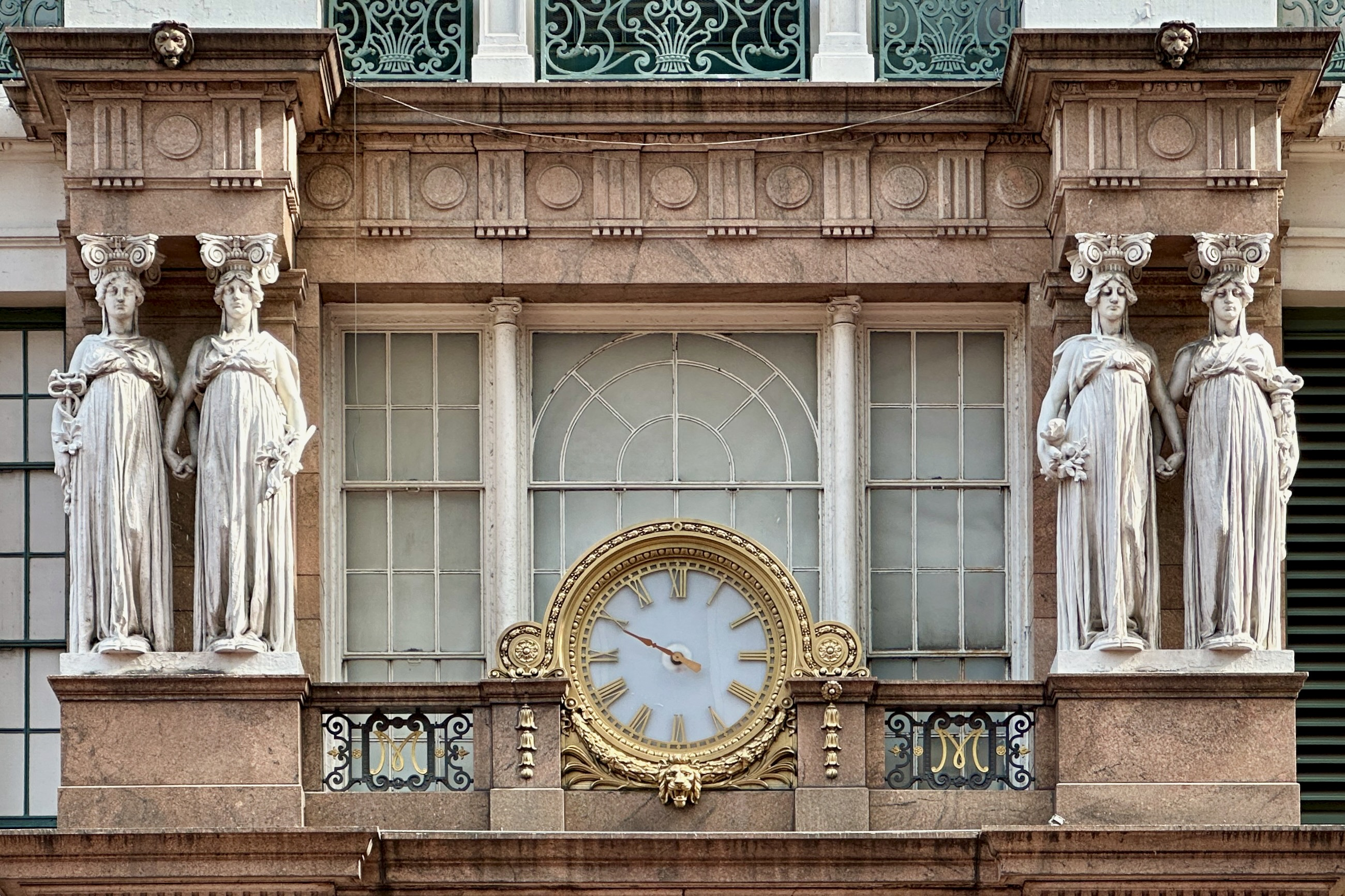
Two pairs of caryatids at the 34th Street entrance to Macy's Herald Square department store in New York City, sculpted by John Massey Rhind, 1901

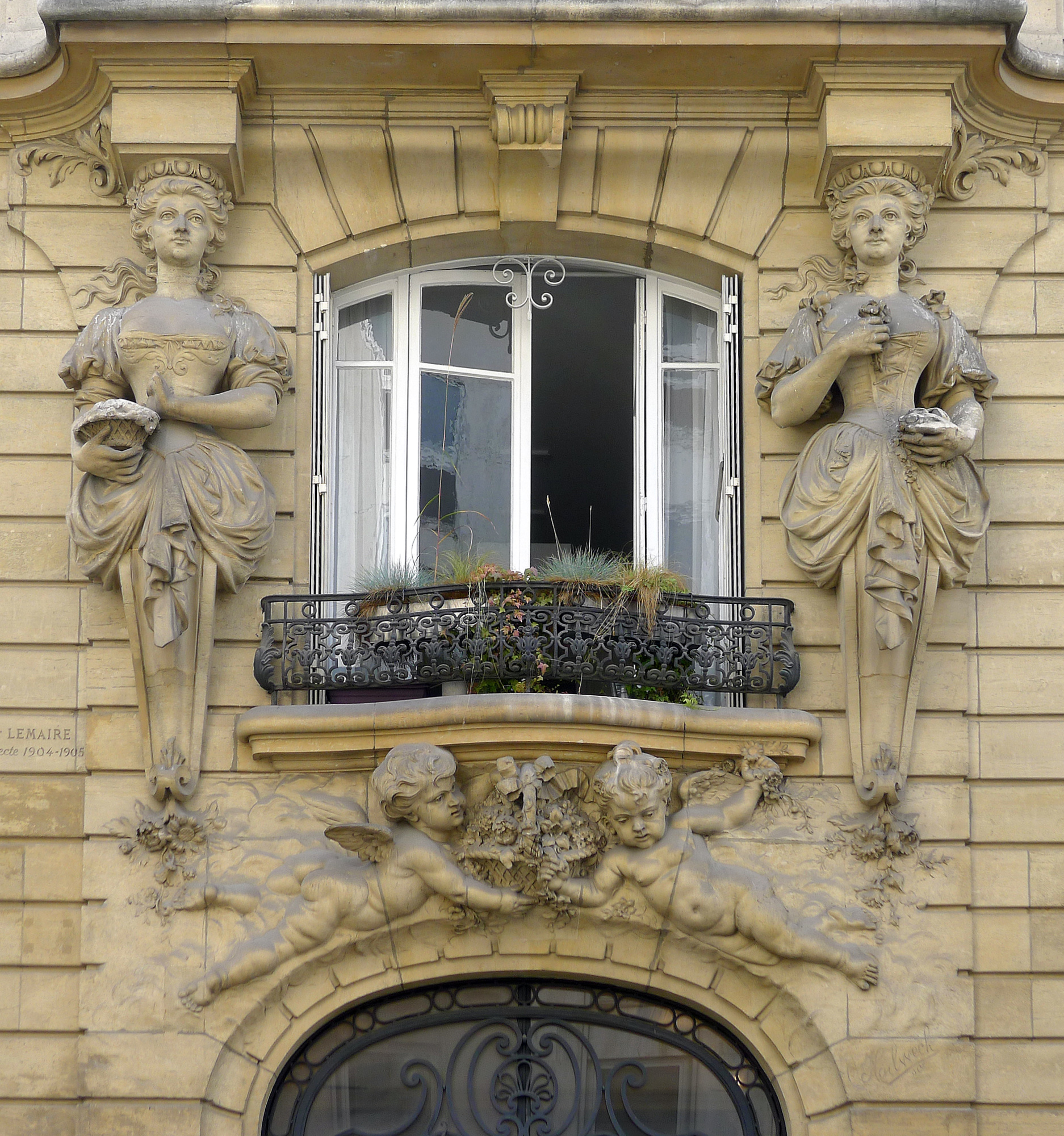
Rococo Revival caryatids of Rue Notre-Dame-des-Champs no. 82, Paris, designed by Constant Lemaire and sculpted by Louis Hollweck, 1904-1905

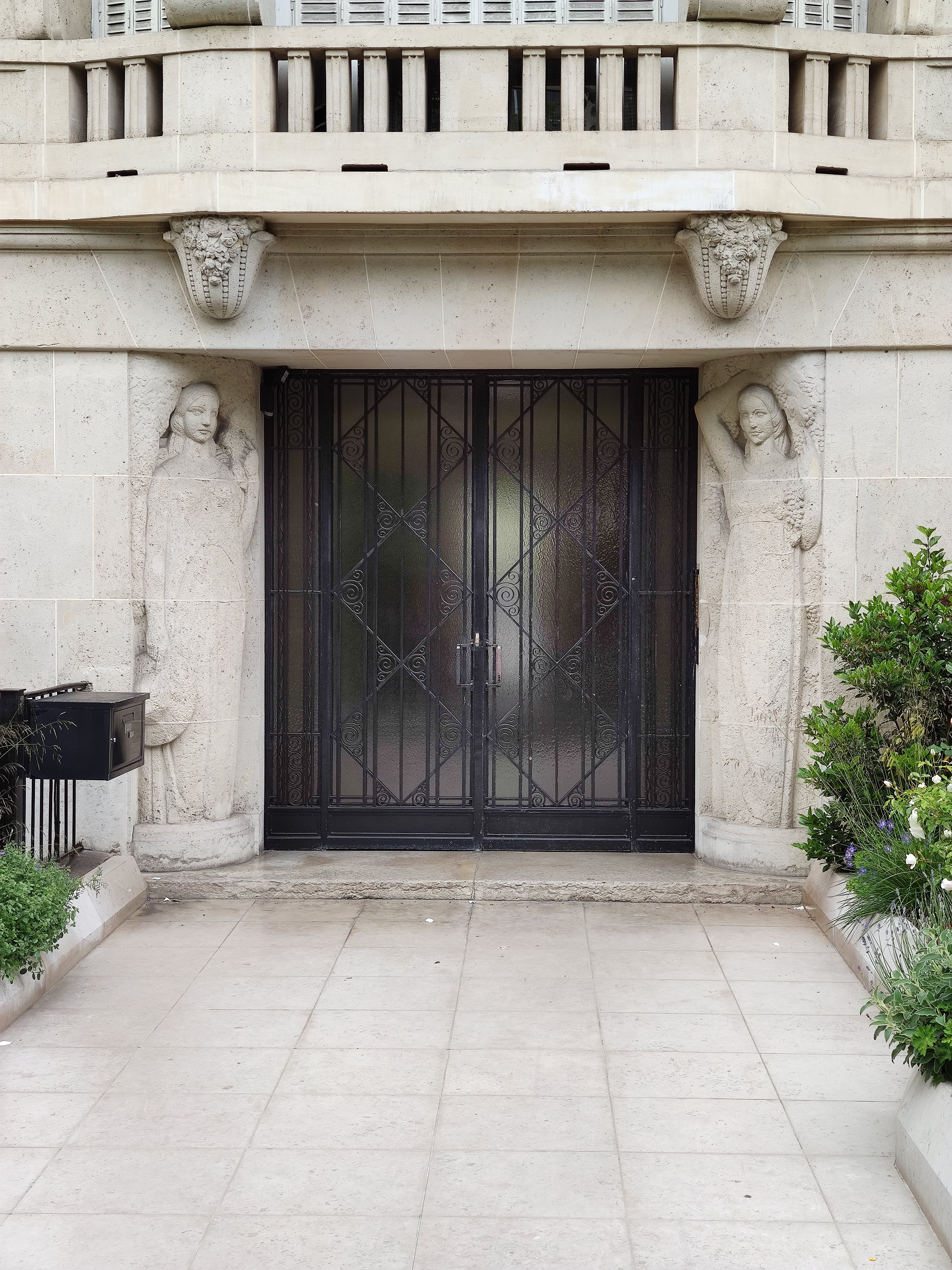
Art Deco caryatids of Avenue Henri-Martin no. 90, Paris, by Charles Labro, 1927

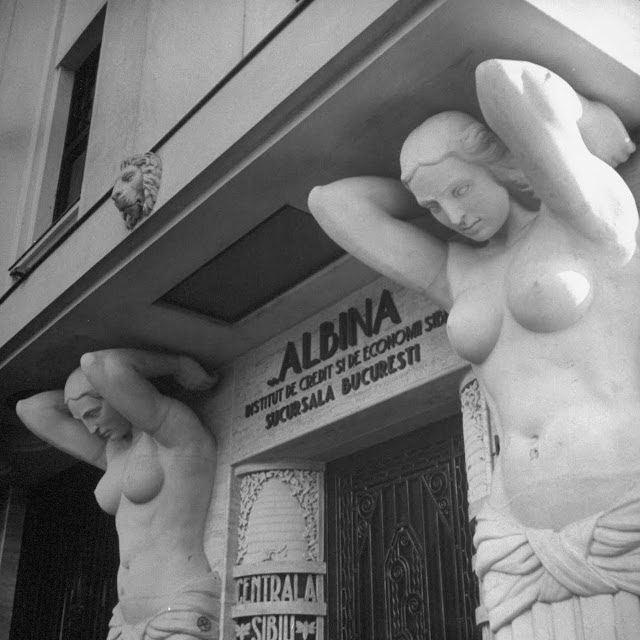
Art Deco caryatids on Banca Albina (Strada Edgar Quinet no. 6), Bucharest, unknown architect or sculptor, c.1930

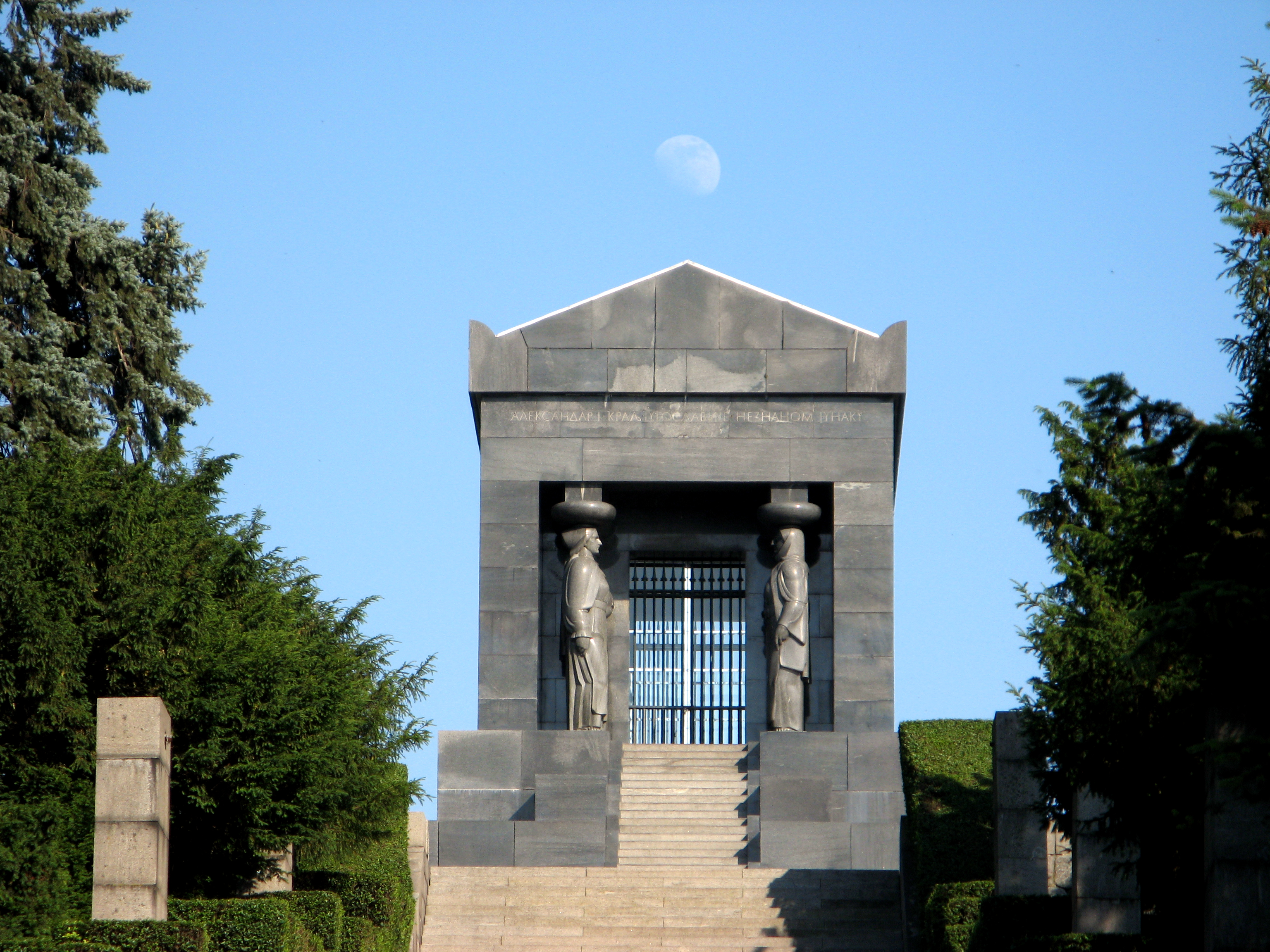
Art Deco caryatids of the Monument to the Unknown Hero, atop Mount Avala, south-east of Belgrade, Serbia, wirhcaryatids representing all the peoples of the Kingdom of Yugoslavia, by Ivan Meštrović, 1934–1938

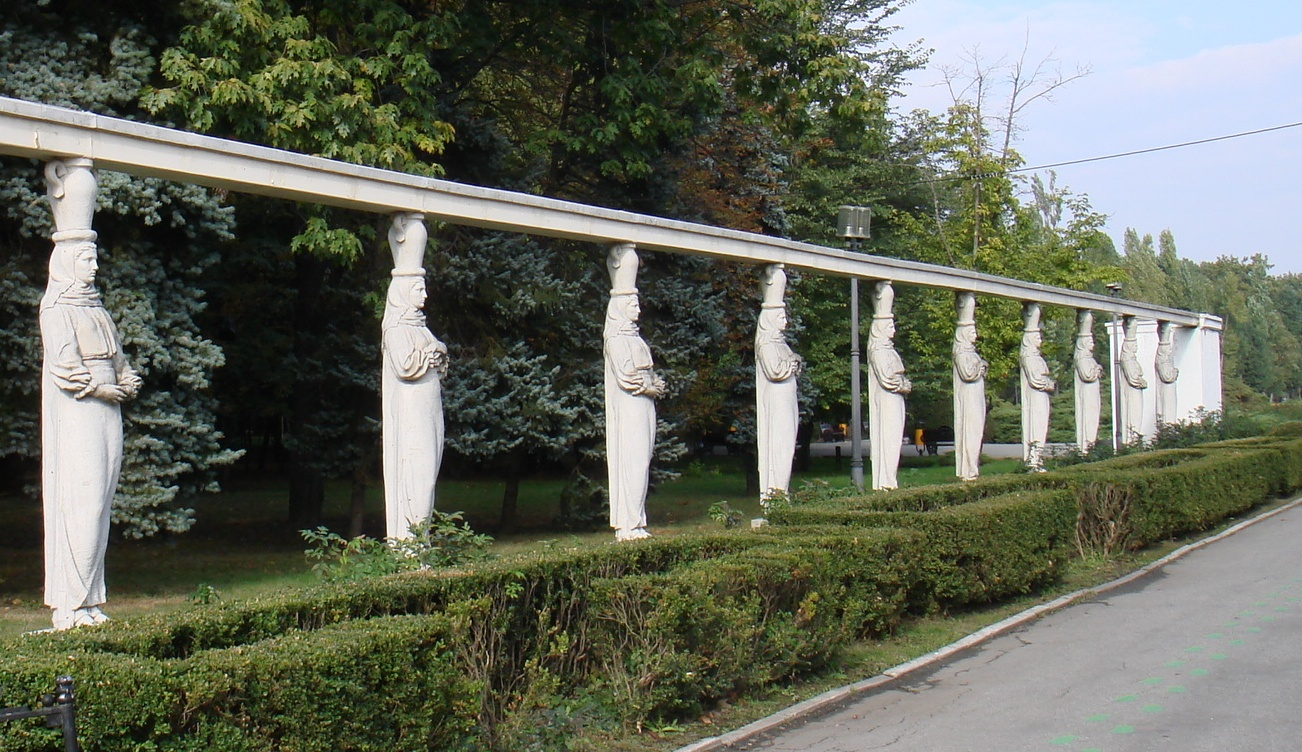
Neoclassical caryatids of the Alley of Caryatids in the Herăstrău Park, Bucharest, dressed like Romanian peasant women, sculpted by Constantin Ricci, 1939

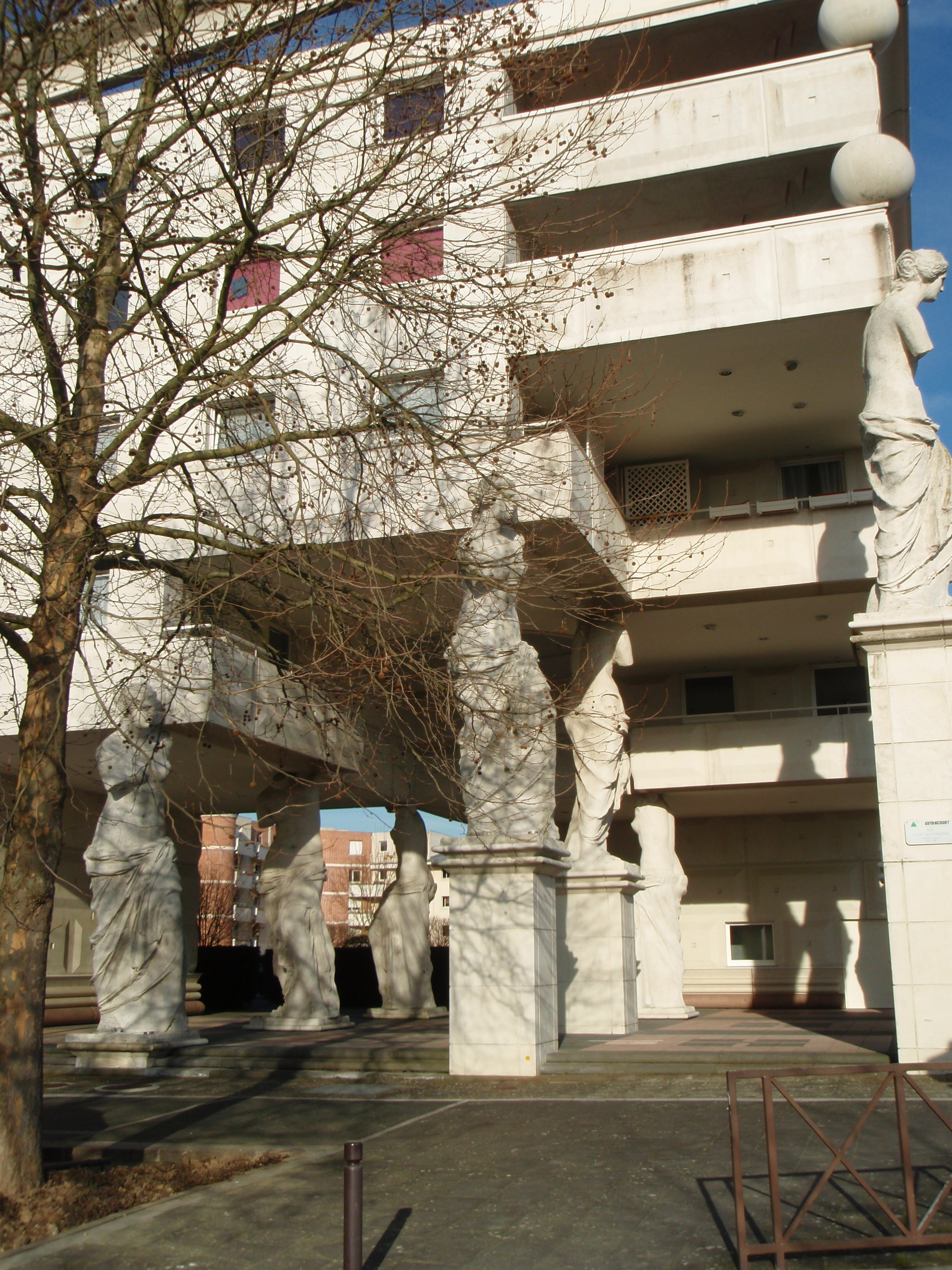
Postmodern Venus de Milo caryatids of Rue Frank Lloyd Wright no. 14, Guyancourt, France, by Manuel Núñez Yanowsky, 1992

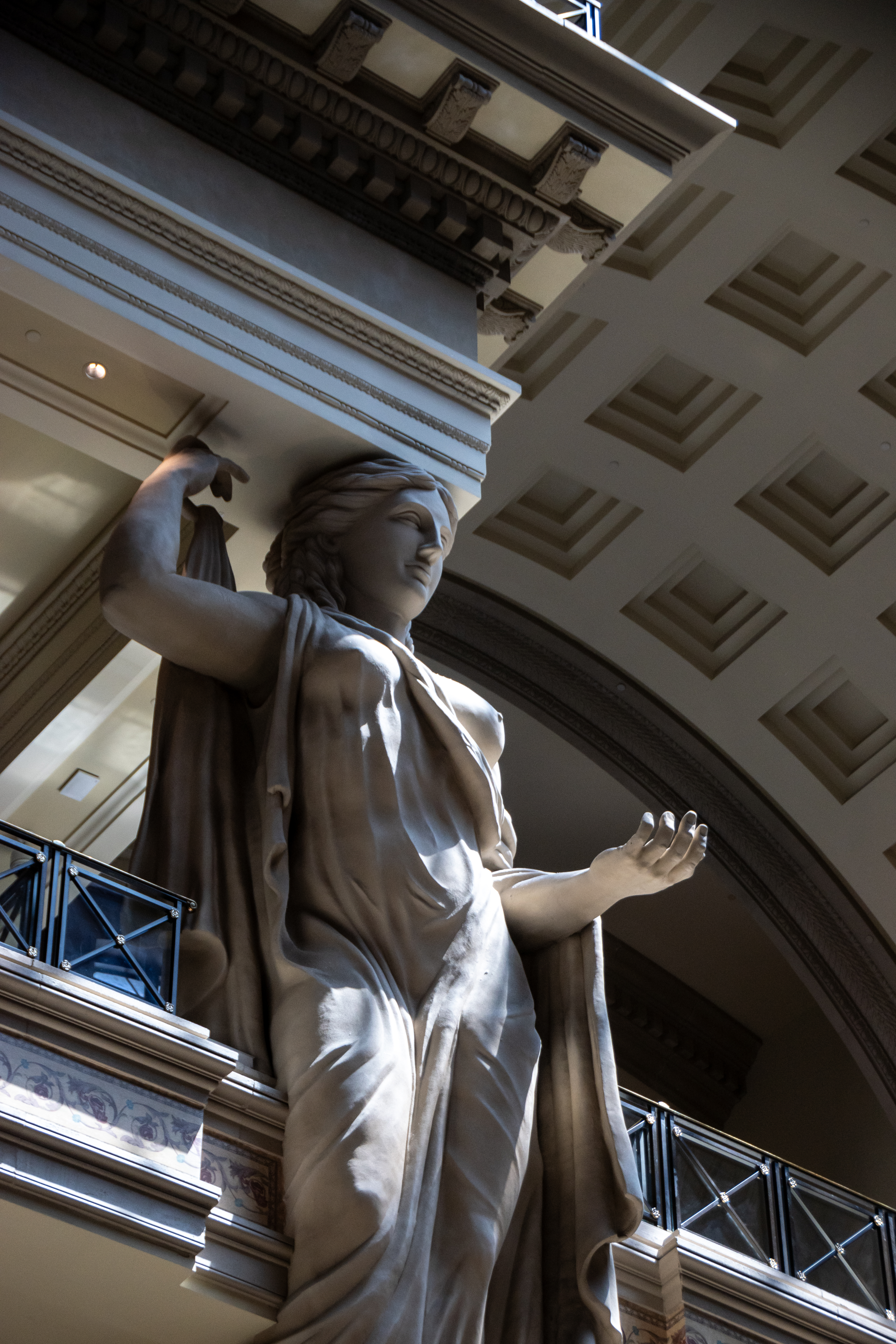
Caryatid inside the Forum Shops at Caesars Palace, Las Vegas, unknown architect or sculptor, 1992

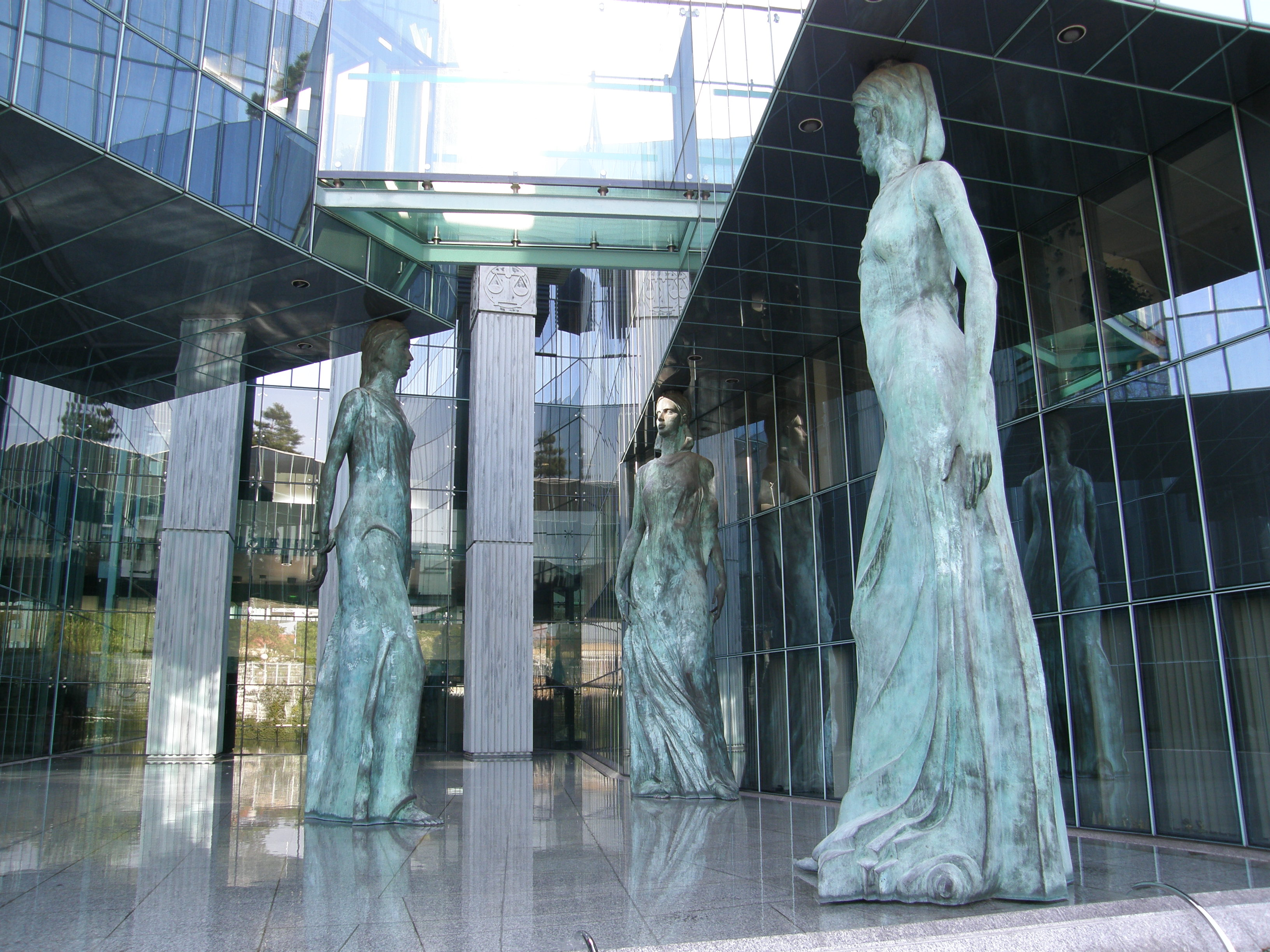
Postmodern caryatids of the Supreme Court of Poland, Warsaw, by Marek Budzynski and Zbigniew Badowski, 1996-1999

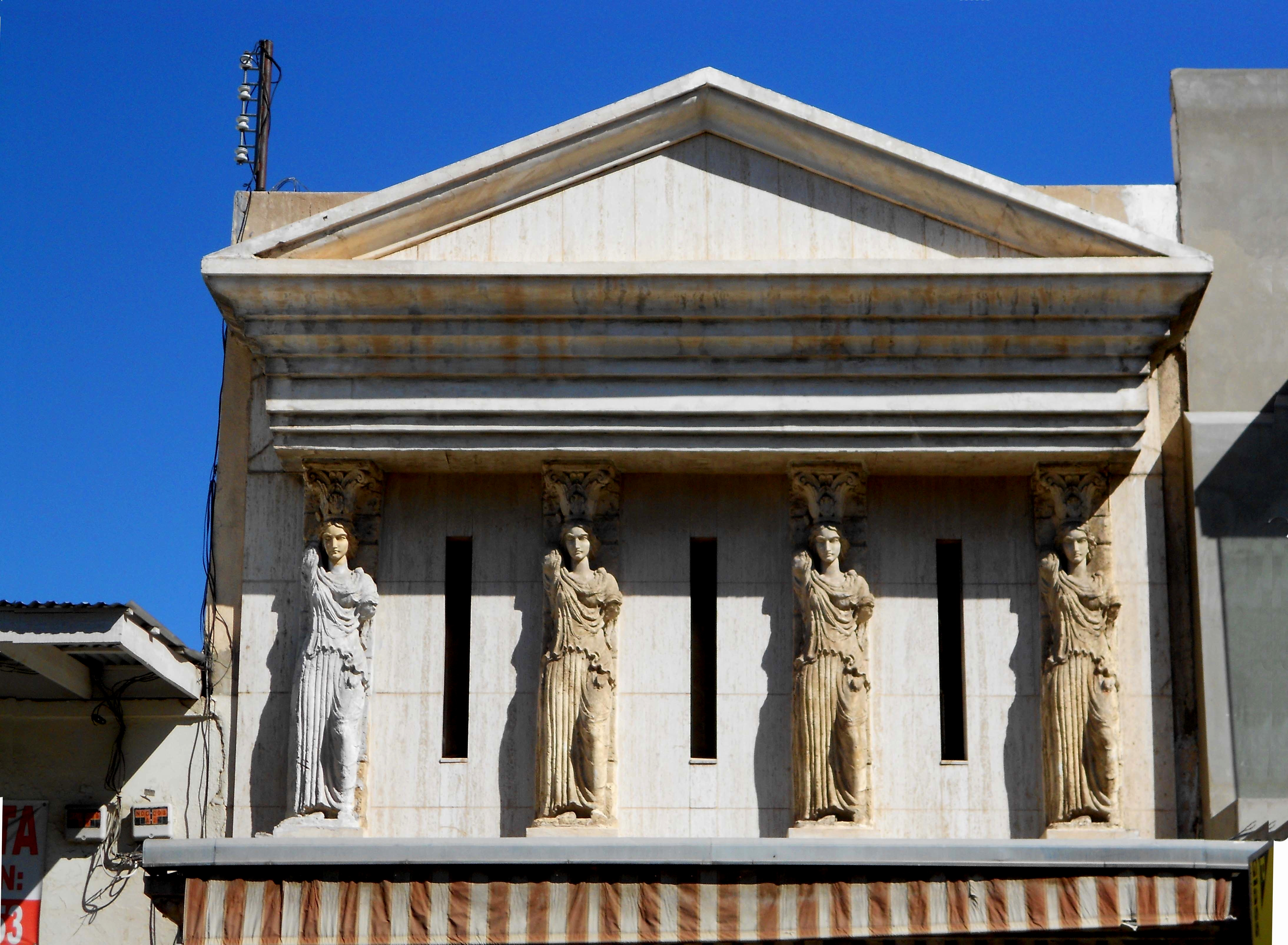
Postmodern cast stone caryatids in Nogales, Mexico, unknown architect, unknown date

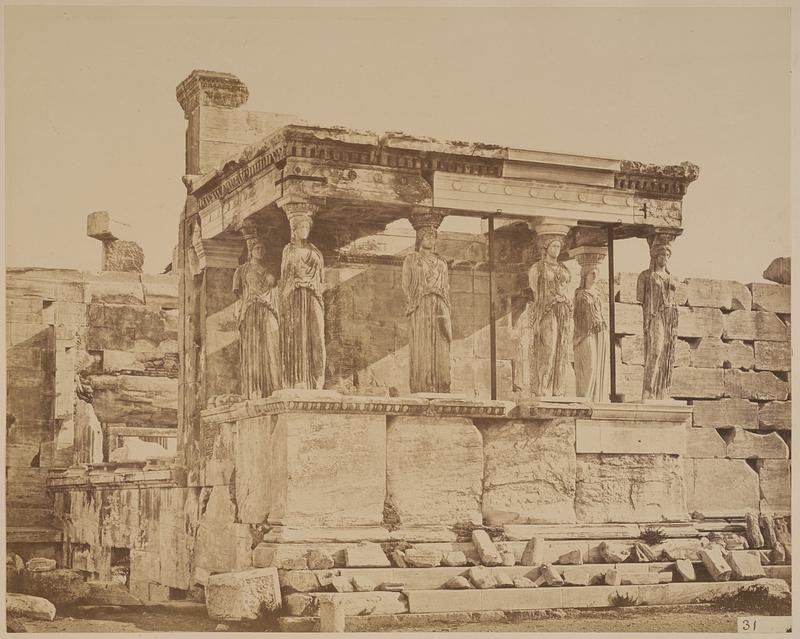
Caryatides, c. 1865; from the Nicholas Catsimpoolas Collection of the Boston Public Library

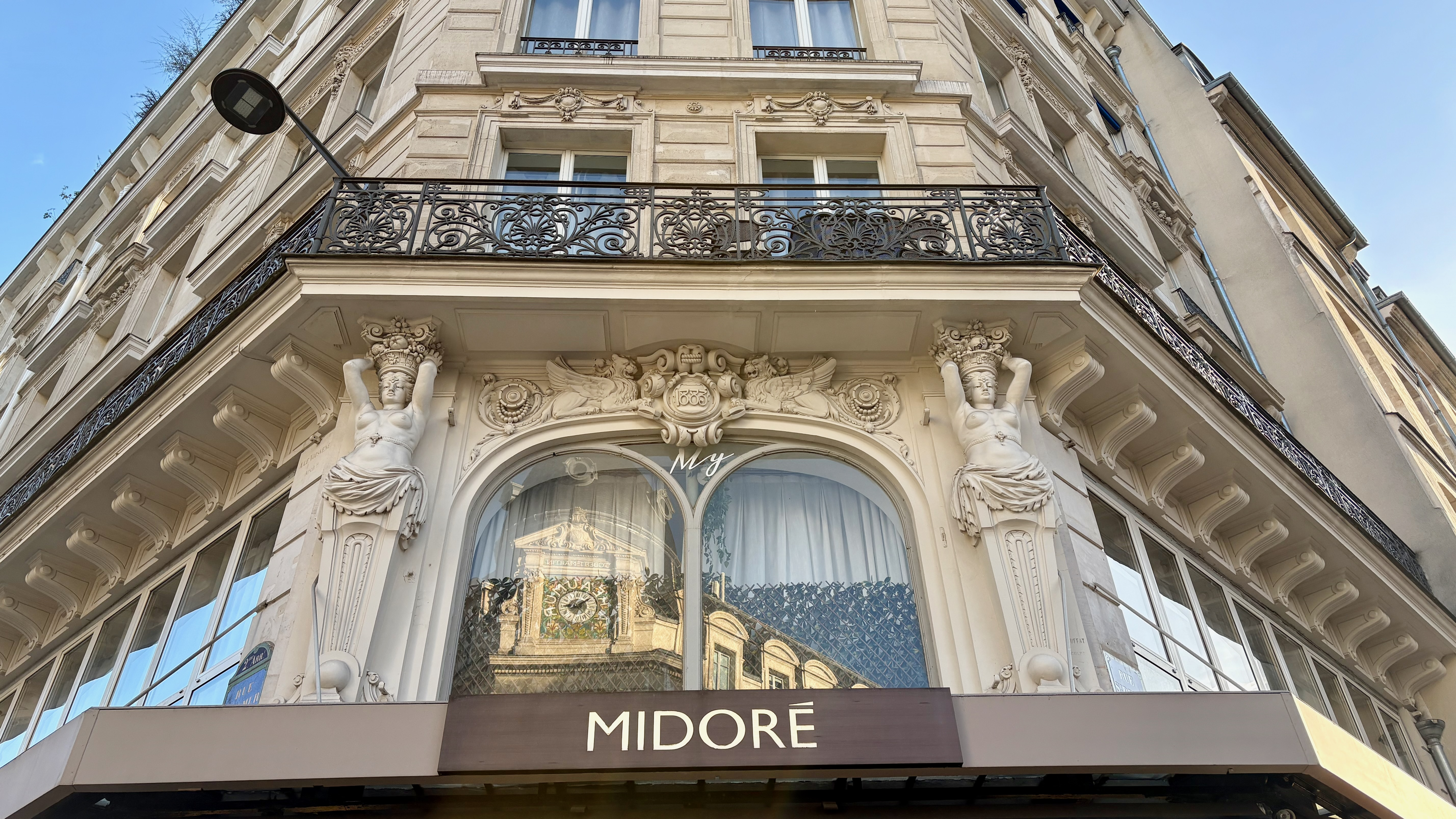
Sheathed caryatids carved by Léon Ruffat. They are located in Paris at 59 rue Réaumur, on the corner with rue Saint-Denis, on a building designed by Albert le Voisvenel in 1883.

== See also ==
- Caryatid stools in African art
- Term (architecture)
- The Sphere: Große Kugelkaryatide (Great Spherical Caryatid) – WTC sculpture by Fritz Koenig
- A Greek Tragedy, 1987 Oscar-winning animated short about three caryatid statues.
