= Postfeminism =

View of feminism as outdated

Postfeminism (alternatively rendered as post-feminism) is an alleged decrease in popular support for feminism from the 1990s onwards. It can be considered a critical way of understanding the changed relations among feminism, femininity and popular culture. The term is sometimes confused with subsequent feminisms such as postmodern feminism, xenofeminism, and the fourth wave.

Research conducted at Kent State University in the 2000s narrowed postfeminism to four main claims: support for feminism declined; women began hating feminism and feminists; society had already attained social equality, thus making feminism outdated; and the label "feminist" has a negative stigma.

== History of the term ==
One of the earliest modern uses of the term was in Susan Bolotin's 1982 article "Voices of the Post-Feminist Generation", published in New York Times Magazine. This article was based on a number of interviews with women who largely agreed with the goals of feminism, but did not identify as feminists.

In the 1990s the term became popular in academia and the media and was used in both complimentary and dismissive ways. Since then there has been confusion surrounding the intended meaning of "post" in the context of "postfeminism". "Post" offers to situate feminism in history by proclaiming the end of this history. It then confirms feminist history as a thing of the past. However, some claim that it is impossible that feminism could be aligned with "post" when it is unthinkable, as it would be the same as calling the current world a post racist, post-classist, and post-sexist society.

Contemporarily the term postfeminist is still used to refer to young women "who are thought to benefit from the women's movement through expanded access to employment and education and new family arrangements but at the same time do not push for further political change", Pamela Aronson, Professor of Sociology, asserts.

== Other uses ==
Toril Moi used the term in Sexual/Textual Politics (1985) to advocate a feminism that would deconstruct the equality-versus-difference binary.

In Lacan and Postfeminism (2000), author Elizabeth Wright identified a "positive reading" of postfeminism that, instead of indicating an overcoming of feminism, refers to post-structuralist critiques of second-wave feminism. From a similar perspective, Diane Davis affirmed that postfeminism is just a continuation of what first and second wave feminisms want.

In Feminism: A Beginner’s Guide (2010), Sally Scholz referred to the fourth wave as postfeminism.

== Works ==
In her 1994 book Who Stole Feminism? How Women Have Betrayed Women, Christina Hoff Sommers considers much of modern academic feminist theory and the feminist movement to be gynocentric. She labels this "gender feminism" and proposes "equity feminism"—an ideology that aims for full civil and legal equality. She argues that while the feminists she designates as gender feminists advocate preferential treatment and portray women as victims, equity feminism provides a viable alternative form of feminism. These descriptions and her other work have caused Hoff Sommers to be described as an antifeminist by some other feminists.

Some contemporary feminists, such as Katha Pollitt or Nadine Strossen, consider feminism to hold simply that "women are people." Views that separate the sexes rather than unite them are considered by these writers to be sexist rather than feminist.

== Relationship with pop culture ==
Postfeminism has been seen in media as a form of feminism that accepts popular culture instead of rejecting it, as was typical with second wave feminists. Many popular shows from the 1990s and early 2000s are considered to be postfeminist works because they tend to focus on women who are empowered by popular cultural representations of other women. Because of this, postfeminists claimed that such media was more accessible and inclusive than past representations of women in the media; however, some feminists believe that postfeminist works focus too much on white, middle-class women. Such shows and movies include The Devil Wears Prada, Xena: Warrior Princess, The Princess Diaries, Buffy the Vampire Slayer and Sex and the City. Many of these works also involve women monitoring their appearance as a form of self-management, be it in the form of dieting, exercise, or—most popularly—makeover scenes.

Postfeminist literature—also known as chick lit—has been criticized by feminists for similar themes and notions. However, the genre is also praised for being confident, witty, and complicated, bringing in feminist themes, revolving around women, and reinventing standards of fiction. Examples can also be found in Pretty Little Liars. The novels explore the complexity of girlhood in a society that assumes gender equality, which is in line with postfeminism. The constant surveillance and self policing of the series' protagonists depicts the performance of heterosexuality, hyperfemininity, and critical gaze forced upon girls. The materialism and performance from the girls in Pretty Little Liars critiques the notion that society has full gender equality, and thus offers a critique of postfeminism.

== Criticism ==
Susan Faludi argues in Backlash: The Undeclared War Against American Women (1991) that a backlash against second-wave feminism had successfully re-defined feminism through its terms. It was constructed by the media and, without reliable evidence, pointed to the women's liberation movement as the source of many of the problems alleged to be plaguing women in the late 1980s. According to her, this type of backlash is a historical trend, recurring when it appeared that women had made substantial gains in their efforts to obtain equal rights.

Similarly, Amelia Jones claims that the postfeminist texts which emerged in the 1980s and 1990s portrayed second-wave feminism as a monolithic entity and were overly generalizing in their criticism.

Angela McRobbie suggests that adding the prefix post- to feminism undermined the strides that feminism made in achieving equality for everyone, including women. In McRobbie's opinion, postfeminism gave the impression that equality has been achieved and feminists could now focus on something else entirely. She believed that postfeminism was most clearly seen on so-called feminist media products, such as Bridget Jones's Diary, Sex and the City, and Ally McBeal. Female characters like Bridget Jones and Carrie Bradshaw claimed to be liberated and clearly enjoy their sexuality, but what they were constantly searching for was the one man who would make everything worthwhile.

In an article on print jewelry advertisements in Singapore, Michelle Lazar analyses how the construction of 'postfeminist' femininity has given rise to a neoliberal hybrid "pronounced sense of self or 'I-dentity'". She states that the increasing number of female wage earners has led to advertisers updating their image of women but that "through this hybrid postfeminist I-dentity, advertisers have found a way to reinstall a new normativity that coexists with the status quo". Postfeminist ads and fashion have been criticized for using femininity as a commodity veiled as liberation.

== See also ==
- Angela McRobbie, Professor for Communications at Goldsmiths, University of London
- Choice feminism
- Gender studies
- Individualist feminism
- Lad culture
- Lipstick feminism
- Rosalind Gill, Professor of Social and Cultural Analysis at King's College, London
- Third-wave feminism
