= Feminism in Francoist Spain and the democratic transition period =

Feminism in Francoist Spain and the democratic transition period took place in a specific socio-historical context. Spanish feminism went through several waves in the Francoist period. Broadly speaking, they are first-wave feminism taking place from the mid-nineteenth century to 1965, second-wave feminism taking place from 1965 to 1975, and third-wave feminism taking place from 1975 to 2012.

First wave Spanish feminism involved feminists trying to improve the lives of women at a time when patriarchy continued to be entrenched in Spanish society, this despite the revolutionary nature of the Second Spanish Republic when it came to the rights of women. Most first wave feminists had gone into exile or disappeared, or were imprisoned or condemned to death following the end of the Civil War. The feminists who remained tended to be guerrilla fighters. They coordinated their feminist activities with political parties and unions. Other feminists in this wave tended to use riots over economic conditions instead of industrial action to try effect change. The regime tried to repressive these riots as they felt they were incredibly subversive, challenging their definition of Spanish womanhood that confined women to the home. At the same time, the regime also created their own brand of state sanction anti-feminism. This was largely supported through the works of Sección Feminina.

Second-wave feminism emerged in the mid-1960s in response to other changes going on in Spanish society. Women began to create open women's groups and clandestine feminist organizations. They were influenced by feminists texts like Simone de Beauvoir's Le Deuxième Sexe and Betty Friedan's The Feminine Mystique, which had begun to be circulated more underground. 1975 UN International Women's Year would be a pivotal year for Spanish feminists, both inside and outside the regime's structure as it finally allowed the movement to emerge from the darkness and gain international connections. This would be followed up by the work of Movimiento Democrático de Mujeres who, along with Asociación Española de Mujeres Universitarias (AEMU), Asociación Española de Mujeres Separadas (AEMS), and housewife and Catholic women's associations (HOAC, JOC, MAS) would start Primeras Jornadas. This movement would develop a unified and democratic feminist definition and list of goals during the last days of Francoism and the first of the democratic transition.

Third-wave feminism emerged in Spain during the democratic transition period. It took on several broad forms including "feminismo reformista", which advocated for legal and social changes for women without challenging Spain's traditional gender roles. Another form was "feminismo socialista", also known as "feminismo ácrata", "radical" or "sexista". This form of feminism was tied around the specific class struggle of women, and believed that women must be involved in the political process in order to affect change. An example of this was the Partido Feminista. A third form of feminism was "feminismo de la igualdad" or "feminismo de la diferencia". Feminists attempted to be engaged in the democratic transition process, including the Spanish constitution of 1978, and the 1977, 1979 and 1982 general elections. They advocated for a number of causes including making contraception and abortion legal, ending adultery as a criminal offense, and legalizing divorce.

== Background ==
Feminism as a global movement begins in France following the end of the French Revolution, when in 1791 Olimpia de Gouges wrote a declaration of the rights of women and the citizen. The Frenchwoman went to the guillotine for her ideas. Her efforts marked the start of first-wave feminism. Her ideas were picked up by English speaking Mary Wollstonecraft. A New York textile factory caught on fire on 8 March 1908, with the owner trapping his female workers inside. He had been forcing them to work 10-hour days, making fabric of mauve and lilac color. 129 workers died in the fire. The colors of the fabric they were working on were chosen as the symbol of the international women's rights movement. Two years later, at the Second International Conference of Socialist women, German revolutionary Clara Zetkin proposed that 8 March be honored as a day in memory of working women. The day has been celebrated as International Women's Day or International Working Women's Day ever since. For women at that meeting, the day was about demanding the right to work without discrimination. The day would not be celebrated widely in Spain until 1975.

Spanish feminism first developed in the late 1800s. French, Italian, Germany and American feminism all developed differently from Spain because those countries existed under more democratically ideal governments, both during the Second Republic and during the Francoist period.

Spanish definitions of feminism and the study of the differences between men and women differ from English speaking definitions, in that Spain utilizes a sex based biological difference as the foundation of, whereas English speakers use a gender based approach focusing on different masculine and feminine traits, borrowing from the ideas of Simone de Beauvoir who said that women are not born but made by their experiences. In a Spanish context, gender is often used only to avoid using the word feminism.

Much of the study of feminism uses Anglo-Saxon models of discourse. According to Italian academics like Rosi Braidotti, Gianna Pomata and Paola di Cor, this model can be problematic in the context of Mediterranean feminism as it ignores specific cultural baggage for women from the region. To compensate for this, Pomata suggests further elaboration of socio-historical context be given to properly situate this feminism in a broader global context. These models are also particularly problematic in a Spanish context as they fail to address the very nature of Francoism that sought to purge all female identity from society through forced assimilation legitimized by fear and violence. In this context, Spanish feminism acknowledges three distinct groups of women: Women who accepted the regime imposed patriarchal model; Women who found degrees of independence within the regime through participation in groups like Sección Femenina, Acción Católica and "chicas topolino"; and Women who felt repressed by the regime and participated in political resistance against the regime.

Waves are used as a metaphor to explain different movements in feminism, while suggesting a fluidity between them with different generations of feminists riding between them. Each wave is defined individuals generational experiences and involvement with feminist, and the evolution of their ideas and the resources they have to support their feminist goals. These can all change as individuals age, furthering the wave metaphor. First-wave feminism was about the rights of citizenship for women, and getting the right to vote. Second-wave feminism was in response to women entering the labor market and higher education in large numbers, and having the ability to decide their own trajectory within these domains. Third-wave was about having full legal equality under the law, including the right to control their bodies in the same way men could. All waves are unified by their subversion of gender roles and their challenge to hierarchical patriarchal spaces. A common feature of all the different waves of Spanish feminism is they were based on a realization that the reality of biological sex differences should not lead to social marginalization and exclusion from certain parts of life. Spanish feminism continually challenged in this period the hierarchy of differences between men and women. Feminism in Spain is defined around seeking equality for women.

== History ==
Spanish feminism went through several waves in the Francoist period. Broadly speaking, they are first-wave feminism taking place from the mid-nineteenth century to 1965, second-wave feminism taking place from 1965 to 1975, and third-wave feminism taking place from 1975 to 2012.

=== First-wave feminism in the Franco period (1939 - 1965) ===
First-wave Spanish feminism was about women assisting other women in improving their lives. Despite the revolutionary nature of the Second Spanish Republic and the Spanish Civil War as it related to the rights of women, neither resulted in a fundamental change in Spanish society's attitudes towards women. Patriarchy continued to play a huge role in the lives of Spanish women across both periods, and then into the Franco era. Following the end of the Spanish Civil War, many of Spain's leading feminists were forced into exile. Feminists in the Francoist period were largely divided by age and side of the Civil War they were affiliated with. The two primary age groups were those women born between 1910 and 1930, and those women born between 1930 and 1950. For Republican women born between 1910 and 1930, they often found themselves forced to submit in ways they had not had to previously and many of these feminists faced active persecution. Feminism and socialism continued to have a fraught relationship during the early Francoist period.

One of the issues for feminists in the 1930s, 1940s, 1950s and 1960s was they never were able to successfully challenge the regime's definition of womanhood as motherhood. Those who did were not viewed as representative of the movements they came from. This included feminists in the pre-Civil War period like Hildegart Rodriguez and Lucia Sánchez Saornil. More common was for feminists to embrace the concept of motherhood, with Federica Montseny among this type of feminist.

Anarchist feminists ideas about abortion in the early Francoist period were informed by opinions exemplified by Director of General Health and Social Assistance of the Generalitat of Catalonia Félix Martí Ibáñez during the Civil War, with a policy called "Eugenics Reform" that included support of abortion by removing it as a clandestine practice. Their policies also included support of working-class women, by attempting to provide them with economic relief so elective abortions were not needed. During the Civil War, the only women's anti-fascist group to support the legalization of abortion was POUM. Mujeres Libres never mentioned abortion nor contraception. Support of policies in favor of legalization consequently largely were made by leftist men. Women did not see abortion as part of a policy of women's liberation.

During the early Francoist period, mainstream feminists largely allowed the regime to dominate the narrative on birth control and sex education. They did not challenge the Francoist government through their few state sanctioned organizations like Sección Femenina on the legalization of contraception.

Most of the resistance in Spain during the early Franco period was a result of guerrilla fighters, who coordinated their activities in the interior both with political militants in exile and with militants in prison. Most of Spain's militant women who remained in Spain were in prison or had gone underground where they served as important figures in coordinating activities between all three groups. Prisons in this case proved invaluable for many militant women as they allowed them to rebuild their activist networks or create new networks. They were also one of the biggest sources of female resistance to the Franco regime by exercising daily resistance behind prison walls. Women were generally not part of the founding of guerrilla groups operating in the 1940s. They were brought in later, as part of a disaffected class, through personal and political contacts. Almost all women involved with guerrilla groups were from rural areas and had family involved. This differed from the previous period, where many female fighters came from the middle class and more urban areas.

Most women in the 1940s were not politically active, involved with guerrilla groups or militants. They were women dealing with hardship, poverty and the imposition of gender norms that imposed on their everyday lives. Their process of coping and surviving often made their personal activities intersect with activism as they subtly challenged the regime and limits imposed by the regime.

The 1940s saw the emergence of the chicas topolino. Named after an Italian car, women in this movement wore wedge shoes with cork soles, skirts worn a little longer than the knee, nylon stockings and tight dresses. They went to dances and smoked. They desired to go to Chicote and smoke American cigarettes. They tried to imitate famous actresses like Amparo Rivelles, Concha Monte, Irene Dunne or Myrna Loy. They were most prominent on the Catalan coast, where they also scandalized people by wearing bikinis. In their day, this group of middle-class girls and women were the Spanish feminists of the 1970s.

For women who had abortions in the 1940s, they did not appear to do so out of any conscious effort to subvert the regime's ideological position around the role of women; rather, these women were trying to protect themselves, their families and their economic well-being by taking the only step available to them in the face of an unwanted pregnancy.

During the pre-Francoist period, women would sometimes use riots instead of industrial action to try effect change. This method of individual rebellion of protesting economic conditions that impacted them entailed less risk than similar events by male counterparts because women were largely immune to consequences because they were women. The Franco regime wanted to suppress this type of female activity when they came into power as they saw it as subversive and an attempt to destabilize them. Unlike earlier periods, they imprisoned women and punished them for leading food riots. Despite this, during the 1940s, women would still occasionally engage in individually organized riots around issues linked to their daily survival. One such protest led by women in the 1940s occurred outside the Prosecutor's Office in the town of Teruel over bread and hunger. Overall, these were rare, especially in rural areas where there was a heavy police presence and a lack of anonymity. The biggest acts of individual rebellion by women in the 1940s would consequently be denunciations of the Guardia Civil for marking her male relatives as being involved with subversive groups like communists. Carmen Ciprés was the most famous of this type of subversive. In near daily raids around 1944 and 1945 where the police were searching for her partner CNT militant and guerrilla fighter José Ramiá Ciprés, Carmen Ciprés would say things like "Yourself if you want to go to bed right now, I do not care about anything. If you want to go to bed right now, I'll sleep with you." in response to inquiries as to who was sleeping in a still warm bed.

During the Spanish Civil War, PCE adapted the slogan, "Men to front, women to the rearguard." (Spanish: "los hombres al frente, las mujeres a la retaguardia"). This gender divided thinking continued in the Francoist period as PCE rebuilt. Women were to be organized separately from male guerrilla groups, both in the interior and the exterior. With this thinking, Unión de Mujeres Españolas was created by the PCE, and renamed Unión de Mujeres Antifascistas Españolas (UMAE) in 1947. Dolores Ibarrurí was the president of UMAE. As its leader, she defined the organization, the role of women in PCE, what women should be doing in the interior and in exile, and how PCE involved women could resolve their militancy with their ability to be a good housewife and mother.

The 1960s would begin to see a change in major themes in women's writings, with women beginning to challenge their role in society and to argue more for women's rights. This represented both self-realization in women expressed in fiction and a begin to a return of Republican era thinking about women. These writers were not intending to subvert the Franco regime, the Catholic Church or their parents, but instead were about improving their own situations and creating more opportunities. These women were not ideologically united for a variety of reasons, including their educational backgrounds, shifting positions in regime sanctioned organizations like Sección Feminina, the lack of a clear ideological viewpoint from fascist influenced Francoism and that their beliefs contradicted societal norms which they needed to explore in more socially accepted methods to avoid censorship. A group of women novelist emerge to describe feminist life in post-Civil War Spain in this period. These women had started writing in the 1940s, with a second cohort joining them in the 1960s when censors began to relax.

Seminario de Estudios Sociólogicos sobre la Mujer was created in 1960. The liberal women's Catholic organization's purpose was end discrimination in education and prepare women to enter the wider Spanish society as members of the workforce, and had connections to 1960s and 1970s Spanish Women's Movement thanks to members like María, Condesa de Campo Alange. It became less important as later Spanish feminism rejected a Catholic-based model.

During this period, very few works of feminists writers were allowed. The major exceptions were the works of María Campo Alange and Mercedes Formica. Formica was one of the major supports of the 1958 Civil Code reforms that reduced restrictions placed on married Spanish women. Formica was active in developing a feminist consciousness in Madrid in this period. The 1927 book, La mujer moderna y sus derechos by Carmen de Burgos, Spain's Simone de Beauvoir, was banned by Franco. The book was considered the bible of early Spanish feminism. Following Franco's ban, the book was buried into an oblivion.

Having a higher profile enabled some women to speak more easily on women's issues. This was the case of Carmen de Icaza, Baroness de Claret. Her ties to the Franco regime and the Falangist movement always made her suspect in many circles. While she may have written about women more sympathetically than many of her contemporaries, her embrace of the right called into question if she was a real feminist.

==== Francoist anti-feminism ====
Francoist ideologies about womanhood and anti-feminism mirrored those of the Italian fascists and German Nazis of the 1930s and 1940s. Broader goals around women included utilizing them to increase the population, strengthen the family around a patriarchal structure and control the lives of women. Francoism stripped women of all their individual autonomy. It defined women based on their social morality. The state imposed this through legislative means. Women were to be "submissive, devoted and devout". José Antonio said that, "Real feminism should not consist in women wanting to carry out men's roles, now considered superior, but in imbuing themselves increasingly with the human and social dignity of feminine roles." Father Delgado Capeáns said in 1953 of feminism, "Modern feminism [...] is a symbol of decadence for many people and brings fatal ruile to many souls [ ... ] today's women, with short hair, shirt skirts, who gamble, drink and smoke [...] will bring sad and sorrowful consequences to humanity." He went on to suggest that feminism would make women into modern monsters in the mold of Queen Victoria, Catherine de' Medici or Catherine the Great.

Some feminists in Franco's Spain tried to subvert government goals and change policy by becoming directly involved in government institutions. The Castilian Association of Homemakers and Consumers was one organization that attracted the type of feminist that believed that change should come from within. They became regime accepted vehicles for female dissent.

===== Sección Feminina =====
One of the goals of the Women's Section was to use fascist ideology about the role of women and Falange's teachings in a woman's individual agency to attract leftist women who were seeking to enjoy some semblance of the freedoms they had enjoyed during the 1920s and 1930s. They did this in part through educational efforts and providing a political outlet.

Sección Femenina de Falange worked to depict feminism as a form of depravity. It associated feminism with drug abuse and other evils plaguing society. State supported feminism, expressed through Sección Femenina, offered Isabel the Catholic and Teresa of Avila as symbols for Spanish women to look up. They had first been used by Francoist women during the Civil War, and reminded women that their role was to become mothers and to engage in pious domesticity. A 1944 edition of Medina. Semanario de la SF said, "The life of every woman, despite what she may pretend, is nothing but a continuous desire to find somebody to whom she can succumb. Voluntary dependency, the offering of every minute, every desire and illusion is the most beautiful thing, because it implies the cleaning away of all the bad germs -- vanity, selfishness, frivolity -- by love."

The group offered classes for women. Their focus was on discrediting feminist discourse from the Second Republic and supporting the state in defining the role of women as wives and mothers. Sección Femenina did things like creating agricultural and adult schools, sports centers and libraries. They organized cultural groups and discussion groups. They published their own magazine. They worked to preserve traditional rural life. All of this was done with the underlying goal of encouraging traditional womanhood, of remaining in the home as a good daughter, and later as a good wife and mother. The pride that women got in completing these domestic tasks associated with Sección Femenina's teachings has been described by Guiliana Di Febo as Christian feminism.

=== Second-wave feminism (1965 - 1975) ===
The 1960s in Spain saw a generational shift in Spanish feminist in response to other changes going on in Spanish society. This included greater contact with foreign ideas as a result of emigration and tourism, increased educational and employment opportunities for women and major economic reforms. Feminism in the late Franco period and early transition period was not unified. It had many different political dimensions. These varying movements all intersected in their belief that the need for greater equality for women in Spain and the need to defend the rights of women. Feminism moved from being out the individual to being about the collective. It was during this period that second-wave feminism came to Spain.

Second-wave Spanish feminism was about the struggle for the rights of women in the context of the dictatorship. PCE would start in 1965 to promote this movement with MDM, creating a feminist political orientation around building solidarity for women and assisting imprisoned political figures. MDM launched its movement in Madrid by establishing associations among the housewives of the Tetuán and Getafe in 1969. In 1972, Asociación Castellana de Amas de Casa y Consumidora was created to widen the group's ability to attract members.

Second-wave feminism entered the comic community by the early 1970s. It was manifested in Spanish comics in two ways. The first was that it increased the number of women involved in comics production as writers and artists. The second was it transformed how female characters were portrayed, making women less passive and less likely to be purely sexual beings.

Feminist women were involved in unrecognized roles in PCE, PSOE and other political organizations, generally working towards supporting broader political goals not specific to women. Starting in the 1960s, women's groups and feminists organizations began to emerge. Women's associations were tolerated by the regime but were not completely legal. Many met clandestinely, and they were few in number. This began to change when in 1964, women's associations were legally allowed. In 1974 and 1975, there were no full women's associations as the government required they have more than 19 members, and the Catholic Church was still involved in trying to discourage the official recognition of such associations. From around 1965 to 1975, Spanish feminism was the work of these women's organizations, women's sections of leftist political parties, and specific purpose women's groups such as women university students, and women lawyers. These feminists who started creating groups in the mid-1960s often came from unionist and political groups. These associations would set up an uneasy relationship between feminists and unionists, with unionists supporting feminist goals.

Seminario de Estudios Sociólogics sobre la Mujer was created in 1960. The liberal women's Catholic organization's purpose was end discrimination in education and prepare women to enter the wider Spanish society as members of the workforce, and had connections to 1960s and 1970s Spanish Women's Movement thanks to members like María, Condesa de Campo Alange. It became less important as later Spanish feminism rejected a Catholic-based model.

Many of the women's organizations in the early 1970s were attached to neighborhood groups. They were less about feminism, and more about supporting anti-Franco activities, or political or unionist goals.

By the mid-1960s, Lidia Falcón, a Barcelona-based lawyer, had established herself as a leading feminist in Spain at a time when the women's liberation movement in the country lacked a formalized ideology and structure found in other European countries and the United States. At the same time, feminists texts like Simone de Beauvoir's Le Deuxième Sexe and Betty Friedan's The Feminine Mystique began to be circulated more underground, helping to shape the emerging Women's Movement. During the 1960s and 1970s, feminists inside and outside Spain began to recognize the important role played by Mujeres Libres during the Spanish Civil War.

In 1969 at the Federación Internacional de Mujeres de Carreras Jurídicas conference, María Telo Núñez in Madrid presented a paper on the rights of women under Spain's civil code. This presentation would inspire the creation in 1971 of the Asociación Española de Mujeres Juristas. The group's goal was to reform family law, which was done with the changes on 2 May 1975.

Frente Armado Feminista was feminist group created around 1970, dedicated to the violent overthrow of the Franco regime. Its members included Isabel Grau, Inés Fuentes Fernández, Marta Aguilar Gallego, Pilar Ortega García and Maite Caballero Hidalgo. The Valencia-based group had plans to attack an annex at the Trinitat Vella women's prison in Barcelona run by the nun of the Crusades of Christ the King. As none in the group had connections to student movements or unionist activities, they believed they were safe from state surveillance. The group created their own manifesto of their demands for the regime as it related to the rights of women. Police discovered their plans, and the women tried to hide all evidence of their plans among other documents, manifestos, books and magazines. Nonetheless, they still found their copy of The Manual of the Urban Guerrilla. The police violently beat the women, and in the coming days, most would die as a result of unclear reasons of suicide or by extrajudicial killings. Consequently, as a result of this incident and the detention of other PCE connected students and staff, the Governing Board of the University of Valencia started enacting repressive policies against teachers, were more political in not renewing teaching contracts and took sanctions against students.

Because abortion was illegal in Spain, during the 1970s, Spanish women who could afford it went to London to get abortions. In 1974, 2,863 Spanish women had abortions in London. In 1975, 4,230 Spanish women had abortions in London. In the a four-month period in 1976, 2,726 Spanish women went to London for abortions. In 1979, 16,433 Spanish women had abortions in London. In 1981, 22,000 Spanish women went to London for an abortion. Poor women with few options would sometimes have an abortion by having someone hit them in the stomach. The first organization created about women's reproductive health and birth control was opened in Madrid in 1976 by Federico Rubio. Asociación de Mujeres de Aluche was one of the earlier women's reproductive health and birth control centers, creating in the first years after the end of the dictatorship.

Divorce in the late Franco period and early transition period was available via ecclesiastical tribunals. These courts could nullify marriage for a fee. Consequently, they were mostly only available to the rich, with the most famous types of this nullification involving Isabel Preysler and Carmencita Martínez Bordiú.

==== 1975 UN International Women's Year ====
Sección Femenina had been trying to organize the Congreso Internacional de la Mujer since 1967. Their initial efforts were delayed several years, including for budget reasons in 1969. The congress was finally held in 1970 from 7–14 June in Madrid. 900 people from 44 countries attended. This conference would play an important role in the establishing of the United Nations Year of the Woman in 1975. People and groups Federation Internationale des Femmes des Carrières Juridiques, founder María Telo, Universidad de Madrid sociologist and professor María Ángeles Durán, María Moliner and María del Campo Alange, the Associations of Housewives and Italian historian Giulia Gadaleta. Most came as individuals, not as official representatives of different organizations. This was because many participants were hesitant to have their organizations being seen as supporting an organization, Sección Femenina, that they considered retrograde when it came to women's rights. Despite many attendees thinking abortion, divorce and contraceptive were important to understanding the situation of Spanish women, these topics were largely out of bounds because of Sección Femenina's positions on them. Sección Femenina tried to drive working groups to discuss the needs of children and how to incorporate women into public life. The conference Sección Feminina contact with other Spanish and international women's groups. It was part of a reality that Sección Feminina could no longer ignore these groups as Spain started to undergo social upheaval because of contradictory demands by the regime placed upon women.

The intention to organize the International Year of Women was announced by the United Nations in 1972. Sección Feminina then launched a political campaign to be the point organization for United Nation plans around women. Absent any other organization capable of doing this, the government agreed and published their decision in Decreto 950/1974. The regime followed this with statements about plans to reform or eliminate laws that incapacitated women. In dealing with the evolving problems of women, President of Government Arias Navarro said in 1974 ahead of the International Year of the Woman, that Spain needed a "genuine and profitable Spanish feminism", a feminism that had Spanish origins and was free of foreign influence. It should not come from "communities of traditions well differentiated to ours or that are in a very different state of development." Navarro was likely indicating support for Sección Femenina, and not for other qualified Spanish feminists of the period like Mercedes Formica and Maria Angeles Durán. Ahead of the Year of the Woman, the government created eight commissions to investigate the status of Spanish women. They were, "The International Year of Women in the United Nations and in organizations international "; "Analysis of the situation of the maladjusted and marginalized woman"; "Women and social welfare"; "Women and work"; "Women in education and in culture "; "Women in socio-economic development"; "The woman and the family"; and" Women in the civic-social and political community". The government used reports from these commissions to produce two reports that were published in 1975. They were La situación de la mujer en España and Memoria del Año Internacional de la Mujer. Despite the intentions of organizers and the government, the United Nations Year of Women was largely ignored or unknown by most women in Spain.

United Nations's 1975 International Women's Year was hugely influential in Spain as it connected with an emerging feminist movement in Spain. Spanish women took advantage of the 1975 United Nations International Year of Women to press home concerns they had about women's rights with the regime. They pointed out the backwardness and discriminatory nature of laws about women. Lawyer María Telo played an important role in the legal easing of restrictions for women in May 1975. The regime allowed the lifting of restrictions as part of its attempts to change its international image in light of the 1975 UN International Year of Women.

In 1975, the UN International Year of Women, Banco de Bilbao made a television advertisement encouraging women to open accounts with them that said, "That determined walk is the symbol of the woman of our day, of the responsible woman who works and lives her time. And to her, for the first time, a bank addresses this message of friendship, this tribute of admiration."

Because of Spain's feminist connections with labor and political organizations, the 8 March International Women's Day were more known as Día Internacional de la Mujer Trabajadora, and involved a general strike to show the importance of women in the labor efforts.

==== Movimiento Democrático de Mujeres ====
Movimiento Democrático de Mujeres (MDM) was one of the most important anti-Francoist organizations. They played a critical role in the feminist resurgence in the late-Francoist period in Spain and in the democratic transition.

MDMnwas created in 1965 in Barcelona by communist and Catalan socialist women. MDM's main issues reflected those of PCE, including lowering food prices, improved pedestrian safety by creating more crosswalks, and showing solidarity with political prisoners. PCE believed these were the only issues for which housewives could be mobilized. The organization quickly found covert support among other women in northern Spain as they tried to accomplish socio-political goals. Because of their overt feminist ideologies, some supporters worried MDM's "doble militancia" would diminish their effectiveness as they sought to work towards concrete political goals. The organization drew from two different eras of Spanish feminists. The first was a community of older women who had suffered the most under the change from the Second Republic to Francoist Spain. The second group was known as the "pro preso" generation who came of age through clandestine neighborhood led activism. This meant the organization's feminist goals were sometimes in conflict and not well defined as members had to navigate ideological differences in what being a feminist meant. In 1969, these ideological differences between PCE and Catalan socialists would lead to the organization splitting in Catalonia. Because PCE was more organized in Madrid, MDM continued there and in other PCE strongholds.

MDM attempted to infiltrate the regime sanctioned Castilian Association of Homemakers and Consumers as part of their clandestine efforts to challenge the regime's restriction on activist activities. With those being unsuccessful, MDM established their own organization, the Castilian Housewives Association (Spanish: Asociación de Amas de Casa Castellana).

In 1974, MDM changed their name to Movimeinto para la Liberación de la Mujer (MDM-MLM) and became more explicitly feminist in their political activism. In this new period of activity, they were attacked by many leftist organizations who believed they were too bourgeois and that a focus on feminist goals was a distraction from the broader class based struggle in Spain. At the same time, MDM-MLM also challenged traditional patriarchal left wing views on women. They were also attacked by the right for being communists, anti-woman and anti-regime. The group faced internal divisions on whether they needed male activists to achieve women's political goals, or whether they should remain sex segregated so as to challenge patriarchal beliefs.

==== Primeras Jornadas ====
Starting in 1974 in Barcelona, contacts were made among various feminist groups such as Asociación Española de Mujeres Universitarias (AEMU), Asociación Española de Mujeres Separadas (AEMS), and housewife and Catholic women's associations (HOAC, JOC, MAS) to begin to develop a unified and democratic feminist definition and list of goals. A program was created, a platform was developed and the idea of organizing a conference was floated. Groups from Barcelona first ratified the document, with women's groups from Galicia, Valencia and Andalusia soon also signing it. From this, the seeds of the Primeras Jornadas por la Liberación de la Mujer would take root, with the semi-clandestine conference being held only two weeks after Franco's death in the Concepción neighborhood in Madrid from 6–8 December 1975 attended 500 women. At the conference, participants approved of a political resolution, signed by over 100 participants that was then published in the media. Topics mentioned in the manifesto included education, employment, family, and society.

The 1975 document of the Primeras Jornadas por la Liberación de la Mujer asked for:

Primeras Jornadas por la Liberación de la Mujer Manifesto

-Remove all discrimination against women that persisted in the legislation.

- Make using contraception and committing adultery disappear as crimes.

- Promulgation of a law regulating divorce.

- Right to salaried work without discrimination (to equal work equal salary and equal promotion).

- Training and promotion of women in order to ensure economic independence.

- Creation of nurseries in neighborhoods or in jobs to help working women.

- Sex education campaigns in schools and the creation of family planning centers.

-Distribution of family responsibilities.

-Change the traditional mentality and education. Equality in access to education. Coeducation at all levels of teaching and review of texts and school games.

-Disclaimer in advertisements that indicated women were being used as a mere decorative object or sexual being.

..

=== Third-wave feminism in the Francoist and transition period (1975 - 1982) ===
For many people in Spain, the period that marked the beginning transition of Spain to a democracy occurred on 20 December 1973 with the death of Luis Carrero Blanco as a result of an attack by ETA. The end of the transition period is generally considered 1982, with the elections that saw PSOE come to power.

Feminism in the immediate post-Franco period was not easy to classify, though there were several different broad types. One form was "feminismo reformista", which advocated for legal and social changes for women without challenging Spain's traditional gender roles. Another form was "feminismo socialista", also known as "feminismo ácrata", "radical" or "sexista". This form of feminism was tied around the specific class struggle of women, and believed that women must be involved in the political process in order to affect change. An example of this was the Partido Feminista. A third form of feminism was "feminismo de la igualdad" or "feminismo de la diferencia". Spanish feminism of the 1970s defined women beyond their reproductive capacity to be mothers. It said women deserved bodily control of their reproductive choices, and their own sexuality.

Third-wave feminism entered Spain in the 1970s. Like many other western countries, this movement defined feminism as a social, political and cultural movement. Spanish third-wave feminism was the result of high-profile quarrels among leftist women and increasingly involvement of male dominated political organizations. This new wave of feminism was both similar and notably dissimilar to their American counterparts of the same name by being more explicitly socialist and politically focused on class in their orientation. Third-wave Spanish feminism focused on the autonomy of women in their ability to define their own priorities and strategies. The major organization in the wave's early history was the Frente de Liberación de la Mujer, which was founded in 1976 in Madrid. Other third-wave feminist women founded Partido Feminist (PF) and Seminario Colectivo Feminista, an organization founded in 1976 as a result in a split inside PF.

One of the key successes for feminists in this period was they were able to challenge the overriding narrative that womanhood was defined around motherhood. They made gender identity based around shared female experiences, the ability to make choices, a social itinerary and constructing their own history separate from motherhood.

The end of the Francoist period saw a crisis in Spanish feminism akin to the type of crisis experienced by other Western European countries following the end of World War I which then led to a lull in feminist activities. From 1979 to 1982, many feminists became inactive with women feeling they had achieved many of their goals in the new Spanish constitution. Feminism would regain momentum again in 1983, when the Socialist government founded the Institute for Women with the goal of removing patriarchal structures in government and culture, while funding many women's groups and doing investigations into women's history in Spain.

In the period between 1974 and 1978, feminists protested for amnesty for women, including those convicted of abortion, contraception, adultery and prostitution related offenses who were in prison. These feminists were attacked by the police using tear gas and smoke bombs. Feminists also held protests in support of the decriminalization of adultery, equality in the workforce, the right to assembly, the ability to strike, and the suppression of images the movement felt were degrading to women.

Following the death of Franco, feminism saw a resurgence in the conservative city of Salamanca. Their struggle was visible in newspapers, radio and magazine, as they debated feminism, and its political intersections. Feminists in Salamanca in the period between 1975 and 1985 were joined in conversations about divorce, abortion and birth control by the Catholic Church.

Despite gay men being the more visible homosexuals in the Franco and transition period, women writers would be at the forefront of normalizing homosexuality in literature for the average Spanish reader in the final Franco years and first years of the transition. Women writers like Ester Tusquets were the first to break taboo subjects like female desire. Political feminism that saw lesbianism as a natural endpoint for women began to become a bigger theme in some feminist works of this period.

While the issue of pornography was of interest to feminists in the transition period, it was not center to their political activities as they had other goals they wanted to work on first before seriously visiting the topic. Most of the condemnations of pornography in this period consequently came from conservative women opposed to sex more generally and seeking to return to a more traditionally family centered period.

==== Third-wave feminist movements ====
feminismo socialista emerged from Marxist philosophies of the 1960s. It was based around the idea that emancipation for women does not emerge from political reforms or a fight for legal equality, but by fully incorporating women into the workforce and through socializing domestic tasks in the home. Women are viewed as a separate class of societal labor that need protections. Flora Tristan, Alejandra Kollontai and Clara Zetkin were some one of the key women in articulating the philosophy behind feminismo socialista. Zillah Eisenstein, Chantal Mouffe and Sheila Rowbotham are the three most important women in defining this movement in a Spanish context.

feminismo de la igualdad and feminismo de la diferencia are Spanish off-shoots of third-wave radical feminism that appeared during the 1970s.

feminismo de la igualdad involved a critical examination of how the world was structured around men, including sexual division of labor.

feminismo de la diferencia had a motto of "Being a Woman is beautiful." The approach is defined around sex differences, not inequality between the sexes. It proposed a form of feminism that was separate from leftist, liberal and Marxist ideologies and was uniquely feminine. Victoria Sendón de León explained this branch of feminism was, "The opposite of equality is not difference, but inequality, we have opposed equality to difference when in reality it is not possible to achieve true equality without maintaining the differences, otherwise it would be nothing more than a colonization by sack."

==== Primeras Jornadas of 1975 ====
Starting in 1975 in the immediate days after the death of Franco, Spanish feminism radically changed, with a "Primeras Jornadas por la liberación de la mujer" celebration held in Madrid in December. Built on an earlier movement with large amounts of support in Barcelona, these First Days would change the face of Spanish feminism. These early days created a period of united pluralist feminism, and saw the creation of a wide variety of feminist groups.

In the immediate post-Franco era, feminists were successful in decriminalizing adultery, divorce, abortion before three months, and some forms of birth control. Those wanting divorce wanted it to include civil divorces for religious marriages. In the immediate post-Franco era, feminists in Spain were united in their goal to eliminate the law that made adultery a criminal offense. Their efforts were joined by many anonymous women and some men. They found support in their goals from progressive political parties. There were arguments at the time over the way to be both a feminist and a lesbian. The lesbian political movement at the time largely concluded that lesbian sexuality "did not have to be soft or aggressive, nor follow any feminist or feminine pattern." Some radical feminists in the immediate transition period would choose lesbianism as a form of exerting control over their sexuality that had been repressed by the Franco regime. "Sexuality is not motherhood" (Spanish: Sexualidad no es maternidad) became a slogan of many feminists and feminists organizations by the end of 1975. Feminists of the period tried to amplify their message using the radio, television and the media. They also tried to get their allies to carry their message on these mediums. This had the effect of making feminists targets of the utlra-right, who threatened feminists, calling them at the night and sometimes threatening to kill them.

2,000 women marched in January 1976 towards the presidential headquarters at Paseo de la Castellana, 3 saying "Woman: fight for your liberation. Join up!" They were stopped near Goya by armed police carrying batons. The gray uniformed police made it impossible for most of the women to make it to the presidential headquarters. A Catalan Primeras Jornadas event was held in May 1976 at the University of Barcelona, with more than 4,000 women attending. Partido Feminista de España was founded in 1975 by Lidia Falcón, constituted in 1979 in Barcelona and registered in 1981. Asociación Universitaria para el Estudio de los Problemas de la Mujer (A.U.P.E.P.M.) was the first women's group to be founded in Salamanca. The mixed gender organization was created in the early 1970s, as an offshoot of a Universidad Complutense de Madrid created organization. It was legally recognized in 1976.

The issue of dual militancy raised problems for Primeras Jornadas por la Liberación de la Mujer. Some of the participants wanted to attend a general demonstration demanding the release of and amnesty for political prisoners at Madrid's Carabanchel prison. Other women wanted to protest in front of Madrid's Yeserías prison which houses women. After much discussion, the group decided not to suspend the Primeras Jornadas, and instead allow participants to choose either demonstration if they wanted to. This helped consolidate and unify the broader feminist movement.

==== 1976 Spanish political reform referendum ====
During 1975 and 1976, one of the major goals of Spain's leftist political organizations was to achieve political freedom and to get amnesty for political prisoners. They would get a partial amnesty by September 1976. Spanish feminism had to struggle to remain unified, and not be subsumed in the broader political struggles of the day. The nuns of the order Evangelical Crusades of Christ the King were created during the Spanish Civil War with the purpose of monitoring Republic prisoners. The nuns of the order Evangelical Crusades of Christ the King continued their work during the Franco regime by running the Trinitat Vella women's prison in Catalonia. Women were in the prison for a variety of mostly female specific crimes, including 30% who were there for having an abortion and 50% for violating the Social Danger Law. The nuns enacted a regime policy of reeducation with the intention of assisting "fallen women who wanted to recover their dignity."

Following the death of Franco, women and others in the neighborhood would meet outside the Trinitat Vella women's prison in Catalonia every Sunday at noon to protest the ongoing detention of prisoners and demand they be given amnesty.

The Plataforma de Organizaciones y Grupos de Mujeres de Madrid announced in a press release on 20 October 1976 that their movement was not ideologically united but that they fundamentally agreed on a few key points, including that discrimination against women needed to be combated in all social aspects, the need to raise awareness in Spanish society about the need to transform the concept of Spanish families to one beyond a male-female relationship, and to support a democracy that guaranteed the liberties of all citizens in a new Spanish state that would allow substantial changes in the everyday life of women.

Magda Oranich defined feminism in 1976 as, "Being a feminist with all the deep meaning that the term implies means fighting for a more just society, where all men and women have absolutely the same rights and obligations. Being a feminist in our country means fighting against unjust structures that are the that make possible the special oppression suffered by women, and against an entire ideological superstructure that has impregnated machismo and phallocratic schemes to the most recondite places of our society. " Feminists organizations largely did not support the 15 December 1976 Political Reform Referendum. In general, they did not believe the Francoists were capable of enacting reforms that would benefit women.

The magazine Vindicación Feminista as published between 1976 and 1979. Coming out after the death of Franco, it was the first militant feminist publication to be published in Spain since the 1930s. Male union members were frequently highly critical of Partido Feminista and their publication Vindicación Feminista, telling these women they should go home and wash the dishes. These male unionist did not believe women were a separate social class.

There was a march in Barcelona in November 1976 where 5,000 protested the law that made adultery illegal. The protest was in response to the case of María Ángeles Muñoz, where Ángeles Muñoz had been abandoned by her husband in 1970 with her daughter, moved in with another woman and was later sentenced to prison for committing adultery. Following this, Ángeles Muñoz was later accused by her husband Ramón Soto Gómez of adultery.

The first protest condemning violence against women was held in Barcelona in 1976. Women marched, chanting phrases like "Against rape, castration" (Spanish: Contra violación, castración), "We want to walk calmly" (Spanish: Queremos caminar tranquilas), "Let's make our night" (Spanish: Hagamos nuestra la noche), "Alone, drunk, I want to go home" (Spanish: Sola, borracha, quiero volver a casa) and "Enough of violations!" (Spanish: ¡Basta de violaciones!). At the time, rape was not treated as a serious institutional problem inside Spain, and rape victims had few rights.

==== Spanish general elections of 1977 ====
Ahead of the 15 June 1977 general elections, political and social conditions largely remained unchanged. Leftist parties did not necessarily accept demands of most feminists accept for certain issues like the legalization of conception. Many feminists involved in political groups abandoned specific goals in favor of broader political goals, resulting in a diluted form of feminism being adapted by major leftist parties.

The transition period saw Unión de Centro Democrático (UCD) come into power led in 1977 by Prime Minister Adolfo Suarez on a liberal platform espousing women's rights. Because his party lacked an absolute majority to govern, he was forced to form a coalition with other more right leaning parties. This resulted in a dilution of women's priorities and angered many women's rights advocates and feminists, serving to splinter these groups along ideological priority based grounds that saw one side view participation in the constitutional draft process as being part of emancipated citizenship while another faction saw it as oppressed women being forced to participate in their own repression. Radical feminists opposed to UCD felt vindicated in their doubts following the 1979 general elections, which saw 21 women or 6 percent of the 350 seats belonging to women, down from 22 in the previous congress. At the same time, UCD continued to be the largest political organization for women with the most representation of any party in Congress, with 11 women deputies and 4 women senators. In contrast, PSOE refused to address women's issues more broadly and to prioritize women's concerns. They did not move women's positions up their list, and consequently the number of female PSOE representatives fell in 1979 to 6 from the previous high of 11.

Women elected in 1977 included Juana Arce Molina (UCD Parliamentary Group), María Dolors Calvet (communist), María Belén Landáburu González (royal appointment), Mercedes Moll De Miguel (UCD), Elena María Moreno (UCD), María Dolores Pelayo Duque (UCD), María Teresa Revilla (UCD), Ana María Ruiz-Tagle Morales (PSOE), Esther Beatriz Tellado Alfonso (UCD), and Nona Inés Vilariño (UCD). These women faced a double fight in that they were politicians in the time of transition and they were women. At the time, many did not understand the importance of their historical role.

==== Spanish Constitution of 1978 ====
Feminists groups watched the process of creating a new Spanish constitution with concern. On 6 December 1978, a number of groups presented Cortes president Antonio Hernández Gil with a list of their concerns about it. Signatories included women who were members of UCD, PSOE, PC, MDM, ADM-PT and ORT-ULM. They wanted the constitution to commit the government to incorporating women into the workforce, that marriage should be based on equality of spouses, that marriages could be dissolved by mutual consent of either spouse, that every women should have the right to decide how many children she would have, and that women should have access to birth control. These women were opposed to Article 15, which said that "everyone has the right to life" (Spanish: todos tienen derecho a la vida) as they felt it could be interpreted as offering protection to fetuses. Their fears would be realized on 11 April 1985, when this constitutional wording was used to declare an abortion law illegal.

Feminists associations were legally allowed starting in 1978, a year before PCE began a legal political party. Poder y Libertad replaced Vindicación Feminista following the ratification of the new Spanish constitution in 1978. 1978 was the year that contraception became a driving issue among Spanish feminists. Their goal going into the year was to see contraception decriminalized by year end.

In May 1978, adultery was eliminated as a criminal offense in Spain's penal code. Definitions of abandonment were also changed, as they were not consistent for both sexes with women previously only being able to claim abandonment if her husband forced his wife to support his mistress while they were living in the same house. On 7 October 1978, the law was changed to decriminalize the sale of contraceptives, along with information on how to use them.

==== Spanish general elections of 1979 ====
In 1981, Soledad Becerril became a minister in the Spanish government. She was the first woman minister in Spain since the Second Spanish Republic. Becerril supported the concept of dual militancy among Spanish feminists, in that women could both be involved in political organizations while also being feminists. For feminists in 1979, the most important political issues were divorce and abortion.

Spanish feminism was unified on the need for the legalization of divorce. The movement believed that inability to access legal divorce led to social inequalities for women. They believed there was a need for divorce that did not find either party guild and that did not discriminate against women. The issue of divorce would play an intense part of Spanish feminist political life in 1979, 1980 and 1981. The Catholic Church was actively opposed to civil divorce in the mid and late 1970s. The 1979 general elections saw almost all parties campaign with some form of divorce as part of their platform.

The November 1979 XXXII Conferencia Episcopal said the Church did not want to interfere in the ability of legislators to do their job. Nonetheless, they advised that legislators considering legalization of divorce be allowed only in specific circumstances. This included that divorce was not a right, mutual consent not be allowed, and that divorce should only occur when there was no other remedy for the marriage. The Ministry of Justice asked the Catholic Church to stop meddling, and the Catholic Church had to accept that they would not have any involvement in civil marriages and civil divorces. Monsignor Jubany from Barcelona's final request in meeting with members of the Cortes was to make divorce expensive as a way of preventing it.

Minister of Justice Francisco Fernández successfully fought the inclusion of a hardness clause into the divorce legislation. This clause would have allowed for judges to prevent a divorce if the judge determined that allowing a divorce would cause exceptionally serious damage to the other spouse or any children in the marriage. The divorce law became official on 7 July 1981.

1979 was a pivotal year for abortion rights with the Bilbao Trial (Spanish: Juicio de Bilbao). The trial involved ten women and one man who were prosecuted for performing abortions. Prosecutors announced their intention to seek prison time of more than 100 years. With the original trial announced on 26 October 1979, it was not held until 1982 as a result of being suspended several times in the interim. The trial absolved nine of the women involved. A man who induced the abortions and a woman who performed them were found guilty. The ruling was appealed, with the appeal being suspended several times before being heard at the end of 1983. The results of the appeal resulted in four women being acquitted, and six women and the man were given prison sentences. In the end, those seven would eventually be pardoned by the state. A protest was held outside the Palau de la Generalitat in 1982 in support of the Bilbao eleven. By that point, they had been in prison for six years. At least one woman had been denounced by her ex-husband. In addition to prison times, prosecutors were seeking to strip the accused of their right to vote. At the Palau de la Generalitat protest in Barcelona, the police violently acted protesters. Police give several women head wounds. An amnesty petition for the Bilbao 11 was signed by over 1,300 women, including politicians, singers, artists and journalists who all affirmed that they abortions too. All but the person who performed the abortions were given amnesty in 1982. In 1981, the Comisión Pro Derecho al aborto de Madrid produced a 39-page document detailing statistical information about abortion in Spain based on data from the Centro de Mujeres de Vallecas. Its data found that of the 820 women who had abortions, 68% were married, 3% were widowed and 29% were single. Of the 600 women were data was available, they found that 86.9% had their abortion before 12 weeks, that 72% had gone abroad despite limited financial resources to secure an abortion, and that 45.69% had an abortion for economic reasons. During the mid-1970s, the Catholic Church preached that no physical barrier should be present during sex, and that even post-coital washes were problematic as they interfered with the primary goal of sex being conception. The Catholic Church taught the only acceptable reproductive control methods were abstinence and the rhythm method. The Church tried to interfere in any efforts to change this.

In 1979 in Salamanca, leftist men continued to oppose the presence of women in their movement, claiming they needed to return to their homes.

==== Spanish general elections of 1982 ====
The 1982 Spanish general elections were a landslide victory of PSOE, and see 18 of the 22 women in Congress be party members. Despite this, women affiliated with PSOE continued to deal with issues of dual militancy, where they battled both for their political goals and feminist ideology that sometimes could be at odds with each other.

Alianza Popular became the primary opposition party following these elections, capturing around 25% of the overall vote. More than half their voters were women. PNV and Convergència i Unió (CiU) were both considered moderate regional parties. Women voters in general favored centrist parties during the 1982 elections, like PNV, CiU and Centro Democrático y Social (CDS). Women disavowed more the extremist elements like ETA, Herri Batasuna (HB), Catalan nationalists ERC, and Galician radicals. This pattern repeated itself in the 1986 elections.

In the 1980s, feminists were the only major group demanding the government address women's needs to have access to abortion services. Abortion was made legal by Congress in 1983, but did not enter into legal effect until 1985 as Coalición Popular (now Partido Popular) challenged the constitutionality of the law. The decriminalization of abortion was allowed for three reasons. The first was that it was ethical in the case of rape. The second was it could be a necessary to save the life of the mother. The third reason was that eugenic, allowing abortion in case of fetal malformation. Other countries were legalizing abortion at the same time. Portugal's Parliament made abortion legal in November 1982. Italy made abortion legal in May 1981 as a result of a referendum.

== See also ==
- Fourth-wave feminism in Spain
