= Basic Books =

American book publisher

- Parent company: Hachette Book Group
- Founded: 1950
- Founder: Arthur Rosenthal
- Country of origin: United States
- Headquarters location: New York City
- Official website: basicbooks.com

Basic Books is a book publisher founded in 1950 and located in New York City, now an imprint of Hachette Book Group. It publishes books in the fields of psychology, philosophy, economics, science, politics, sociology, current affairs, and history.

== History ==
Basic Books originated as a small Greenwich Village-based book club marketed to psychoanalysts. Arthur Rosenthal took over the book club in 1950, and under his ownership it soon began producing original books, mostly in the behavioral sciences. Early successes included Ernest Jones's The Life and Work of Sigmund Freud, as well as works by Claude Lévi-Strauss, Jean Piaget and Erik Erikson. The "godfather of neoconservatism", Irving Kristol, joined Basic Books in 1960, and helped Basic to expand into the social sciences. Harper & Row purchased the company in 1969.

In 1997, HarperCollins announced that it would merge Basic Books into its trade publishing program, effectively closing the imprint and ending its publishing of serious academic books. That same year, Basic was purchased by the newly created Perseus Books Group. Perseus's publishing business was acquired by Hachette Book Group in 2016. In 2018, Seal Press became an imprint of Basic.

== Authors ==
Basic's list of authors includes:

- Stephon Alexander
- Robert Alter
- Edward E. Baptist
- H.W. Brands
- Zbigniew Brzezinski
- Iris Chang
- Stephanie Coontz
- Richard Dawkins
- Andrea Dworkin
- Michael Eric Dyson
- Niall Ferguson
- Richard Feynman
- Richard Florida
- Martin Ford
- Howard Gardner
- Jonathan Haidt
- Victor Davis Hanson
- Yoram Hazony
- Judith L. Herman
- Christopher Hitchens
- Douglas Hofstadter
- Leszek Kolakowski
- Kevin M. Kruse
- Lawrence Lessig
- Robert Nozick
- Steven Pinker
- Samantha Power
- Eugene Rogan
- Lee Smolin
- Jacob Soll
- Jason Sokol
- Timothy Snyder
- Tamler Sommers
- Thomas Sowell
- Ian Stewart
- Beverly Daniel Tatum
- James Traub
- Sherry Turkle
- Eric Topol
- Michael Walzer
- Elizabeth Warren
- George Weigel
- Steven Weinberg
- Frank Wilczek
- Bee Wilson
- Richard Wrangham
- Irvin D. Yalom
