= Gender feminism =

Gender feminism may refer to:

- A term used by Christina Hoff Sommers in the 1994 book Who Stole Feminism?
- A form of difference feminism
- Care-focused feminism
