= Masjid al-Rabia =

Mosque in Chicago, Illinois, United States

Religion
- Affiliation: Islam
- Ownership: Mahdia Lynn and Zaynab Shahar

Location
- Location: Chicago
- State: Illinois
- Country: USA
- Interactive map of Masjid al-Rabia

Architecture
- Established: December 2017
- Delisted: 2024

Masjid al-Rabia was an LGBT-affirming and woman-centered mosque in Chicago.

The organizers were Mahdia Lynn and Zaynab Shahar.

The mosque offered its first Friday prayer the first week of December 2017.

Masjid al-Rabia had mixed-gender prayers and encouraged women to lead them. The mosque sought to provide all Muslims with a place to pray.

A representative of the Prayer Center, a Muslim organization in nearby Orland Park, Illinois, said the activities of Masjid al-Rabia are contrary to Muslim faith. Masjid al-Rabia announced on its Instagram page that it would be closing, holding its final virtual event on February 10, 2024. Co-founder Mahdia Lynn died in September 2024.
