= Gynocentrism =

Dominant or exclusive focus on women in theory or practice

Gynocentrism is a dominant or exclusive focus on women in theory or practice. The opposite practice, placing the masculine point of view at the centre, is androcentrism.

Gynocentrism has been described as a pervasive form of sexism. It has also been described as a movement centered on, emphasizing, or dominated by females or feminine interests.

== Etymology ==
The term gynocentrism is derived from Ancient Greek, γυνή and κέντρον. Γυνή can be translated as woman or female, but also as wife. In Ancient Greek compounds with γυνή, the stem γυναικ- is normally used. This stem can be spotted in the genitive case γυναικός, and in the older form of the nominative case γύναιξ. In Ancient Greek, no compounds are known to exist with γυνή that start with γυνο- or γυνω-.

The Ancient Greek word κέντρον can be translated as sharp point, sting (of bees and wasps), point of a spear and stationary point of a pair of compasses, with the meaning centre of a circle related to the latter. The meaning centre/middle point (of a circle) is preserved in the Latin word centrum, a loanword from Ancient Greek. The English word centre is derived from the Latin centrum. The word κέντρον is derived from the verb κεντεῖν, meaning to sting (of bees), to prick, to goad, and to spur. When trying to explain etymologically the term gynocentrism, it is important to consider the Ancient Greek κέντρον, with the signification middle point/centre, and not the more obvious Ancient Greek word κεντρισμός (mirroring -centrism).

== History ==
The term gynocentrism has been in use since at least 1897 when it appeared in The Open Court stating that Continental Europeans view Americans "as suffering rather from gynocentrism than anthropocentrism." In 1914, author George A. Birmingham found American social life to be "gynocentric"; it was "arranged with a view to the convenience and delight of women."

Beginning with second-wave feminism in the 1970s, the term gynocentrism has been used to describe difference feminism, which displayed a shift towards understanding and accepting gender differences, in contrast to equality feminism.

== In contemporary society ==
The Men Going Their Own Way (MGTOW) community describes themselves as a backlash against the "misandry of gynocentrism". According to University of Massachusetts philosopher Christa Hodapp, in modern men's movements, gynocentrism is described as a continuation of the courtly love conventions of medieval times, wherein women were valued as a quasi-aristocratic class, and males were seen as a lower serving class. This viewpoint describes feminism as the perpetuation of oppressive medieval conventions such as devotional chivalry and romanticized relationships, rather than as a movement towards liberation.

J. Lasky has characterized gynocentrism as a potential response to androcentrism, and that gynocentrism has been used as an argument by anti-feminists, who believe that gynocentrism is anti-male.

In a 2019 study of Trinidad society published in the Justice Policy Journal, researchers concluded that "gynocentrism pervades all aspects of the criminal justice system."

== Criticism ==
Feminist writer Lynda Burns alleges that gynocentrism is a magnification of celebration of women's positive differences—of women's history, myths, arts and music—as opposed to an assimilationist model privileging similarity to men.

However observed in practice, the preeminence of women associated with gynocentric narratives is often seen as absolute: interpersonally, culturally, historically, politically, or in broader social contexts such as popular entertainment. As such, it can shade into what Rosalind Coward called "womanism... a sort of popularized version of feminism which acclaims everything women do and disparages men".

According to Margrit Eichler gynocentrism can be seen as sexist bias in social science research.

== See also ==
- Androcentrism
- Gynocriticism
- Herstory
- Matriarchy
- Anthropocentrism
