= Victoria Sendón de León =

Spanish philosopher, feminist and writer (born 1942)

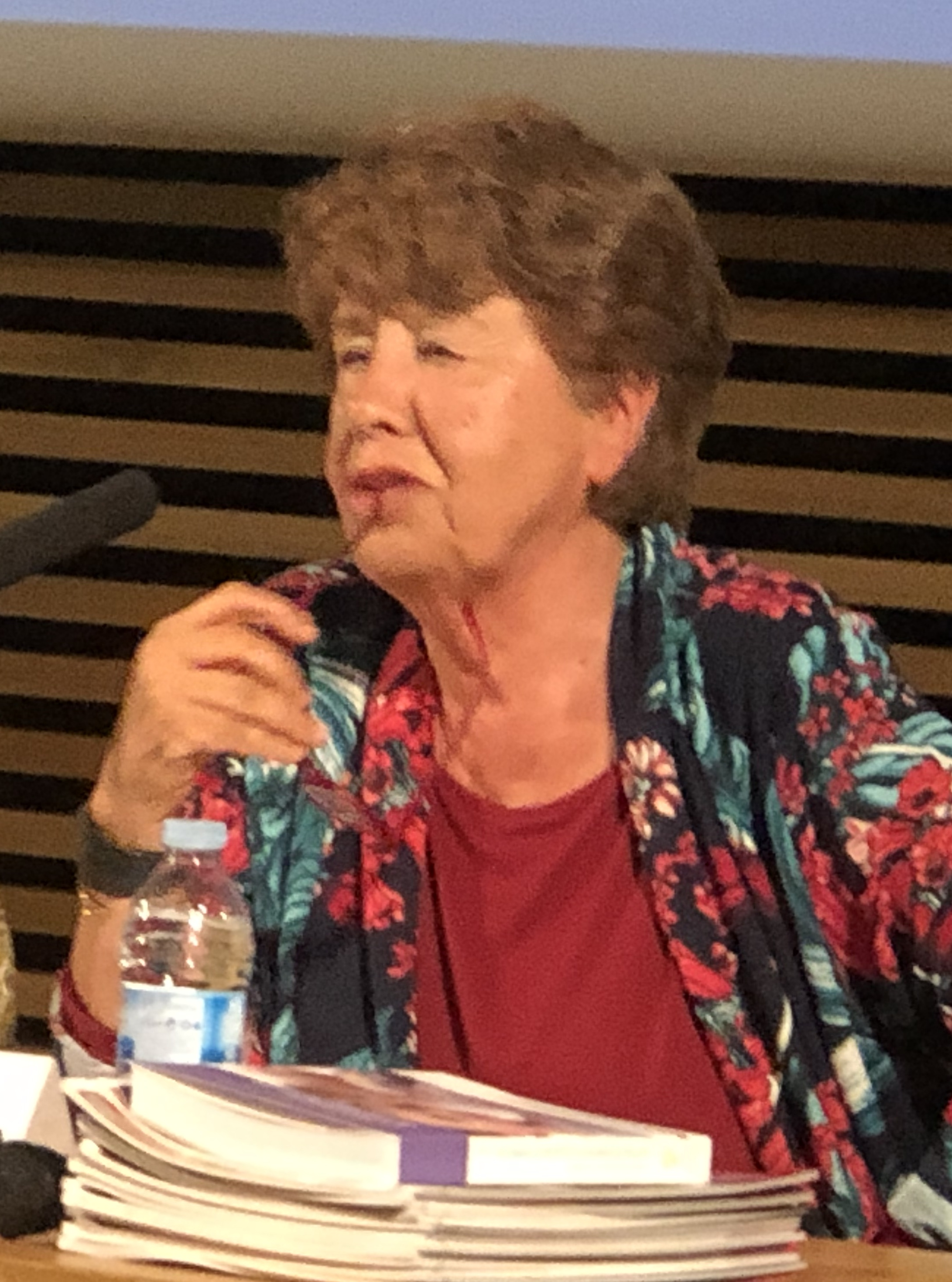
Victoria Sendón de León

Victoria Sendón de León (born 1942) is a Spanish philosopher, feminist and writer.

A difference feminist, Sendón de León has criticized equality feminism’s emphasis on rationality and ideals of equality:

I want difference. I am profoundly repulsed by equality ... I am not convinced by this fallacy that equality is required for liberty. Liberty does not grow in rotten, swampy waters

== Works ==
- Sobre diosas, amazonas y vestales: Utopías para un feminismo radical [On goddesses, Amazons and vestals: Utopias for a radical feminism], 1981
- La España herética, 1986
- Más allá de Itaca: sobre complicidades y conjuras, 1988
- Feminismo holístico: de la realidad a lo real, 1994
- Marcar las diferencias: discursos feministas ante un nuevo siglo, 2002
- Mujeres en la era global : contra un patriarcado neoliberal, 2003
- Matria: el horizonte de lo posible, 2006
