= Herstory =

Term for women emphasized history

Herstory is a term for history written from a feminist perspective and emphasizing the role of women, or told from a woman's point of view. It originated as an alteration of the word "history", as part of a feminist critique of conventional historiography, which in their opinion is traditionally written as "his story", i.e., from the male point of view. The term is a neologism and a deliberate play on words; the word "history"—via Latin historia from the Ancient Greek word ἱστορία, a noun meaning 'knowledge obtained by inquiry'—is etymologically unrelated to the possessive pronoun his.

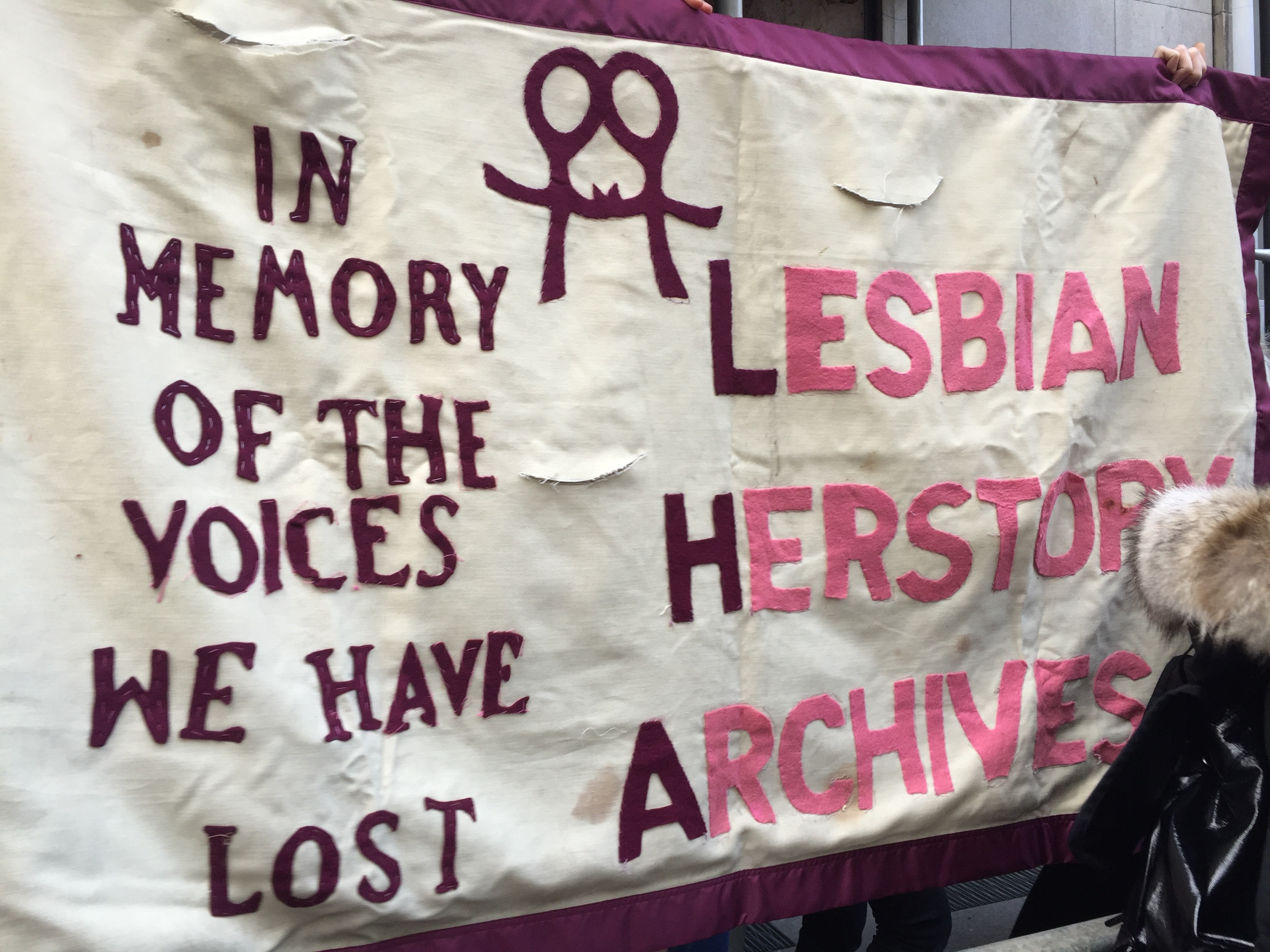
Lesbian Herstory Archives banner

== Usage ==
Literature scholar Fritz Fleischmann marks "the first documented instance of the word-play with His-Story/Her-Story" as the title page of the 1817 novel Keep Cool by early feminist John Neal. The Oxford English Dictionary credits Dr. F.H.K. Green with first using the term "herstory" in print.

During the 1970s and 1980s, second-wave feminists saw the study of history as a male-dominated intellectual enterprise and presented "herstory" as a means of compensation. The term, intended to be both serious and comic, became a rallying cry used on T-shirts and buttons as well as in academia. For example, the linguist and author Suzette Haden Elgin defined dedideheril in her constructed language Láadan as 'herstory', specifying it as "the stories women tell of their past; usually based on interpersonal relationships: births; deaths; relocations; marriages; etc.", and contrasted it with dedideherilid, 'his-story', being "the stories men tell of their past; usually based on wars; conquests; major disasters; the way the past is told in most late 20th century history books".

In 2017, Hridith Sudev, an inventor, environmentalist and social activist associated with various youth movements, launched 'The Herstory Movement,' an online platform to "celebrate lesser known great persons; female, queer or otherwise marginalized, who helped shape the modern World History." It is intended as an academic platform to feature stories of female historic persons and thus help facilitate more widespread knowledge about 'Great Women' History.

Non-profit organizations Global G.L.O.W and LitWorld created a joint initiative called the "HerStory Campaign". This campaign works with 25 other countries to share girl's lives and stories. They encourage others to join the campaign and to "raise our voices on behalf of all world's girls".

The herstory movement has spawned women-centered presses, such as Virago Press in 1973, which publishes fiction and non-fiction by noted women authors like Janet Frame and Sarah Dunant.

This movement has led to an increase in activity in other female-centric disciplines such as femistry and galgebra.

== Criticism ==
Christina Hoff Sommers has been a vocal critic of the concept of herstory, and presented her argument against the movement in her 1994 book Who Stole Feminism? Sommers defined herstory as an attempt to infuse education with ideology at the expense of knowledge. The "gender feminists", as she called them, were the group of feminists responsible for the movement, which she felt amounted to negationism. She regarded most attempts to make historical studies more female-inclusive as being artificial in nature and an impediment to progress.

Professor and author Devoney Looser has criticized the concept of herstory for overlooking the contributions that some women made as historians before the twentieth century. Author Richard Dawkins also described his criticism in The God Delusion, arguing that "the word history has not been influenced by the male pronoun". Critics also highlight that herstory, while aiming to prioritize women’s narratives, sometimes excludes non-Western perspectives, pointing out the importance of reconstructing feminist genealogies from a southern perspective, advocating for inclusivity in representing subaltern women’s histories and experiences.

== See also ==
- Feminist history
- Gender-neutral language
- History of feminism
- Radical feminism
- Women's history
- Womyn
