= Equity feminism =

Form of liberal feminism

Equity feminism is a form of liberal feminism that advocates the state's equal treatment of women and men without challenging inequalities perpetuated by employers, educational and religious institutions, and other elements of society. The concept has been discussed since the 1980s. Equity feminism has been defined and classified as a kind of classically liberal or libertarian feminism, in contrast with social feminism, difference feminism, gender feminism, and equality feminism.

== Overview ==
The Stanford Encyclopedia of Philosophy refers to Wendy McElroy, Joan Kennedy Taylor, Cathy Young, Rita Simon, Katie Roiphe, Diana Furchtgott-Roth, Christine Stolba, and Christina Hoff Sommers as equity feminists. Camille Paglia also describes herself as an equity feminist. Christina Sommers, in particular, explored the topic of equity feminism in her book Who Stole Feminism? In this text, Sommers summarizes how the aim of equity feminism is to attain economic, educational, and political equality of opportunity. Sommers claims that feminists are separated between two categories: equity feminists and gender feminists. She states that the difference between the two is that gender feminists focus on changing societal norms based on gender, while equity feminists focus more on achieving fairness in both genders.

Steven Pinker, an evolutionary and cognitive psychologist, linguist, and popular science author, identifies himself as an equity feminist, which he defines as "a moral doctrine about equal treatment that makes no commitments regarding open empirical issues in psychology or biology".

Distinctions have been made between conservative and radical forms of equity feminism. Many young conservative women have accepted equity feminism.

== Equity in the workplace ==
"4 Real Ways to Embrace Equity for Women in the Workplace" states that companies should accommodate their employees by providing the tools necessary for each employee to create an environment with equal opportunities. Equity feminism is all about treating men and women equally because they are created equally and should be treated as so. Multiverse enlists examples on how employer's can make a change in their hiring process as it tends to be bias. They state jobs hiring should focus on candidate's skills rather than the individual's name or background, include diversified language in their job listings, and pay woman the money they should be getting. Women can perform men's jobs just as well or even better than men and vice versa. The difference in how women are treated differently from men has a correlation on why companies will not consider women for higher-paying positions. Equity in the workplace can increase women's roles in higher positions but as long as their rights are being ignored and pushed away there will continue to be this unjust way of life for women. Equity feminist also push for equally shared responsibilities within households to again lessen the burden on women and push for that equity towards women.

== Theorists ==
Anne-Marie Kinahan claims that most American women look to a kind of feminism whose main goal is equity. Louis Schubert et al. claims "principles of equity feminism remain in the vision of the vast majority of women in the United States".

== United States ==
A button of what the ERA stood for as it tried to pass the House of Representatives in 1972.

In the United States, Alice Paul and Crystal Eastman, two women in the National Woman's Party, were involved in drafting the Equal Rights Amendment, with the goal of achieving "constitutional protections from discrimination" for all women.

The Equal Rights Amendment was proposed originally in 1923 by the National Woman's Party. The amendment was first proposed in Seneca Falls and former suffragist Agnes Morey presided at this event alongside Alice Paul. That year it was introduced in congress before being approved by the U.S. House of Representatives in March 1972 that would give both women and men the constitutional right to equity.

Equity in feminism is a branch of liberal feminism that creates a political stance assuring women's rights within or under the law. The battle for equity becomes political as many argue women and other groups who are considered oppressed are denied the same opportunities of cis-gender white males. Since the rejection of the ERA in 1972, the fight for equity has continued to grow in America and pushed for new laws that would protect women as it would have. Equity in feminism is important because it notes that women deserve the same rights. If there is no political push for a feminist equitable society, it would create a statement that women are lesser than men and don't deserve the same treatment regardless of education or social class.

The Equal Rights Amendment guarantees equal rights for all American citizens. This would assure to dispute any distinctions between sexes.

== Europe ==
In many respects, Europe has a more progressive stance than the United States when it comes to feminist and gender equity support. Organizations in Europe were made to promote not only equality and equity, but they also aimed to promote diversity while being an ally for women across the continent. Compared to the European Union, the lack of publicly identified feminists in the Americas poses some political challenges for the movement. Integrating feminists' methods into institutions is how European countries have been able to advance the interests of equity and feminism.

== See also ==
- First-wave feminism
- Liberal feminism
- Libertarian feminism
- Equality feminism
- Liberal Women (Germany)
