= Katharine A. Morey =

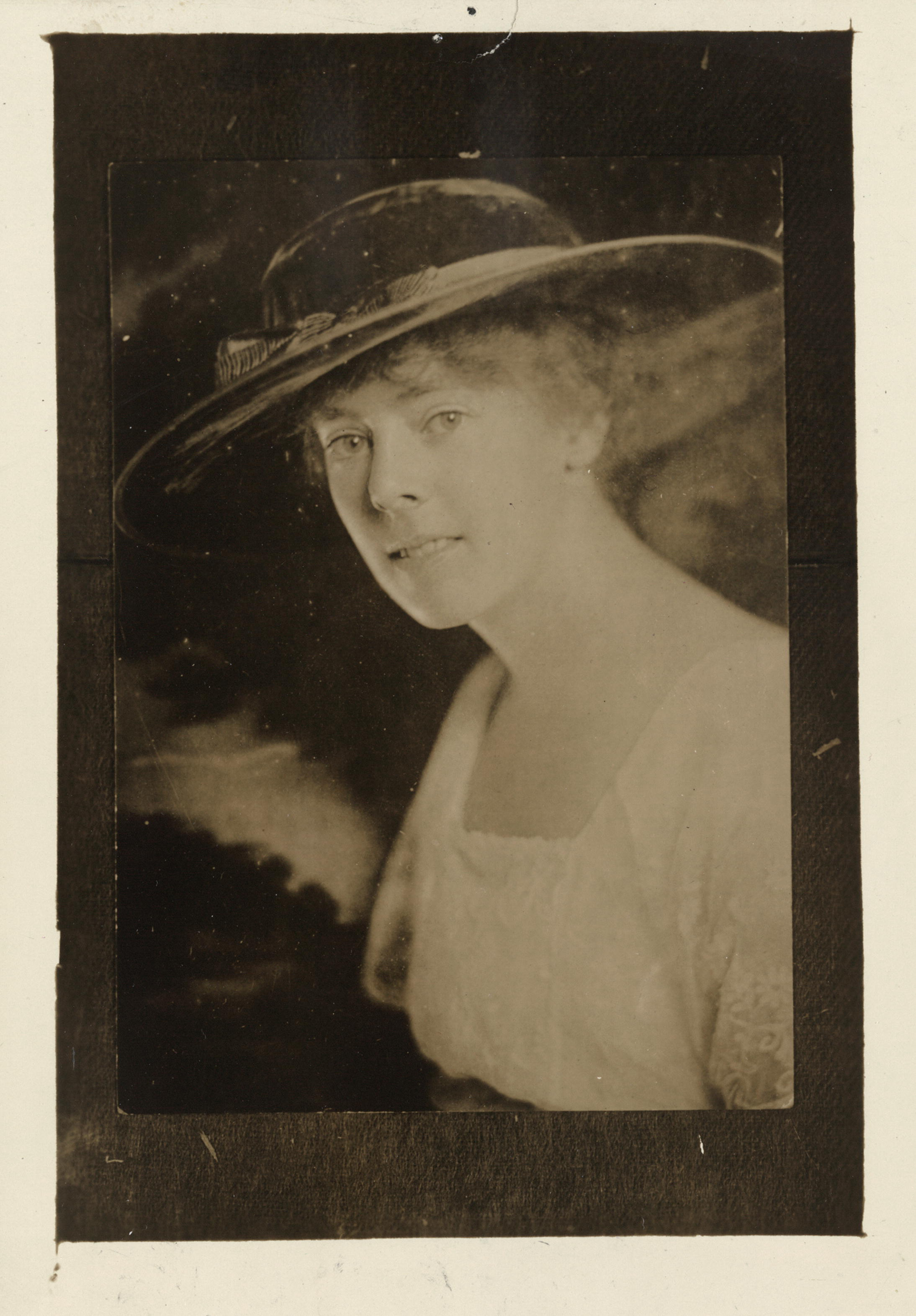
- Katharine A Morey [ca. 1915]
- Born: July 06, 1889; Lexington, Massachusetts, U.S.
- Died: May 21, 1941?
- Known for: Suffragist
- Spouse(s): Herbert N. Pinkham, Jr. (December 25, 1888–May 11, 1944)
- Mother: Suffragist Agnes Morey

Katharine A. Morey was an American suffragist, Silent Sentinel, officer of the Massachusetts State Branch of the National Woman's Party, and a member of the NWP Advisory Council. She and Lucy Burns were the first two American women to be arrested in front of the White House for the cause of women's suffrage.

In 1917, Morey joined with other National Women's Party picketers protesting outside the White House, in Washington, D.C. The picketers were known as "Silent Sentinels." The protests were organized to pressure U.S. President Woodrow Wilson to use his influence to move the 19th Amendment forward in Congress. Over the course of several months, picketers endured inclement weather, and attacks by mobs.

On June 22, Morey and fellow suffragist Lucy Burns were picketing Pennsylvania Avenue, when they were surrounded by police who demanded they turn over their sign, which read, "‘We shall fight for the things we have always carried nearest our hearts – for democracy, for the right of those who submit to authority to have a voice in their Government.’ President Wilson's War Message, April 2, 1917." The two women refused to relinquish their pickets, knowing they would be arrested. Morey and Burns were sentenced for blocking traffic. Morey served three days in jail. Later that year, after picketing the White House on Nov. 10, 1917, she was sentenced to 30 days at District Jail and Occoquan Workhouse.

In February 1919, she was arrested in Boston, Massachusetts, after protesting against a parade held in honor of President Woodrow Wilson's visit at the Massachusetts State House. She was sentenced to and served eight days at the Charles St. Jail.

Morey was also known for speaking at the "Suffrage Special" speaking tour of 1916.

== Personal life ==
Morey's mother, Agnes Morey, was also a suffragist activist.
