= Fred Sommers =

American philosopher (1923–2014)

- Born: Frederic Tamler Sommers; January 1, 1923; New York City, U.S.
- Died: October 2, 2014 (aged 91)
- Other name: Fred Sommers
- Education: Columbia University (BA, PhD)
- Spouse: Christina Hoff Sommers

Frederic Tamler Sommers (January 1, 1923 – October 2, 2014), better known as Fred Sommers, was an American philosopher who, after an initial focus on ontology generally, turned his attention specifically to a revival of classical logic. He is the father of the philosopher Tamler Sommers.

== Birth and education ==
Sommers was born in New York City on January 1, 1923. His family was Jewish and he studied under Rabbi Joseph Soloveitchik in the 1950s. He received his BA and PhD in philosophy at Columbia University, his dissertation being entitled An Empiricist Ontology: A Study in the Metaphysics of Alfred North Whitehead.

== Career ==
Sommers began his academic career at Columbia University, where he was assistant professor of philosophy from 1955 to 1963. He was invited to Brandeis University in 1964 as an associate professor of philosophy and was promoted to full professor in 1966. From 1965 until his retirement, he held the Harry Austryn Wolfson Chair of Philosophy; from 1993 until his death he was professor emeritus of Philosophy at Brandeis. He died aged 91 in 2014.

== Bibliography ==
- An Empiricist Ontology. A Study in the Metaphysics of Alfred North Whitehead, Columbia University, 1955 (unpublished Ph.D. thesis)
- The Logic of Natural Language, Oxford University Press, 1984. ISBN 978-0198247401
- An Invitation to Formal Reasoning, with George Englebretsen and Harry A. Wolfson. Ashgate, 2000. ISBN 978-0754613664
- Vice and Virtue in Everyday Life: Introductory Readings in Ethics, with Christina Hoff Sommers. Harcourt Brace, 1989. 9th edition: ISBN 978-1111837549
