= David A. Pizarro =

American psychologist

- Occupations: Psychologist, podcaster

Academic background
- Education: Pacific Union College (B.S.); Yale University (Ph.D.)
- Website: www.peezer.net

David A. Pizarro is an American psychologist and podcaster. He is a Professor of Psychology at Cornell University. His research focuses on the psychological underpinnings of human morality, as well as on the influence of emotions on decision-making, particularly on the emotion of disgust.

Pizarro is a Fellow of the Association for Psychological Science.

== Early life and education ==
Pizarro graduated with a Bachelor's degree from Pacific Union College in 1997 and received his Ph.D. in social psychology from Yale University in 2002 (under the supervision of Peter Salovey and Paul Bloom).

== Career ==
After receiving his PhD, Pizarro became a post-doctoral fellow at the University of California, Irvine. Since 2006, Pizarro has been a professor in the department of psychology at Cornell University.

Pizarro's research is focused on the nature of human morality—especially on how humans arrive at moral judgments about people and actions (such as judgments of character, responsibility, blame, and praise), and in how emotions (especially disgust) influence moral judgments. In his 2012 TED talk, The Strange Politics of Disgust, he provided an overview of his work linking individual differences in the degree to which people are easily disgusted to differences in political orientation.

Pizarro also co-hosts the podcast Very Bad Wizards along with the philosopher Tamler Sommers, from the University of Houston.

== Awards and honors ==
Pizarro was the Nannerl Keohane Distinguished Visiting Professor at University of North Carolina at Chapel Hill and Duke University in 2014. He was the recipient of the Stephen and Margery Russell Distinguished Teaching Award from Cornell University in 2021. He is a Fellow of the Association for Psychological Science.

== Bibliography ==
- Pizarro, D. A.; Bloom, P. (2003). "The intelligence of the moral intuitions: A comment on Haidt (2001)". Psychological Review. 110 (1): 193–196. doi:10.1037/0033-295X.110.1.193. PMID 12529062.
- Fernandez-Berrocal, P.; Alcaide, R.; Extremera, N.; Pizarro, D. (2006). "The role of emotional intelligence in anxiety and depression among adolescents". Individual Differences Research. 4 (1).
- Inbar, Y.; Pizarro, D. A.; Bloom, P. (2009). "Conservatives are more easily disgusted than liberals". Cognition and Emotion. 23 (4): 714–725. doi:10.1080/02699930802110007. S2CID 7411404.
- Inbar, Y.; Pizarro, D. A.; Knobe, J.; Bloom, P (2009). "Disgust sensitivity predicts intuitive disapproval of gays". Emotion. 9 (3): 435–439. doi:10.1037/a0015960. PMID 19485621.
- Bartels, D. M.; Pizarro, D. A. (2011). "The mismeasure of morals: Antisocial personality traits predict utilitarian responses to moral dilemmas". Cognition. 121 (1): 154–161. doi:10.1016/j.cognition.2011.05.010. PMID 21757191. S2CID 6942897.
