= Jason Sokol =

American historian

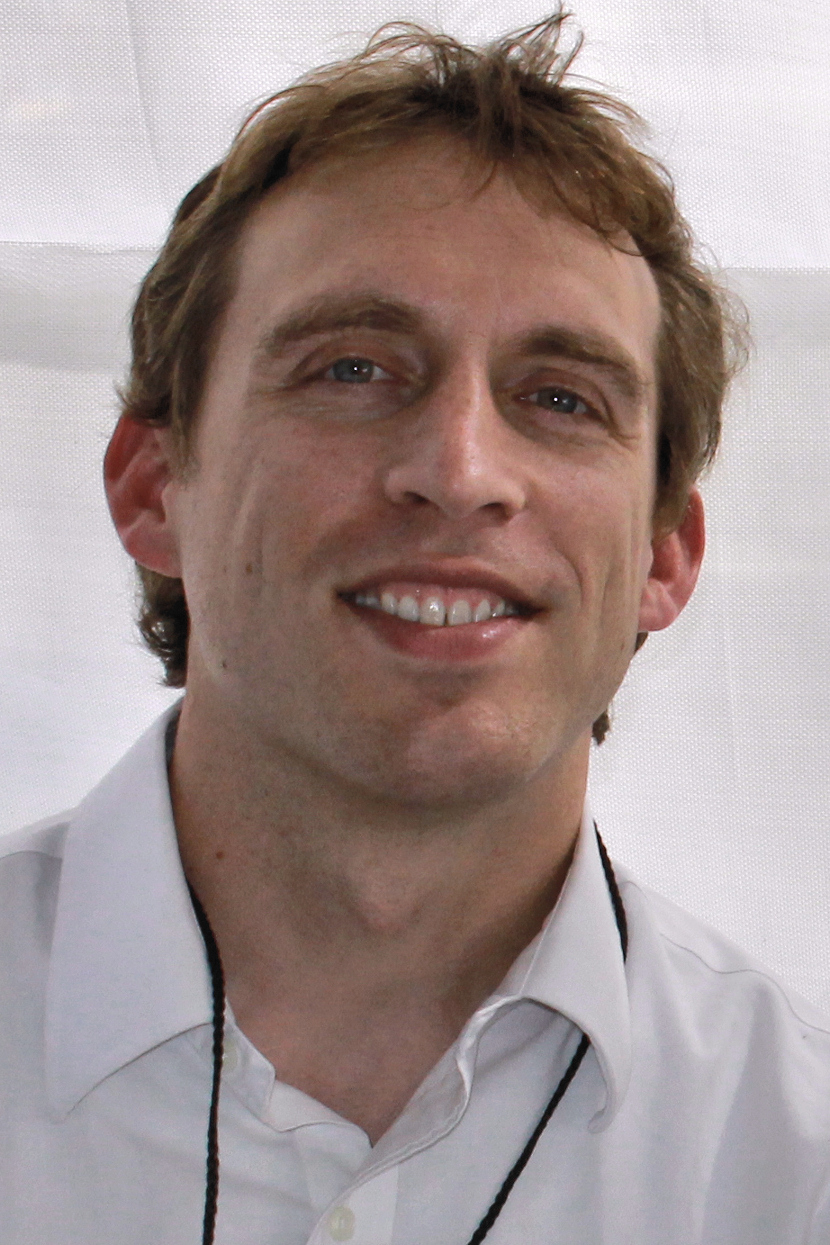
- Sokol at the 2015 Texas Book Festival
- Born: 1977 (age 48–49); Massachusetts
- Occupation: Historian
- Website: www.jasonsokol.com

Jason Sokol (born 1977) is an American historian and an associate professor at the University of New Hampshire.

Sokol is the author of three books on the history of the civil rights movement.
