= Christina Hoff Sommers =

American author and philosopher (born 1950)

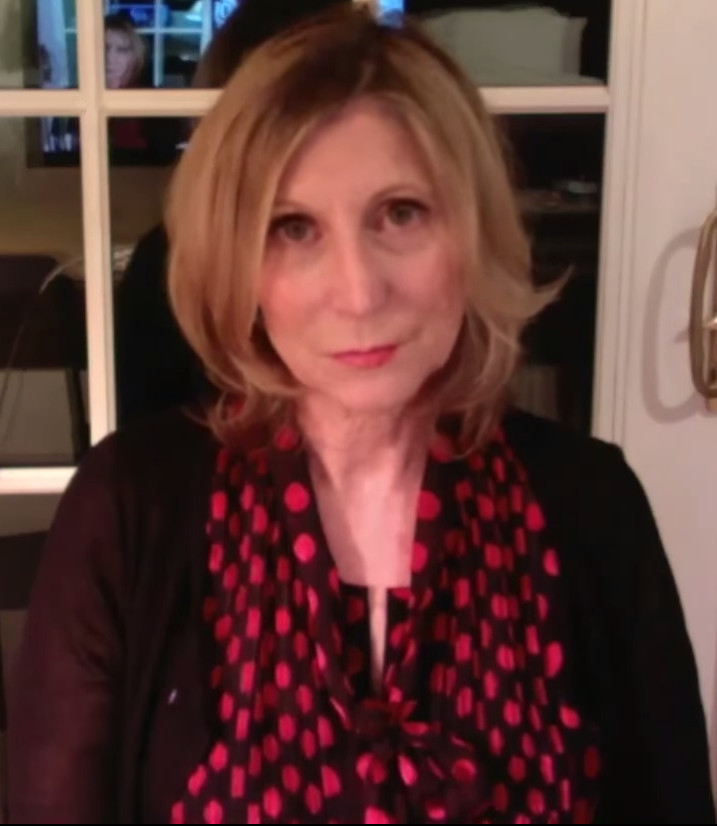
- Born: Christina Marie Hoff; September 28, 1950 (age 76); Sonoma County, California, U.S.
- Education: New York University (BA); Brandeis University (MA, PhD)
- Occupations: Author, philosopher, university professor, scholar at the American Enterprise Institute
- Spouse: Frederic Tamler Sommers (d. 2014)
- Writing career
- Notable works: Who Stole Feminism?, The War Against Boys, Vice and Virtue in Everyday Life
- Website: Official website

Christina Marie Hoff Sommers (born September 28, 1950) is an American author and philosopher. Specializing in ethics, she is a resident scholar at the American Enterprise Institute. Sommers is known for her critique of contemporary feminism. Her work includes the books Who Stole Feminism? (1994) and The War Against Boys (2000). She also hosts a video blog called The Factual Feminist.

Sommers' positions and writing have been characterized by the Stanford Encyclopedia of Philosophy as "equity feminism", a classical-liberal or libertarian feminist perspective holding that the main political role of feminism is to ensure that the right against coercive interference is not infringed. Sommers has contrasted equity feminism with what she terms victim feminism and gender feminism. Several writers have described Sommers' positions as anti-feminist.

== Early life and education ==
Sommers was born in 1950 to Kenneth and Dolores Hoff, and was raised in Southern California. Her parents named her after the English poet Christina Rossetti. She has said that her mother was Jewish, but that she was not raised religious. She attended the University of Paris, earned a B.A. degree at New York University in 1971, and earned a Ph.D. degree in philosophy from Brandeis University in 1979.

== Career ==
=== Ideas and views ===
Sommers has called herself an equity feminist, equality feminist, and liberal feminist. The Stanford Encyclopedia of Philosophy categorizes equity feminism as libertarian or classically liberal.

Several authors have described Sommers' positions as antifeminist. The feminist philosopher Alison Jaggar wrote in 2006 that, in rejecting the theoretical distinction between sex as a set of physiological traits and gender as a set of social identities, "Sommers rejected one of the distinctive conceptual innovations of second wave Western feminism," arguing that as the concept of gender is allegedly relied on by "virtually all" modern feminists, "the conclusion that Sommers is an anti-feminist instead of a feminist is difficult to avoid". Sommers has denied that she is anti-feminist.

Sommers has criticized women's studies as being dominated by man-hating feminists with an interest in portraying women as victims. According to The Nation, Sommers would tell her students that "statistically challenged" feminists in women's studies departments engage in "bad scholarship to advance their liberal agenda".

Sommers has denied the existence of the gender pay gap.

=== Early work ===
From 1978 to 1980, Sommers was an instructor at the University of Massachusetts at Boston. In 1980, she became an assistant professor of philosophy at Clark University and was promoted to associate professor in 1986. Sommers remained at Clark until 1997, when she became the W.H. Brady fellow at the American Enterprise Institute. During the mid-1980s, Sommers edited two philosophy textbooks on the subject of ethics: Vice & Virtue in Everyday Life: Introductory Readings in Ethics (1984) and Right and Wrong: Basic Readings in Ethics (1986). Reviewing Vice and Virtue for Teaching Philosophy in 1990, Nicholas Dixon wrote that the book was "extremely well edited" and "particularly strong on the motivation for studying virtue and ethics in the first place, and on theoretical discussions of virtue and vice in general."

Beginning in the late 1980s, Sommers published a series of articles in which she strongly criticized feminist philosophers and American feminism in general. According to philosopher Marilyn Friedman, Sommers blamed feminists for contributing to rising divorce rates and the breakdown of the traditional family, and rejected feminist critiques of traditional forms of marriage, family, and femininity. In a 1988 Public Affairs Quarterly article titled "Should the Academy Support Academic Feminism?", Sommers wrote that "the intellectual and moral credentials of academic feminism badly want scrutiny" and asserted that "the tactics used by academic feminists have all been employed at one time or another to further other forms of academic imperialism." In articles titled "The Feminist Revelation" and "Philosophers Against the Family," which she published during the early 1990s, Sommers argued that many academic feminists were "radical philosophers" who sought dramatic social and cultural change—such as the abolition of the nuclear family—and thus revealed their contempt for the actual wishes of the "average woman." These articles, which Friedman states are "marred by ambiguities, inconsistencies, dubious factual claims, misrepresentations of feminist literature, and faulty arguments", would form the basis for Sommers' 1994 book Who Stole Feminism?.

=== Later work ===
Sommers has written articles for Time, The Washington Post, The Wall Street Journal and The New York Times. She hosts a video blog called The Factual Feminist on YouTube. Sommers created a video "course" for the conservative website PragerU.

Sommers has also appeared on Red Ice's white nationalist podcast Radio 3Fourteen. Sommers later said that she did not know about the podcast prior to her appearance.

=== Who Stole Feminism? ===
In Who Stole Feminism?, Sommers outlines her distinction between gender feminism, (Note: The sociologist Robert Menzies writes that the book seems to have popularized the term gender feminist.) which she regards as being the dominant contemporary approach to feminism, and equity feminism, which she presents as more akin to first-wave feminism. She uses the work to argue that contemporary feminism is too radical and disconnected from the lives of typical American women, presenting her equity feminism alternative as a better match for their needs. Sommers describes herself as "a feminist who does not like what feminism has become". She characterizes gender feminism as having transcended the liberalism of early feminists so that instead of focusing on rights for all, gender feminists view society through the sex/gender prism and focus on recruiting women to join the struggle against patriarchy. Reason reviewed Who Stole Feminism?: How Women Have Betrayed Women and characterized gender feminism as the action of accenting the differences of genders in order to create what Sommers believes is privilege for women in academia, government, industry, or the advancement of personal agendas.

In criticizing contemporary feminism, Sommers writes that an often-mentioned March of Dimes study, which says that "domestic violence is the leading cause of birth defects," does not exist and that violence against women does not peak during the Super Bowl, which she describes as an urban legend. She argues that such statements about domestic violence helped shape the Violence Against Women Act, which initially allocated $1.6 billion a year in federal funds for ending domestic violence against women. Similarly, she argues that feminists assert that approximately 150,000 women die each year from anorexia, an apparent distortion of the American Anorexia and Bulimia Association's figure that 150,000 females have some degree of anorexia.

=== The War Against Boys ===
In 2000, Sommers published The War Against Boys: How Misguided Feminism Is Harming Our Young Men. In the book, Sommers challenged what she called the "myth of shortchanged girls" and the "new and equally corrosive fiction" that "boys as a group are disturbed." Criticizing programs that had been set up in the 1980s to encourage girls and young women, largely in response to studies that had suggested that girls "suffered through neglect in the classroom and the indifference of male-dominated society," Sommers argued in The War Against Boys that such programs were based on flawed research. She asserted that reality was quite the opposite: boys were a year and a half behind girls in reading and writing, and they were less likely to go to college.

She blamed Carol Gilligan as well as organizations such as the National Organization for Women (NOW) for creating a situation in which "boys are resented, both as the unfairly privileged sex and as obstacles on the path to gender justice for girls." According to Sommers, "a review of the facts shows boys, not girls, on the weak side of an education gender gap."

The book received mixed reviews. In conservative publications such as the National Review and Commentary, The War Against Boys was praised for its "stinging indictment of an anti-male movement that has had a pervasive influence on the nation's schools" and for identifying "a problem in urgent need of redress." Writing in The New York Times, opinion columnist Richard Bernstein called it a "thoughtful, provocative book" and suggested that Sommers had made her arguments "persuasively and unflinchingly, and with plenty of data to support them." Joy Summers, in The Journal of School Choice, said that "Sommers' book and her public voice are in themselves a small antidote to the junk science girding our typically commonsense-free, utterly ideological national debate on 'women's issues'." Publishers Weekly suggested that Sommers' conclusions were "compelling" and "deserve an unbiased hearing," while also noting that Sommers "descends into pettiness when she indulges in mudslinging at her opponents." Similarly, a review in Booklist suggested that while Sommers "argues cogently that boys are having major problems in school," the book was unlikely to convince all readers "that these problems are caused by the American Association of University Women, Carol Gilligan, Mary Pipher, and William S. Pollack," all of whom were strongly criticized in the book. Ultimately, the review suggested, "Sommers is as much of a crisismonger as those she critiques."

In a review of The War Against Boys for The New York Times, child psychiatrist Robert Coles wrote that Sommers "speaks of our children, yet hasn't sought them out; instead she attends those who have, in fact, worked with boys and girls—and in so doing is quick to look askance at Carol Gilligan's ideas about girls, [William] Pollack's about boys." Much of the book, according to Coles, "comes across as Sommers's strongly felt war against those two prominent psychologists, who have spent years trying to learn how young men and women grow to adulthood in the United States." Reviewing the book for The New Yorker, Nicholas Lemann wrote that Sommers "sets the research bar considerably higher for the people she is attacking than she does for herself," using an "odd, ambushing style of refutation, in which she demands that data be provided to her and questions answered, and then, when the flummoxed person on the other end of the line stammers helplessly, triumphantly reports that she got 'em." Lemann faulted Sommers for accusing Gilligan of using anecdotal argument when her own book "rests on an anecdotal base" and for making numerous assertions that were not supported by the footnotes in her book.

Writing in The Washington Post, E. Anthony Rotundo stated that "in the end, Sommers ... does not show that there is a 'war against boys.' All she can show is that feminists are attacking her 'boys-will-be-boys' concept of boyhood, just as she attacks their more flexible notion." Sommers's title, according to Rotundo, "is not just wrong but inexcusably misleading... a work of neither dispassionate social science nor reflective scholarship; it is a conservative polemic."

In the updated and revised edition published in 2013, Sommers responded to her critics by changing the subtitle of the book from How misguided feminism harms our young men to How misguided policies harm our young men, and provided new and updated statistics that position her earlier work, in her view, as prophetic. When asked by Maclean's whether her work is still controversial, Sommers responded:

It was when I first wrote the book. At the time, women's groups promoted the idea that girls were second-class citizens in our schools. [...] David Sadker claimed that when boys call out answers in school, teachers are respectful and interested—whereas when girls do it, they are told to be quiet. [...] This became a showcase factoid of the shortchanged girl movement. But it turned out that the research behind the claim was nowhere to be found. It was a baseless myth: the result of advocacy research. I have looked at U.S. Department of Education data on more conventional measures: grades, college matriculation, school engagement, test scores. Now more than ever, you find that boys are on the wrong side of the gender gap.

== Advocacy ==
Sommers has served on the board of the Women's Freedom Network, a group formed as an alternative to "extremist, ideological feminism" as well as to "antifeminist traditionalism" but described by historian Debra L. Schultz as comprising mostly "conservative ideologues in the political correctness debates". In the 1990s, she was a member of the National Association of Scholars, a conservative political advocacy group. She is a member of the Board of Advisors of the Foundation for Individual Rights in Education. She has served on the national advisory board of the Independent Women's Forum and the Center of the American Experiment.

Sommers has defended the Gamergate harassment campaign, saying that its members were "just defending a hobby they love." This advocacy in favor of Gamergate earned her praise from members of the men's rights movement, inspiring fan art and the nickname "Based Mom", which Sommers embraced. During Gamergate, Sommers appeared at several events with far-right political commentator Milo Yiannopoulos. In 2019, Sommers endorsed Andrew Yang's campaign during the 2020 Democratic presidential primaries.

== Awards ==
The Women's Political Caucus (NWPC) awarded Sommers with one of its twelve 2013 Exceptional Merit in Media Awards for her The New York Times article "The Boys at the Back." In their description of the winners, NWPC states, "Author Christina Sommers asks whether we should allow girls to reap the advantages of a new knowledge based service economy and take the mantle from boys, or should we acknowledge the roots of feminism and strive for equal education for all?"

== Personal life ==
Sommers married Fred Sommers, the Harry A. Wolfson Chair in Philosophy at Brandeis University, in 1981. He died in 2014. Through Fred, her stepson is Tamler Sommers; who is a philosopher and podcast host.

== See also ==
- Individualist feminism

== Selected works ==
=== Books ===
- (1984). (ed.). Vice & Virtue in Everyday Life: Introductory Readings in Ethics. San Diego: Harcourt Brace Jovanovich. Co-edited with Robert J. Fogelin for the 2nd and 3rd editions, and with Fred Sommers for the 4th and subsequent editions. ISBN 0-15-594890-3
- (1986) (ed.). Right and Wrong: Basic Readings in Ethics. San Diego: Harcourt Brace Jovanovich. Co-edited with Robert J. Fogelin. ISBN 0-15-577110-8
- (1994). Who Stole Feminism?: How Women Have Betrayed Women. New York: Simon & Schuster. ISBN 978-0-684-84956-0
- (2000 and 2013). The War Against Boys. New York: Simon & Schuster. ISBN 0-684-84956-9 and ISBN 978-1-451-64418-0
- (2005). (with Sally Satel, M.D.). One Nation Under Therapy. New York: St. Martin's Press. ISBN 978-0-312-30444-7
- (2009). The Science on Women in Science. Washington, D.C.: AEI Press. ISBN 978-0-8447-4281-6
- (2013). Freedom Feminism: Its Surprising History and Why It Matters Today. Washington, D.C.: AEI Press. ISBN 978-0-844-77262-2

=== Articles ===
- (1988). "Should the Academy Support Academic Feminism?". Public Affairs Quarterly. 2: 97–120.
- (1990). "The Feminist Revelation". Social Philosophy and Policy. 8(1): 152–157.
- (1990). "Do These feminists Like Women?". Journal of Social Philosophy. 21(2) (Fall): 66–74.
