= Agnes Morey =

Agnes H. Morey
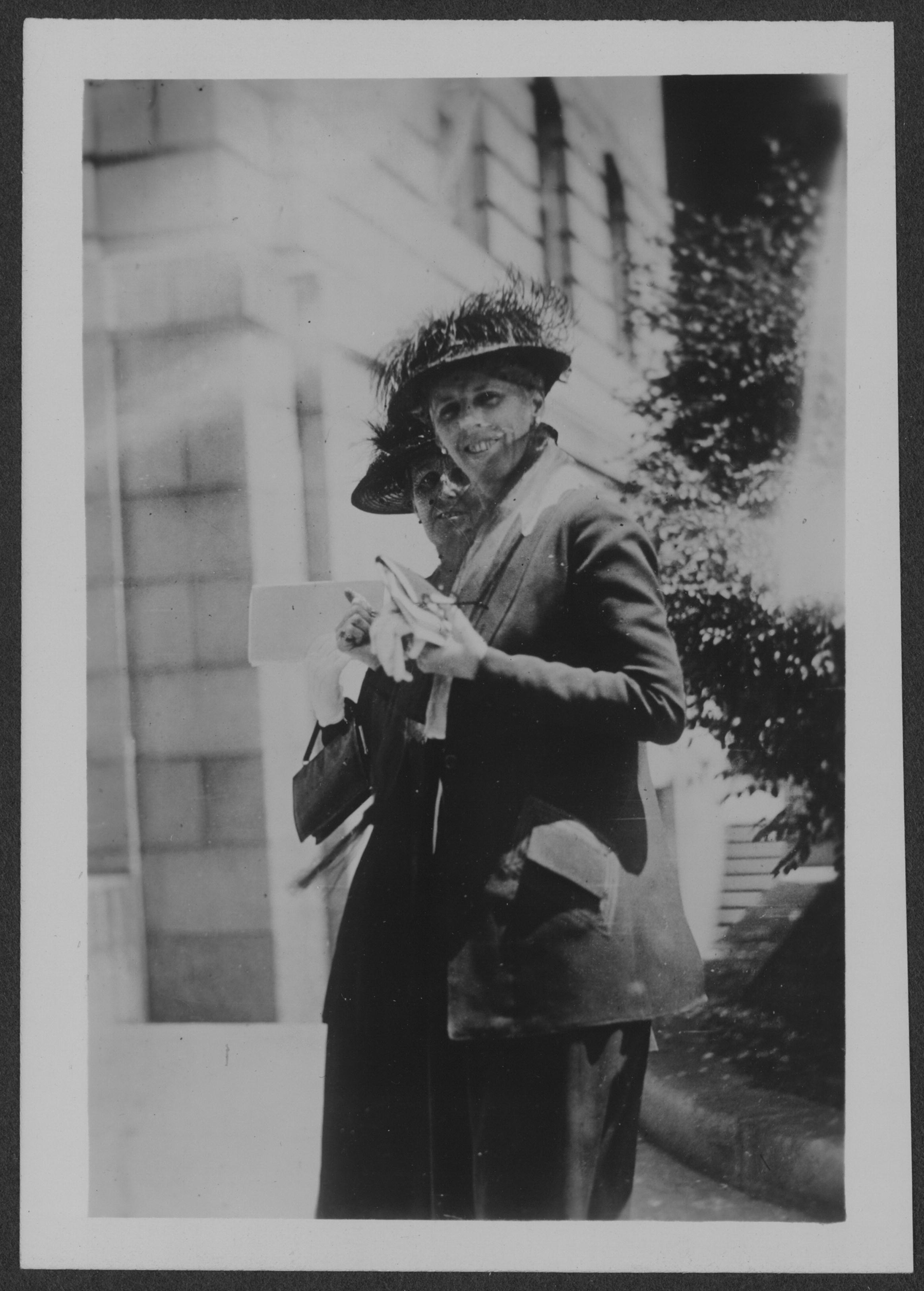
- Years active: 1914-1924
- Known for: Suffrage Work, Equal Rights Amendment
- Political party: National Woman's Party
- Movement: Women's Suffrage
- Relatives: Katherine A. Morey (daughter)

Agnes Morey was a suffragist from Massachusetts and member of the National Woman's Party. She was known as a gifted public speaker and a highly effective political organizer who played an important role in the final push for women's suffrage.

== Suffrage work ==
Morey was involved with the women's suffrage movement as far back as 1914.

=== Affiliation with the National Woman's Party ===
By 1916, she was a member of the National Woman's Party and a leader from the state of Massachusetts. She protested in front of the White House in 1917. That year she was sent to prison for protesting. A 1918 edition of The Suffragist listed her as a Vice Chairwoman of the NWP.

After women won the right to vote in Massachusetts, Morey was quoted as saying, "In this state from now on, our entire efforts will be concentrated upon securing ratification in other states.”

=== Prison Special ===
Morey took part in the "Prison Special" tour of suffragists who had been sent to prison for advocating for women's suffrage. The purpose of this tour was to call on Congress to pass an amendment enfranchising women.

=== Boston protest ===
One of Morey's most notable activities as a suffragist was to protest President Woodrow Wilson's visit to Boston in 1919.

== Campaign for the Equal Rights Amendment ==
Agnes Morey was an early supporter of the Equal Rights Amendment. Alongside Alice Paul, she attended the 1923 convention in Seneca Falls where the ERA was introduced and presided over this historic event.

== Personal life ==
Agnes Hosmer Morey was from Brookline, Massachusetts and descended. She was the mother of Katherine Morey who was also a prominent suffragist. Much of the press of Katherine Morey mentioned she descended from a socially prominent family. Both women worked as leaders of the National Woman's Party in Massachusetts. She died in 1924.
