= Tamler Sommers =

American philosopher and writer

Tamler Sommers is an American philosopher, writer, and podcaster. He is the son of philosopher Fred Sommers and the stepson of Christina Hoff Sommers. Sommers specializes in ethics, free will, and moral responsibility. His 2018 book, Why Honor Matters, examines the nature of honor in American discourse and defends several aspects of honor cultures. He co-hosts the podcast Very Bad Wizards with David A. Pizarro.

Sommers received his Ph.D. in philosophy at Duke University in 2005 and is currently a professor of philosophy at the University of Houston.

== Books ==
- A Very Bad Wizard: Morality Behind the Curtain (2009). ISBN 0-415-85879-8
- Relative Justice: Cultural Diversity, Free Will, and Moral Responsibility (2012). ISBN 0-691-13993-8
- Why Honor Matters (2018). ISBN 0-465-09887-8
