= Magda Oranich i Solagran =

Catalan lawyer and politician (born 1945)

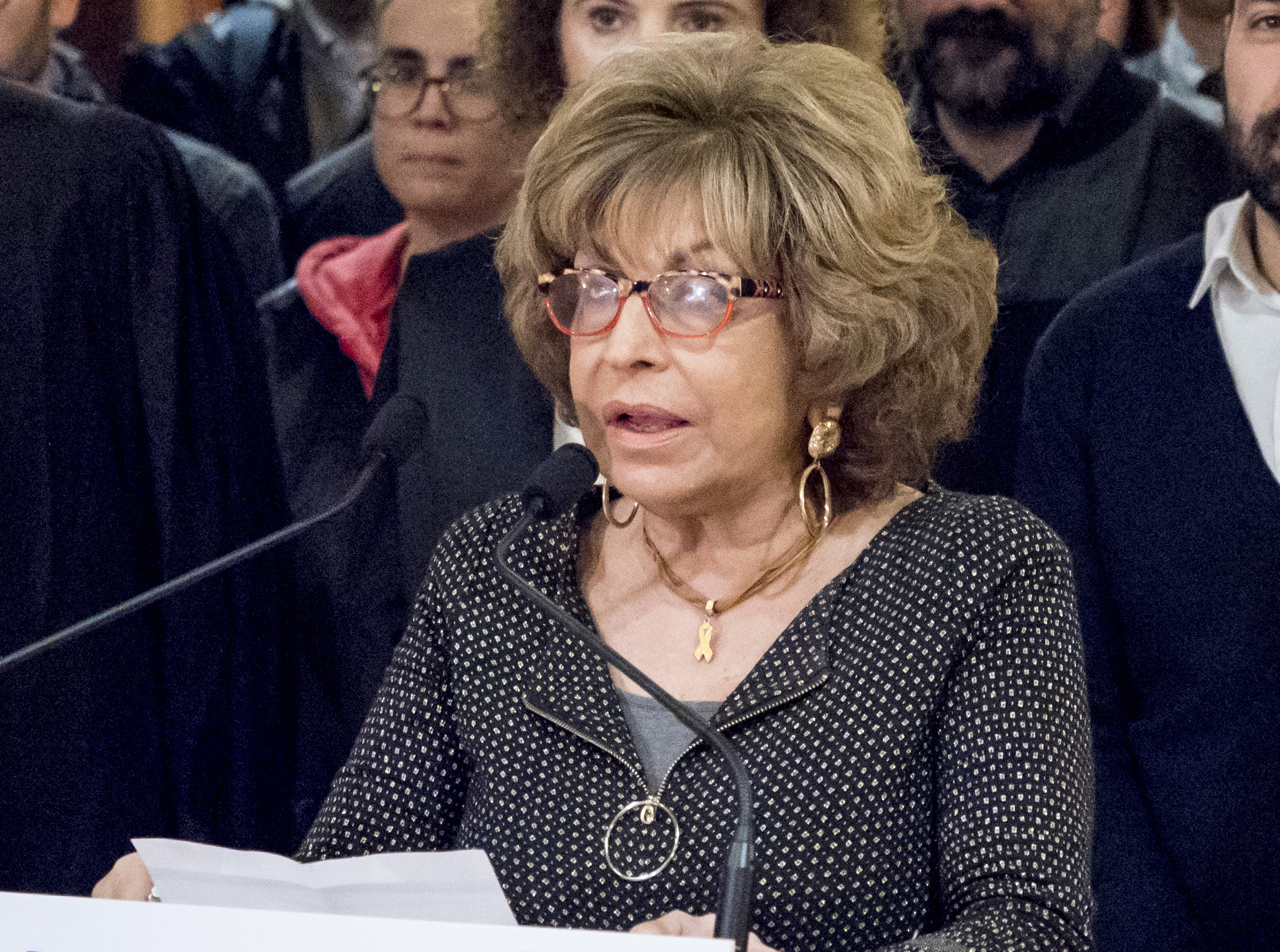
Oranich in 2019

Magda Oranich i Solagran (born 11 December 1945) is a Spanish lawyer, journalist and politician from Catalonia. She was a member of the Parliament of Catalonia in its 4th session, and stood for election again, unsuccessfully, in 2017. Her legal speciality is in family law.

Oranich graduated in law from the University of Barcelona in 1968. She defended several political prisoners under the Franco regime, including Salvador Puig Antich. She has worked on issues of women's rights and human rights, representing many victims of rape and assault, and also the victims of the Francoist orphanages. She has been active in the field of animal rights, in particular in the campaign which led to the abolition of bullfighting in Catalonia in 2010. She has served FC Barcelona in several roles and was appointed to its board in 2009.

In 2017 she was awarded the Medal of Honour of Barcelona.
