= Women's Freedom Network =

The Women's Freedom Network (WFN) is a political advocacy group founded by sociologist Rita J. Simon and journalist Cathy Young. Founded in 1993 in Washington, D.C., The group aims to provide an alternative to "extremist, ideological feminism" as well as to "antifeminist traditionalism".

Elayne Rapping writes that the group's board has had "an impressive range of professional women [...] who are well connected to powerful institutions". Board members have included former U.S. ambassador to the United Nations Jeane Kirkpatrick, lawyer and television personality Rikki Klieman, author and philosopher Christina Hoff Sommers, writer and editor Edith Kurzweil, Harvard University law professor Mary Ann Glendon, political columnist Mona Charen, and academics Jean Bethke Elshtain and Elizabeth Fox-Genovese.

According to the Historical Dictionary of Feminism, feminists view the WFN as "faux feminist" due to its financial support from prominent conservative foundations. Historian Debra L. Schultz writes that the group represents mostly "conservative ideologues in the political correctness debates". The group's members have been involved with the conservative women's organizations Concerned Women for America and Independent Women's Forum.
