= Cathy Young =

Russian-American writer (born 1963)

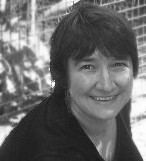
- Born: Yekaterina Jung; February 10, 1963 (age 63); Moscow, Soviet Union (now Russia)
- Other name: Catherine Alicia Young
- Education: Rutgers University, New Brunswick (BA)
- Occupation: Journalist

Catherine Alicia Young (born Yekaterina Jung; Russian: Екатерина Юнг; born February 10, 1963) is a Russian-American political commentator. She is primarily known for her writing about feminism and other cultural issues, as well as about Russia and the former Soviet Union. Young is the author of two books, a frequent contributor to the American libertarian monthly Reason, and a regular columnist for Newsday. In 2022, she joined The Bulwark as a staff writer. She describes her political views as "libertarian/conservative".

== Life and career ==
Cathy Young was born in Moscow to a Jewish family, and was 17 when her family emigrated to the United States in 1980. She became a naturalized citizen in 1987 as Catherine Alicia Young and graduated from Rutgers University in 1988. She completed her autobiography, Growing Up in Moscow: Memories of a Soviet Girlhood, published in 1989.

Young is a contributing editor at Reason. Since 2014, she has regularly contributed to Time magazine.

== Feminism ==
=== Views ===
In her second book, Ceasefire!: Why Women and Men Must Join Forces to Achieve True Equality, published in 1999, Young criticized both feminism and traditionalism from what she described as a "pro-equality point of view", a philosophy which she says may be called "feminism or something else". Young has defended the social media campaign Women Against Feminism.

Describing the Gamergate controversy in relation to feminism, Young has stated that she believes that Gamergate is a backlash against feminism but one that is "against a particular kind of feminism, one that has a tendency to look obsessively for offences, read ideology into everything, and demonize male sexuality under the pretext of stamping out 'the objectification of women'."

In 2015, Young wrote an article in The Daily Beast in which she interviewed the student whom anti-rape activist Emma Sulkowicz accused of rape. In a response, Sulkowicz described Young as an "anti-feminist", saying that Young published Facebook conversations between her and her alleged rapist to shame her. Heather Wilhelm wrote in RealClearPolitics that Young's article about Sulkowicz "sets aside the hype and soberly assesses the facts." Citing Young's article, Katie Zavadski described her in New York magazine as a "contrarian feminist".

Young supports legally recognizing same-sex marriages. She describes her political views as "libertarian/conservative".

=== Reception ===
Young co-founded the Women's Freedom Network in 1993. The group aims to provide an alternative to "extremist, ideological feminism" as well as to "antifeminist traditionalism". According to historian Debra L. Schultz, the group represents mostly "conservative ideologues in the political correctness debates".

In his book The Blank Slate, Steven Pinker identifies Young as an "equity feminist", and further describes her as an "iconoclastic columnist" who has argued against rape-related "dogma". She has also written stories critical of campus anti-rape activism. Commentary magazine stated that Young re-investigates "atrocious coverage of campus sexual assault myths" in the "hopes of setting the record straight and minimizing some of the incredible damage the accusations have done".

== Bibliography ==
- Growing Up In Moscow: Memories of a Soviet Girlhood (1989) (ISBN 0709041306)
- Ceasefire!: Why Women and Men Must Join Forces to Achieve True Equality (1999) (ISBN 0684834421)
