= Who Stole Feminism? =

1994 book by Christina Hoff Sommers

Who Stole Feminism? How Women Have Betrayed Women
- Cover of the first edition
- Author: Christina Hoff Sommers
- Language: English
- Subject: Feminism in the United States
- Publisher: Simon & Schuster
- Publication date: June 3, 1994
- Publication place: United States
- Media type: Print (Hardcover and Paperback)
- Pages: 320
- ISBN: 978-0-684-80156-8

Who Stole Feminism? How Women Have Betrayed Women is a 1994 book about American feminism by Christina Hoff Sommers, a writer who was at that time a philosophy professor at Clark University. Sommers argues that there is a split between equity feminism and what she terms "gender feminism". Sommers contends that equity feminists seek equal legal rights for women and men, while gender feminists seek to counteract historical inequalities based on gender. Sommers argues that gender feminists have made false claims about issues such as anorexia and domestic battery and exerted a harmful influence on American college campuses. Who Stole Feminism? received wide attention for its attack on American feminism, and it was given highly polarized reviews divided between conservative and liberal commentators. Some reviewers praised the book, while others found it flawed.

== Summary ==
Sommers argues that, "American feminism is currently dominated by a group of women who seek to persuade the public that American women are not the free creatures we think we are." She refers to the ideology of feminists who believe that "our society is best described as a patriarchy, a 'male hegemony,' a 'sex/gender system' in which the dominant gender works to keep women cowering and submissive", as "gender feminism." She identifies herself with "equity feminism," based on belief in fair treatment for everyone. She criticizes feminist authors such as Naomi Wolf and Gloria Steinem, writing that in The Beauty Myth (1990), Wolf falsely claims that in the United States 150,000 women die of anorexia each year, a claim repeated by Steinem. According to Sommers, while "most experts are reluctant to give exact figures," the actual figure is likely to be somewhere between 100 and 400 deaths per year. Sommers criticizes Sheila Kuehl, Laura Flanders of Fairness and Accuracy in Reporting, and other writers and activists, for helping to popularize the claim that "incidence of domestic battery tended to rise by 40 percent" on Super Bowl Sunday, writing that the claim, widely reported by the American media, was unsupported by any study. Sommers argues that feminists have falsely accused the English legal historian William Blackstone of supporting a man's right to beat his wife. She writes that British law has prohibited wife beating since the 1700s, and American law has done the same since before the American Revolution, though the laws were sometimes only "indifferently enforced."

According to Sommers, many feminist theorists and researchers have dealt with male critics by calling them "sexist" or "reactionary", and female critics by calling them "traitors" or "collaborators", and that such tactics have "alienated and silenced women and men alike." In her view, gender feminism began to develop in the middle of the 1960s, due to "the antiwar and antigovernment mood" and the influence of thinkers such as Karl Marx, Jean-Paul Sartre, Herbert Marcuse, and Frantz Fanon. Sommers writes that Kate Millett's Sexual Politics (1969) "was critical in moving feminism in this new direction", teaching women that politics is "essentially sexual" and that "even the so-called democracies" are "male hegemonies." Sommers points to philosopher Michel Foucault and his Discipline and Punish (1975) as influences on Wolf and Susan Faludi, author of Backlash: The Undeclared War Against American Women (1991). She argues that Foucault's work is overrated. Discussing the influence of feminists on college campuses, she writes that in many cases feminist "consciousness-raisers are driving out the scholars." She adds that, "The gender feminists have proved very adroit in getting financial support from governmental and private sources" and "hold the keys to many bureaucratic fiefdoms, research centers, women's studies programs, tenure committees, and para-academic organizations. It is now virtually impossible to be appointed to high administrative office in any university system without having passed muster with the gender feminist."

Sommers expresses a favorable view of writers like the philosopher Janet Radcliffe Richards, author of The Sceptical Feminist (1980), Katie Roiphe, author of The Morning After (1993), whom Sommers defends against criticism from Katha Pollitt, and the critic Camille Paglia. Sommers argues that Paglia's Sexual Personae (1990) should have led to her being "acknowledged as an outstanding woman scholar even by those who take strong exception to her unfashionable views," and criticizes the Women's Review of Books for calling the book a work of "crackpot extremism" and feminist professors at Connecticut College for comparing it to the German dictator Adolf Hitler's Mein Kampf (1925).

== Reception ==
=== 1994–1999 ===
Who Stole Feminism? was first reviewed in Kirkus Reviews in April 1994, two months prior to publication. The staff at Kirkus said that Sommers' book highlighted instances of "shoddy" research in feminist studies but failed to tell the reader about similar poor quality research in other fields. Sommers was said to be confused about categories of feminism, to have invented a sort of "gender feminism" to fit her purpose of promoting her brand of liberal feminism, and to have created "a theory of conspiracy equal in force to those she seeks to debunk." Kirkus said that Sommers presumed to speak for the majority of feminists "without providing persuasive evidence that most women are liberal feminists." Sommers was praised for her valid challenges to feminist ideology, but her assumptions were described as flawed.

Literary theorist Nina Auerbach reviewed the book for The New York Times Book Review in June 1994. She described Sommers' reasoning as being "vitiated by its logical flaws" and said that the John M. Olin Foundation, which paid for the book's publication, should have found "a less muddled writer" for the task. Sommers responded to the criticism by saying that the Times should not have assigned Auerbach to the review, since, as an organizer of a feminist event portrayed negatively in the book, she was sure to be prejudiced against the ideas in the book. Conservatives such as Jim Sleeper, Howard Kurtz and Rush Limbaugh defended Sommers; Limbaugh said that the Times was attempting to "kill this book." The feminist columnist Katha Pollitt, however, thought Auerbach's review was too polite and failed to give Sommers' book "the pasting it deserved."

Editor Deirdre English writing in The Washington Post Book World was appreciative of the investigative aspect of Sommers' work, but she questioned the polarized depiction of feminism. Calling Sommers a "well-published conservative [who] is itching for a fight," she said the book would likely provoke debate "as well as some retractions." English said of the book that "the root question is whether women want equality with men as they are, in the world men have shaped, or if women seek change in that world."

The book was positively reviewed by Cathy Young who was an executive colleague of Sommers in the Women's Freedom Network. It was also highly praised in the National Review by Sommers' close friend Mary Lefkowitz. Paglia called the book a "landmark study... which uses ingenious detective work to unmask the shocking fraud and propaganda of establishment feminism and the servility of American media and academe to Machiavellian feminist manipulation," adding that, "Sommers has done a great service for women and for feminism, whose fundamental principles she has clarified and strengthened." Melanie Kirkpatrick, writing in The Wall Street Journal, gave the book high marks, saying that "Sommers simply lines up her facts and shoots one bull's-eye after another."

John M. Ellis, a scholar of German literature, praised Sommers for challenging the "intellectual deterioration" that feminism has caused within humanities departments in the United States. He writes that Sommers' book, along with others by authors with similar views, was met with "bitter hostility" from campus feminists, and that when Rebecca Sinkler, the editor of the New York Times Book Review, gave the book to her friend and former teacher Auerbach to review, the result was a "predictable trashing." According to Ellis, "the malice and dishonesty of Auerbach's review was so obvious... that it provoked not just a storm of protest but a response almost without precedent." According to Ellis, a series of newspapers, including the New York Daily News and The Washington Post, commented on what they saw as unethical behavior by Sinkler and Auerbach.

The gay-rights activist John Lauritsen, writing in A Freethinker's Primer of Male Love, agrees with Sommers that women are the main victims of "gender feminists."

Sommers' claims regarding the legal permissiveness of wife beating have been criticized as inaccurate. In arguing that British law since the 1700s and American law since before the Revolution prohibits wife beating, Sommers quotes Blackstone as saying that the "husband was prohibited from using any violence to his wife..." Criticizing Who Stole Feminism?, Linda Hirshman and Laura Flanders separately noted that Sommers left out the other half of Blackstone's sentence that says in Latin "other than that which lawfully and reasonably belongs to the husband for the due government and correction of his wife." Hirshman, writing in the Los Angeles Times, stated that while Sommers addressed two early American cases where men were convicted for wife-beating, she left out a case where the husband was not convicted. Flanders noted in Extra!, published by progressive media watchdog Fairness and Accuracy in Reporting, that Blackstone's "complete text says the exact opposite of Sommers' partial quotation". In an overall negative review, Flanders charged Sommers with making the same mistakes she accused feminists of making, and that Who Stole Feminism? contained "unsubstantiated charges", citations to "advocacy research", and statistical errors likely based on a misreading of the source material. Sommers responded a week after Hirshman's Los Angeles Times piece, writing that Blackstone's quotation had been misinterpreted, and had only been citing an outdated law since superseded, and responded to FAIR's criticisms in a letter to the editor of FAIR's monthly magazine, EXTRA!

Dale Bauer and Katherine Rhoades write that Sommers is mistaken in her assumptions about the way students approach challenging ideas presented to them. Sommers devoted a chapter to a negative depiction of a "feminist classroom" where the values of the teacher overwhelmed the students; she felt a classroom should be objectively free of values. Bauer and Rhoades contradict Sommers, describing how students "always bring their own assumptions and values to class" and that they expect an active and lively exchange of ideas between the teacher and the other students. Elaine Ginsberg and Sara Lennox describe Sommers' research as "anecdotal" and state that the book's most serious conceptual flaw is Sommers' failure to account for why women in society "have not always been treated fairly." They cite psychology professor Faye Crosby's assertion that Sommers' main agenda was simply "to sell books," but argue that Who Stole Feminism?, nonetheless, represents a threat in its attempt to redefine feminism.

Describing the book and other literature on "victimhood" politics as "ephemeral pop sociology," the criminologist Samuel Walker wrote in 1998 that in "demolishing some of the careless and absurd allegations made by some feminists," Sommers "ignores the underlying issue[s]."

In 1999, the philosopher Martha Nussbaum described Sommers' categories of equity feminist and gender feminist as ambiguous, saying:

[A] gender feminist, for Sommers, is any thinker who believes that (1) women's suffrage did not remove a systemic asymmetry of power between women and men in our society, and/or (2) the existing preferences of women and men in our society concerning gender issues may be corrupted by social forces and not always reliable bases for the formation of social policy.

According to Nussbaum, this concept of gender feminism "fits almost all contemporary social thinkers in political thought and economics," and so does not helpfully sort feminists into opposing categories.

=== 2000–present ===
The sociologist Rhonda Hammer writes that Sommers, despite her debunking of the figure that there is a 40% increase of domestic violence incidents associated with the annual Super Bowl game, went too far in claiming that "no study shows that Super Bowl Sunday is in any way different from other days in the amount of domestic violence". Hammer states that Sommers ignored a variety of studies that showed increased domestic violence during the Super Bowl.

The anthropologist Melvin Konner writes that, like Warren Farrell's The Myth of Male Power (1993), Who Stole Feminism? is a good antidote to the way in which "real knowledge about sex roles...tends to get buried in postmodernist rhetoric."

Anne-Marie Kinahan places Who Stole Feminism? alongside Rene Denfeld's The New Victorians and Katie Roiphe's The Morning After in the context of a "post-feminist" movement, and contends these books signalled a collective "fear of the perceived radicalism of feminism on university campuses, a radicalism which these authors attribute to the increasing influence of queer theory, 'radical' lesbians and feminists of colour." Kinahan charges Sommers, Denfeld and Roiphe with attempting to "reclaim feminism as a white, middle-class, straight woman's movement" and defending "traditional hierarchies of morality, religion, and the nuclear family." Kinahan finds Sommers to be contradictory in asserting that students are resistant to radical feminism, yet also claiming that feminist indoctrination of students poses a "drastic danger" which "powerless, naive, and unthinking students unquestionably endorse."

The political scientist Ronnee Schreiber writes that the conservative Independent Women's Forum continues as of 2012 to use the book to portray feminists as scheming falsifiers of statistical data.

== See also ==
- First-wave feminism – Period of feminist activity, 19th and early 20th centuries
- Individualist feminism – Libertarian feminist movement
- "Victim feminism" – Term used to critique certain forms of feminist activism
