= Difference feminism =

Opposition to equality feminism

Difference feminism is a term developed during the equality-versus-difference debate in American feminism to describe the view that men and women are different, but that no value judgment can be placed upon them and both sexes have equal moral status as persons.

Most strains of difference feminism did not argue that there was a biological, inherent, ahistorical, or otherwise "essential" link between womanhood and traditionally feminine values, habits of mind (often called "ways of knowing"), or personality traits. These feminists simply sought to recognize that, in the present, women and men are significantly different and to explore the devalued "feminine" characteristics. This variety of difference feminism is also called gender feminism.

However, some forms of difference feminism – such as Mary Daly's – argue that women and their values are superior to those of men. There is ongoing debate about whether Daly's feminism is essentialist.

== History ==
The "difference" feminist view was developed in the 1980s, in part as a reaction to popular liberal feminism (also known as "equality feminism"), which emphasized the similarities between women and men in order to argue for equal treatment for women. Liberal feminists aimed to make society and law gender-neutral, since it saw recognition of gender difference as a barrier to rights and participation within liberal democracy.

Difference feminism, although it still aimed at equality between men and women, emphasized the differences between men and women and argued that identicality or sameness are not necessary in order for men and women, and masculine and feminine values, to be treated equally. It held that gender-neutrality harmed women "whether by impelling them to imitate men, by depriving society of their distinctive contributions, or by letting them participate in society only on terms that favor men".

Difference feminists drew on earlier nineteenth-century strains of thought, for example the work of German writer Elise Oelsner, which held that not only should women be allowed into formerly male-only spheres and institutions (e.g. public life, science) but that those institutions should also be expected to change in a way that recognizes the value of traditionally devalued feminine ethics, like care. On the latter point, many feminists have re-read the phrase "difference feminism" in a way that asks "what difference does feminism make?" (e.g. to the practice of science) rather than "what differences are there between men and women"?

== Criticism ==
In the 1990s, feminists addressed the binary logic of "difference" versus "equality" and moved on from it, notably with postmodern and/or deconstructionist approaches that either dismantled or did not depend on that dichotomy. By treating women as a homogeneous group, they argued, difference feminists were reproducing the very logic they sought to challenge.

Some have argued that the thought of certain prominent second-wave feminists, like psychologist Carol Gilligan and radical feminist theologian Mary Daly, is essentialist, attaching fixed essences or essential properties to "woman" and "man". However, essentialist interpretations of Daly and Gilligan have been questioned by other feminist scholars, who argue that charges of "essentialism" are often used more as terms of abuse than as theoretical critiques based on evidence, and do not accurately reflect Gilligan or Daly's views.

== In France ==
Commonly labeled "French feminism", the work of Hélène Cixous, Luce Irigaray and Julia Kristeva has been considered a form of difference feminism. Their psychoanalytic approach to sexual difference perceived the search for equality as a phallocentric erasure of the specificities of the female body. Like the American differentialist authors, "French feminists are regularly accused of essentialism."

== See also ==
- Cultural feminism
- Écriture féminine
- Equality feminism
- Ethics of care
- Neofeminism
- New feminism
- Radical feminism
- Separate spheres
