= Equality feminism =

Subset of feminism

Equality feminism is a subset of the overall feminism movement and more specifically of the liberal feminist tradition that focuses on the basic similarities between men and women, and whose ultimate goal is the equality of both genders in all domains. This includes economic and political equality, equal access within the workplace, freedom from oppressive gender stereotyping, and an androgynous worldview.

Feminist theory seeks to promote the legal status of women as equal and undifferentiated from that of men. While equality feminists largely agree that men and women have basic biological differences in anatomy and frame, they argue that on a psychological level, the capability of using of rationality or reason is equal between men and women. For equality feminists, men and women are equal in terms of their ability to reason, achieve goals, and prosper in both the work and home front.

Equality feminism was the dominant version of feminism following Mary Wollstonecraft's A Vindication of the Rights of Woman (1792). Wollstonecraft made the case that women's equality to men manifests itself in education and worker's rights and further produced a proverbial roadmap in order for future women to follow in terms of activism and feminist theorizing. Since then, active equality feminists have included Simone de Beauvoir, the Seneca Falls Convention Leaders, Elizabeth Cady Stanton, Lucretia Coffin Mott, Susan B. Anthony, Betty Friedan, and Gloria Steinem.

While equality feminism was the dominant perspective of feminism during the 19th and 20th century, the 1980s and 1990s brought about a new focus in popular feminism on difference feminism, or the essential differences between men and women. In opposition to equality feminism, this view advocates for the celebration of the "feminine" by focusing on traditionally viewed female traits, such as empathy, nurturing, and care. While equality feminists view human nature as essentially androgynous, difference feminists claim that this viewpoint aligns the "good" with male-dominated stereotypes, thus operating within the patriarchal framework of society.

== History ==
In both law and in theology, women were portrayed as both physically and intellectually inferior. One of the first feminist documents that set the stage for feministic movements occurred when Mary Wollstonecraft wrote A Vindication of the Rights of Woman in 1792. While this literature was seen as rebellious at the time, it echoed the feelings of women throughout France as women's republican clubs demanded that liberty, equality, and fraternity should be applied to both genders. While this movement gained notoriety, it was eventually extinguished by Napoleon Bonaparte's Code Napoleon that established that the husband had complete control over the family.

While much of the equality feminism movements that occurred in France were not successful, they influenced much of the movements that occurred in North America in the 1800s. Both Abigail Adams and Mercy Otis Warren fought for woman's emancipation to be included in the constitution of 1776, to no avail. However, Elizabeth Cady Stanton and Lucretia Coffin Mott, along with thousands of other women, forever changed the dynamics of equality feminism with the women's convention at Seneca Falls, New York, in 1848. Here, along with independence, they demanded full legal equality in all aspects of life (education, commercial opportunities, compensation, voting rights, etc.). With the influence of Elizabeth Cady Stanton and Susan B. Anthony, this movement expanded into Europe. In 1869, John Stuart Mill published The Subjection of Women, in which he argued that equality between the sexes would translate to more moral and intellectual advancement, which in turn would result in more human happiness for everyone.

After its expansion into Europe, the movement's growth slowed until 1920, when the woman suffrage movement occurred; many women were divided on the issue of whether or not women were on equal standing with men. This continued until the United Nations Commission on the Status of Women was established in 1946 to secure equal political, economic, and educational opportunities for women throughout the world. In 1949, French existentialist Simone de Beauvoir published the work The Second Sex, in which she debunks many of the claims made regarding women and the fight for gender equality. In 1963, another literature pertaining to equality feminism arose, Betty Friedan's The Feminine Mystique, in which she discussed "the problem that has no name," referring to the widespread unhappiness of women in the 1950s. She uses this information to describe many of the gender inequalities that society has created that have resulted in this unhappiness, citing the personal example of giving up her psychology career to tend to her children. Using these literatures as a guide, feminism once again arose in the United States with the development of the National Organization for Women (NOW) formed in 1966. This organization fought for the removal of all legal and social barriers placed upon women to once again influence true equality between men and women. In 1972, women leaders such as Bella Abzug, Betty Friedan, and Gloria Steinem pushed the Equal Rights Amendment through Congress; however, it fell short of ratification by 1982.

== Equality feminist theory ==
Equality feminist theory is the extension of the equality of the male and female into theoretical and philosophical fields of thought. At its core, equality feminist theory advocates for the equal standing of both men and women in terms of desires, wants, goals, and achievement. Thus, from this viewpoint, the basis of human nature outside of culture is androgynous, neutral, and equal.

Much of equality feminism focuses on the relation of reason as the central tenet of both men and women equally. Mary Wollstonecraft in A Vindication on the Rights of Women (1792) claimed that women should enjoy the same legal and political rights as men on the grounds that they are human beings. Specifically, Wollstonecraft argues for "[a]sserting the rights which women in common with men ought to contend for". In this way, both men and women should have equal access to rights because they have an equal access to the capacity to reason. Similarly, The Subjection of Women (1869), John Stuart Mill advocated that society ought to be arranged according to reason and that 'accidents of birth' is irrelevant. Thus, because both men and women are governed by principles of reason, then the biological elements such as sex, gender, and race are not contributing factors to the essence of the individual. Mill notes that within a patriarchal society, "Men hold women in subjection by representing to them meekness, submissiveness resignation of all individual will into the hands of a man as an essential part of sexual attractiveness". In this way, to say that women have essential characteristics of submission by nature of their sex is an oppressive measure that contradicts the basic principle of reason that governs all human nature.

== Important figures ==
=== Mary Wollstonecraft ===
In 1792 Wollstonecraft wrote one of the earliest works in feminist philosophy and though she does not explicitly state that men and women are equal she does call for equality in various realms of life which set the stage for future equality feminist works. In her piece A Vindication of the Rights of Woman: with Strictures on Political and Moral Subjects, Wollstonecraft argues that women should have an education comparable to their position in society. She articulates her argument by claiming that since women were the primary care givers they could be able to better educate their own children and be seen as "companions" to the husband rather than wives if they were given this opportunity. Instead of being considered "property" that were exchanged through marriage, Wollstonecraft maintains that women are human beings and therefore deserve equal fundamental rights as men.

=== John Stuart Mill ===
In 1869, John Stuart Mill with the help of his wife Harriet Taylor Mill published The Subjection of Women, in it he argued for equality between the sexes. John Stuart Mill was able to draw off of some of the arguments his wife made in her essay The Enfranchisement of Women, in which she opened the door of favoring equality for both men and women. Mill believe that the moral and intellectual advancement from giving women the opportunity to be considered equal would translate to greater happiness for everyone involved. He believed that all humans had the capability of being educated and civilized, with which he argued women should be given the right to vote. Throughout the book Mill continues to argue that both men and women should be able to vote to defend their rights and be able to have the opportunity to stand on their own two feet morally and intellectually, and constantly used his position in Parliament to advocate for women's suffrage.

Mill attacks many of the arguments that women are inferior at certain activities and therefore be forbidden from doing them by saying that women are not given the opportunities and therefore we do not know what women are capable of. He claims that males are making an authoritative statement without evidence, an argument solely based on speculation. Mill claims that by giving women this opportunity to figure out exactly what they were capable of would double the mass of mental faculties to serve humanity, and could produce a great impact on human development.

=== Simone de Beauvoir ===
Simone de Beauvoir played a large role in equality feminism with the publishing of her book The Second Sex, broken into three parts. In the first part, "Destiny", de Beauvoir discusses the relationship of male to female in a variety of creatures before comparing human beings. This physiological data along with psychoanalytical data help her come to the conclusion that there was not a historical defeat of the female sex. Part two, "History", outlines the two factors in the evolution of women's condition: participation in production and freedom from reproductive slavery. In these chapters, de Beauvoir compares being a woman to being like an animal, similar to the way male animals dominated a female. Finally in part three, "Myths", de Beauvoir discusses the perceived "everlasting disappointment" of women from a male heterosexual point of view. She then comes back and discusses full reality of the situation to show the discrepancies between perception and reality. Throughout her literary career, de Beauvoir helped unravel some of the "myths" associated with perceptions in gender and set forth a strong message that men and women should be treated equal with equal rights.

=== Betty Friedan ===
Betty Friedan became one of the most recognized equality feminists after writing the book The Feminine Mystique, in which she discusses "the problem that has no name", female unhappiness in the 1950s and 1960s. It was through this book that Friedman was able to address many of the problems and the widespread recognition allowed her to later become president of the National Organization for Women (NOW).

Throughout the piece Friedan addressed the problem that women had "wanting more than a husband, children, and a home". Friedan discusses the societal expectations of raising children and how this caused many women to not be able to do what they wanted. Many decisions that were made for women were made by men and this had worn out many women. She discusses the problem of education and that many families solely focused on education for the male children and women were instead "assigned to be married to fulfill child-bearing expectations". It was through the impact of this piece of literature that women were finally given a voice to say it was okay to not want to conform to societal expectations and fight for equality of opportunities, choices, marriage, education, and voting.

== Objections ==
The main objection raised to equality feminism comes in the form of difference feminism, the belief that emphasizes the differences between men and women. This viewpoint, as championed by such feminists such as Carol Gilligan, Joan Tronto, Eva Feder Kittay, Genevieve Lloyd, Alison Jaggar, and Ynestra King, developed out of the rejection of the androgynous view of human nature as emphasized in equality feminism. Begun largely in the 1980s, this viewpoint makes the case that equality feminism fails to account for the uniquely female experience, and thus creates the male perspective as the dominant aspiration.

== See also ==
- Egalitarianism
- Equity feminism
- First wave feminism
- Gender equality
- Individualist feminism
- Liberal feminism
- Second wave feminism
