= Offenburg (electoral district) =

Federal electoral district of Germany

284 Offenburg
- Electoral district for the Bundestag
- Offenburg in 2025
- State: Baden-Württemberg
- Population: 278,400 (2019)
- Electorate: 204,663 (2025)
- Major settlements: Offenburg; Achern; Oberkirch
- Area: 1,094.4 km^{2}

Current electoral district
- Created: 1949
- Party: CDU
- member: Johannes Rothenberger
- Elected: 2025

Offenburg is an electoral constituency (German: Wahlkreis) represented in the Bundestag. It elects one member via first-past-the-post voting. Under the current constituency numbering system, it is designated as constituency 284. It is located in western Baden-Württemberg, comprising the northern part of the Ortenaukreis district.

Offenburg was created for the inaugural 1949 federal election. From 1972 until his death in 2023, it was represented by Wolfgang Schäuble of the Christian Democratic Union (CDU).

== Geography ==
Offenburg is located in western Baden-Württemberg. As of the 2021 federal election, it comprises the Ortenaukreis district excluding the municipalities of Ettenheim, Fischerbach, Friesenheim, Haslach im Kinzigtal, Hofstetten, Kappel-Grafenhausen, Kippenheim, Lahr/Schwarzwald, Mahlberg, Meißenheim, Mühlenbach, Ringsheim, Rust, Schuttertal, Schwanau, Seelbach, Steinach, Gutach (Schwarzwaldbahn), Hausach, Hornberg, Oberwolfach, and Wolfach.

== History ==
Offenburg was created in 1949. In the 1949 election, it was Baden constituency 6 in the numbering system. In the 1953 through 1961 elections, it was number 188. In the 1965 through 1976 elections, it was number 192. In the 1980 through 1998 elections, it was number 188. In the 2002 and 2005 elections, it was number 285. Since the 2009 election, it has been number 284.

Originally, the constituency comprised the districts of Offenburg, Lahr, and Kehl. It acquired its current borders in the 1980 election.

Election	No.	Name	Borders
1949	6	Offenburg	Offenburg district; Lahr district; Kehl district
1953	188	Offenburg	Offenburg district; Lahr district; Kehl district
1957	188	Offenburg	Offenburg district; Lahr district; Kehl district
1961	188	Offenburg	Offenburg district; Lahr district; Kehl district
1965	192	Offenburg	Offenburg district; Lahr district; Kehl district
1969	192	Offenburg	Offenburg district; Lahr district; Kehl district
1972	192	Offenburg	Offenburg district; Lahr district; Kehl district
1976	192	Offenburg	Offenburg district; Lahr district; Kehl district
1980	188	Offenburg	Ortenaukreis district (excluding Ettenheim, Fischerbach, Friesenheim, Haslach im Kinzigtal, Hofstetten, Kappel-Grafenhausen, Kippenheim, Lahr/Schwarzwald, Mahlberg, Meißenheim, Mühlenbach, Ringsheim, Rust, Schuttertal, Schwanau, Seelbach, Steinach, Gutach (Schwarzwaldbahn), Hausach, Hornberg, Oberwolfach, and Wolfach municipalities)
1983	188	Offenburg	Ortenaukreis district (excluding Ettenheim, Fischerbach, Friesenheim, Haslach im Kinzigtal, Hofstetten, Kappel-Grafenhausen, Kippenheim, Lahr/Schwarzwald, Mahlberg, Meißenheim, Mühlenbach, Ringsheim, Rust, Schuttertal, Schwanau, Seelbach, Steinach, Gutach (Schwarzwaldbahn), Hausach, Hornberg, Oberwolfach, and Wolfach municipalities)
1987	188	Offenburg	Ortenaukreis district (excluding Ettenheim, Fischerbach, Friesenheim, Haslach im Kinzigtal, Hofstetten, Kappel-Grafenhausen, Kippenheim, Lahr/Schwarzwald, Mahlberg, Meißenheim, Mühlenbach, Ringsheim, Rust, Schuttertal, Schwanau, Seelbach, Steinach, Gutach (Schwarzwaldbahn), Hausach, Hornberg, Oberwolfach, and Wolfach municipalities)
1990	188	Offenburg	Ortenaukreis district (excluding Ettenheim, Fischerbach, Friesenheim, Haslach im Kinzigtal, Hofstetten, Kappel-Grafenhausen, Kippenheim, Lahr/Schwarzwald, Mahlberg, Meißenheim, Mühlenbach, Ringsheim, Rust, Schuttertal, Schwanau, Seelbach, Steinach, Gutach (Schwarzwaldbahn), Hausach, Hornberg, Oberwolfach, and Wolfach municipalities)
1994	188	Offenburg	Ortenaukreis district (excluding Ettenheim, Fischerbach, Friesenheim, Haslach im Kinzigtal, Hofstetten, Kappel-Grafenhausen, Kippenheim, Lahr/Schwarzwald, Mahlberg, Meißenheim, Mühlenbach, Ringsheim, Rust, Schuttertal, Schwanau, Seelbach, Steinach, Gutach (Schwarzwaldbahn), Hausach, Hornberg, Oberwolfach, and Wolfach municipalities)
1998	188	Offenburg	Ortenaukreis district (excluding Ettenheim, Fischerbach, Friesenheim, Haslach im Kinzigtal, Hofstetten, Kappel-Grafenhausen, Kippenheim, Lahr/Schwarzwald, Mahlberg, Meißenheim, Mühlenbach, Ringsheim, Rust, Schuttertal, Schwanau, Seelbach, Steinach, Gutach (Schwarzwaldbahn), Hausach, Hornberg, Oberwolfach, and Wolfach municipalities)
2002	285	Offenburg	Ortenaukreis district (excluding Ettenheim, Fischerbach, Friesenheim, Haslach im Kinzigtal, Hofstetten, Kappel-Grafenhausen, Kippenheim, Lahr/Schwarzwald, Mahlberg, Meißenheim, Mühlenbach, Ringsheim, Rust, Schuttertal, Schwanau, Seelbach, Steinach, Gutach (Schwarzwaldbahn), Hausach, Hornberg, Oberwolfach, and Wolfach municipalities)
2005	285	Offenburg	Ortenaukreis district (excluding Ettenheim, Fischerbach, Friesenheim, Haslach im Kinzigtal, Hofstetten, Kappel-Grafenhausen, Kippenheim, Lahr/Schwarzwald, Mahlberg, Meißenheim, Mühlenbach, Ringsheim, Rust, Schuttertal, Schwanau, Seelbach, Steinach, Gutach (Schwarzwaldbahn), Hausach, Hornberg, Oberwolfach, and Wolfach municipalities)
2009	284	Offenburg	Ortenaukreis district (excluding Ettenheim, Fischerbach, Friesenheim, Haslach im Kinzigtal, Hofstetten, Kappel-Grafenhausen, Kippenheim, Lahr/Schwarzwald, Mahlberg, Meißenheim, Mühlenbach, Ringsheim, Rust, Schuttertal, Schwanau, Seelbach, Steinach, Gutach (Schwarzwaldbahn), Hausach, Hornberg, Oberwolfach, and Wolfach municipalities)
2013	284	Offenburg	Ortenaukreis district (excluding Ettenheim, Fischerbach, Friesenheim, Haslach im Kinzigtal, Hofstetten, Kappel-Grafenhausen, Kippenheim, Lahr/Schwarzwald, Mahlberg, Meißenheim, Mühlenbach, Ringsheim, Rust, Schuttertal, Schwanau, Seelbach, Steinach, Gutach (Schwarzwaldbahn), Hausach, Hornberg, Oberwolfach, and Wolfach municipalities)
2017	284	Offenburg	Ortenaukreis district (excluding Ettenheim, Fischerbach, Friesenheim, Haslach im Kinzigtal, Hofstetten, Kappel-Grafenhausen, Kippenheim, Lahr/Schwarzwald, Mahlberg, Meißenheim, Mühlenbach, Ringsheim, Rust, Schuttertal, Schwanau, Seelbach, Steinach, Gutach (Schwarzwaldbahn), Hausach, Hornberg, Oberwolfach, and Wolfach municipalities)
2021	284	Offenburg	Ortenaukreis district (excluding Ettenheim, Fischerbach, Friesenheim, Haslach im Kinzigtal, Hofstetten, Kappel-Grafenhausen, Kippenheim, Lahr/Schwarzwald, Mahlberg, Meißenheim, Mühlenbach, Ringsheim, Rust, Schuttertal, Schwanau, Seelbach, Steinach, Gutach (Schwarzwaldbahn), Hausach, Hornberg, Oberwolfach, and Wolfach municipalities)
2025	284	Offenburg	Ortenaukreis district (excluding Ettenheim, Fischerbach, Friesenheim, Haslach im Kinzigtal, Hofstetten, Kappel-Grafenhausen, Kippenheim, Lahr/Schwarzwald, Mahlberg, Meißenheim, Mühlenbach, Ringsheim, Rust, Schuttertal, Schwanau, Seelbach, Steinach, Gutach (Schwarzwaldbahn), Hausach, Hornberg, Oberwolfach, and Wolfach municipalities)

== Members ==
The constituency has been held continuously by Christian Democratic Union (CDU) since its creation. It was first represented by Oskar Rümmele from 1949 to 1957, followed by Hans Furler from 1957 to 1972. From 1972 until his death in 2023, it was represented by Wolfgang Schäuble. Schäuble served fourteen consecutive terms as its representative over the course of 51 years, making him the longest-serving parliamentarian in German history.

Election	Member	Party	%
1949	Oskar Rümmele	CDU	49.5
1953	Oskar Rümmele	CDU	58.9
1957	Hans Furler	CDU	58.5
1961	Hans Furler	CDU	52.9
1965	Hans Furler	CDU	56.8
1969	Hans Furler	CDU	56.9
1972	Wolfgang Schäuble	CDU	53.3
1976	Wolfgang Schäuble	CDU	55.3
1980	Wolfgang Schäuble	CDU	55.7
1983	Wolfgang Schäuble	CDU	62.4
1987	Wolfgang Schäuble	CDU	58.6
1990	Wolfgang Schäuble	CDU	64.3
1994	Wolfgang Schäuble	CDU	58.3
1998	Wolfgang Schäuble	CDU	52.6
2002	Wolfgang Schäuble	CDU	52.9
2005	Wolfgang Schäuble	CDU	50.5
2009	Wolfgang Schäuble	CDU	47.2
2013	Wolfgang Schäuble	CDU	56.0
2017	Wolfgang Schäuble	CDU	48.1
2021	Wolfgang Schäuble	CDU	34.9
2025	Johannes Rothenberger	CDU	38.2

== Election results ==
=== 2025 election ===
Federal election (2025): Offenburg
Notes:	Blue background denotes the winner of the electorate vote. Pink background denotes a candidate elected from their party list. Yellow background denotes an electorate win by a list member, or other incumbent. A ✓ or ✗ denotes status of any incumbent, win or lose respectively.						
Party	Candidate	Votes	%	±%	Party votes	%	±%
CDU	Johannes Rothenberger	63,491	38.2	▲3.3	56,002	33.6	▲7.7
AfD	Taras Maygutiak	34,411	20.7	▲11.8	36,359	21.8	▲11.9
SPD	Dirk Flacke	21,577	13.0	▼5.7	22,195	13.3	▼8.0
Greens	Dr. Ann-Margret Amui-Vedel	20,488	12.3	▼1.7	18,512	11.1	▼3.8
Left	Amelie Anouk Vollmer	8,988	5.4	▲2.7	9,490	5.7	▲2.8
FW	Adolf Huber	7,685	4.6	▼0.8	3,182	1.9	▼0.5
FDP	Martin Gaßner-Herz	7,405	4.5	▼6.3	8,781	5.3	▼9.4
BSW					7,523	4.5	
APT					1,564	0.9	▼0.5
Volt	Lukas Michael Klussmann	2,141	1.3		1,164	0.7	▲0.4
dieBasis					718	0.4	▼3.1
PARTEI					683	0.4	▼0.5
ÖDP					261	0.2	Steady
Bündnis C					183	0.1	Steady
BD					155	0.1	
MLPD					29	0.0	Steady
Informal votes		1,709			1,094		
Total valid votes		166,186			166,801		
Turnout		167,895	82.0	▲5.9			
CDU hold	Majority	29,080	17.5	▲1.3			

=== 2021 election ===
Federal election (2021): Offenburg
Notes:	Blue background denotes the winner of the electorate vote. Pink background denotes a candidate elected from their party list. Yellow background denotes an electorate win by a list member, or other incumbent. A ✓ or ✗ denotes status of any incumbent, win or lose respectively.						
Party	Candidate	Votes	%	±%	Party votes	%	±%
CDU	✓ Wolfgang Schäuble	54,148	34.9	▼13.2	40,210	25.9	▼11.2
SPD	Matthias Katsch	29,003	18.7	▲1.4	33,043	21.3	▲4.8
Greens	Thomas Zawalski	21,717	14.0	▲1.4	23,083	14.9	▲1.1
FDP	Martin Gaßner-Herz	16,692	10.8	▲4.5	22,799	14.7	▲3.7
AfD	Taras Maygutiak	13,876	8.9	▼1.4	15,320	9.9	▼1.7
dieBasis	Peter Cleiß	6,955	4.5		5,471	3.5	
FW	Adolf Huber	5,881	3.8		3,729	2.4	▲1.6
Left	Simon Bärmann	4,254	2.7	▼2.6	4,423	2.8	▼2.6
Tierschutzpartei					2,290	1.5	▲0.5
PARTEI	Cornelius Lötsch	2,627	1.7		1,465	0.9	▲0.3
Team Todenhöfer					867	0.6	
Pirates					580	0.4	0.0
Volt					441	0.3	
ÖDP					288	0.2	▼0.1
Bürgerbewegung					230	0.1	
Gesundheitsforschung					221	0.1	
Bündnis C					173	0.1	
NPD					146	0.1	▼0.1
DiB					139	0.1	0.0
Humanists					139	0.1	
Bündnis 21					62	0.0	
LKR					43	0.0	
MLPD					19	0.0	0.0
DKP					19	0.0	0.0
Informal votes		1,623			1,576		
Total valid votes		155,153			155,200		
Turnout		156,776	76.1	▲0.4			
CDU hold	Majority	25,145	16.2	▼14.6			

=== 2017 election ===
Federal election (2017): Offenburg
Notes:	Blue background denotes the winner of the electorate vote. Pink background denotes a candidate elected from their party list. Yellow background denotes an electorate win by a list member, or other incumbent. A ✓ or ✗ denotes status of any incumbent, win or lose respectively.						
Party	Candidate	Votes	%	±%	Party votes	%	±%
CDU	✓ Wolfgang Schäuble	73,935	48.1	▼7.9	57,033	37.1	▼11.2
SPD	Elvira Drobinski-Weiß	26,532	17.3	▼2.9	25,406	16.5	▼2.7
Greens	Norbert Großklaus	19,383	12.6	▲2.7	21,220	13.8	▲3.1
AfD	Taras Maygutiak	15,899	10.4	▲6.5	17,800	11.6	▲6.2
FDP	Trutz-Ulrich Stephani	9,593	6.2	▲4.1	16,940	11.0	▲5.3
Left	Karin Binder	8,264	5.4	▲1.1	8,411	5.5	▲0.7
Tierschutzpartei					1,449	0.9	▲0.1
FW					1,301	0.8	▲0.3
PARTEI					959	0.6	
Pirates					651	0.4	▼1.7
Tierschutzallianz					395	0.3	
ÖDP					380	0.2	0.0
NPD					358	0.2	▼0.7
DM					342	0.2	
V-Partei³					247	0.2	
BGE					239	0.2	
Menschliche Welt					233	0.2	
DiB					174	0.1	
DIE RECHTE					49	0.0	
MLPD					35	0.0	0.0
DKP					27	0.0	
Informal votes		2,118			2,075		
Total valid votes		153,606			153,649		
Turnout		155,724	75.8	▲4.9			
CDU hold	Majority	47,403	30.8	▼5.0			

=== 2013 election ===
Federal election (2013): Offenburg
Notes:	Blue background denotes the winner of the electorate vote. Pink background denotes a candidate elected from their party list. Yellow background denotes an electorate win by a list member, or other incumbent. A ✓ or ✗ denotes status of any incumbent, win or lose respectively.						
Party	Candidate	Votes	%	±%	Party votes	%	±%
CDU	✓ Wolfgang Schäuble	80,083	56.1	▲8.9	68,973	48.3	▲10.7
SPD	Elvira Drobinski-Weiß	28,862	20.2	▲0.7	27,448	19.2	▲1.4
Greens	Ludwig Kornmeier	14,111	9.9	▼2.7	15,311	10.7	▼2.4
Left	Lars Stern	6,083	4.3	▼3.1	6,762	4.7	▼3.0
AfD	Helmut Schneider	5,563	3.9		7,743	5.4	
FDP	Jan Sachs	3,063	2.1	▼9.0	8,140	5.7	▼12.2
Pirates	Norbert Hense	2,836	2.0		3,028	2.1	▲0.2
NPD	Werner-Christian Wöhrle	1,471	1.0	▼0.5	1,318	0.9	▼0.2
Tierschutzpartei					1,244	0.9	▲0.2
FW	Justus Wingert	801	0.6		852	0.6	
ÖDP					350	0.2	▼0.1
REP					334	0.2	▼0.4
Volksabstimmung					332	0.2	▼0.1
RENTNER					311	0.2	
Party of Reason					309	0.2	
PBC					218	0.2	▼0.2
PRO					79	0.1	
MLPD					32	0.0	0.0
BIG					24	0.0	
BüSo					14	0.0	0.0
Informal votes		2,386			2,437		
Total valid votes		142,873			142,822		
Turnout		145,259	70.8	▲1.5			
CDU hold	Majority	21,221	35.9	▲8.2			

=== 2009 election ===
Federal election (2009): Offenburg
Notes:	Blue background denotes the winner of the electorate vote. Pink background denotes a candidate elected from their party list. Yellow background denotes an electorate win by a list member, or other incumbent. A ✓ or ✗ denotes status of any incumbent, win or lose respectively.						
Party	Candidate	Votes	%	±%	Party votes	%	±%
CDU	✓ Wolfgang Schäuble	65,336	47.2	▼3.3	52,083	37.6	▼3.6
SPD	Elvira Drobinski-Weiß	27,052	19.5	▼11.6	24,662	17.8	▼11.5
Greens	Thomas Marwein	17,460	12.6	▲5.6	18,247	13.2	▲3.4
FDP	Sibylle Laurischk	15,454	11.2	▲6.1	24,887	17.9	▲6.6
Left	Andreas Kirchgeßner	10,129	7.3	▲3.4	10,742	7.7	▲3.4
Pirates					2,605	1.9	
NPD	Jens Keppler	2,069	1.5	▼0.2	1,506	1.1	▼0.2
Tierschutzpartei					974	0.7	
REP					914	0.7	▼0.3
Independent	Norbert Hense	594	0.4				
Volksabstimmung					453	0.3	
PBC					444	0.3	▼0.2
ÖDP					430	0.3	
DIE VIOLETTEN					417	0.3	
Independent	Wilhelm Sälinger	264	0.2				
Independent	Michael Eckert	172	0.1				
DVU					97	0.1	
ADM					93	0.1	
BüSo					75	0.1	0.0
MLPD					42	0.0	0.0
Informal votes		3,305			3,164		
Total valid votes		138,530			138,671		
Turnout		141,835	69.3	▼6.1			
CDU hold	Majority	38,284	27.7	▲8.3			

=== 2005 election ===
Federal election (2005):Offenburg
Notes:	Blue background denotes the winner of the electorate vote. Pink background denotes a candidate elected from their party list. Yellow background denotes an electorate win by a list member, or other incumbent. A ✓ or ✗ denotes status of any incumbent, win or lose respectively.						
Party	Candidate	Votes	%	±%	Party votes	%	±%
CDU	✓ Wolfgang Schäuble	74,953	50.5	▼2.4	61,181	41.2	▼4.7
SPD	Elvira Drobinski-Weiß	46,271	31.2	▼2.1	43,430	29.2	▼3.3
Greens	Thomas Marwein	10,415	7.0	▲0.6	14,479	9.7	▲0.3
FDP	Sibylle Laurischk	7,552	5.1	▲0.1	16,864	11.4	▲4.1
Left	Dorothee Diehm	5,834	3.9	▲3.1	6,398	4.3	▲3.5
NPD	Axel Borkmann	2,487	1.7		1,896	1.3	▲1.0
REP					1,572	1.0	▼0.1
Familie					1,362	0.9	
PBC	David Krumbacher	949	0.6	▼0.2	701	0.5	▲0.1
GRAUEN					593	0.4	▲0.3
BüSo					94	0.1	0.0
MLPD					73	0.0	
Informal votes		3,447			3,365		
Total valid votes		148,461			148,543		
Turnout		151,908	75.4	▼3.4			
CDU hold	Majority	28,682	19.3				
