= Martin Gassner-Herz =

German politician (born 1985)

Member of the Bundestag
- In office German Bundestag in 2021 – German Bundestag in 2025

Personal details
- Born: 16 May 1985 (age 41)
- Party: Free Democratic Party

Martin Gassner-Herz (born 16 May 1985 in Tuttlingen) is a German politician for the Free Democratic Party (FDP) and since 2021 member of the Bundestag, the federal diet.

== Life ==
Gassner-Herz was born in the West German town of Tuttlingen. He is married and lives in Schutterwald.

== Education and career ==
In 2004, Gassner-Herz graduated from Otto-Hahn-Gymnasium in Tuttlingen. He then studied political and administrative science at the University of Konstanz. He completed his studies in 2007 with a Bachelor of Arts in Political and Administrative Science. He then studied political science at the Philipps University of Marburg until 2010, graduating with a Master of Arts in Political Science. From 2010 to 2012, he was a research assistant in the constituency office of Sibylle Laurischk, who was a member of the Bundestag at the time. He then did his voluntary military service until 2013. He was then Managing Partner of Deutsche Megaphon GbR until 2014. Since then, he has worked as an administrative employee in the social services department of the Ortenau district office.

== Political activities ==
From 2000 to 2020, Gassner-Herz was a member of the Young Liberals. He has been a member of the FDP since 2003 and has held various board positions in the Offenburg-Ried local association, the Ortenau district association and the South Baden district association. From 2019 to 2021, he was a member of the Baden-Württemberg FDP state executive.

Gassner-Herz was elected to the Bundestag in 2021. He came fourth in the Offenburg constituency with 10.8% of the first votes, missing out on the direct mandate. However, he entered the German Bundestag in 16th place on his party's Baden-Württemberg state list.
