= Individualist feminism =

Libertarian feminist movement

Individualist feminism, also known as ifeminism, is a libertarian feminist movement that emphasizes individualism, personal autonomy, freedom from state-sanctioned discrimination against women, and gender equality.

== Overview ==
Individualist feminists attempt to change legal systems to eliminate sex and gender privileges, and to ensure that individuals have equal rights. Individualist feminism encourages women to take full responsibility for their own lives and opposes any government interference into choices adults make with their own bodies.

Individualist or libertarian feminism is sometimes grouped as one of many branches of liberal feminism, but it tends to diverge significantly from the mainstream liberal feminism of the 21st century. Individualist feminists Wendy McElroy and Christina Hoff Sommers define individualist feminism in opposition to what they call "political" or "gender feminism". In Europe, individual feminism is more open to the tenets of queer theory and gender mainstreaming. The German individual feminist Mirna Funk separates her feminism from the political mainstream current (she refers to this as "Reihenhausfeminismus"; in English, "row house feminism"), as she emphasizes women's individual responsibility and rejects victimization on one hand, while proclaiming a feminist capitalism on the other, which is criticized by other feminists as "Girlboss feminism".

== Beliefs ==
Libertarian feminists reject gender roles that limit women's autonomy and choice, and assert that strict gender roles limit both women and men, especially if they are legally enforced. Libertarian feminists are critical of using institutional power to achieve positive aims, believing that allowing the government to make decisions on behalf of women may limit women's individual choices. For instance, banning sex work to "protect" women treats women as a monolithic group, rather than individuals, and takes away economic opportunities for women who want to work in the sex industry by choice.

The Cato Institute, an American libertarian think tank, argues that capitalism has given women a higher standard of living, greater access to resources, greater individual freedoms and more job opportunities outside of physical labor.

Individualist feminism conforms to the theory of natural law, supporting laws that protect the rights of men and women equally. Individual feminists argue that government should not prioritize the needs of women over men, nor should it strive to intervene to create equality in personal relationships, private economic arrangements, entertainment and media representation, or the general sociocultural realm.

== History in the United States ==
According to individualist feminist Joan Kennedy Taylor, early organized feminism in the United States was fundamentally "a classical liberal women's movement". First-wave feminists focused on universal suffrage and the abolition of slavery, along with property rights for women and other forms of equal rights.

During the Victorian era and the early 20th century, individualist feminism fell out of vogue in the US and UK as the progressive, labor, and socialist movements began to hold more sway over politics.

Individualist feminism was revived by anti-authoritarian and individualist second-wave feminists in the mid-20th century. According to Taylor, "the political issues that gained wide adherence were the reproductive rights to birth control and abortion, and the Equal Rights Amendment, which (at least in its initial support) was a classical liberal restraint on government."

Labels like individualist feminism, libertarian feminism, and classical liberal feminism were explicitly embraced by late 20th century writers and activists such as Taylor, Sharon Presley, Tonie Nathan, and Wendy McElroy. Modern libertarian feminism is a continuation of ideas and work developed by these women and their contemporaries, including Nadine Strossen and Camille Paglia, as well as of the ideas of classical liberal and anarchist writers throughout history.

=== Denmark ===
Logo of the classic liberal Liberal Alliance

Feminism in Denmark is characterised by a broad societal consensus, with most political parties advocating some form of feminist ideology. The Liberal Alliance, known as the political home of classical liberalism and libertarianism, also serves as a key platform for individualist feminism.

Nikita Klaestrup has become the most prominent face of individualist feminism in Denmark. She first rose to national prominence during the 2013 local elections, when the Danish tabloid press gave her widespread attention. The unusual combination of her political work and her career as a model drew significant media interest. The newspaper Ekstra Bladet named her the "Election Babe of the Year". In 2015, she garnered further attention when she attended a celebration marking the 110th anniversary of the youth wing of the Conservative People's Party, wearing a strikingly revealing dress with a deep neckline.

Klaestrup's bold appearance sparked some criticism, with detractors accusing her of relying more on provocation than on political substance. One critic even remarked that Klaestrup was "all breasts, not politics". Klaestrup responded confidently to this, stating that she represents the "final stage of feminism", where women are free to do whatever they choose.

=== Egypt ===
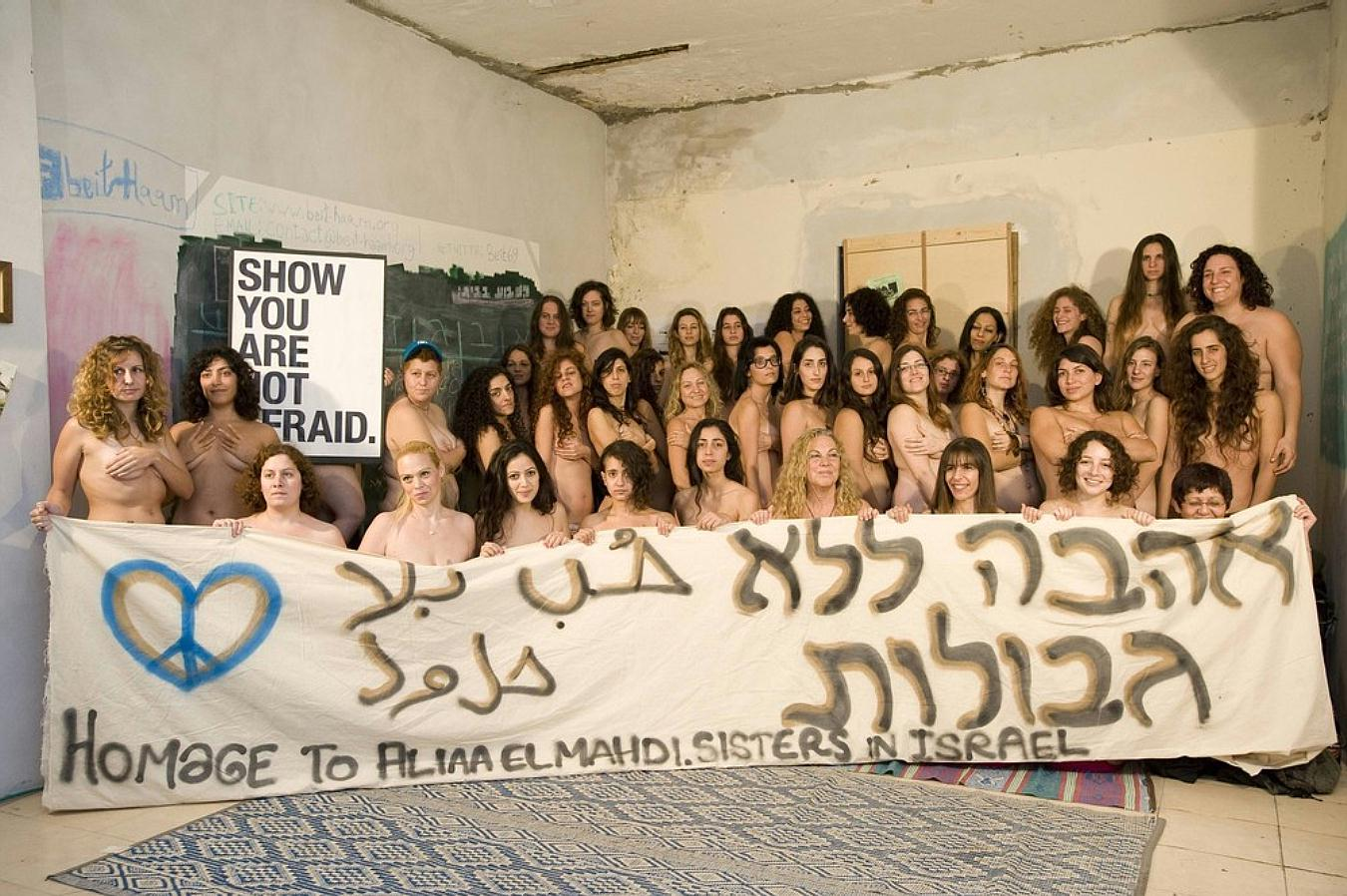
Israeli women declaring solidarity with Elmahdy

In Egypt, the societal structure is dominated by a strict gender order, making feminism a marginal movement focused on securing basic rights for women. Feminism in Egypt bears resemblance to the first wave of feminism in the West, where the struggle revolves around fundamental freedoms. This environment has led to the prominence of individualist feminism, with figures like Aliaa Magda Elmahdy standing out.

Elmahdy gained widespread attention after posting a nude photograph on her Blogspot page, which she described as a "scream against a society of violence, racism, sexism, sexual harassment, and hypocrisy." Her bold actions led to numerous death threats. Elmahdy identifies as a secular, liberal, feminist, vegetarian, individualist, and has been an atheist since the age of 16.

In 2011, Elmahdy and fellow activist Kareem Amer were stopped by security while walking in a public park, showing affection by linking arms and kissing. After a confrontation with the park's managers, they were expelled, with footage of the incident later posted online.

Elmahdy's nude photo, posted on 23 October 2011, was reportedly taken in her parents' home months before meeting Amer, as stated in a tweet. Her actions have sparked significant controversy, but they also highlight the struggles and boldness of individualist feminists in Egypt's conservative society.

=== Germany ===

The first feminist efforts outside the left-wing spectrum come from the neoliberal or classical liberal FDP (Free Democratic Party) in Germany. The party made initial attempts at promoting women in the 1970s, leading to the establishment of the party-affiliated feminist organization, Liberal Women, in 1990. This organization strives to promote women as individuals in line with the party's philosophy, thereby distinguishing itself from left-wing feminisms.

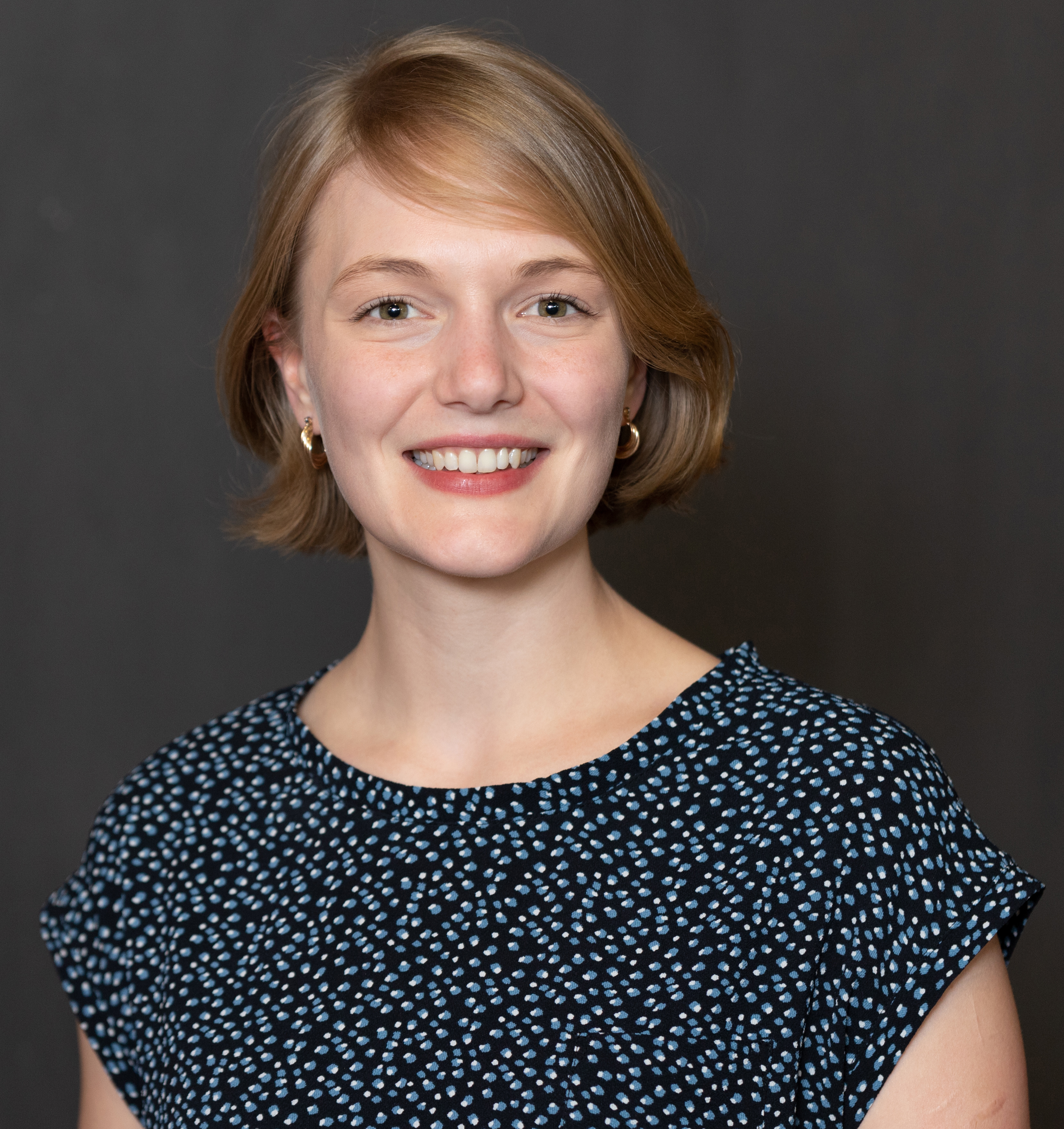
Ria Schröder, leading figure of the individualist Female Future Forum

As the Liberal Women are relatively small compared to the overall party, efforts to promote individual feminism within the party were particularly driven by members of the Young Liberals. Alongside the "Federal Working Group of Liberal Feminism," (Bundesarbeitskreis Liberaler Feminismus) there exists the Female Future Forum, led by the young politician Ria Schröder. Consequently, there were early structures within the party where individual feminism could develop.

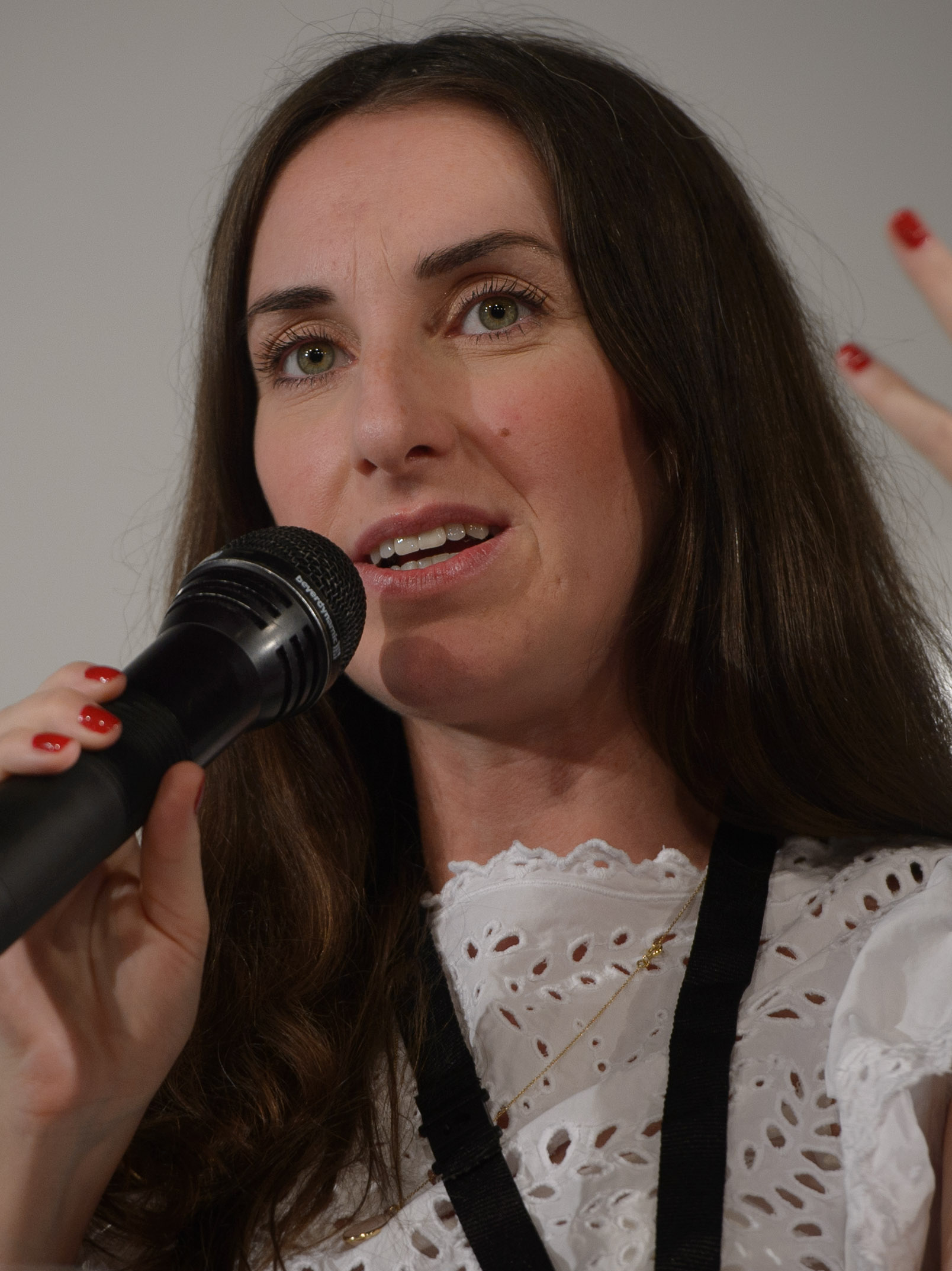
Mirna Funk (2015)

The contributions of individual feminist intellectuals in Germany only began to emerge in the 2020s. Here, a clear difference is apparent compared to the USA, where individual feminism has aligned more closely with anti-feminist structures. In contrast, individual feminist activists and intellectuals in Germany are more firmly rooted within the broader feminist structures, making it a recognized feminist movement. In 2022, the German-Jewish writer and journalist Mirna Funk wrote the first German individual feminist manifesto with her book "Who Cares! Von der Freiheit, Frau zu sein" ("Who Cares! On the Freedom to Be a Woman"). In this work, she emphasizes women's individual responsibility and their ability to make personal choices within capitalism while critiquing left-wing feminisms.

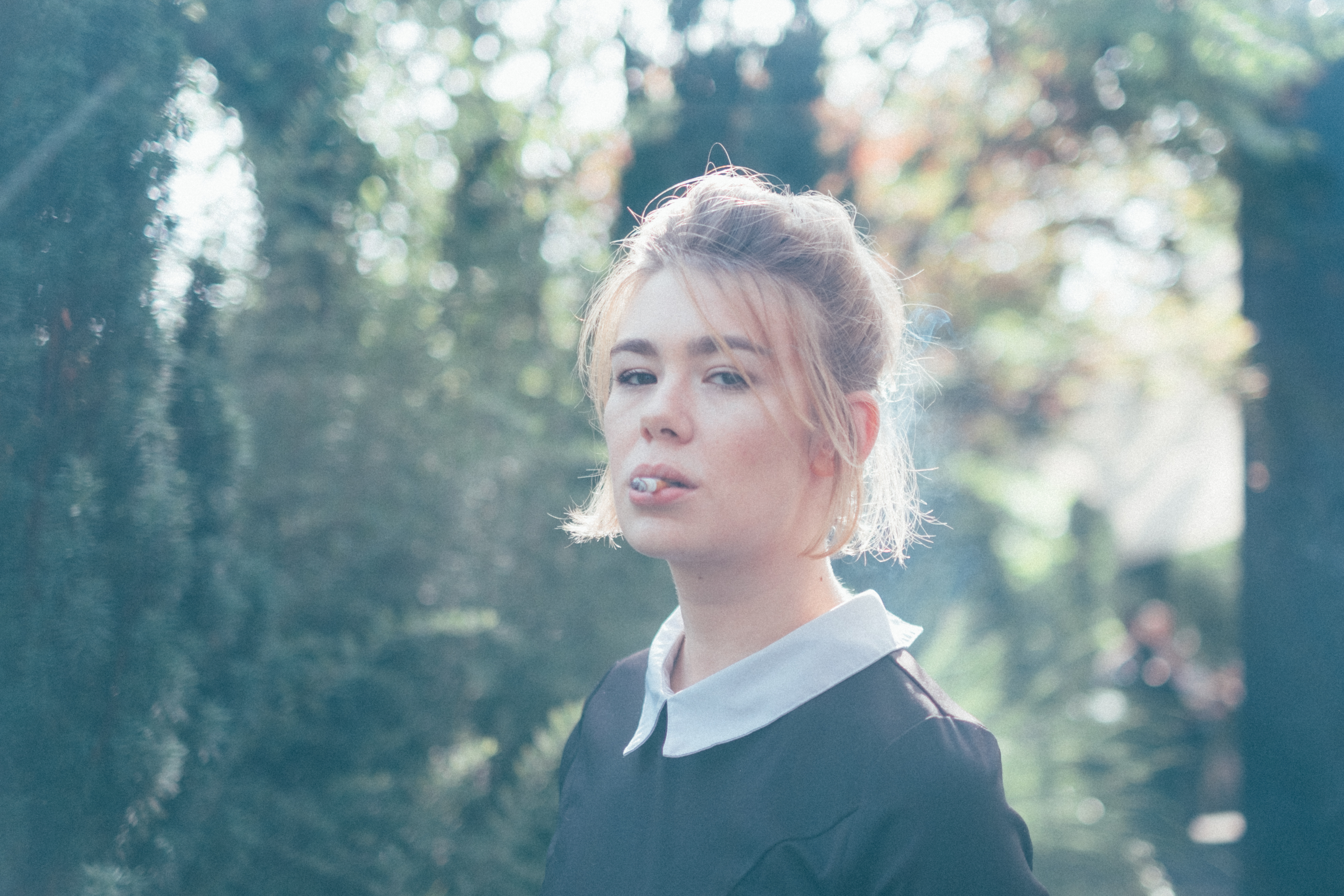
Ronja von Rönne (2018)

The German writer, journalist, and presenter Ronja von Rönne expressed decidedly anti-feminist views in a polemical article published in the German populist-liberal magazine "Die Welt" in 2015, titled "Why Feminism Disgusts Me." She wrote, "I am not a feminist, I am an egoist. I don't know if 'one' needs feminism in Germany in 2015, I don't need it. It rather disgusts me. Feminism sounds to me as antiquated as the word 'tape jam'." Consequently, she was seen as a German icon of anti-feminism, although she did not want to be labeled as such, feeling that she was being wrongly appropriated. She stated that it was polemical and a spontaneous rant, rather than an anti-feminist contribution. In her book "Trotz" ("Defiance"), published in 2023, she reconciles with feminism and identifies herself as an individual feminist.

Other individual feminists worth mentioning include Janin Ullmann with her Female Finance podcast focusing on women's finances, and Annahita Esmailzadeh with her book "Von Quotenfrauen und alten weißen Männern" ("Of Quota Women and Old White Men"). Additionally, there are left-leaning, social-liberal feminists who seek to enrich the movement with individualistic positions, such as Paulita Pappel, Nadine Primo, and Marie von den Benken.

=== Sweden ===
Logo of the Swedish Liberals

Sweden is globally recognized as a leading nation in matters of gender equality and feminism, with a broad range of feminist organisations shaping the landscape.

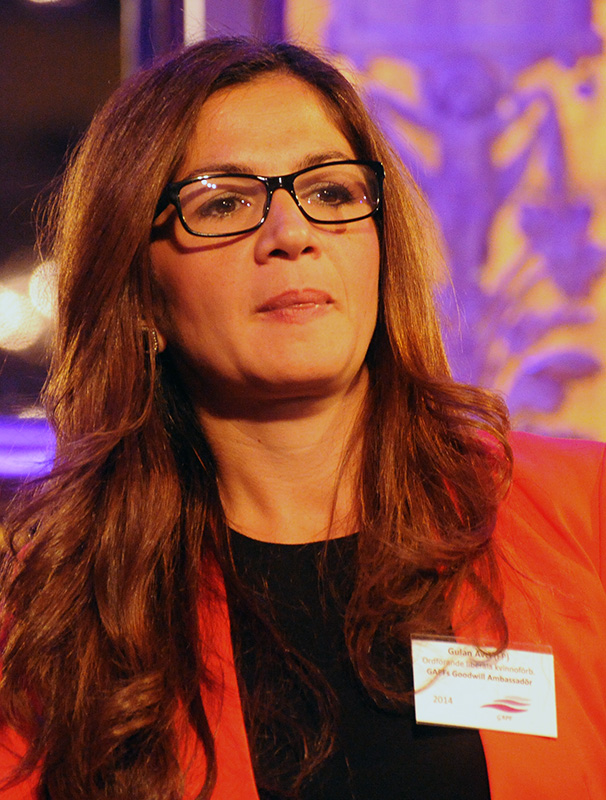
Gulan Avci

Classical liberalism in Sweden finds its home in the party Liberalerna, and its feminist wing, Liberala Kvinnor, is the primary organisation representing individualist feminism in the country. This group has existed since 1936, with its roots tracing back to predecessor movements starting in 1914.

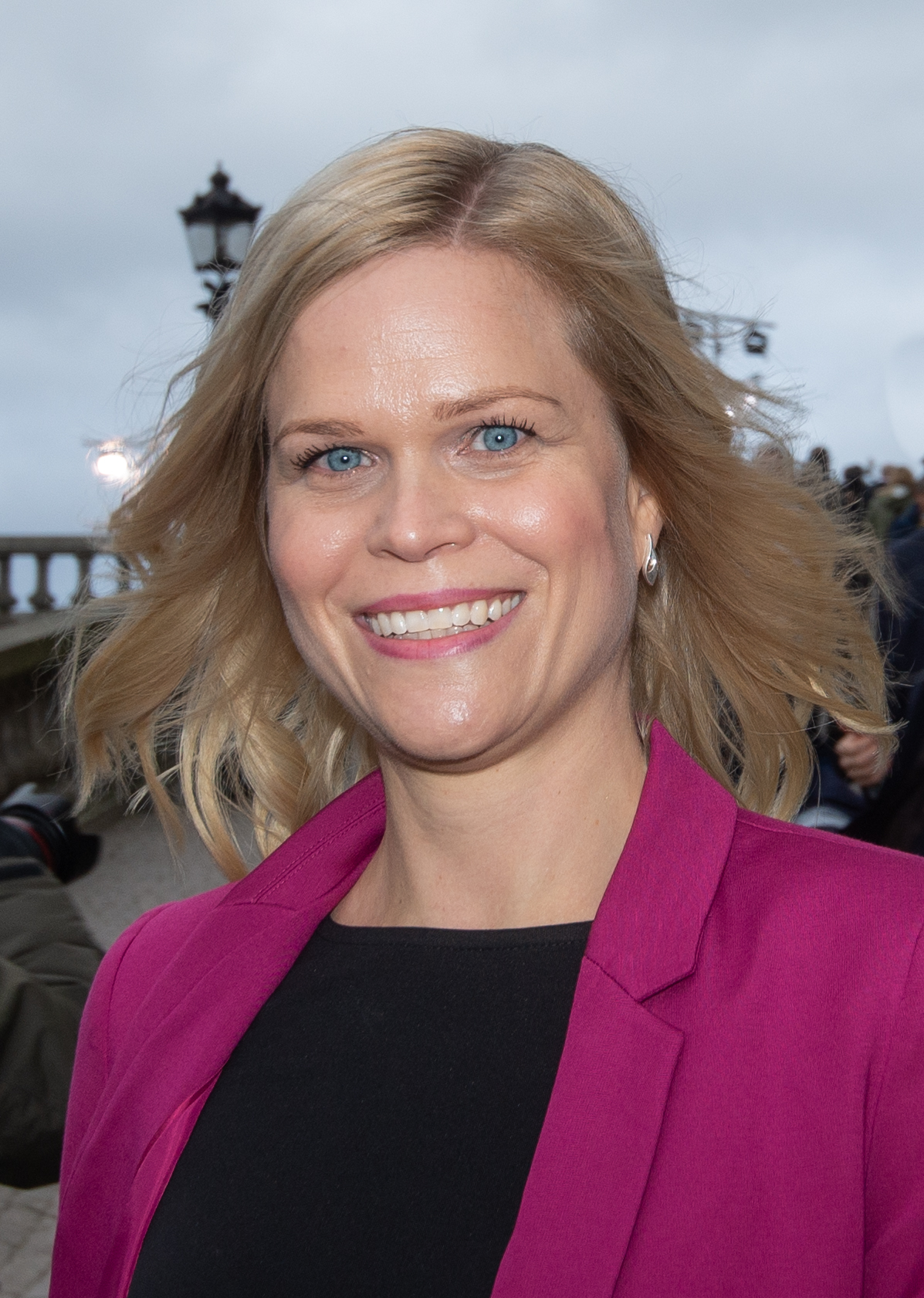
Paulina Brandberg

Prominent figures in Swedish individualist feminism include Gulan Avci and Cecilia Elving, the current chairpersons of the organisation. Individualist feminism also has a strong presence in the Swedish government. Notable self-declared individualist feminists in the administration include Minister for Gender Equality Paulina Brandberg and Minister for Climate and the Environment Romina Pourmokhtari.

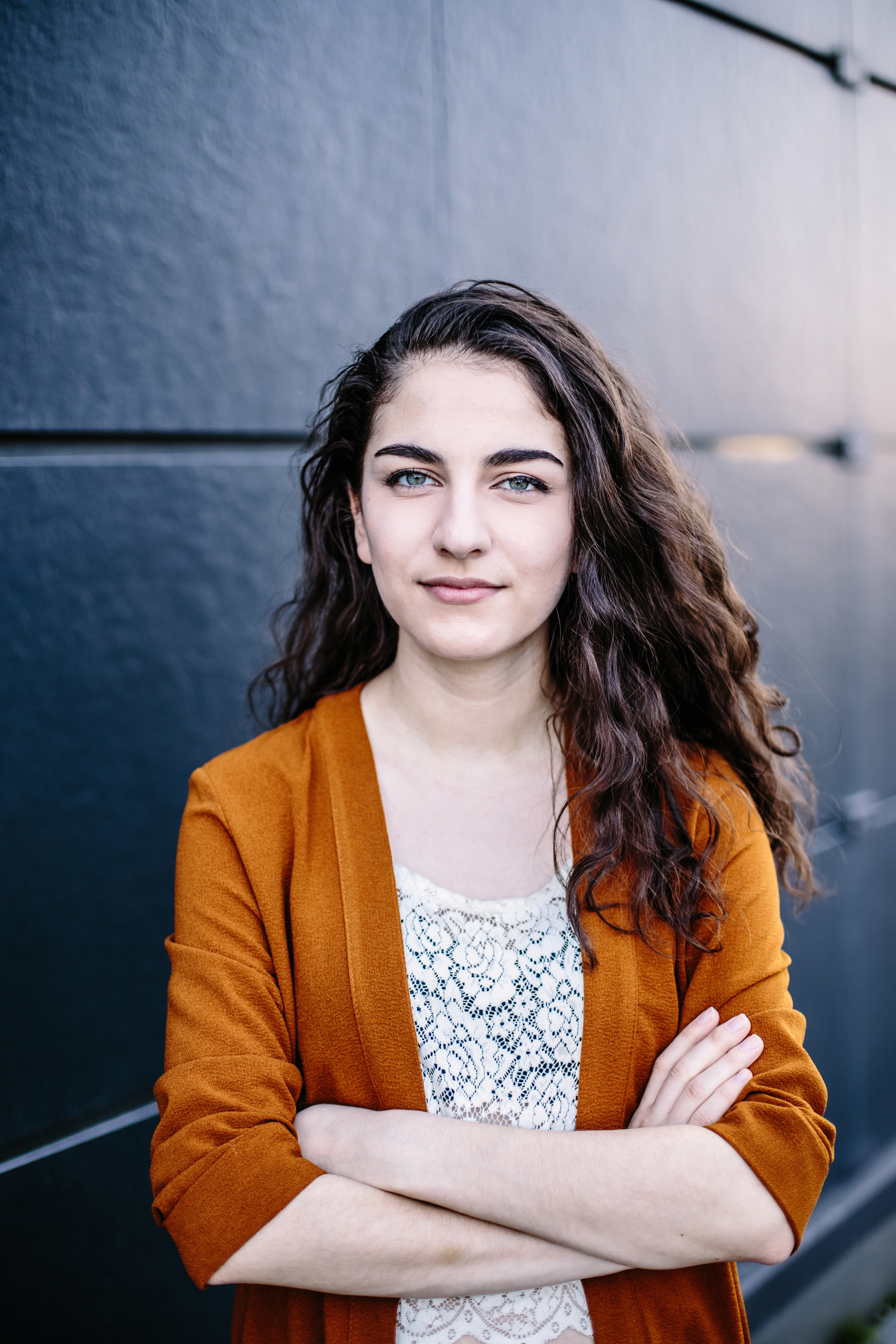
Romina Pourmokhtari

Sweden's approach to feminism, particularly in its individualist form, exemplifies a robust commitment to personal freedom and equality within a highly progressive political framework.

== Libertarian feminist organizations ==
=== Association of Libertarian Feminists ===
The Association of Libertarian Feminists (ALF) was founded in 1973 by Tonie Nathan and Sharon Presley on Ayn Rand's birthday in Eugene, Oregon, at Nathan's home. In September 1975 in New York City, ALF became a national organization. As of 2015, Presley was the executive director of the organization.

The ALF has stated that their purpose is to oppose sexist attitudes, oppose government, and "provide a libertarian alternative to those aspects of the women's movement that tend to discourage independence and individuality." The ALF have opposed the government's involvement in childcare centers, including "zoning laws, unnecessary and pointless "health and safety" restrictions, [and] required licensing." The ALF have also opposed public education, saying that public schools "not only foster the worst of traditionalist sexist values but inculcate docility and obedience to authority with sterile, stifling methods and compulsory programs and regulations." In 1977, Nathan suggested eliminating parts of the United States Postal Service regulations that obstructed the mailing of birth control samples and information about family planning at the National Women's Conference in Houston, Texas.

=== Feminists for Liberty ===
Feminists for Liberty (F4L) is a nonprofit libertarian feminist group founded in 2016. It was founded by Kat Murti and Elizabeth Nolan Brown to promote the values of libertarian feminism. F4L are "anti-sexism and anti-statism, pro-markets and pro-choice" and "classically liberal, anti-carceral, and sex positive". They are opposed to collectivism and argue that "treating someone as simply a representative of their sex or gender" is collectivist.

=== Ladies of Liberty Alliance (LOLA) ===
The Ladies of Liberty Alliance (LOLA) was established in 2009 as a nonprofit organization. LOLA's goal is to engage women in libertarianism through social groups, leadership trainings, and visits from guest speakers.

=== Mothers Institute ===
The Mothers Institute was a non-profit educational and networking organization supporting stay-at-home mothering, homeschooling, civics in the classroom, and an effective networking system for mothers and freedom of choice in health and happiness. It is now defunct.

== Criticism ==
Criticism of individualist feminism ranges from expressing disagreements with the values of individualism as a feminist to expressing the limitations within individualist feminism as an effective activism. Critics have argued that individualist feminism does not sufficiently address structural inequality. In 1995, American radical feminist Catharine MacKinnon criticized the value of individual choice, saying there were still instances where "women are used, abused, bought, sold, and silenced", especially women of color. In 1999, American feminist Susan Brownmiller suggested that the aversion to collective, "united" feminism was a sign of a "waning" and unhealthy feminist movement.

== Notable individualist feminists ==
- William Lloyd Garrison (1805–1879)
- Ezra Heywood (1829–1893)
- Moses Harman (1830–1910)
- Voltairine de Cleyre (1866–1912)
- Dora Marsden (1882–1960)
- Suzanne La Follette (1893–1983)
- Tonie Nathan (1923–2014)
- Joan Kennedy Taylor (1926–2005)
- Mimi Reisel Gladstein (b. 1936)
- Sharon Presley (1943–2022)
- Camille Paglia (b. 1947)
- Wendy Kaminer (b. 1949)
- Candida Royalle (1950–2015)
- Christina Hoff Sommers (b. 1950)
- Wendy McElroy (b. 1951)
- Nina Hartley (b. 1959)
- Virginia Postrel (b. 1960)
- Cathy Young (b. 1963)
- Tiffany Million (b. 1966)
- Gulan Avci (b. 1977)
- Mirna Funk (b. 1981)
- Janin Ullmann (b. 1981)
- Paulina Brandberg (b. 1983)
- Lily Wu (b. 1984)
- Ria Schröder (b. 1992)
- Nikita Klæstrup (b. 1994)
- Romina Pourmokhtari (b. 1995)

== See also ==
- Anarcha-feminism
- Cultural liberalism / radicalism
- Equity feminism
- Female entrepreneur
- Feminist anthropology
- Feminist economics
- Feminist existentialism
- Feminist political theory and ecology
- Individualist anarchism
- Left-libertarianism
- Liberal feminism
- Libertarian perspectives on abortion
- List of conservative feminisms
- Sex-positive feminism
- Women's property rights
