= Oskar Rümmele =

German politician

Member of the Bundestag; for Offenburg
- In office 7 September 1949 – 6 October 1957
- Preceded by: Constituency established
- Succeeded by: Hans Furler

Personal details
- Born: 6 May 1899 Hausen im Wiesental, Germany
- Died: 29 June 1975 (aged 85) Waldkirch, West Germany
- Party: Christian Democratic Union

Oskar Rümmele (6 May 1890 – 29 June 1975) was a German politician of the Christian Democratic Union (CDU) and former member of the German Bundestag.

== Career ==
Rümmele had been a member of the German Bundestag since its first election from 1949 to 1957. He represented the constituency of Offenburg in parliament as a directly elected member. In the first legislative period, he was deputy chairman of the Bundestag's Committee on Transportation and in the second (1953 to 1957) its chairman.

== Literature ==
Herbst, Ludolf; Jahn, Bruno (2002). Vierhaus, Rudolf (ed.). Biographisches Handbuch der Mitglieder des Deutschen Bundestages. 1949–2002 [Biographical Handbook of the Members of the German Bundestag. 1949–2002] (in German). München: De Gruyter - De Gruyter Saur. p. 1715. ISBN 978-3-11-184511-1.
