= Marcel Schröder =

German politician (born 1995)

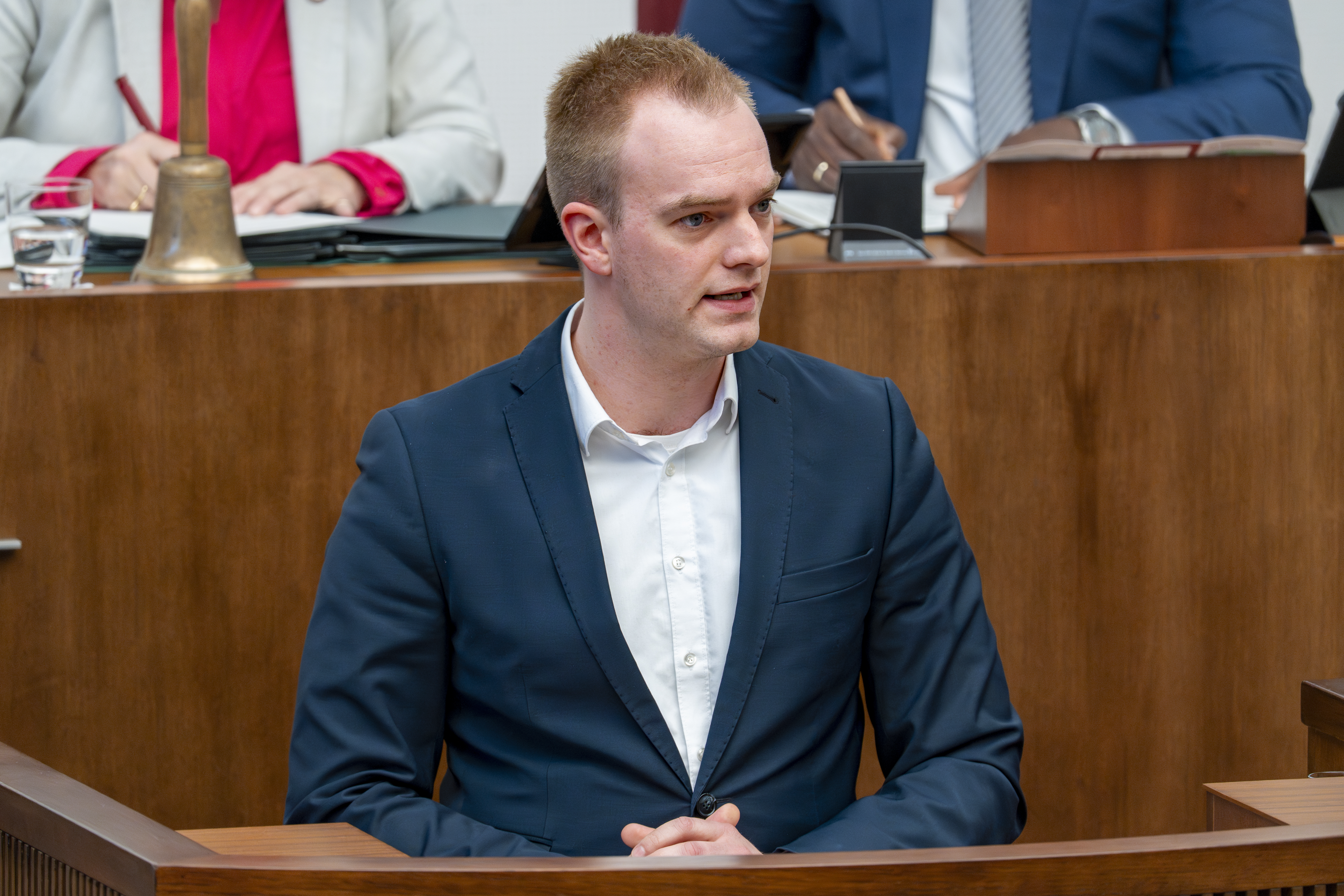
- Schröder in 2025

Member of the Bürgerschaft of Bremen
- Incumbent
- Assumed office 29 June 2023

Personal details
- Born: 13 July 1995 (age 30) Wesel
- Party: Free Democratic Party (since 2018)

Marcel Schröder (born 13 July 1995 in Wesel) is a German politician serving as a member of the Bürgerschaft of Bremen since 2023. From 2020 to 2021, he served as chairman of the Young Liberals in Bremen.
