= Ria Schröder =

German politician (born 1992)

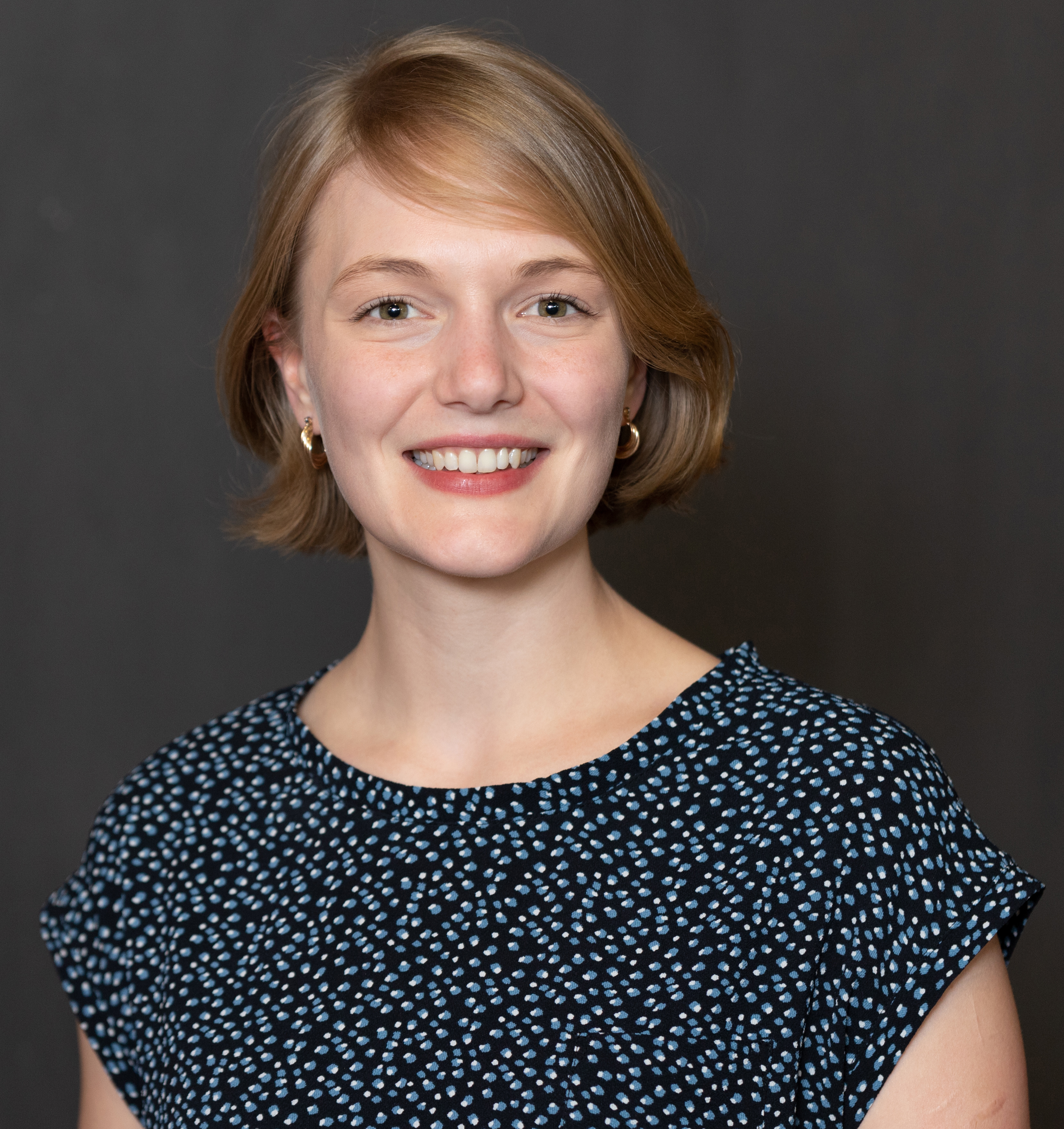

Member of the Bundestag
- In office 2021–2025

Personal details
- Born: 7 March 1992 (age 34) Boppard, Germany
- Party: Free Democratic Party (FDP)
- Education: Bucerius Law School
- Website: riaschroeder.de

Ria Schröder (born 7 March 1992) is a German politician of the Free Democratic Party (FDP) who served as a member of the Bundestag from 2021 to 2025.

Schröder was the federal chairwoman of the FDP-affiliated youth organization Young Liberals (Junge Liberale) from 2018 to 2020. Since 2019, she has been an assessor on the federal executive committee of the FDP.

== Early life and education ==
From 2010, Schröder studied law at Bucerius Law School in Hamburg, graduating with the first state exam in 2016. Since 2016, she has been studying art history and Italian at the University of Hamburg and working at a Hamburg law firm.

== Political career ==
Schröder has been a member of the Hamburg state executive committee of the FDP since 2014, a member of the federal executive committee of the Young Liberals since 2015 and became federal chairwoman of the FDP-affiliated youth association on 27 April 2018. She prevailed over an opposing candidate at the 56th federal congress of the Young Liberals in Gütersloh with 58.08 percent of the votes cast. Schröder succeeded Konstantin Kuhle, who did not stand for re-election as chairman following his election to the German Bundestag. Previously, she was deputy state chair for organization of the Young Liberals Hamburg from 2014 to 2016, as well as first assessor and later deputy federal chair for organization in the federal executive committee. At the 2019 federal congress, she was re-elected with 56.6 percent without opposing candidates. After Schröder announced that she would not run again after two years as federal chairwoman of the Young Liberals, Jens Teutrine was elected as her successor at the federal congress in August 2020 in Bielefeld.

For the 2017 federal election, Schröder stood for the FDP in 4th place on the state list in Hamburg led by Katja Suding. In addition, she prevailed within the party with her application for the direct candidacy for the FDP in the constituency of Hamburg-Eimsbüttel against Burkhardt Müller-Sönksen, who had been a member of the German Bundestag until 2013. However, she failed to enter the Bundestag. For the election to the Hamburg Parliament 2020 Schröder was elected to place 7 of the state list of the FDP Hamburg. However, she did not succeed as the FDP did not pass the necessary 5 percent hurdle.

=== Member of the German Parliament, 2021–2025 ===
For the 2021 federal election, Schröder applied for place 1 of the Hamburg state list of the FDP. She could not prevail against a total of three other candidates and was subsequently elected to list position 2 and was voted into the Bundestag.

In the 20th German Bundestag, Schröder served as her parliamentary group's spokesperson on education policy. She was a member of the Committee for Education, Research and Technology Assessment.

In addition to her committee assignments, Schröder was part of the German Parliamentary Friendship Group for Relations with the States of South Asia.

== Other activities ==
- Association of Private Higher Education Institutions (VPH), Member of the Board of Trustees (since 2022)
- Stiftung Lesen, Member of the Board of Trustees (since 2022)
- German National Association for Student Affairs, Ex-Officio Member of the Board of Trustees (since 2022)
- Magnus Hirschfeld Foundation, Deputy Member of the Board of Trustees (since 2022)
- Young European Federalists (YEF), Member

== Political positions ==
Schröder advocates policies that are "fair to all generations". She criticized the proposal by Federal Labor Minister Hubertus Heil to set a double halfway point for pension levels and contribution rates until 2025 as "blatantly unfair to the younger generation" and "unsustainable." Schröder is a member of the Young Pension Commission, which was formed in response to the federal government's pension commission.

Schröder calls for privatization of parts of German public broadcasting.

During the COVID-19 pandemic in Germany, she called for the removal of the bureaucratic hurdles of BAföG as an emergency aid for students in financial emergencies.

In October 2023, Schröder opposed a further increase in BAföG payments, Germany's federal student financial aid programme, in an interview with Der Spiegel, emphasising students' personal responsibility for financing their education. She asked: "Why don't some people work alongside their studies?" Her remarks also drew criticism from within the Young Liberals, the FDP's youth organisation. Its then-federal chairwoman, Franziska Brandmann, disagreed with Schröder, arguing that BAföG payments should be adjusted further if necessary in response to rising living costs. She maintained that financial aid should cover students' basic needs and enable them to pursue higher education regardless of their parents' income.

Schröder was among a group of members of the Bundestag led by Kristine Lütke who appeared in a video ahead of the repeal of Section 219a of the German Criminal Code, which prohibited advertising abortion services. In the video, the politicians were seen dancing and making a cut-throat gesture towards the camera. The video sparked criticism from politicians and the media, who described it as being in poor taste given the sensitive nature of the issue. Dorothee Bär criticised the video, stating that no woman goes to have an abortion dancing and singing. Lütke subsequently deleted the video and described the incident as a misunderstanding, while Schröder defended the video.
