= Franziska Brandmann =

German politician (born 1994)

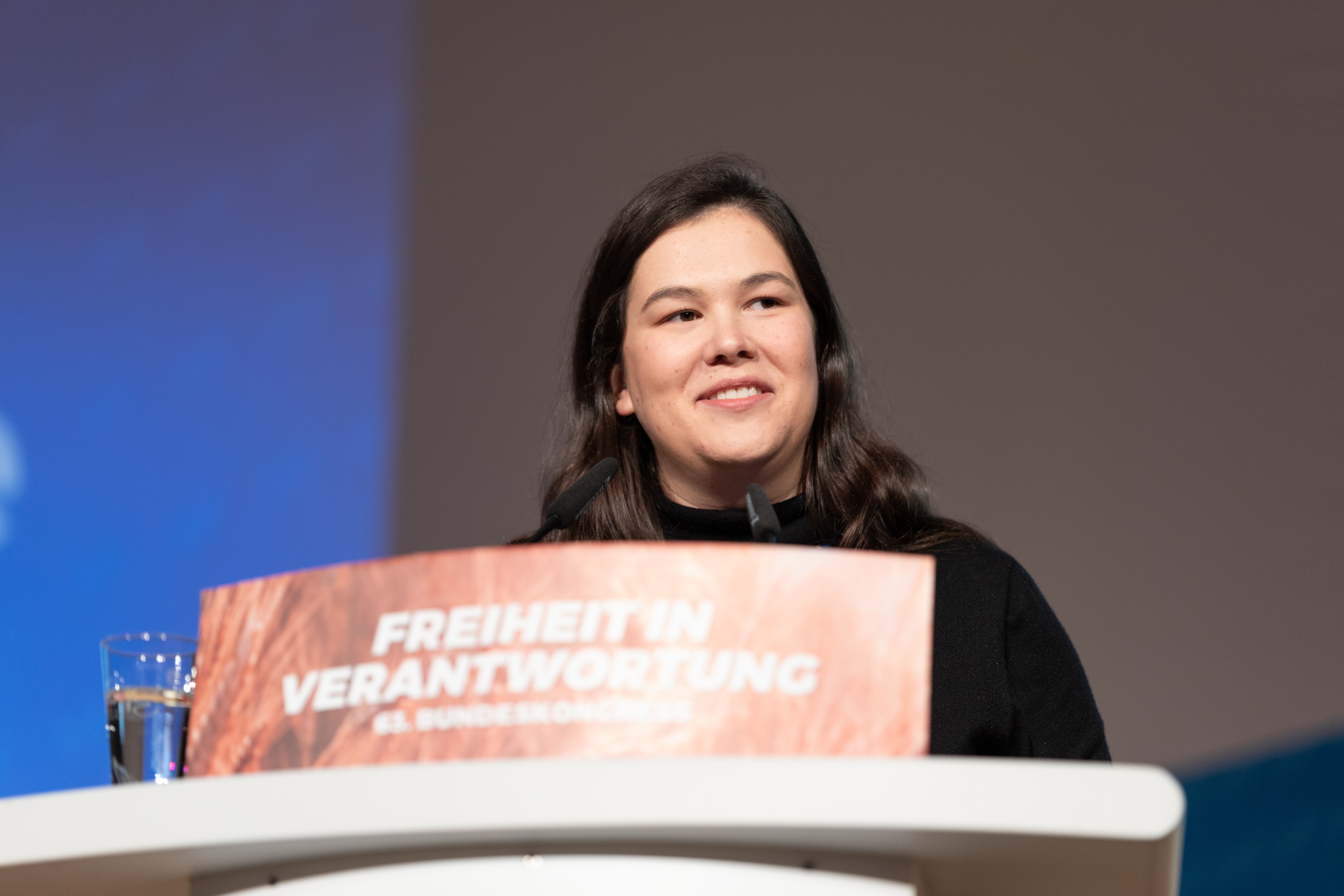
- Brandmann in 2021

Federal Chairwoman of the Young Liberals of Germany
- Incumbent
- Assumed office 2021
- Preceded by: Jens Teutrine

Personal details
- Born: 28 April 1994 (age 32) Münster, North Rhine-Westphalia, Germany
- Party: Free Democratic Party (FDP)
- Education: University of Bonn

Franziska Brandmann (born 28 April 1994 in Münster) is a German politician and member of the Free Democratic Party (FDP). She has been the federal chairwoman of the FDP-affiliated youth organization Young Liberals (Junge Liberale) since 2021.

== Education ==
Brandmann studied political science at the University of Bonn and European politics at the University of Oxford. Currently, Brandmann is pursuing a PhD and teaching at Oxford on the relationship between contestable democracy and far-right parties.

== Political career ==
Brandmann was elected at the federal congress of the Young Liberals on 13 November 2021 in Erlangen, with 182 of 197 votes cast (92.4%) as the federal chairwoman of the Young Liberals. The previous chairman, Jens Teutrine, had not stood for re-election, having been elected to the Bundestag.

== Positions ==
Franziska Brandmann advocates for market economy and civil liberties. She calls for a "BAföG" reform to support students with financial difficulties, for lower taxes for medium and low incomes, as well as for enhanced support for Ukraine. Also, she argued for a reform of public broadcasting in Germany: The broadcasters should concentrate only on education and information, instead on entertainment and sports. She opposes mandatory quotas for women, a general speed limit at German Autobahnen, civil conscription, and further raising the minimum wage.
