= Irmgard Schwaetzer =

German politician and church official

Irmgard Schwaetzer Bundesministerin a. D.
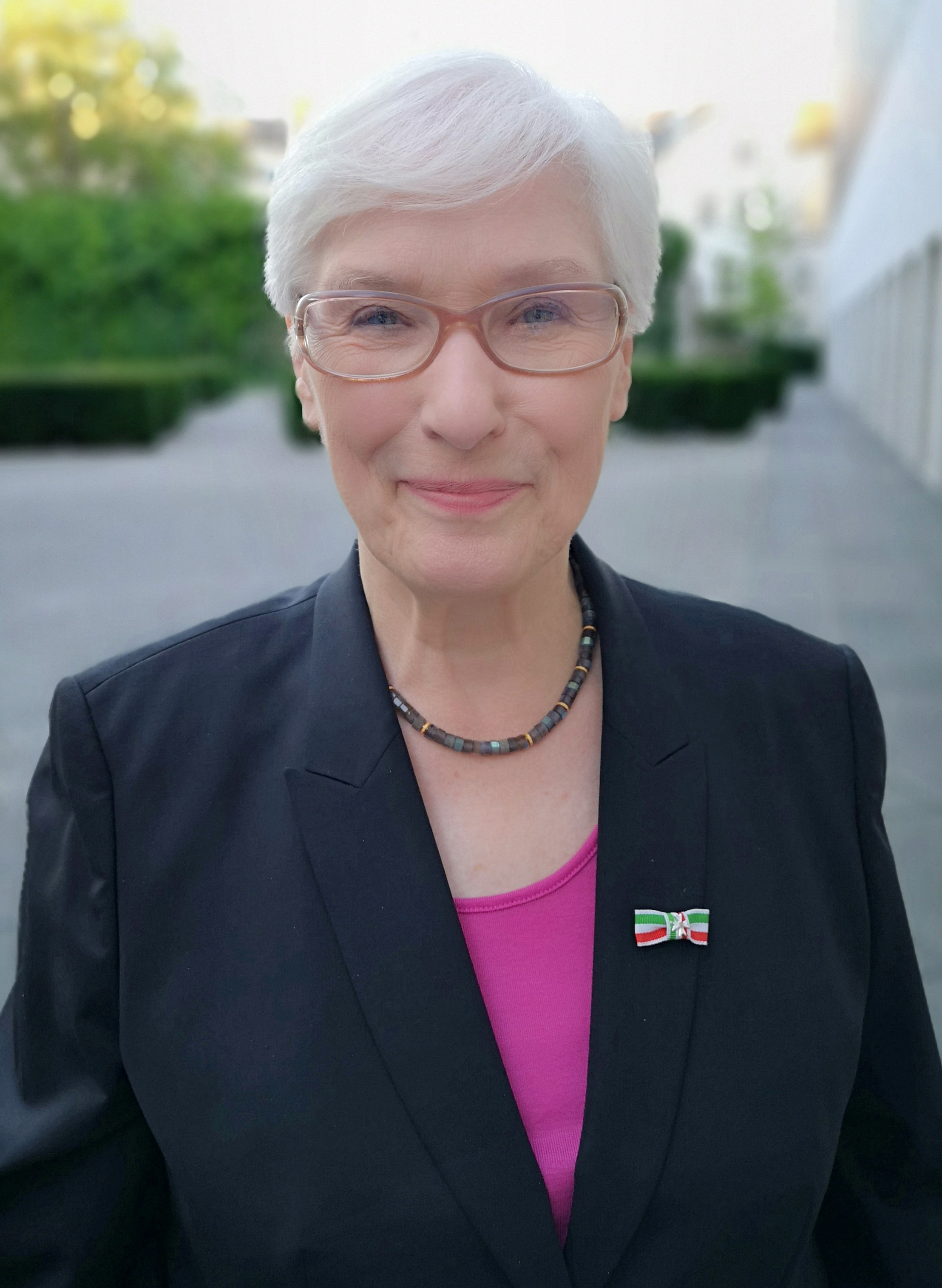
- Adam-Schwaetzer in 2018

Federal Minister for Regional Planning, Building and Urban Development
- In office 18 January 1991 – 17 November 1994
- Chancellor: Helmut Kohl
- Preceded by: Gerda Hasselfeldt
- Succeeded by: Klaus Töpfer

Personal details
- Born: 5 April 1942 (age 84) Münster, Nazi Germany
- Party: Free Democratic Party
- Occupation: Politician

Irmgard Schwaetzer (born 5 April 1942) is a German politician of the Free Democratic Party (FDP) and a Protestant church official. From 2013 to 2021, she chaired the Synod of the Protestant Church in Germany (EKD). She is the central founding figure, as well as honorary chairwoman, of the Liberal Women.

== Early life and education ==
In 1971, Schwaetzer received a doctorate in pharmacy from the University of Bonn.

== Career ==
From 1980 to 2002, Schwaetzer served as a member of the Bundestag. Under the leadership of chairman Hans-Dietrich Genscher, she was the Secretary General of the FDP between 1982 and 1984.

Following the 1987 West German federal election, Schwaetzer was appointed as Minister of State at the Federal Foreign Office in the government led by Chancellor Helmut Kohl. In that capacity, she oversaw the ministry's activities on European policy and cultural affairs. At a party convention in 1988, she narrowly lost against Otto Graf Lambsdorff in a vote on the FDP leadership.

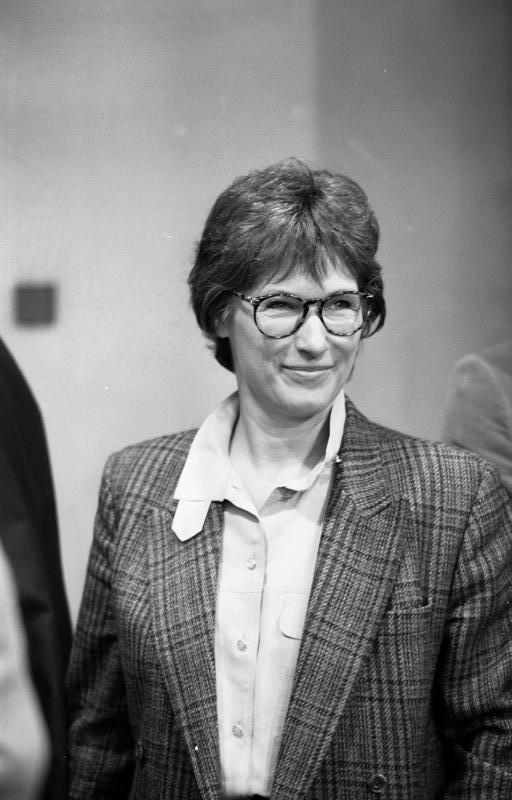
Schwaetzer in 1991

In January 1991 Schwaetzer was appointed Federal Minister of Spatial Planning, Construction and Urbanism, succeeding Gerda Hasselfeldt. During her time in office, she oversaw various architectural design competitions on construction projects that eventually permitted Germany's Parliament and government to move from Bonn to Berlin after German reunification.

Following the resignation of Hans-Dietrich Genscher in 1992, Kohl and Lambsdorff nominated Schwaetzer to be the new Foreign Minister. In a surprise decision, her own FDP parliamentary group rejected her nomination shortly after and voted instead to name Justice Minister Klaus Kinkel to head the Foreign Office. Schwaetzer would have been the first woman to hold a senior cabinet post in Germany.

Schwaetzer later became the target of public criticism in 1993 when she said in a contribution to a house organ published by Munich-based Germania Investment Management that the company could make "valuable contributions" to solving the problems of housing and office space, both of which were in acute shortage in the formerly Communist eastern part of the country at the time.

Schwaetzer retired on 17 November 1994 from the Federal Government.

From 1998 to 2002, Schwaetzer chaired the working group for labor and social policy, health policy, family, women's and youth policy of the FDP parliamentary group.

== Other activities ==
- Protestant Church in Germany (EKD), Member of the Council
- Garrison Church Potsdam, Member of the Board of Trustees (since 2015)
- Gegen Vergessen – Für Demokratie, Deputy Chairwoman (since 2014)
- Gemeinschaftswerk der Evangelischen Publizistik (GEP), Member of the Supervisory Board (since 2013)
- Foundation for the Humboldt Forum in the Berlin Palace, Member of the Council (since 2010)
- Evangelical Academy of Berlin, Member of the Board of Trustees (since 2009)
- Studium in Israel, Member of the Board of Trustees
- Friedrich Naumann Foundation, Member of the Board (2003-2014)

== Recognition ==
- 1989 – Grand Decoration of Honour in Silver with Sash for Services to the Republic of Austria
- Grand Cross of the Order of Prince Henry
- Grand Cross of the Order of the Falcon

== See also ==
- Protestant Church in Germany
- List of ministers of the Federal Republic of Germany
- Fourth Kohl cabinet
