= Stephan Hermlin =

German writer and translator (1915–1997)

- Stephan Hermlin in 1955
- Born: Rudolf Leder; April 13, 1915; Chemnitz, Germany
- Died: April 6, 1997 (aged 81); Berlin
- Occupation: Author
- Relatives: David and Lola Leder
- Writing career
- Genres: Stories, essays, translations, and lyric poetry
- Notable awards: Heinrich Heine Award
- Movement: Communism

Stephan Hermlin (German: [ˈʃtɛ.fan ˈhɛʁm.liːn]; 13 April 1915 – 6 April 1997), real name Rudolf Leder, was a German author. He wrote, among other things, stories, essays, translations, and lyric poetry and was one of the more well-known authors of former East Germany.

== Life ==
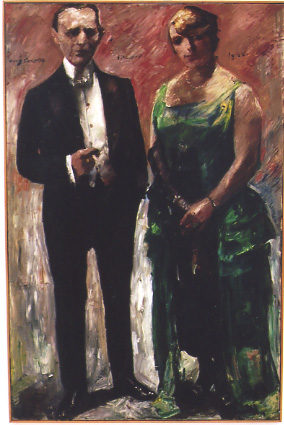
Parents David and Lola Leder painted by Lovis Corinth

Hermlin was born in 1915 in Chemnitz, Germany, in what is now the Federal State of Saxony, the son of Jewish immigrant and art collector David Leder and his wife Lola, he grew both in Chemnitz and in Berlin. In 1931, he joined a communist youth organization. From 1933 until 1936, he worked as a printer's apprentice. He emigrated from Germany in 1936, and between then and his return to Germany in 1945 at the end of World War II, lived in Palestine, France, and Switzerland. After his return to Germany, he worked as a radio broadcaster in Frankfurt am Main. He moved to East Berlin in 1947, and was a contributor to several communist magazines, including Tägliche Rundschau, Ulenspiegel, Aufbau, and Sinn und Form. Tägliche Rundschau (English: Daily Review) was the official newspaper of the Soviet military administration and later the Soviet High Commission in East Berlin until 1955. As the author of several well-known pro-Stalin propaganda songs, Hermlin soon was working in some of the most important governmental bodies in the Soviet-occupied zone of Germany. By 1949, he was one of the most powerful and influential writers in the newly founded German Democratic Republic. As a close friend of Walter Ulbricht and Erich Honecker, Hermlin soon found himself at the forefront of East German culture and politics, and split his time between them.

In December 1962 Hermlin joined the initiators of a group dedicated to the reading of young poets at the East German Akademie der Künste (English: Academy of Arts). Some of the poets featured by this group included Wolf Biermann, Volker Braun, Bernd Jentzsch, Sarah Kirsch, and Karl Mickel. This group, and the Akademie der Künste as a whole, was at the forefront of a spike in the popularity of lyric poetry in 1960s East Germany. Thereupon, he was relieved of his position of Secretary of Poetry at the Akademie, although he remained a member. He was a critic of the Soviet crushing of the Prague Spring in 1968, although he did not make these criticisms very open. He was much more open in his criticism of the East German government's 1976 expulsion of a contemporary poet, Wolf Biermann, whose poetry Hermlin exhibited some years previously. Going against the official politics of the day, he, in conjunction with Erich Honecker, organized a conference of writers dedicated to the furthering of peace and reconciliation, the Berliner Begegnung. He was also a member of the Schriftstellerverband der DDR and the Akademie der Künste West Berlin (English: East German Writer's Association and West Berlin Academy of the Arts, respectively).

Hermlin died in Berlin. The German journalist and writer Mirna Funk is his great-granddaughter.

== Awards ==
- 1948 Heinrich Heine Award, awarded by the Schutzverband Deutscher Autoren (English: Association of German Authors)
- 1950 National Award, awarded by the East German government, for the Mansfeld Speech
- 1954 National Award, awarded by the East German government, for work on a documentary about Ludwig van Beethoven
- 1958 F.C. Weiskopf Award
- 1972 Heinrich Heine Award, awarded by the East German Cultural Ministry
- 1975 National Award, awarded by the East German government
