= Kristine Lütke =

German politician (born 1982)

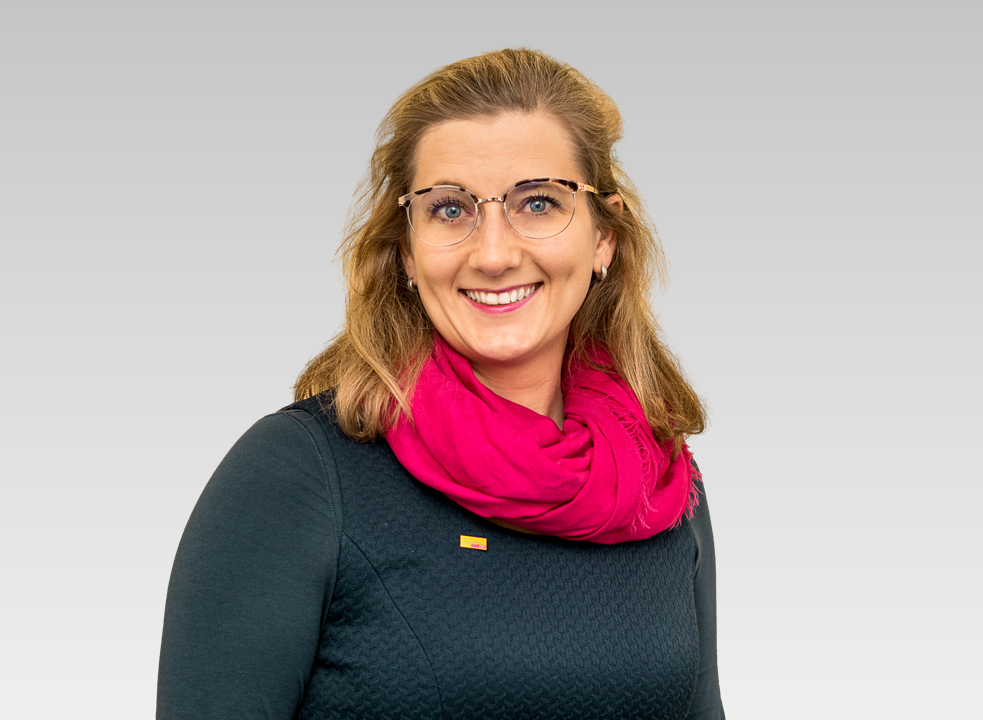
Kristine Lütke

Kristine Lütke (born 29 June 1982) is a German politician of the FDP who served as member of the Bundestag from 2021 to 2025.

== Early life and education ==
Lütke grew up in Schwand in the municipality of Schwanstetten. In 1989, after graduating from high school in Roth, she spent a year abroad in Canada. She then studied social work at the Technische Hochschule Nürnberg from 2002 to 2007 and graduated with a degree in social pedagogy. This was followed by studies in gerontology at the Friedrich-Alexander University of Erlangen-Nuremberg from 2007 to 2010. From 2013 to 2014, Lütke took further training to become a facilities manager.

Together with her family, Lütke runs a senior care and nursing facility in Lauf.

== Political career ==
Lütke has been a member of the FDP since 2017. In 2018, she was chairwoman of the Wirtschaftsjunioren Deutschlands. She is treasurer of the FDP Bavaria and a district councilor in the district of Nürnberger Land.

Lütke ran in the 2021 German federal election as a direct candidate in the Roth federal electoral district and in 12th place on the state list of the FDP. As the FDP Bavaria won 14 seats, Lütke was a member of the 20th German Bundestag.

In December 2021, Lütke was elected as the addiction and drug policy spokeswoman of the FDP parliamentary group. She was also a member of the Health Committee.

In the run-up to the vote of the Bundestag to remove §219a from the penal code Lütke published a video, in which she dances together with other MPs with sunglasses through a corridor overlaid with the text "On our way to the vote to kick 219a from the penal code". At this, all deputies made the head-down gesture with their right hand in the direction of the camera. Lütke received massive criticism for this in the social media. CSU politician Dorothee Bär spoke of the most tasteless tweet in a long time. No woman would dance on the way to an abortion. Lütke deleted the video after massive criticism from politicians and the media saying she had been misunderstood. In contrast, Ria Schröder, a member of the Bundestag for the FDP, who was also seen in the video making the head-down gesture, defended the video.
