= Johannes Rothenberger =

German politician (born 1980)

Johannes Rothenberger MdB

Member of the Bundestag; for Offenburg
- Incumbent
- Assumed office 25 March 2025
- Preceded by: Stefan Kaufmann

Personal details
- Born: 7 August 1980 (age 46) Oberkirch, West Germany
- Party: Christian Democratic Union
- Education: University of Freiburg

Johannes Rothenberger (born 7 August 1980) is a German politician who was elected as a member of the Bundestag in 2025. He has served as chairman of the Christian Democratic Union in Ortenau since 2024.
