= Gesine Meißner =

German politician (born 1952)

Gesine Meißner MEP
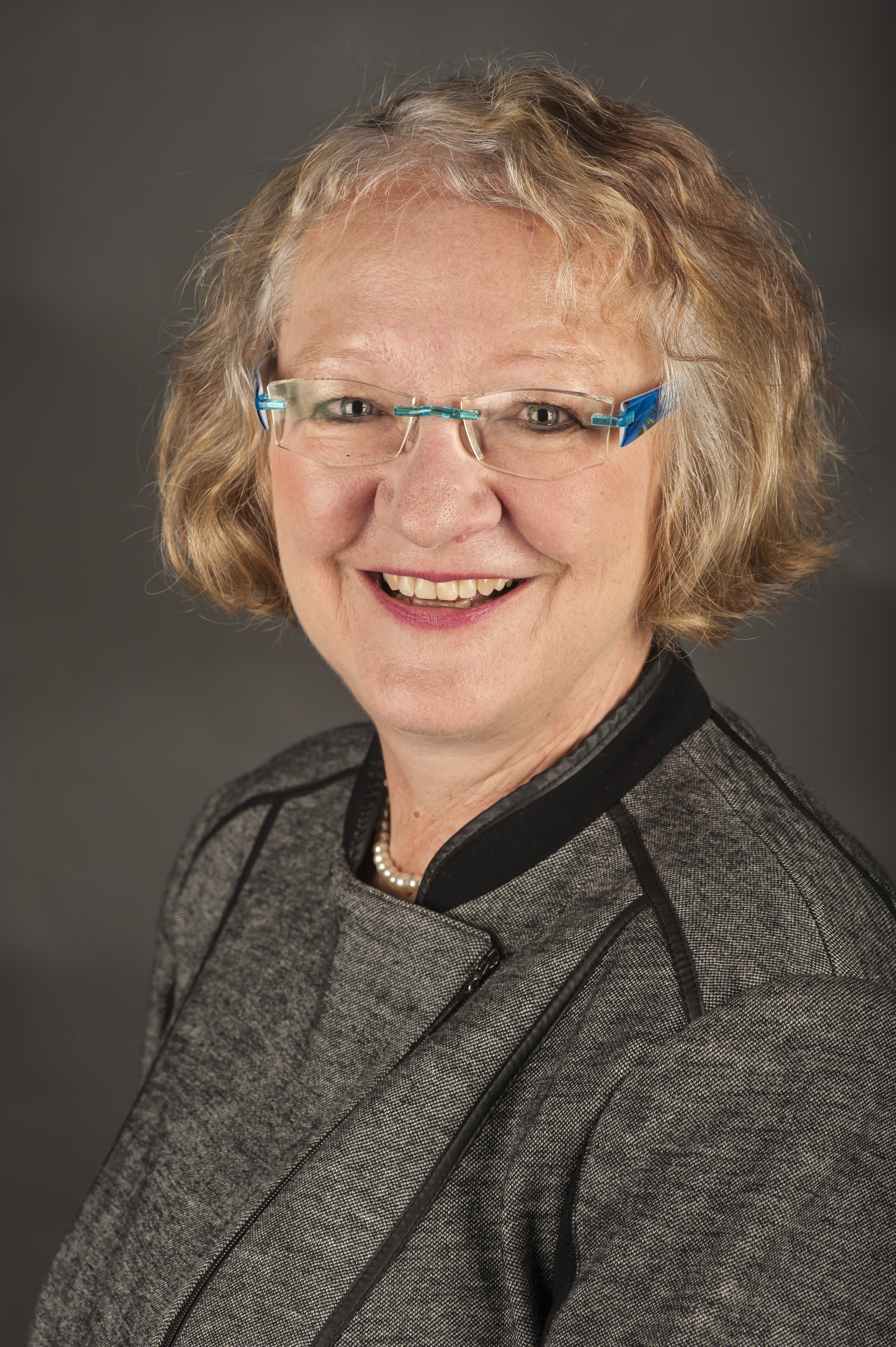

Member of the European Parliament
- In office 1 July 2009 – 2019
- Constituency: Germany

Personal details
- Born: 22 February 1952 (age 74) Uelzen, Germany
- Party: German: Free Democratic Party; EU: Alliance of Liberals and Democrats for Europe
- Education: Leibniz University Hannover
- Website: www.gesine-meissner.de

Gesine Meißner (born 22 February 1952) is a German politician who served as Member of the European Parliament (MEP) from 2009 until 2019. She is a member of the Free Democratic Party, part of the Alliance of Liberals and Democrats for Europe.

== Early life and career ==
Gesine Meißner was born in 1952 in Uelzen, Lower Saxony, Germany. She studied nutritional science and home economics, German and English, communication and pedagogic in Munich (1971–1974) and Hannover (1976–1980). From 1984 until 1993, Meißner was the deputy director of the "Rural Adult Education Lower Saxony" association. Since 1993, has been working as a freelance communication trainer.

== Political career ==
Meißner was elected to the Lower Saxon Landtag in 2003, and was re-elected in 2008. From 2003 to 2009, she chaired the Committee on Health and Social Affairs.

=== Member of the European Parliament ===
At the 2009 European elections, Meißner was elected to the European Parliament. She served as coordinator of the Alliance of Liberals and Democrats for Europe Group on the Committee on Transport and Tourism and a substitute member in the Development Committee as well as in the Committee on Fisheries. Meißner was also a member of the EU-Mexico and Euro-Latin America Delegations. In addition, she served as chairwoman of the European Parliament Intergroup on Seas, Rivers, Islands and Coastal Areas; a vice-chairwoman of the European Parliament Intergroup on the Freedom of Religion and Belief and Religious Tolerance; and a member of the European Parliament Intergroup on LGBT Rights.

Meißner is a member of the council of the Alliance of Liberals and Democrats for Europe Party and the federal executive board of the German Free Democratic Party (FDP). She was elected as President of the Liberal Women in Germany in March 2014, and as Vice President of the ALDE Party Gender Equality Network in November 2013.

In November 2017, Meißner announced that she would not stand in the 2019 European elections but instead resign from active politics by the end of the parliamentary term.

== Other activities ==
- St Barbara Foundation, Member of the Board of Trustees
