= Birgit Homburger =

German politician (born 1965)

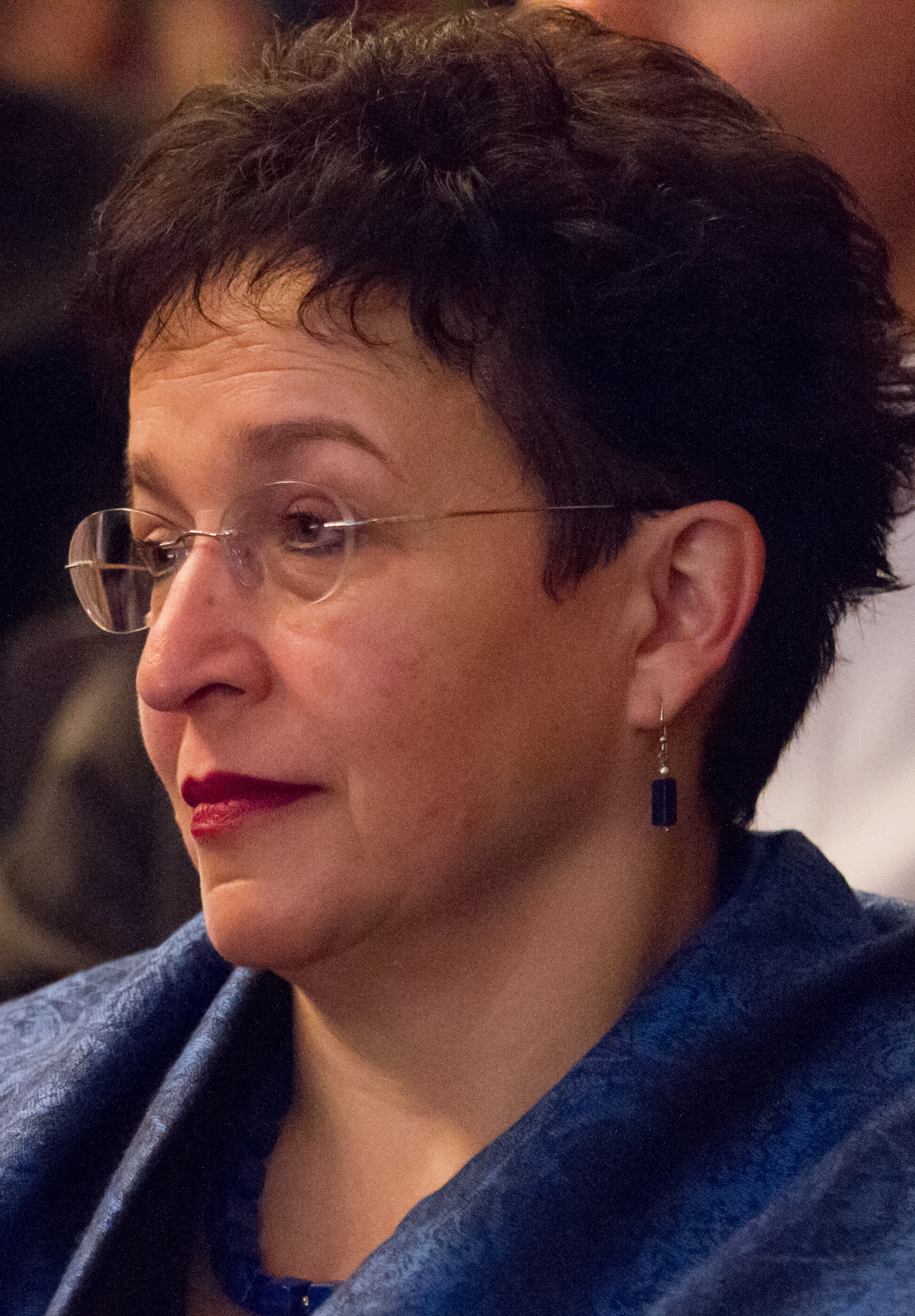

Member of the German Bundestag
- In office 1990–2013

Personal details
- Born: April 11, 1965 (age 61) Singen, West Germany
- Party: FDP
- Education: University of Konstanz
- Occupation: Politician

Birgit Homburger (born April 11, 1965, in Singen, West Germany) is a former German politician from the Free Democratic Party (FDP).

She served as the chairwoman of the FDP parliamentary group in the Bundestag from October 2009 to May 2011 and was one of the deputy chairpersons of the FDP parliamentary group from 2002 to 2009. From 2004 to 2013, she was the state chairwoman of the FDP in Baden-Württemberg. Additionally, she held the position of deputy federal chairwoman from May 2011 to March 2013.

== Biography ==
After completing her Abitur (high school diploma) in 1984 at Friedrich-Wöhler-Gymnasium in Singen, she pursued a degree in Public Administration at the University of Konstanz from 1984 to 1989.

Following her departure from the Bundestag, Birgit Homburger joined the international executive search firm Odgers Berndtson in Frankfurt/Main as a partner in 2014. Since February 19, 2016, she has been leading the Berlin office of the German Equity Institute e.V.

=== Political career ===
Since 1982, Homburger has been a member of the Free Democratic Party (FDP). In 1984, she also joined the Young Liberals, of which she served as the state chairwoman in Baden-Württemberg from 1988 to 1991.

In September 1990, during the first all-German congress of the merged, all-German youth association of the FDP, Homburger was elected as the Federal Chairwoman of the Young Liberals and held the position until 1993.

From 1993 to 2013, Homburger was a member of the FDP State Executive Committee in Baden-Württemberg. In 1997, she was elected as the deputy state chairwoman and in 2004, succeeding the resigned Walter Döring, she became the chairwoman of the FDP State Association in Baden-Württemberg, a position she retained after being confirmed in 2010.

Since 1991, Homburger has been a member of the Federal Executive Board and since 2001, she has also been part of the Presidium of the FDP. She was re-elected in 2005 and 2011. However, on March 10, 2013, during the FDP Federal Party Conference in Berlin, she was voted out of her position as deputy chairwoman of the FDP.

Birgit Homburger was a member of the German Bundestag from 1990 to 2013. From 2009 to 2011, she served as the chairwoman of the FDP parliamentary group in the Bundestag.
