= Liberal Women (Germany) =

- German name: Liberale Frauen
- Abbrivation name: LiF
- Chairman: Jacqueline Krüger
- Deputy: Tatjana Sosin
- Deputy: Henriette Panow
- Deputy: Heike Schaumann
- Treasurer: Anja Offermann
- Founder: Irmgard Schwaetzer
- Founded: 1990
- Headquarters: Hamburg, Germany
- Ideology: Liberal feminism Individualist feminism Equity feminism
- Political position: Centre-right
- National affiliation: Free Democratic Party

Website
- liberale-frauen.de

Liberal Women (German: Liberale Frauen) are a German individualist women's political organization that was founded in 1990 as an independent association, but has been recognized as the women's wing of the liberal FDP since 1994.

== History ==
In the 1970s, the FDP adopted the Freiburg theses as its basic program. As a result, it changed from a right-wing national liberal party to a left-leaning social liberal organization. In the course of this, the FDP was one of the first parties to pass a paper on gender equality in 1972. In 1987 the federal executive committee of the FDP decided on a women's advancement plan with the aim of increasing the proportion of women in executive boards and parliaments. Several so-called women's congresses were also held. The third was particularly successful in Hamburg in the autumn of 1990, criticism of the FDP's policy to promote women was expressed from among the 600 participants. Then the Federal Association of Liberal Women was founded on the initiative of Irmgard Adam-Schwaetzer.

This association initially stood next to already existing women's organizations of the FDP. For example, there were FDP women's committees in North Rhine-Westphalia or FDP state working groups such as in Lower Saxony. The establishment of the Liberal Women was therefore not supported by party chairman Otto Graf Lambsdorff and general secretary Cornelia Schmalz-Jacobsen.

It was not recognized until 1994, and in 1997 the number of members increased to 450.

In 2004 the general assembly adopted its own basic program under the title "For a gender-equitable society". The aim of the program was to increase equal opportunities within society.

Documents of the Liberal Women are kept in the Archives of Liberalism of the Friedrich Naumann Foundation for Freedom in Gummersbach (North Rhine-Westphalia).

By resolution of the FDP federal executive board, the federal chairwoman of the Liberal Women can attend its meetings without voting rights, provided that she is a member of the FDP.

== Political work and ideas ==
In Germany, as is usual in Europe, the term "liberal" is associated with either classical liberalism or neoliberalism, in contrast to the Anglo-American meaning in connection with social liberalism and similar left-leaning ideologies. Therefore, the Liberal Woman supports "liberal feminism" by German political standards, but in Anglo-American means it is more of an individualist feminism than liberal feminism.

The theses of the association can be divided into social and internal party goals. At the social level, the goal is a "gender-equitable society" which, according to the organization, is characterized solely by equality of opportunity and not by equality of outcome. It also rejects the achievement of these goal through state intervention in society and the economy.

At the internal party level, the organization wants to promote the engagement of women in grassroots and party offices. The Liberal Women support and promote the candidacies of women within the party, address women specifically and seek contact with other women's organizations. The organization of almost a thousand members of all age groups takes place, similar to the political parties, in the federal association and so far 14 regional associations. The members work actively on the politics of the FDP in various federal and state committees. In addition, they have the right to introduce political proposals and to make speeches at all party conventions of the FDP.

== Chairwomen ==
- Irmgard Schwaetzer 1990–2001
- Ina Lenke 2001–2006
- Sibylle Laurischk 2006–2008
- Mieke Senftleben 2008–2010
- Doris Buchholz 2010–2014
- Gesine Meißner 2014–2016
- Katja Grosch 2016–2020
- Jacqueline Krüger since 2020

== Sources ==
- Website of the Liberal Women (German)
- Programme of the Liberal Women (German)
