= Mirna Funk =

German writer and journalist

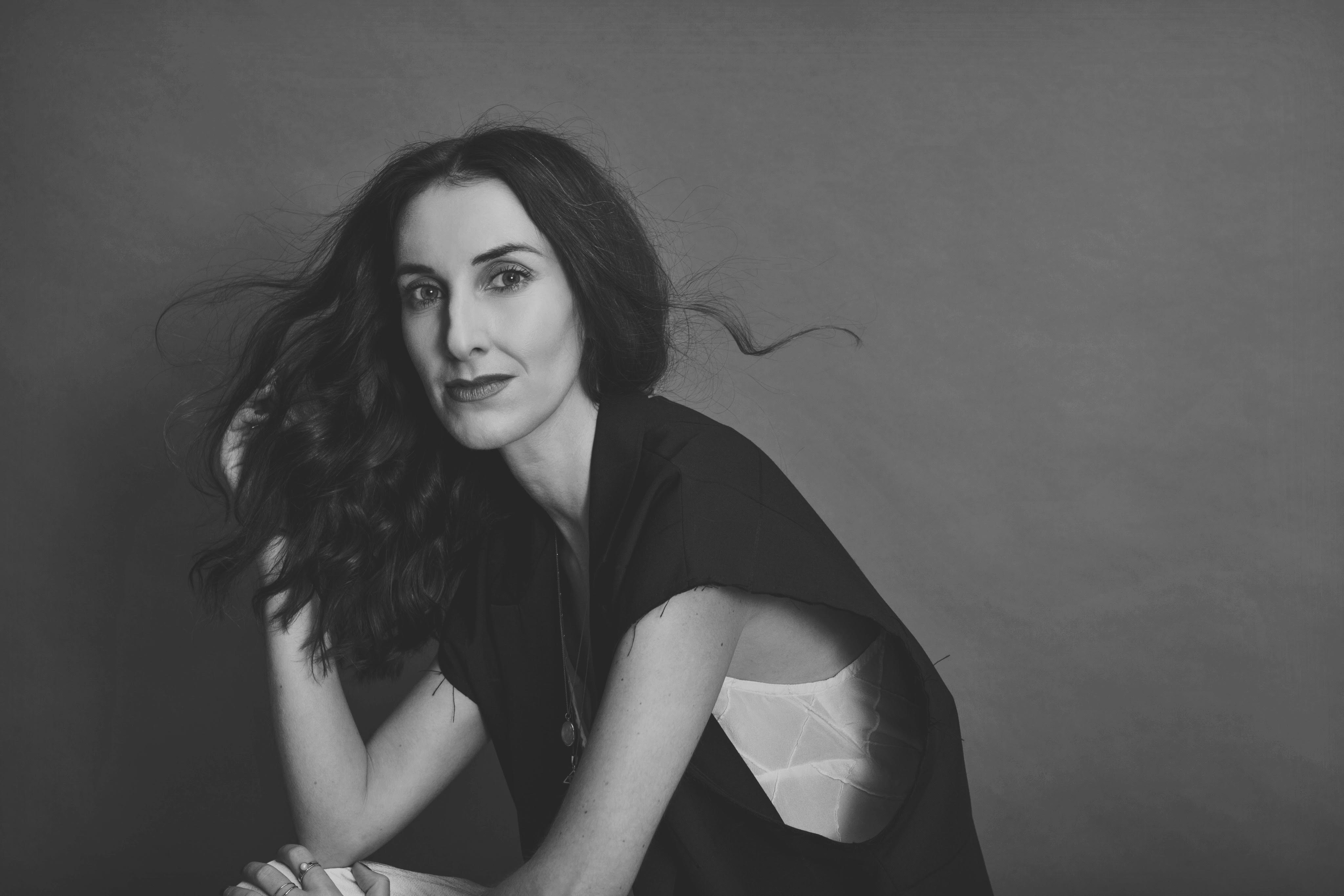
- Mirna Funk (2020)
- Born: 2 March 1981 (age 45); East Berlin (modern Pankow)
- Education: Humboldt University of Berlin
- Occupations: Writer; Journalist
- Writing career
- Language: German
- Period: 21st century literature
- Genres: Novel; Political essay
- Notable works: Winternähe (2015); Who Cares! Von der Freiheit, Frau zu sein (2022)
- Notable awards: Uwe Johnson Prize 2015; Aspekte-Literaturpreis 2015
- Movements: Contemporary literature Individualist feminism Liberal Zionism
- Website: mirnafunk.com/

Mirna Funk (born 2 March 1981 in East Berlin) is a German journalist, author and individualist feminist.

== Life ==
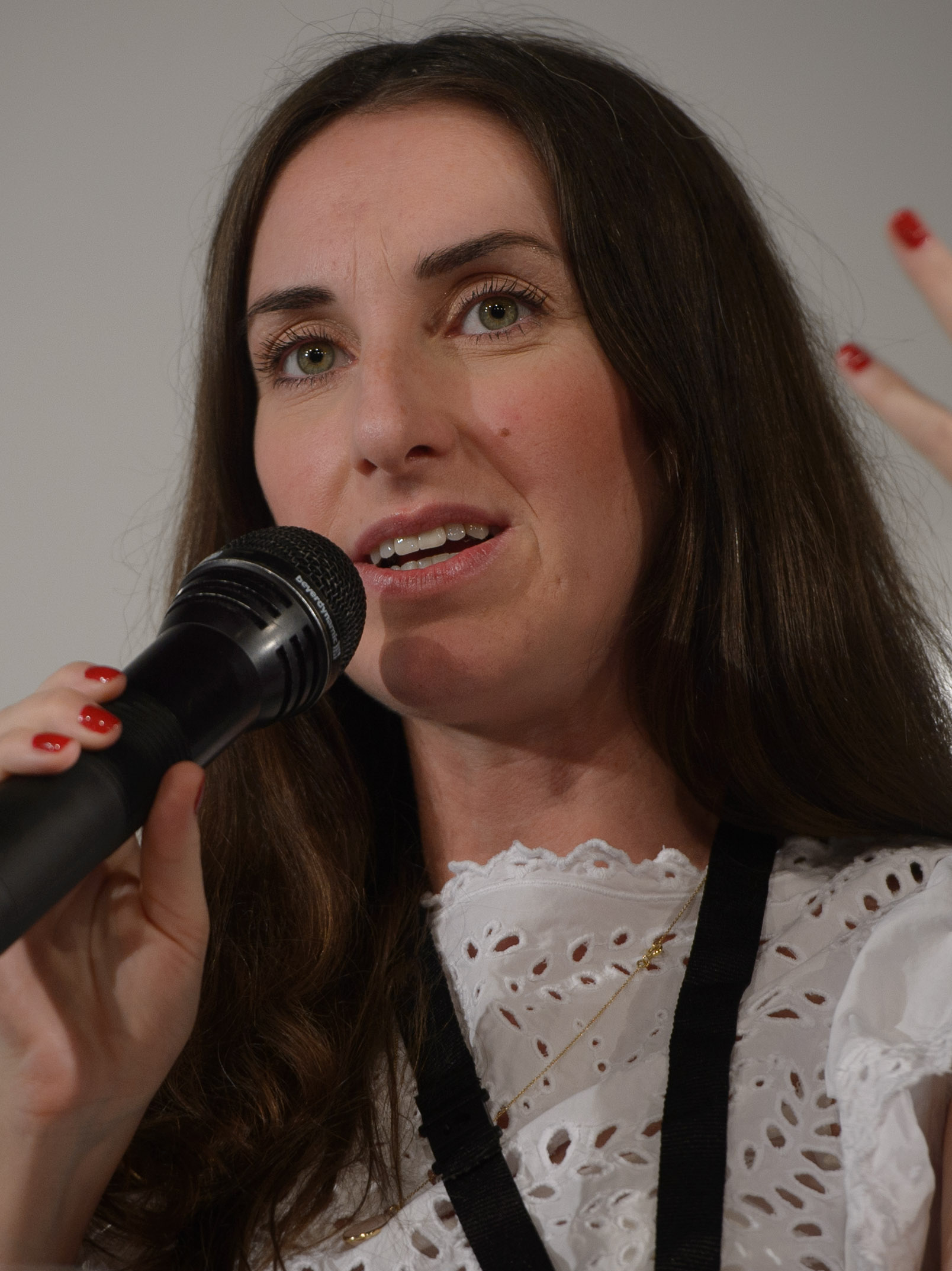
Mirna Funk (2015)

Funk studied philosophy and history at Humboldt University of Berlin. She is currently working as a freelance journalist for works such as Der Freitag and Zeit Magazin and publishes texts on culture, society and the arts. In the summer of 2014, she contributed interviews from Israel to Zeit Magazine and wrote about her life there during the 2014 Israel-Gaza conflict. In her article Ohne mich (″Without Me″) Funk wrote about antisemitism and her emigration to Israel.

On 23 July 2015, S. Fischer Verlag published her debut novel Winternähe. Funk received the Uwe Johnson Prize in 2015.

In 2022, she finished her work Who Cares? Von der Freiheit, Frau zu sein, in which she promotes an individualist, sex-positive feminism with several anecdotes of her life.

She is the great-granddaughter of the renowned writer Stephan Hermlin and lives in Berlin and Tel Aviv.

== Selected works ==
- Winternähe, S. Fischer, Frankfurt am Main 2015, ISBN 978-3-10-002419-0
- Wo ist Papa, 2018, ISBN 978-3-00-061319-7
- Zwischen Du und Ich, dtv Verlagsgesellschaft, München 2021, ISBN 978-3-00-061319-7
- Who Cares! Von der Freiheit, Frau zu sein. dtv Verlagsgesellschaft, München 2022, ISBN 978-3-423-44108-7
