= Elvira Drobinski-Weiß =

German politician

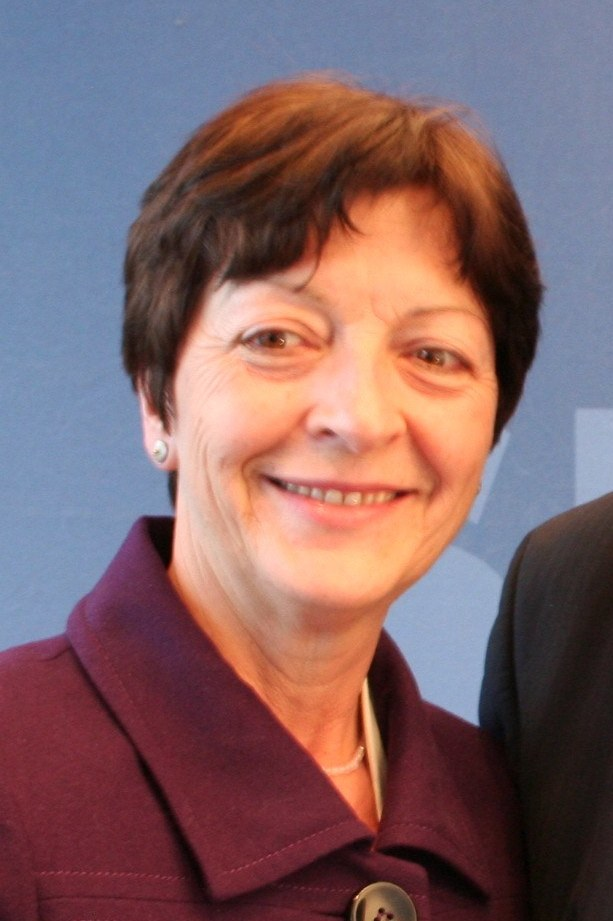

Member of the Bundestag
- In office 2004–2017

Representative of the Parliamentary Assembly of the Council of Europe
- In office 2014–2018

Personal details
- Party: Social Democratic Party
- Website: elvira-drobinski-weiss.de

Elvira Drobinski-Weiß (born 26 June 1951 in Norderney) is a German former politician. A member of the Social Democratic Party, she served in the Bundestag from 2004 to 2017.
