= Nikita Klæstrup =

Danish supermodel and political commentator (born 1994)

Nikita Klæstrup (born 8 November 1994 in Guldborgsund) is a Danish political commentator, journalist, radio hostess and former fashion model and reality TV star. She was a member of the Liberal Alliance but was a member of Young Conservatives until after the 2015 Danish general election. She left Liberal Alliance in 2019, and has since worked in the Danish tabloid media.

== Early life and education ==
Klæstrup was born in 1994, the daughter of a Social Democrats father and a mother who was a former member of the Red–Green Alliance. She comes from the Guldborgsund Municipality. Klæstrup is a student from Vordingborg Gymnasium and HF, and is now a rhetoric student at the University of Copenhagen.

== Political career ==
Klæstrup was a member of the Young Conservatives (Konservativ Ungdom, or KU) until 2015. During her time in that party, she was local association president in Lolland-Falster KU from 2012 to 2014. She ran for the Conservative People's Party in the 2013 Danish local elections for the council in Guldborgsund Municipality. She received 128 personal votes, but was not elected.

Klæstrup changed to the Liberal Alliance after the 2015 general election.

=== Model and media attention ===
Klæstrup has worked as a fashion model for several years, including topless pictures. The combination of her political work and her physical appearance has secured her a lot of media publicity. The first time she received attention was during the municipal elections in 2013, when she won a competition for This Year's Election Babe, which was held by the tabloid newspaper Ekstra Bladet.

At the University of Copenhagen's 110-year anniversary gala in 2015, she attended in a deep-cut reverse halter dress which caused a stir in both Danish and foreign media. She was covered by the local press including Berlingske and Jyllands-Posten. Later that year, she appeared in a photo shoot for men's magazine M! which also showed her scantily dressed on the front cover. Her media performances made her the most Googled Danish politician and the most Googled Danish woman in a survey by Google Denmark in 2015.

Following the media attention, she appeared as a guest participant on TV3's reality series Paradise Hotel in 2016. In 2019, she appeared on TV3 in the Danish realityprogramm Divaer i Junglen for season 4.

=== Political commentator ===
Klæstrup penned a letter to the editor after Copenhagen Pride (the Copenhagen Municipality's annual gay pride parade) dissenting the event as promoting discrimination of homosexuality. She noted that the parade contributed to the stigmatization of homosexuals who do not want to be associated with this "circus parade".

In addition, she has criticised Freetown Christiania several times, including a speech in 2014 in Berlingske, where she called it a "harmful parallel society" and "a disgrace to Copenhagen", which was "an affront to law-abiding Danes." She believed that the Freetown should be normalized and converted into an ordinary residential area. Her comments led to violent reactions, including several personal threats. An 18-year-old woman was subsequently sentenced to a suspended prison sentence for making death threats against Klæstrup.
