= Hans Furler =

German politician and lawyer (1904–1975)

President of the European Parliament
- In office 18 March 1960 – 27 March 1962
- Preceded by: Robert Schuman
- Succeeded by: Gaetano Martino
- In office 27 November 1956 – 19 March 1958
- Preceded by: Giuseppe Pella
- Succeeded by: Robert Schuman

Member of the Bundestag; from Baden-Württemberg
- In office 6 October 1953 – 13 December 1972
- Preceded by: Multi-member district
- Succeeded by: Wolfgang Schäuble
- Constituency: State list (1953–1957); Offenburg (1957–1972)

Personal details
- Born: 5 June 1904 Lahr, German Empire
- Died: 29 June 1975 (aged 71) Achern, West Germany
- Party: Christian Democratic Union; European People's Party
- Education: University of Freiburg; Humboldt University of Berlin; Heidelberg University

Hans Furler (5 June 1904 – 29 June 1975) was a German Christian-democrat politician. He was the president of the European Parliament (or, more precisely, precursors of the European Parliament) from 1956 to 1958 and from 1960 to 1962.

== Early life ==
Furler was born in Lahr in the Baden portion of the Black Forest. After graduating from Lahr Grammar School, Furler studied law in Freiburg in Breisgau, Berlin and Heidelberg. In 1925 he passed his first state examination and in 1928 he earned his doctorate with a thesis on "The Police's emergency measures and the state's obligation to compensate".

In December 1928, he passed the assessor's examination and first worked as an advocate in Pforzheim. From 1930 he also lectured in patent law.

In 1932, he habilitated at Technical University Karlsruhe. In 1940, the University appointed him extraordinary professor for industrial property and copyright.

From 1945 to 1948, he worked as the lawyer of a paper factory owned by his in-laws. In 1948 he opened a new law firm in Freiburg.

After 1950, he lectured at the Albert-Ludwigs-University in Freiburg.

== German politics ==
In 1952, Furler joined the Christian-Democratic Union and was soon elected chairman of the economic council of the party's Baden branch.

Furler was a member of the Bundestag from 1953 until 1972, representing the constituency of Offenburg. From 1953 to 1957, he was vice chairman of the "committee for industrial property and copyright". In 1957, he briefly chaired the "special committee "common market/EURATOM. From 1959 to 1960, he was chairman of the "committee of foreign affairs".

== European politics ==
From 1955 to 1973, he was also a member of the precursors to the European Parliament, first of the Common Assembly of the European Coal and Steel Community (1955–1958) and then of the European Parliamentary Assembly of the European Communities (1958–1973). He served as president of these bodies from 1956 to 1958 and from 1960 to 1962 and as vice president from 1962 to 1973.

From 1958 to 1966, he was President of the German Council of the European Movement.

== Death ==
Furler died on 29 June 1975 in Achern.

== Selected works ==
- Das polizeiliche Notrecht und die Entschädigungspflicht des Staates, Diss.jur., Heidelberg 1928
- "Parlamente über den Nationen. Entwicklung, Zustand und Aussichten in Europa", in: Die Politische Meinung, 1957, Heft 11, pp. 17–28.
- Reden und Aufsätze 1953–1957 (undated)
- Im neuen Europa. Erlebnisse und Erfahrungen im Europäischen Parlament, Frankfurt/Main 1963
