= Young Liberals (Germany) =

Political youth organization

Young Liberals Junge Liberale (JuLis)
- Chairman: Finn Flebbe
- Vice-Chairperson: Jelger Tosch; Julia Helh; Pascal schejnoa
- Founded: 1980
- Headquarters: Berlin
- Membership: 15,000
- Ideology: Liberalism; European federalism
- Position: Centre-right
- Mother party: Free Democratic Party
- International affiliation: IFLRY, LYMEC
- Magazine: j+l
- Website: julis.de

The Young Liberals (German: Junge Liberale, JuLis), is a political youth organisation in Germany. It is the financially and organisationally independent youth wing of the Free Democratic Party (FDP). The JuLis claim about 15,000 members, making it the third largest youth organisation in Germany.

== Political profile ==
The current policy statement of JuLis was passed in 2008. It is a revision of the 1994 policy statement and is titled “Humanistic Liberalism – Thought for the Future.” It focuses on the market economy and civil liberties, and is supplemented by the democratic resolutions of regular congresses.

The political objectives of JuLis largely align with those of the FDP, though they often differ in detail. it advocates for civil liberties, sociopolitics, and an ecologically sustainable social market economy. They emphasize political freedom, self-responsibility, equal opportunity, deregulation, and limiting the state’s influence to its core competences, such as preventing economic cartels.

As of 2025, veteran Finn Flebbe serves as chairman

== History ==
The JuLis were founded in 1980, and was recognized as the official FDP youth wing in 1983. Prior to 1982, Jungdemokraten (Young Democrats) had been the FDP youth organisation.

== Persons ==
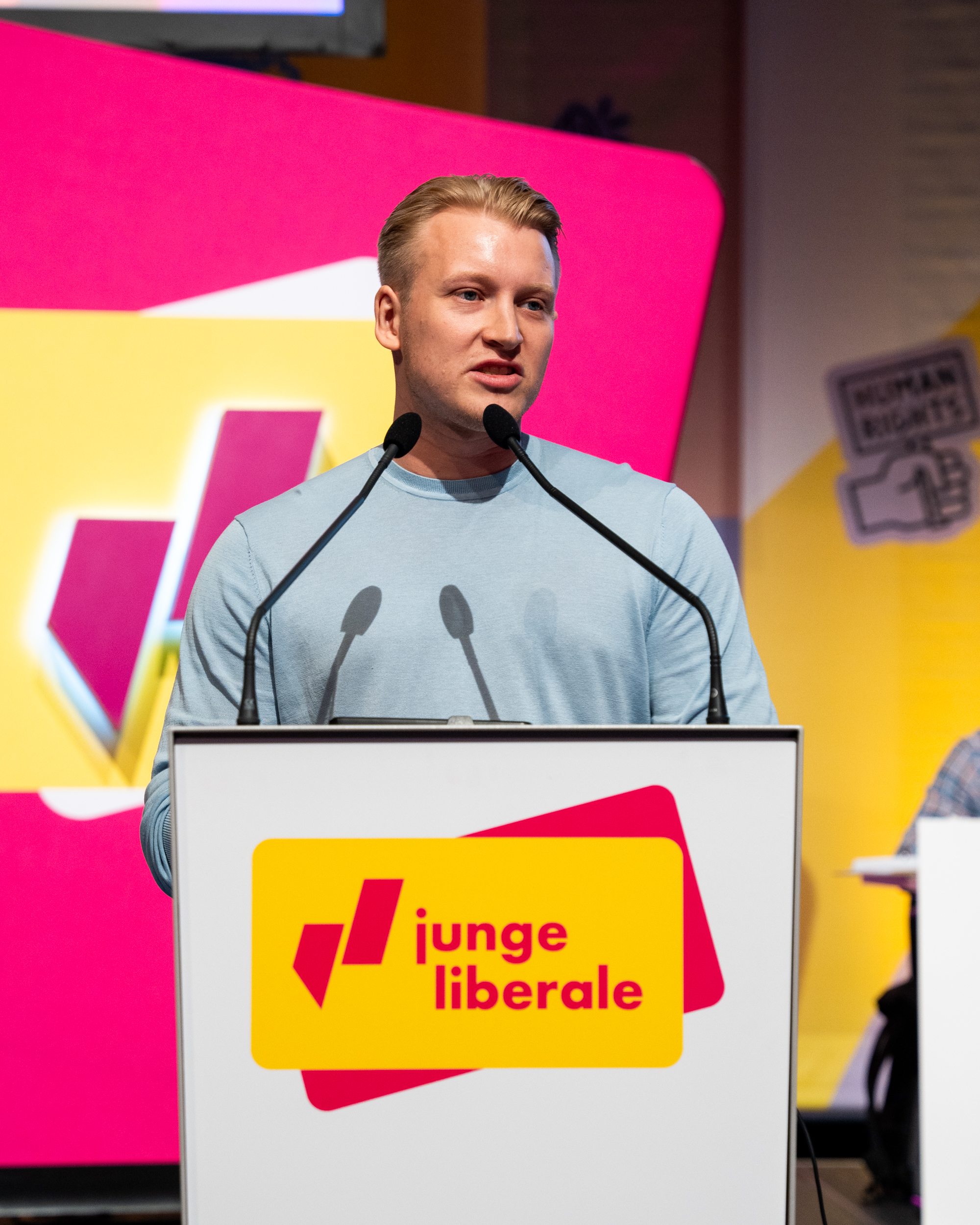
Incumbent Chairman Finn Flebbe

=== Chairpersons ===
- Hans-Joachim Otto (1980–1983)
- Guido Westerwelle (1983–1988)
- Georg Neubauer (1988–1989)
- Hermann Brem (1989)
- Birgit Homburger (1990–1993)
- Ralph Lange (1993–1995)
- Michael Kauch (1995–1999)
- Daniel Bahr (1999–2004)
- Jan Dittrich (2004–2005)
- Johannes Vogel (2005–2010)
- Lasse Becker (2010–2013)
- Alexander Hahn (2013–2014)
- Konstantin Kuhle (2014–2018)
- Ria Schröder (2018–2020)
- Jens Teutrine (2020–2021)
- Franziska Brandmann (2021–2025)
- Finn Flebbe (2025–present)

== International relations ==
The JuLis is a full member organisation of the European Liberal Youth (LYMEC), a pan-European umbrella of liberal youth organisations. On the international level, the JuLis are the German member of the International Federation of Liberal Youth (IFLRY).
