= Jens Teutrine =

German politician (born 1993)

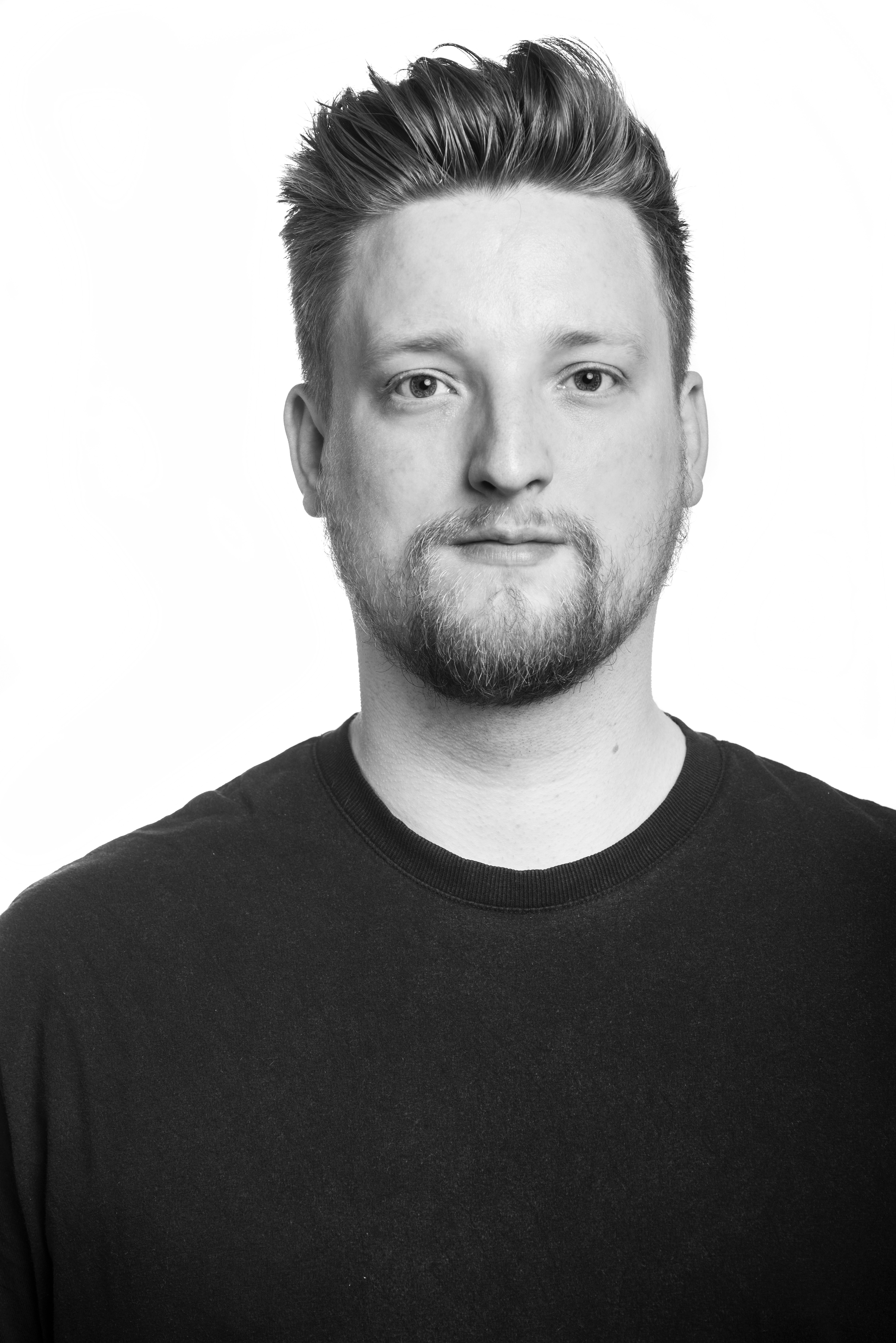

Member of the Bundestag
- In office 2021–2025

Personal details
- Born: 22 October 1993 (age 32) Gütersloh, Germany
- Party: FDP
- Education: Bielefeld University

Jens Teutrine (born 1993) is a German politician of the Free Democratic Party (FDP) who served as a member of the Bundestag from 2021 to 2025, representing the Herford – Minden-Lübbecke II district. From 2020 until 2021 he served as the chairman of the party's youth organisation, the Young Liberals (Julis).

== Early life and education ==
As of 2020, Teutrine studies philosophy and social sciences at Bielefeld University.

== Political career ==
Teutrine was elected to the board of the Free Democratic Party in 2021.

In the negotiations to form a so-called traffic light coalition of the Social Democratic Party (SPD), the Green Party and the FDP following the 2021 federal elections, Teutrine was part of his party's delegation in the working group on children, youth and families, co-chaired by Serpil Midyatli, Katrin Göring-Eckardt and Stephan Thomae.

In parliament, Teutrine served on the Committee on Labour and Social Affairs and the Parliamentary Advisory Board on Sustainable Development since 2022.
