= Sibylle Laurischk =

German politician

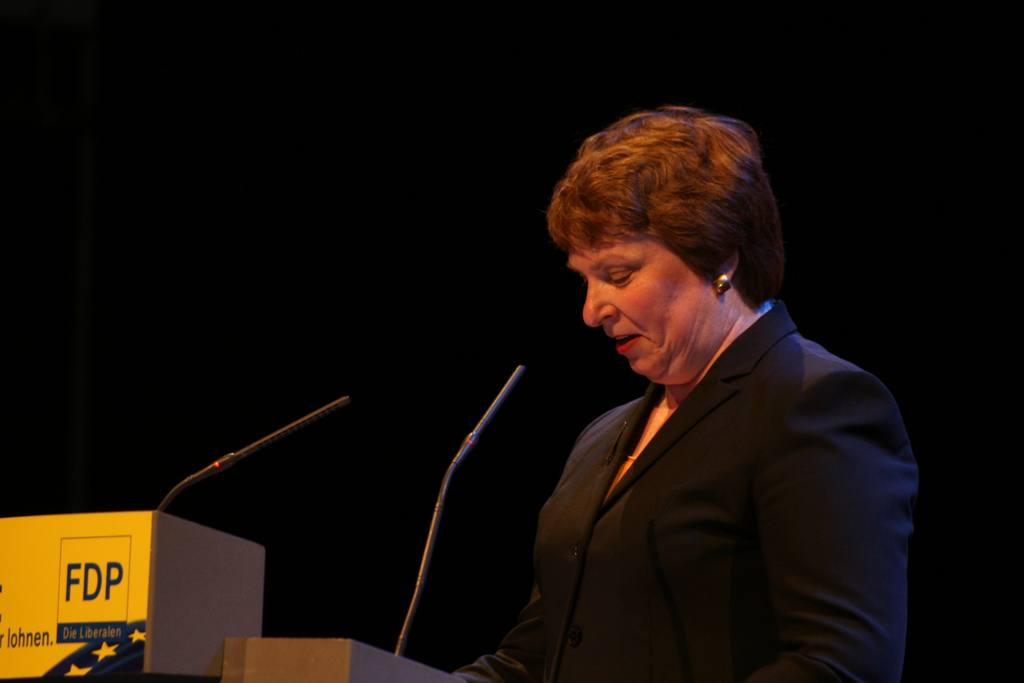
- Born: 12 December 1954; Offenburg, Baden-Württemberg, Germany
- Died: 22 May 2020 (aged 65); Offenburg, Baden-Württemberg, Germany
- Occupation: Politician
- Political party: Free Democratic Party

Sibylle Laurischk (12 December 1954 – 22 May 2020) was a German politician from the Free Democratic Party. She served as member of the Bundestag between 2005 and 2013.

== Life and Profession ==
After graduating from high school in 1973 at the Oken-Gymnasium in Offenburg, Sibylle Laurischk completed a law degree at the Ruprecht-Karls-Universität Heidelberg, which she completed in 1978 with the first state examination in law. After completing her legal clerkship and the second state examination in 1981, she then worked for the auditing company KPMG . Since 1984 she has been working as an independent lawyer in Offenburg.

Sibylle Laurischk was a Protestant, divorced and the mother of three children.

== Politics ==
Since 1990 she was a member of the FDP. Since 1998 she has been deputy chairwoman of the FDP district association in South Baden and from 2003 to 2010 she was chairwoman of the FDP district association in Ortenaukreis .

Sibylle Laurischk has been deputy state chairwoman of the Liberal Women in Baden-Württemberg since 2003 and was chairwoman of the Federal Association of Liberal Women from 2006 to 2008, and deputy chairwoman since 2008.

Sibylle Laurischk was a member of the city council of her hometown Offenburg from 1994 to 2014 and sat in the district council of the Ortenau district from 2004 to 2009 . From 2002 to 2013 she was a member of the German Bundestag . Here she was spokeswoman for the FDP parliamentary group for senior citizens and civic engagement as well as for integration and migration .

Sibylle Laurischk always entered the Bundestag via the Baden-Württemberg state list .

On November 12, 2009 Sibylle Laurischk was appointed chairman of the committee for family, senior citizens, women and youth for the 17th legislative period .

For the general election in 2013 it did not run.

== Membership ==
Laurischk was a member of the European Union parliamentary group of the German Bundestag .
