= The Great Mother =

1955 book by Erich Neumann

The Great Mother An Analysis of the Archetype
- Author: Erich Neumann
- Original title: Die große Mutter. Der Archetyp des grossen Weiblichen
- Translator: Ralph Manheim
- Language: German
- Subject: Mother goddesses, Feminine archetypes
- Publisher: Bollingen Foundation, Princeton University Press
- Publication date: 1955, 2d ed. 1963, 2015
- Publication place: Switzerland, Israel
- Media type: Print (Hardcover and Paperback)
- Pages: 379 text + 185 plates
- ISBN: 0-691-01780-8 (paperback); 0-691-09742-9 (hardcover)
- LC Class: 55-10026

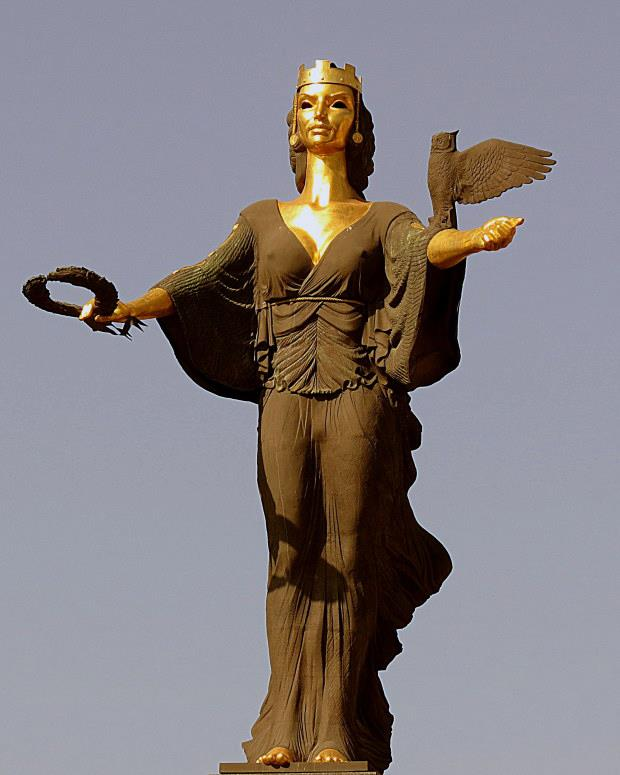
Sophia, a positive Anima figure of the Great Mother. (A recent statue of Santa Sofia in Sofia, Bulgaria.)

The Great Mother: An Analysis of the Archetype (German: Die große Mutter. Der Archetyp des grossen Weiblichen) is a depth psychology study of the Great Mother archetype, as it appears throughout history, mythology, religion, and culture, by the psychologist Erich Neumann. The dedication reads, "To C. G. Jung friend and master in his eightieth year". Although Neumann completed the German manuscript in Israel in 1951, The Great Mother was first published in English in 1955.

== Summary ==
=== Great Round of female archetypes ===
Neumann’s Great Mother presents a diagrammatic model ("Schema III"), known as the Great Round, to illustrate the dynamic nature of the feminine archetype in psychological development. This structure is not a religious typology but a depth psychology schema representing the evolutionary and ambivalent nature of the feminine archetype in mythology, culture, and the psyche.

At the outer rim of the Great Round, Neumann places archetypal figures drawn from mythology and world religions, representing universal psychological forces rather than fixed deities of any single tradition. To illustrate, Neumann presents six archetypes in his mandala diagram Schema III. Several figures each are opposites of the Mother archetype and of the Anima archetype respectively (these axes intersect forming an X at the center), the two Feminine figures above and below signify positive and negative transformation:

             Mary

   Isis                 Sophia

              X

  Lilith                 Kali

          the witches

A mandala, as symbol of a numinous nature, impresses beholders with the "transcendental order of the unconscious" and fosters "ritual circumambulation". The lower quadrant although described as "negative" in a developmental sense, cannot be an absolute moral judgment, e.g., both Kali and Lilith can embody creative and destructive forces simultaneously. Neumann also cautions that each archetype in the Great Round is fluid and multidimensional, shifting depending on psychological context and personal integration.

Anticipating criticism, Neumann explicitly warned that this schema is reductionist, meant for conceptual clarity rather than rigid classification. Each of these figures is to be regarded as ambivalent, overlapping, and transformative, as archetypal structures are not fixed but evolve over time. Neumann describes these figures as dynamic energies that can shift or reverse into their opposites, depending on psychological and cultural influences. Neumann’s analysis is both historical and psychological, incorporating traditional mythological interpretations while exploring their manifestation in individual and collective psychology. He argues that in-depth psychological work involves integrating these archetypal forces, rather than abstractly repressing or idealizing them.

Axis	Positive Pole	Negative Pole
Mother Axis (Nurture vs. Devouring)	Isis (life, birth, rebirth)	Kali (destruction, death, chaos)
Anima Axis (Spiritual vs. Instinctual)	Sophia (wisdom, vision, inspiration)	Lilith (ecstasy, madness, impotence)
Feminine Axis (Aware vs. Asleep)	Mary (spiritual transformation)	Witches (ensnaring, stupor)

- Kali, the terrible Mother (sickness, dismemberment, death, extinction); and the Gorgon.
- Lilith, the negative Anima (ecstasy, madness, impotence, stupor, ecstasy); and Circe.
- the witches, negative change, as in a fairy-tale witch; also: the Furies.
- Isis, the good Mother (fruit, birth, rebirth, immortality); also: Demeter and Ishtar (Inanna).
- Sophia, the positive Anima (wisdom, vision, inspiration), the Muse; also: Maat.
- Mary (enlightenment, beatific ascent, compassion); also: Kwan-Yin (Avalokiteśvara).

These female figures are not of precise attributes, nor rigid, fixed characteristics, but are changeable, as explained both objectively by religious history, and subjectively by archetypal psychology. Hence, there is overlap in the Great Round positions.

=== The Development of Feminine Archetypes and Consciousness ===
Following the theme of his The Origins and History of Consciousness (1949; 1954), Neumann tracks the development of feminine archetypes from their original uroboros, a symbol of primordial unconsciousness, which forms the symbolic matrix of the Great Round. These archetypes undergo differentiation, leading to the formation of new symbolic constellations (as briefly introduced above). "The psychological development [of humankind]... begins with the 'matriarchal' stage in which the archetype of the Great Mother dominates and the unconscious directs the psychic process of the individual and the group." Eventually, from the symbolic Great Round, new psychic constellations are differentiated out and become articulated in the culture, e.g., the Eleusinian Mysteries.

In ancient cultures, the emergence of structured spiritual transformation provided pathways for the gradual differentiation of ego-consciousness from the collective unconscious. This process caused the rise of consciousness, which emerged through semi-unconscious collective processes, becoming embedded in cultural institutions such as initiatory rituals and mystery traditions. Over time, more individualized paths emerged, further advancing this process.

== Neumann’s Psychological Interpretation of Bachofen ==
Neumann praised Johann Jakob Bachofen in a 1930s manuscript, later published, calling Bachofen "a treasure chest of psychological knowledge" if "interpreted symbolically and not historically". Bachofen's Das Mutterrecht (1861) (Mother Right: an investigation of the religious and juridical character of matriarchy in the Ancient World) was highly influential upon publication. However, Bachofen's theory of "female dominated epochs" did not survive scrutiny and was "criticized and rejected by most contemporary historians". Neumann, following the critical scholarship, viewed Bachofen not as a cultural historian of an ancient matriarchy, but as a key figure in the psychological study of symbolic femininity.

While acknowledging the rejection of Bachofen's historical claims, Neumann, along with Jung, engaged in an effort "to rescue Bachofen's concept of an age of gynaecocracy through a psychological revision." Expanding on Jung's work on the mother archetype, Neumann’s Die Grosse Mutter (1951) reflected this approach, incorporating a wide range of mythological and artistic representations and drawing on Eranos’s extensive collection of female archetype illustrations. Given the historical debate over Bachofen’s theories, Jungian scholar Hans Thomas Liebscher later cautioned that Neumann’s work should be "read not as a contribution to a failed ancient cult of the Goddess but as an exemplary study of archetypal psychology."

== Reception ==
Jungian analyst Robert H. Hopcke calls The Great Mother "monumental in its breadth" and considers it "Neumann's most enduring contribution to Jungian thought," alongside The Origins and History of Consciousness (1949).

Scholar Martin Liebscher writes that "Neumann's The Great Mother provided a watershed moment in the way archetypal studies would be conducted." Liebscher argued that previous monographs on specific archetypes, "could not compete with the minute detail and careful structuring of Neumann's examination of the Great Mother archetype."

Jungian scholar, Siegmund Hurwitz, draws on The Great Mother in his exploration of female archetypes, highlighting Neumann’s distinction between the mother figure and the anima as separate psychological archetypes.

Cultural critic Camille Paglia describes The Great Mother as "a visual feast" and "Neumann’s most renowned work." She credits the book with influencing her understanding of feminine archetypes in art and literature, particularly in her study of symbolic imagery in Sexual Personae (1990).
