= Sexual Personae =

1990 book by Camille Paglia

Sexual Personae: Art and Decadence from Nefertiti to Emily Dickinson
- Cover of the first edition
- Author: Camille Paglia
- Cover artist: Louise Fili
- Language: English
- Subject: The Decadent movement Paganism in art Apollonian/Dionysian opposition Sexual archetypes
- Publisher: Yale University Press
- Publication date: 1990
- Publication place: United States
- Media type: Print (Hardcover and Paperback)
- Pages: 712
- ISBN: 978-0-300-04396-9
- OCLC: 317289655

Sexual Personae: Art and Decadence from Nefertiti to Emily Dickinson is a 1990 work about sexual decadence in Western literature and the visual arts by scholar Camille Paglia, in which she addresses major artists and writers such as Donatello, Sandro Botticelli, Leonardo da Vinci, Edmund Spenser, William Shakespeare, Johann Wolfgang von Goethe, Samuel Taylor Coleridge, Lord Byron, Emily Brontë, and Oscar Wilde. Following Friedrich Nietzsche, Paglia argues that the primary conflict in Western culture is between the binary forces of the Apollonian and Dionysian, Apollo being associated with order, symmetry, culture, rationality, and sky, and Dionysus with disorder, chaos, nature, emotion, and earth. The book became a bestseller, and was praised by numerous literary critics, although it also received critical reviews from numerous feminist scholars.

== Background ==
It was intended to please no one and to offend everyone.

— Camille Paglia

Paglia's discovery of Simone de Beauvoir's The Second Sex in 1963 inspired her to write a book larger in scope. Sexual Personae began to take shape in essays Paglia wrote in college between 1964 and 1968. The title was inspired by Ingmar Bergman's film Persona, which Paglia saw on its American release in 1968. The book was finished in 1981, but was rejected by seven major New York publishers before being released by Yale University Press in 1990. Paglia credits editor Ellen Graham with securing Yale's decision to publish the book. Sexual Personae's original preface was removed at the Yale editors' suggestion because of the book's extreme length, but was later published in Paglia's essay collection Sex, Art, and American Culture (1992).

Paglia describes Sexual Personae's method as psychoanalytic and acknowledges a debt to Sigmund Freud and Carl Jung. Her other major influences were Sir James George Frazer's The Golden Bough (1890), Jane Harrison's Prolegomena to the Study of Greek Religion (1903), Oswald Spengler's The Decline of the West (1918), D. H. Lawrence's Women in Love (1920), Sándor Ferenczi's Thalassa (1924), the works of literary critics G. Wilson Knight and Harold Bloom, Erich Neumann's The Great Mother (1955) and The Origins and History of Consciousness (1949), Kenneth Clark's The Nude (1956), Gaston Bachelard's The Poetics of Space (1958), Norman O. Brown's Life Against Death (1959) and Love's Body (1966), and Leslie Fiedler's Love and Death in the American Novel (1960). Paglia also acknowledges astrology as an influence.

Paglia said of the book, "It was intended to please no one and to offend everyone. The entire process of the book was to discover the repressed elements of contemporary culture, whatever they are, and palpate them. One of the main premises was to demonstrate that pornography is everywhere in major art. Art history as written is completely sex free, repressive and puritanical. I want precision and historical knowledge, but at the same time, I try to zap it with pornographic intensity."

== Summary ==
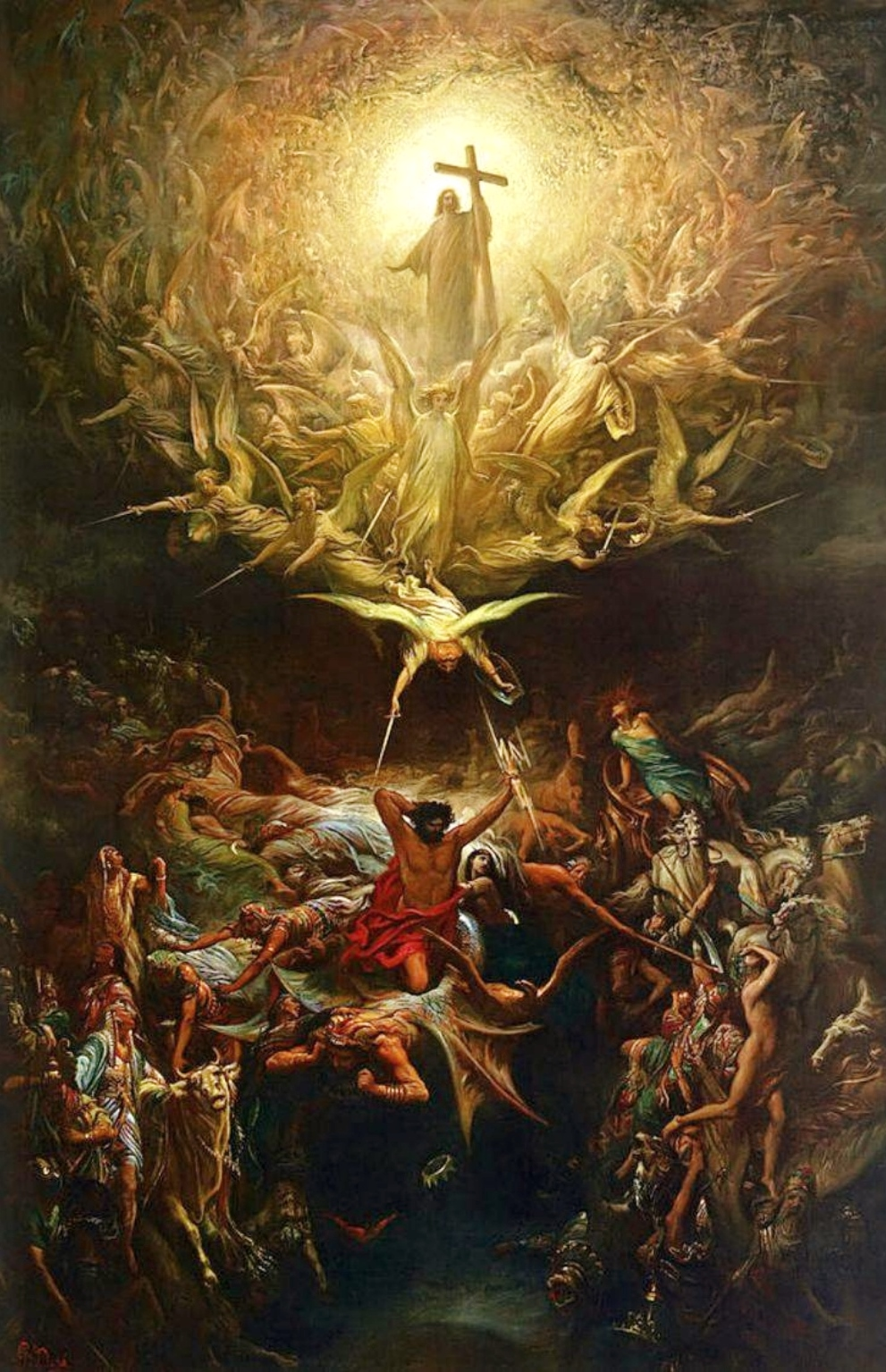
The Triumph of Christianity over Paganism (1868) by Gustave Doré. In Sexual Personae, Paglia argues that Christianity never defeated paganism.

Paglia seeks to demonstrate "the unity and continuity of western culture". Accepting the canonical Western tradition, she "rejects the modernist idea that culture has collapsed into meaningless fragments". Paglia argues that Christianity did not destroy paganism, and that paganism flourishes in art, eroticism, astrology, and popular culture. She examines antiquity, the Renaissance, and Romanticism from the late eighteenth century to 1900, contending that "Romanticism turns almost immediately into Decadence". She argues that the "amorality, aggression, sadism, voyeurism, and pornography in great art have been ignored or glossed over by most academic critics" and that sex and nature are "brutal pagan forces". She also stresses the truth in sexual stereotypes and the biological basis of sexual difference, noting that her stance is "sure to cause controversy". Paglia sees the mother as an overwhelming force who condemns men to lifelong sexual anxiety, from which they fleetingly escape through rationalism and physical achievement.

Portraying Western culture as a struggle between a phallic-oriented sky-religion ("Sky Cult") on the one hand and chthonic-oriented earth-religion ("Earth Cult") on the other, Paglia draws on the Greco-Roman polarity between the Apollonian and Dionysian. She associates Apollo with order, structure, and symmetry, and Dionysus with chaos, disorder, and nature. She analyzes literature and art on the premise that the primary conflict in Western culture has always been between these forces. In her view, the major patterns of continuity in Western culture originate in paganism. Other sources of the culture's continuity in her view include androgyny, sadism, and an aggressive "western eye", which seeks to refine and dominate nature's ceaseless hostility and has created our art and cinema. Paglia criticizes feminists for sentimentality or wishful thinking about the causes of rape, violence, and poor relations between the sexes.

Paglia asserts the importance of patriarchy in the development of civilization, and claims that "Athens became great not despite but because of its misogyny".

In one of the most controversial passages in the book, she grounds her claim in what effectively amounts to the variability hypothesis in evolutionary psychology:

Serial or sex murder, like fetishism, is a perversion of male intelligence. It is a criminal abstraction, masculine in its deranged egoism and orderliness. It is the asocial equivalent of philosophy, mathematics and music. There is no female Mozart because there is no female Jack the Ripper.

Another explanation for this asymmetry adopts a more conflicted tone:

Male conspiracy cannot explain all female failures. I am convinced that, even without restrictions, there still would have been no female Pascal, Milton, or Kant. Genius is not checked by social obstacles: it will overcome. Men's egotism, so disgusting in the talentless, is the source of their greatness as a sex. [...] Even now, with all vocations open, I marvel at the rarity of the woman driven by artistic or intellectual obsession, that self-mutilating derangement of social relationship which, in its alternate forms of crime and ideation, is the disgrace and glory of the human species.

The "sexual personae" of Paglia's title include the female vampire (Medusa, Lauren Bacall); the pythoness (the Delphic Oracle, Gracie Allen); the beautiful boy (Hadrian's Antinous, Dorian Gray); the epicene man of beauty (Byron, Elvis Presley); and the male heroine (the passive male sufferer; for example, the old men in William Wordsworth's poetry).

Paglia discusses the work of writers including Spenser, Shakespeare, Jean-Jacques Rousseau, the Marquis de Sade, Goethe, William Blake, Wordsworth, Coleridge, Byron, Percy Bysshe Shelley, John Keats, Honoré de Balzac, Théophile Gautier, Charles Baudelaire, Joris-Karl Huysmans, Brontë, Algernon Charles Swinburne, Walter Pater, Oscar Wilde, Edgar Allan Poe, Nathaniel Hawthorne, Herman Melville, Ralph Waldo Emerson, Walt Whitman, Henry James, and Emily Dickinson. The works of literature Paglia analyzes include Spenser's The Faerie Queene, Shakespeare's As You Like It and Antony and Cleopatra, Goethe's Wilhelm Meister's Apprenticeship, Coleridge's Rime of the Ancient Mariner and Christabel, Byron's Don Juan, Brontë's Wuthering Heights, and Wilde's The Importance of Being Earnest and The Picture of Dorian Gray.

Works of art to which Paglia applies her analysis of the Western canon include the Venus of Willendorf, the Nefertiti Bust, Ancient Greek sculpture, Donatello's David, Botticelli's Birth of Venus and Primavera, da Vinci's Mona Lisa and The Virgin and Child with St. Anne.

Paglia questions the sociologist Max Weber's definition of charisma, according to which charisma must be manifested in heroic deeds or miracles, writing that she sees charisma as "the numinous aura around a narcissistic personality" and "the radiance produced by the interaction of male and female elements in a gifted personality", rather than something dependent upon "acts or external effects".

== Reception ==
=== Feminist responses ===
Sexual Personae received critical reviews from numerous feminist scholars. Robin Ann Sheets wrote that Paglia "takes a profoundly anti-feminist stance". Molly Ivins wrote a critical review of Sexual Personae, accusing Paglia of historical inaccuracy, egocentrism, and writing in sweeping generalizations. Teresa Ebert denounced the book as "deeply misogynist and rancorous" in the Women's Review of Books, writing that Paglia uses a biological basis to "justify male domination, violence, and superiority in Western culture". English professor Sandra Gilbert described Sexual Personae as "markedly monomaniacal ... bloated, repetitious" and "awkwardly written", adding that it is "so 'essentialist' as to outbiologize even Freud". Gilbert accused Paglia of "vulgar homophobia" and said she deserved "moral contempt" and "loathes liberalism, egalitarianism, feminism, and Mother Nature". Martha Duffy wrote that the book had a "neoconservative cultural message" that was well-received, but rejected by many feminists. Beth Loffreda censured Paglia, writing, "She garners most of her publicity by loudly and nastily proclaiming everyone wrong on the sensitive issues of gender, sexuality and rape." She concluded, "Hers is a seductiveness of simple answers, of clear narratives, of motivations and actions traced solely to a biological origin—a place stripped of the complex ambiguities, the complex interactions of self, skin, group, and institutions that make up daily life." The critic Mary Rose Kasraie wrote, "Paglia gives no indication she has read any studies related to women, or recent studies about imagination, nature and culture" and had "terrible gaps in her coverage". Kasraie called the work "distractingly antischolarly" and "an unacademic wallow in Sadean sadomasochistic chthonian nature".

Judy Simons criticized Paglia's "potentially sinister political agenda" and decried her "intellectual sleight of hand". Germaine Greer wrote that Paglia's insights into Sappho are "vivid and extremely perceptive", but also "unfortunately inconsistent and largely incompatible with each other". Professor Alison Booth called Sexual Personae an "anti-feminist cosmogony". Literary scholar Marianne Noble wrote that Paglia misread sadomasochism in Dickinson's poetry, that "Paglia's absolute belief in biological determinism leads her to pronouncements about female nature that are not only detestable but dangerous, because they routinely receive serious widespread attention in the contemporary culture at large", and that Paglia "derives appalling social conclusions".

Maya Oppenheim of The Independent called Sexual Personae a "seminal feminist work". Paglia wrote in Free Women, Free Men (2017) that "academic and establishment feminists" made "vicious attacks" on the book, in most cases without reading it, and that these attacks will stand as "an indictment of the sorry process by which important political movements can undermine themselves through the blind insularity of their ruling coteries".

=== General response ===
The critic Helen Vendler gave Sexual Personae a negative review in The New York Review of Books, writing that while Paglia could be "enlightening and entertaining" when dealing with a subject congenial to her, she failed in her discussions of subjects that demanded more than appreciation of images and stories. In response to a letter of protest from Paglia, Vendler denied that Sexual Personae contained poetry criticism. The critic Terry Teachout, in The New York Times, called Sexual Personae flawed but "every bit as intellectually stimulating as it is exasperating". The novelist Anthony Burgess called Sexual Personae a "fine, disturbing book. It seeks to attack the reader's emotions as well as his/her prejudices. It is very learned. Each sentence jabs like a needle". Harold Bloom wrote, "Sexual Personae will be an enormous sensation of a book, in all of the better senses of 'sensation'. There is no book comparable in scope, stance, design, or insight. It compels us to rethink the question of the literary representation of human sexuality." In The American Religion (1992), Bloom called it a "masterwork" and credited Paglia with a "shrewd and alarming sexual definition of charisma", though he also wrote that its "powerful sexual reductiveness ... necessarily produces distortions when applied to the personality of any prophet whosoever".

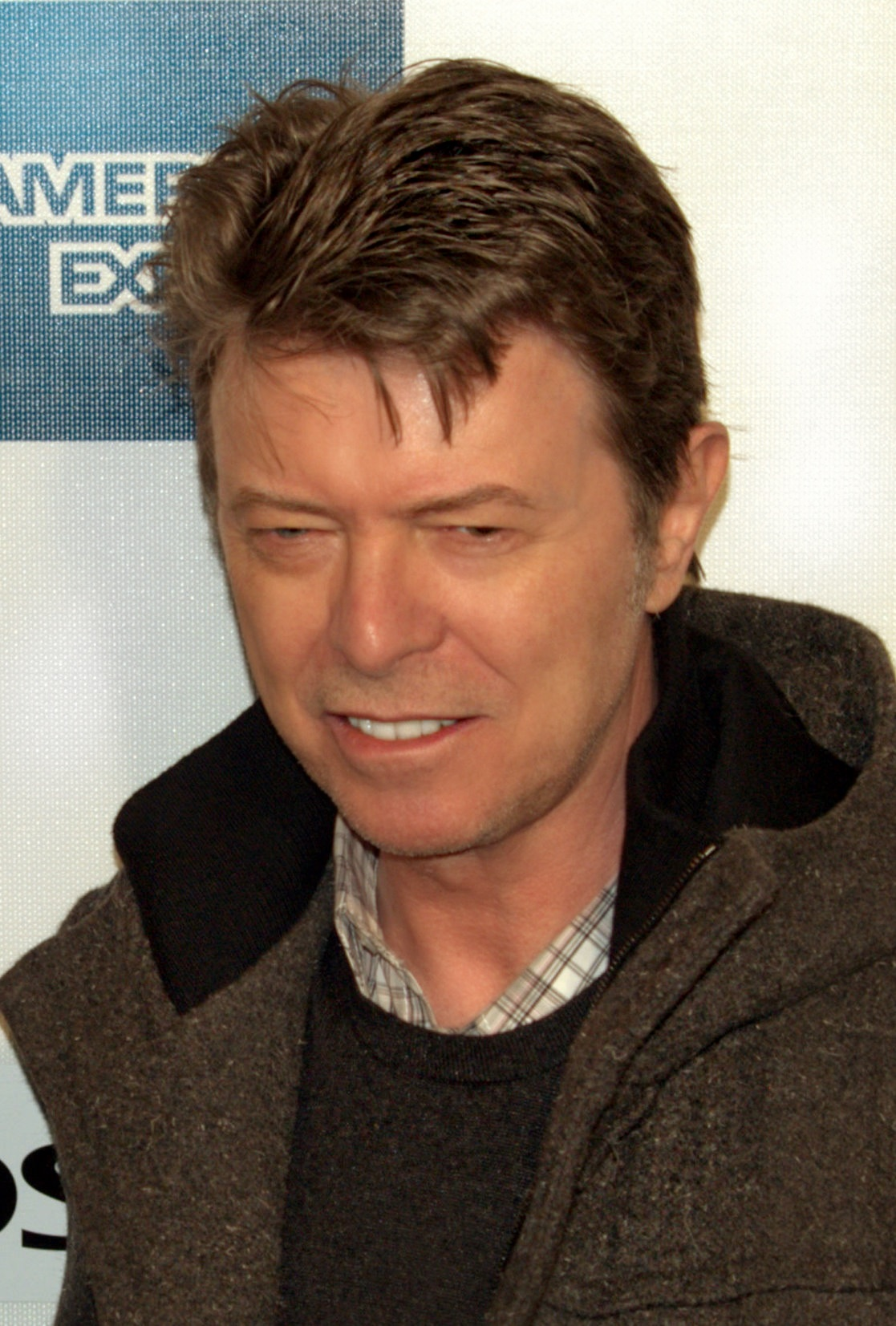
David Bowie listed Sexual Personae among his favourite books.

Valerie Steele wrote, "Paglia has been attacked as an academic conservative, in league with Allan Bloom and other defenders of the 'Western canon', but no conservative would be so explicitly approving of pornography, homosexuality, and rock-and-roll." The literature professor Robert Alter wrote in Arion, "[O]n purely stylistic grounds, this is one of the few thoroughly enjoyable works of criticism written in the American language in the last couple of decades". He called the book "immensely ambitious, vastly erudite, feisty, often outrageous, and sometimes dazzlingly brilliant". Pat Righelato concluded, "Camille Paglia's syncretic theoretical enterprise invoking Frazer, Freud, Nietzsche, and Bloom, from anthropology to influence theory and psychobiography, is an immense tour de force."

Gerald Gillespie called Sexual Personae "vigorous and capacious", and wrote of Paglia, "Her passion for her subject matter [...] radiates as a beacon of hope for the survival of the Western heritage beyond the current Babylonian captivity of the American academy". Christina Hoff Sommers wrote in Who Stole Feminism? (1994) that Sexual Personae should have led to Paglia being "acknowledged as an outstanding woman scholar even by those who take strong exception to her unfashionable views", and criticized the Women's Review of Books for calling the book "crackpot extremism" and feminist professors at Connecticut College for comparing it to Adolf Hitler's Mein Kampf. The classical scholar Bruce Thornton called it "wild and brilliant", adding, "Even when she's wrong, Paglia is more interesting than any dozen poststructuralist clerks."

The novelist John Updike wrote that Sexual Personae "feels less a survey than a curiously ornate harangue. Her percussive style—one short declarative sentence after another—eventually wearies the reader; her diction functions not so much to elicit the secrets of books as to hammer them into submission... The weary reader longs for the mercy of a qualification, a doubt, a hesitation; there is little sense, in her uncompanionable prose, of exploration occurring before our eyes, of tentative motions of thought reflected in a complex syntax". The jurist Richard Posner called Sexual Personae "an insightful book, written in a lively manner, though opinionated, uneven, and often difficult to follow", and compared it to Allan Bloom's The Closing of the American Mind (1987), writing that they are both examples of "difficult academic works that mysteriously strike a chord with a broad public". The anthropologist Melvin Konner wrote that Sexual Personae is "a powerful account of gender as depicted in Western art and literature". In 2013, the singer David Bowie listed Sexual Personae among his 100 favorite books.

Sexual Personae was re-released by Australian publishing house Scribe Publications in Australia and the United Kingdom in August 2026.

== See also ==
- Womb envy – related feminist concept
- Decadence – a recurring theme in Paglia's analysis of art and culture
- *Dyḗus ph₂tḗr and *Dʰéǵʰōm in Proto-Indo-European mythology
- Tengrism – its core entities are Sky Father (Tenger Etseg) and Earth Mother (Umay Ana)
- List of fertility deities
- The Birth of Tragedy
