= The Origins and History of Consciousness =

1949 book by Erich Neumann

- Cover of the first edition
- Author: Erich Neumann
- Original title: Ursprungsgeschichte des Bewusstseins
- Translator: R. F. C. Hull
- Language: German
- Subject: Consciousness
- Publisher: Rascher Verlag, Princeton University Press
- Publication date: 1949
- Publication place: Germany
- English publication date: 1954
- Media type: Print (Hardcover and Paperback)
- Pages: 493 (English edition)
- ISBN: 978-0691163598
- LC Class: 53-12527

The Origins and History of Consciousness (German: Ursprungsgeschichte des Bewusstseins) is a 1949 book by analytical psychologist Erich Neumann, in which the author "[outlines] the archetypal stages in the development of consciousness". It was first published in English in 1954 in a translation by R. F. C. Hull. Carl Jung wrote the introduction, describing it as an extension of his own research into archetypes and individuation.

== Summary ==
Neumann describes The Origins and History of Consciousness as an effort to "outline the archetypal stages in the development of consciousness," building on depth psychology, particularly Carl Jung’s analytical psychology. The book expands on the theory that human cognition is fundamentally symbolic, tracing the psychological processes behind the initial emergence and ongoing expansion of higher-order consciousness. He examines the transition of consciousness from a primal state of undifferentiated unconsciousness, where the self is merged with instinctual drives and collective patterns, to a clearly differentiated ego-consciousness, characterized by self-awareness and the capacity for reflection. Mythological symbols such as the Great Mother and the Hero archetype illustrate key turning points in the development of individual and collective consciousness. Neumann argues that human psychological growth involves progressively differentiating unconscious contents through symbolic mediators such as myths, rituals, and cultural practices, which give rise to structured forms of personal identity, morality, and abstract thought. This symbolic mediation fosters the emergence, integration, and continuous refinement of self-awareness.

Neumann expands on Jung’s theories by examining how archetypes symbolize crucial stages in the development of consciousness. He discusses the emergence of ego-consciousness from a primal, matriarchal (Eros) state of participation mystique, which is characterized by unconscious fusion with the world, to a patriarchal (Logos) stage of differentiated ego-awareness, where an individual attains clear boundaries and self-reflective capacity. Neumann argues this transition from symbolic maternal containment to heroic independence is essential for psychological growth and individuation.

Carl Jung provided the foreword for the book, endorsing Neumann’s work as a direct continuation of Jung's work and an important contribution to analytical psychology. Jung particularly praised Neumann for extending archetypal theory into a coherent developmental model, emphasizing the Great Mother and the ouroboros symbols as critical representations of early, undifferentiated states of consciousness.

== Publication history ==
The Origins and History of Consciousness was first published in 1949 by Rascher Verlag. In 1954, it was published in R. F. C. Hull's English translation by Princeton University Press.

== Reception ==
The psychologist James Hillman critiqued Neumann’s structural model of consciousness, arguing that his "Apollonic" framework led him to assume a linear, hierarchical progression of psychological development. Hillman also took issue with Neumann’s claim that "consciousness as such is masculine even in women," seeing it as a product of Neumann’s rigid dualism between masculine and feminine elements of the psyche.

The philosopher Walter Kaufmann dismissed The Origins and History of Consciousness as an example of what he saw as "tedious, pointless erudition" in archetypal psychology, accusing Neumann of being dogmatic and uncritical of alternative explanations. Kaufmann argued that Neumann relied on "a notion of evidence" similar to theological reasoning, comparing his use of mythology to the way theologians cite scripture.

Literary critic Camille Paglia described the book as "Jungianism at its learned best" and identified it as her personal favorite among Neumann’s works. She credited Neumann with influencing her study of archetypes in art and literature in Sexual Personae (1990). However, she described his concept of "centroversion" as "idiosyncratic," suggesting that it diverged from conventional Jungian thought in its emphasis on integration rather than opposition.

Jungian analyst Robert H. Hopcke called The Origins and History of Consciousness, along with The Great Mother (1955), "Neumann’s most enduring contribution to Jungian thought." He also noted that Neumann’s views on homosexuality were largely consistent with Jung’s and were not intended to present a new theory.

Psychiatrist Anthony Stevens described the book as "a great but misguided work," critiquing Neumann’s assumptions about the biological evolution of consciousness. Stevens specifically objected to Neumann’s use of ontogeny recapitulating phylogeny, his claim that preliterate humans were "unconscious," and his suggestion that Western consciousness evolved under different selection pressures from other civilizations. He argued that these assumptions were biologically untenable.
