= Glittering Images =

2012 book by Camille Paglia

Glittering Images: A Journey Through Art from Egypt to Star Wars
- Cover of the first edition
- Author: Camille Paglia
- Cover artist: Peter Mendelsund
- Language: English
- Subject: Applied and visual arts
- Publisher: Pantheon Books
- Publication date: 2012
- Publication place: United States
- Media type: Print (Hardcover and Paperback)
- Pages: 202
- ISBN: 978-0-375-42460-1

Glittering Images: A Journey Through Art from Egypt to Star Wars is a 2012 book by American cultural critic Camille Paglia, in which the author discusses notable works of applied and visual art from ancient to modern times. Paglia wrote that she intended it to be a personalized "journey" through art history, focusing on Western works. Paglia writes that she felt inspired to write given that she worries 21st century Americans are overexposed to visual stimulation by the "all-pervasive mass media" and must fight to keep their capacity for contemplation.

The book features twenty-nine sections, with glossy full-color illustrations, each focused on a specific piece. Artists detailed include Titian, Manet, Picasso, and Jackson Pollock among others. After its October 16, 2012 release, the book received positive reviews from publications such as The Philadelphia Inquirer and The Wall Street Journal, while it also picked up more critical, negative reviews from publications such as The New York Times Book Review.

== Summary ==
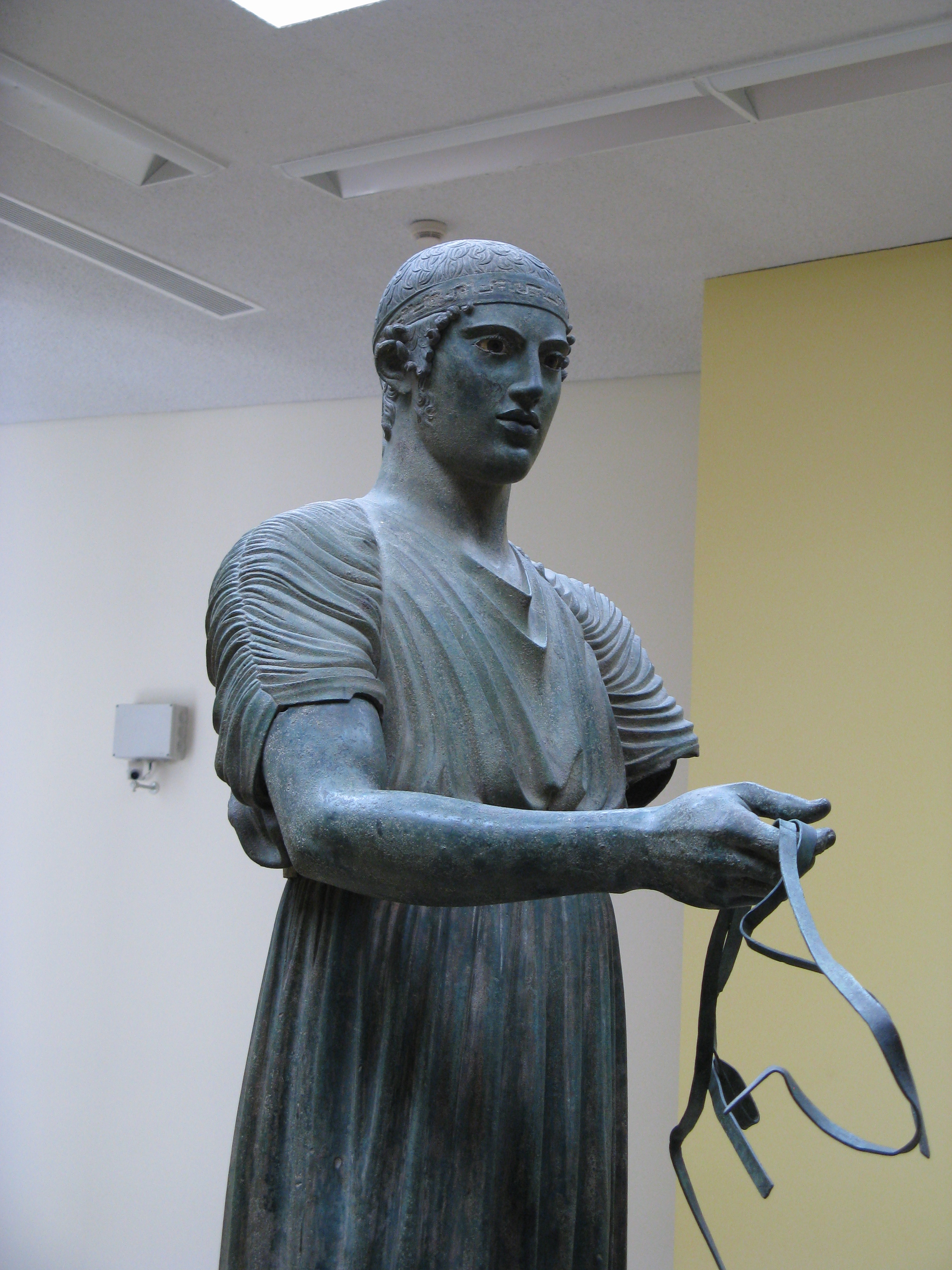
Paglia discusses the Charioteer of Delphi, a notable ancient Greek work.

While touching on the themes of Paglia's previous work, Glittering Images focuses on modern cultural ignorance. Paglia wrote what she intended as a personalized "journey" through art history since she believes people today have become visually overexposed by the mass-media and disconnected from the past. In it, she argues, "the eye is assaulted, coerced, desensitized."

Paglia discusses twenty-nine examples of visual artwork. Paglia begins by describing the ancient Egyptian funerary images of Queen Nefertari, a royal whose name means "the most beautiful of them all". Paglia refers to how the civilization "dreamed of conquering the terrors of death", and she notes how "Egyptian painted figures float in an abstract space that is neither here nor there", describing the visual power of this "eternal present" depicted. She then turns to the Cycladic statuettes carved by Bronze Age residents of several Aegean Sea islands, which feature "coolly geometric" designs unlike that of the voluptuous figures carved by earlier, Stone Age people (such as the 'Venus of Willendorf') while still displaying vulvae markings and prominent breasts that convey femininity. These pieces of Cycladic art are cited as "daring explorations of form and structure" foreshadowing the future.

The author then describes the 'Charioteer of Delphi', a work from the fifth century BC that she writes embodies well the ancient Greek ideals of "young male beauty" and the building of character through personal striving. She states how she finds the chariot racing athlete "grave and dignified" with his meditative expression, giving a "look that would become canonical for gods and heroes in the classic tradition". She goes on to write about the 'Porch of the Maidens' in the Erechtheion in Athens, Greece, with columns carved into feminine shapes that she labels as "a remarkable display of female power" as "muscular strength" co-exists with womanly curves, and then the piece 'Laocoön and His Sons', a violent scene carved in marble in which sea serpents attempt to slay a man and his three sons that stridently addresses the problem of theodicy.

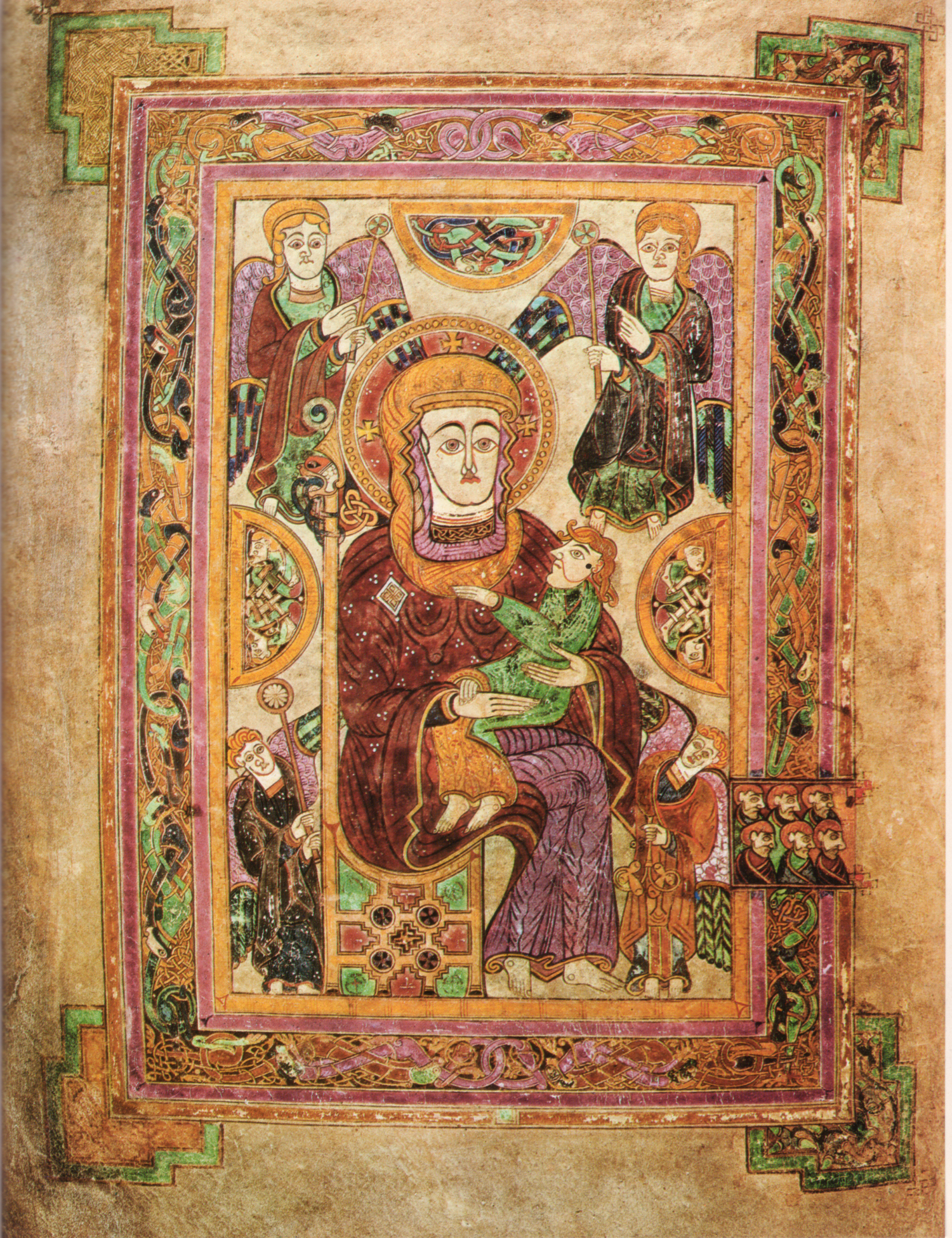
Paglia praises the intricacy of the Book of Kells, the section devoted to Virgin Mary pictured here.

The book goes on next to the famous mosaic of Saint John Chrysostom in the Hagia Sophia, a piece that Paglia writes as having an "implacable intensity of gaze" making it a great piece of Byzantine art, and additionally to the late eighth century Ireland's Book of Kells, an "intricately decorated manuscript of the Gospels that is one of the most beautiful objects surviving from medieval Europe." The eighth piece included is Donatello's 'Mary Magdalene', a work of the Italian Renaissance created in 1453 that showed the artist's ability to be "harsh and imposing". Paglia then discusses Titian's 'Venus with a Mirror'; she writes about the artistic changes it symbolizes as the strong brushwork and liberal use of paint allow for warm flesh tones, Titian creating "opulent nudes that thrust sexual display and fantasy" onto the viewer.

Paglia next discusses Bronzino's 'Portrait of Andrea Doria as Neptune', writing that as a work of the Mannerism movement it shows a "polished theatricality" arresting to the viewer, and Gian Lorenzo Bernini's 'Chair of Saint Peter' in the Vatican City, a 17th-century work showing how Baroque art often "overwhelms the senses with flamboyant grandeur".

She takes a nuanced view of the lasting influence of pop art, writing that, generally, the artistic movement "projects an innocent child's view of the world." She also argues that works by artists such as Andy Warhol, whom she praises, conveyed powerful subtleties with their pieces. The book details 'Marilyn Diptych', a 1962 silkscreen that replicates a photo of Marilyn Monroe over and over with image variations, and the work is lauded for strongly showing the "multiplicity of meanings" in the actress' life and legacy.

The book additionally cites Eleanor Antin's conceptual art project '100 Boots'. Paglia praises the work, writing that "boots, like their creator, are outsiders, eternal migrants questing for knowledge and experience."

== Reception ==
Composer John Adams in The New York Times Book Review published a critical review of the book, viewing it as being "so agenda driven and so riddled with polemic asides that its potential to persuade is forever being compromised." Adams noted that the book avoided discussions of Giotto, Michelangelo, El Greco, Rembrandt, Vermeer, and van Gogh, which he criticized. He supported how Paglia "encourages us to read more closely and to look more imaginatively" at the world of art history, though concluded that her praise of George Lucas was assessing art "by its reach rather than its depth", and thus Paglia "has journeyed to the wrong continent, and what she has found glittering there is fool's gold."

Journalist Gary Rosen of The Wall Street Journal, however, praised the book's "impressive range" and accessibility for a general audience. He argued that "[f]or the most part, Ms. Paglia chooses well, from works both celebrated and obscure", and he stated that the author "is especially good at the difficult trick of providing context for the newcomer to art history without being tedious for a more experienced reader." In addition, The Philadelphia Inquirer ran a supportive article that labeled the book a "magisterial, poetically composed, and masterly study".

The Los Angeles Times published a supportive review by Michael S. Roth, an author and the president of Wesleyan University. He wrote, "Artists, questing outsiders, are still with us, still finding their way, making their way. Perhaps some of them will be inspired by the glittering images Camille Paglia offers here."

== See also ==
- Art history
- Star Wars: Episode III – Revenge of the Sith
- What is a Masterpiece?
