= Howard Parshley =

American entomologist

Howard Madison Parshley (7 August 1884 in Hallowell, Maine – 19 May 1953) was an American zoologist, a specialist on the Heteroptera who also wrote more broadly on genetics, reproduction, and human sexuality. He was responsible for translating The Second Sex into English.

== Life ==
The son of a Baptist minister, Parshley was educated at Harvard University. From 1911 to 1914, he taught zoology at the University of Maine. In 1917, Parshley became assistant professor of zoology at Smith College, where he would stay until 1952. In 1949, he was asked to translate Simone de Beauvoir's Le Deuxième Sexe. Despite a minor heart attack in 1952, Parshley completed this task; his translation, published in 1953, has subsequently been criticized for inaccuracies and excisions.

== Works ==
- A bibliography of the North American Hemiptera-Heteroptera, 1925
- (ed.) General catalogue of the Hemiptera, 1927
- Science and Good Behavior, 1928
- The Science of Human Reproduction: Biological aspects of Sex, 1933
- Biology, 1940
- (transl.) The Second Sex, 1953
