= Leonardo da Vinci, A Memory of His Childhood =

1910 work by Sigmund Freud

- The German edition
- Author: Sigmund Freud
- Original title: Eine Kindheitserinnerung des Leonardo da Vinci
- Language: German
- Subject: Leonardo da Vinci
- Text: Leonardo da Vinci, A Memory of His Childhood at Wikisource

Leonardo da Vinci and a Memory of His Childhood (German: Eine Kindheitserinnerung des Leonardo da Vinci) is a 1910 essay by Sigmund Freud about Leonardo da Vinci. It consists of a psychoanalytic study of Leonardo's life based on his paintings.

== The vulture fantasy ==
In the Codex Atlanticus Leonardo recounts being attacked as an infant in his crib by a bird. Freud cites the passage as:

It seems that it had been destined before that I should occupy myself so thoroughly with the vulture, for it comes to my mind as a very early memory, when I was still in the cradle, a vulture came down to me, he opened my mouth with his tail and struck me a few times with his tail against my lips.

According to Freud, this was a childhood fantasy based on the memory of sucking his mother's nipple. He backed up his claim with the fact that Egyptian hieroglyphs represent the mother as a vulture, because the Egyptians believed that there are no male vultures and that the females of the species are impregnated by the wind. In most representations the vulture-headed maternal deity was formed by the Egyptians in a phallic manner, her body which was distinguished as feminine by its breasts also bore the penis in a state of erection.

However, the translation "Geier" (vulture), which Maria Herzfeld had used for "nibbio" in 1904 in the first edition of her book Leonardo da Vinci, der Denker, Forscher und Poet, was not exactly the kite Leonardo da Vinci had meant: a small hawk-like bird of prey, common in the Vinci area, which is occasionally a scavenger. This disappointed Freud because, as he confessed to Lou Andreas-Salomé in a letter of 9 February 1919, he regarded the Leonardo essay as "the only beautiful thing I have ever written". The psychologist Erich Neumann, writing in Art and the Creative Unconscious, attempted to repair the theory by incorporating the kite.

Erich Neumann rebutted this essay in the first essay in Art and the Creative Unconscious (1959), Leonardo da Vinci and the Mother Archetype. Neumann disagreed with Freud’s psychoanalytic interpretation of Leonardo’s childhood memory and artistic motivations, which viewed Leonardo’s creativity as the result of repressed sexuality and sublimation. Neumann counter-argued that Leonardo’s themes should be understood through the Jungian framework of archetypes, particularly the Great Mother, and the Great Individual archetypes. Neumann further argued that art serves as a bridge between the conscious and unconscious mind, playing a crucial role in the development of individual and collective consciousness. The book analyzes the creative process in mythological and artistic traditions, viewing it as a key mechanism for psychological integration.

== Interpretation of The Virgin and Child with Saint Anne ==
Another theory proposed by Freud attempts to explain Leonardo's fondness of depicting the Virgin Mary with Saint Anne in the picture The Virgin and Child with Saint Anne. Leonardo, who was illegitimate, was raised by his blood mother initially before being "adopted" by the wife of his father Ser Piero. The idea of depicting the Mother of God with her own mother was therefore particularly close to Leonardo's heart, because he, in a sense, had 'two mothers' himself. In both versions of the composition (the Louvre painting and the London cartoon) it is hard to discern whether Saint Anne is a full generation older than Mary. Freud also points out that, in the painting, the outline of a vulture can be seen. This is connected to the original fantasy involving the vulture in Leonardo da Vinci's crib.

== See also ==
- Psychobiography
