= What is a Masterpiece? =

1979 book by Kenneth Clark

- Author: Kenneth Clark
- Language: English
- Subject: Visual arts
- Published: 1979
- Publication place: United Kingdom
- Media type: Print

What is a Masterpiece? is a 1979 non-fiction book by British historian Kenneth Clark. It is a transcribed version of the Walter Neurath memorial lectures given by Clark. The work, initially released on 1 January 1979, received a Thames & Hudson republication on 1 May 1992.

== Background ==
Kenneth Clark had already achieved fame with a series of popular books while also serving as, from 1969 on, the writer, producer and presenter of the BBC programme, Civilisation, a pioneering television documentary series. The prestigious series earned a Peabody Award as well as general commercial success. In the work, he articulated his viewpoint that cultural, political, and scientific progress can be shown from society to society in the Western world as time passes through pieces of visual art.

== Contents ==
Clark's work on masterpieces emphatically supports the concept that there is such a thing as a masterpiece and that in some sense it may be objectively defined or comprehended. He opposes this to a certain form of cultural relativism that had become prominent in recent decades and may in part be attributed to the influence of postmodernism. In particular, the notion of a masterpiece was related to the balance between the particular (the fruits of the era in which the artist lived) with the universal (the grand themes raised by the human condition itself) in Clark's view.

Clark's definition of an artistic masterpiece was based on a number of different considerations and criteria that apply to different works produced in markedly different time periods and milieux. For example, in this particular work he argued that it is the "creation of an individual artist's authentic genius." At the same time, he expounded a number of other aspects that for him were essential in the configuration of a masterpiece: that it is "a confluence of memories and emotions forming a single idea", that it has "a power of recreating traditional forms so that they become expressive of an artist's own epoch and yet keep a relationship to the past". The highest masterpieces are said to be "illustrations of great themes." Clark also implicitly excluded the erotic from considerations of what constituted a masterpiece, based on his perspective that a necessary condition is the balance between sense and form (works that are too sensual are, therefore, unbalanced and not to be categorised at masterpiece level).

== See also ==
- 1979 in literature
- Art history
- Glittering Images
