= Vamps and Tramps: New Essays =

1994 collection of 42 essays

- Author: Camille Paglia
- Language: English
- Subject: Culture
- Genre: Essays
- Published: 1994
- Publisher: Vintage Books
- Publication place: United States
- Media type: Print
- Pages: 532

Vamps and Tramps: New Essays is a collection of 42 essays by Camilie Paglia published in 1994. It was featured on The New York Times Best Seller list.

The book also contains a collection of newspaper cartoons about Paglia, and an index of media appearances by her.

== Critical reception ==
The New York Times, ""Vamps & Tramps" is seldom perplexed. It is a compendium of Ms. Paglia's thoughts and media triumphs since her meteoric rise from professor to celebrity."

Reason magazine, "A book by Paglia is a lot like sex itself: When it's good, it's very, very good. And when it's bad, it's still pretty good. Vamps & Tramps is a step above pretty good."

Kirkus Reviews, "Those who missed them in Playboy, The New Republic, and other media can catch up with culture diva Paglia's latest performances here. The special effects are as spectacular as ever; the act, however, is getting old."
