= Camille Paglia =

American feminist academic and critic (born 1947)

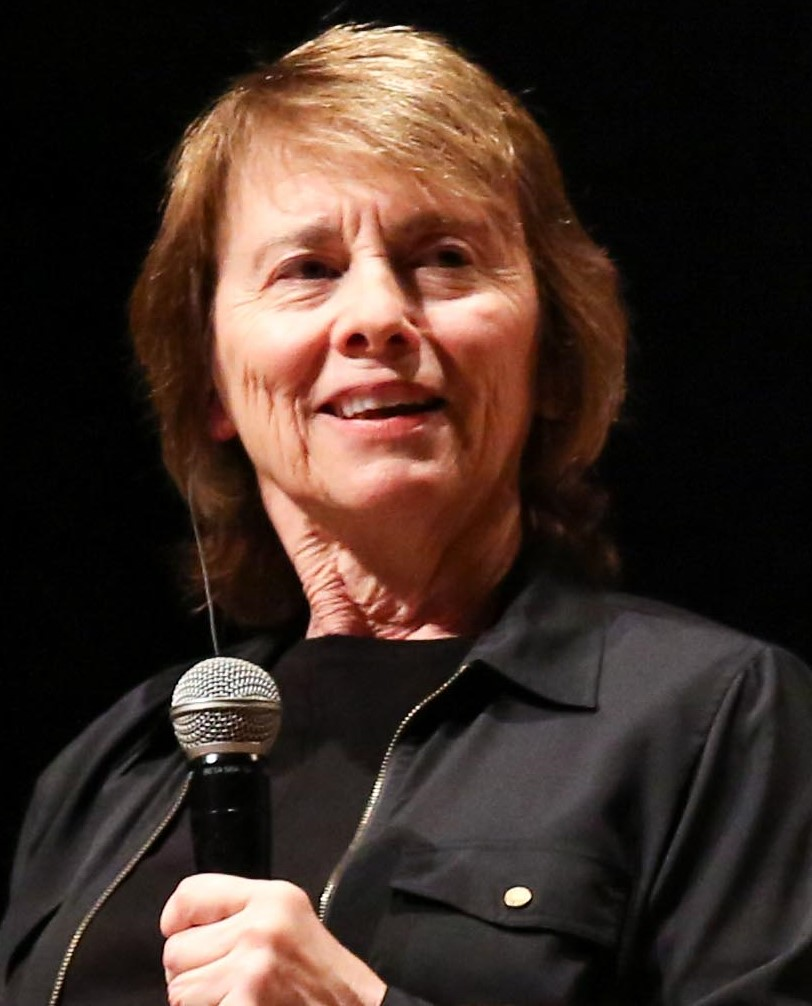
- Paglia in 2017
- Born: Camille Anna Paglia; April 2, 1947 (age 79); Endicott, New York, U.S.
- Education: Binghamton University (BA); Yale University (MPhil, PhD)
- Occupations: Professor, cultural critic
- Writing career
- Subjects: Popular culture, art, poetry, sex, film, feminism, politics
- Movement: Individualist feminism

Camille Anna Paglia (/ˈpɑːliə/ PAH-lee-ə; born April 2, 1947) is an American academic, social critic, and feminist. Paglia was a professor at the University of the Arts in Philadelphia, Pennsylvania, from 1984 until the university's closure in 2024. She is critical of many aspects of modern culture and is the author of Sexual Personae: Art and Decadence from Nefertiti to Emily Dickinson (1990) and other books. She is also a critic of contemporary American feminism and of post-structuralism, as well as a commentator on multiple aspects of American culture such as its visual art, music, and film history.

== Early life ==
Paglia was born in Endicott, New York, the eldest child of Lydia Anne (née Colapietro) and Pasquale Paglia. All four of her grandparents were born in Italy. Her mother emigrated to the United States at five years old from Ceccano, in the province of Frosinone, Lazio. Her father's side of the family was from the Campanian towns of Avellino, Benevento, and Caserta. Paglia was raised Catholic, and attended primary school in rural Oxford, New York, where her family lived in a working farmhouse.

Her father, a veteran of World War II, taught at the Oxford Academy high school and exposed his young daughter to art through books he brought home about French art history. In 1957, her family moved to Syracuse, New York, so that her father could begin graduate school; he eventually became a professor of Romance languages at Le Moyne College. She attended the Edward Smith Elementary School, T. Aaron Levy Junior High, and Nottingham Senior High School.

In 1992, Carmelia Metosh, her Latin teacher for three years, said, "She always has been controversial. Whatever statements were being made (in class), she had to challenge them. She made good points then, as she does now." Paglia thanked Metosh in the acknowledgments to Sexual Personae, later describing her as "the dragon lady of Latin studies, who breathed fire at principals and school boards".

During her stays at a summer Girl Scout camp in Thendara, New York, she took on new names, including Anastasia (her confirmation name, inspired by the film Anastasia), Stacy, and Stanley. A crucially significant event for her was when an outhouse exploded after she poured too much quicklime into the latrine. "That symbolized everything I would do with my life and work. Excess and extravagance and explosiveness. I would be someone who would look into the latrine of culture, into pornography and crime and psychopathology... and I would drop the bomb into it".

== Education ==
In 1964, Paglia entered Harpur College at Binghamton University. The same year, Paglia's poem "Atrophy" was published in the local newspaper. She later said that she was trained to read literature by poet Milton Kessler, who "believed in the responsiveness of the body, and of the activation of the senses to literature ... And oh did I believe in that". According to Paglia, while in college she punched a "marauding drunk", and takes pride in having been put on probation for committing 39 pranks. In 1968, Paglia received her B.A. degree in English from Binghamton University in 1968, graduating from Harpur as class valedictorian.

Paglia then attended Yale Graduate School where she obtained an M.Phil. degree in 1971. She claims to have been the only open lesbian at Yale from 1968 to 1972. At Yale, Paglia quarreled with Rita Mae Brown, whom she later characterized as "then darkly nihilist," and argued with the New Haven, Connecticut, Women's Liberation Rock Band when they dismissed The Rolling Stones as sexist. Paglia was mentored by Harold Bloom. Sexual Personae was then titled "The Androgynous Dream: the image of the androgyne as it appears in literature and is embodied in the psyche of the artist, with reference to the visual arts and the cinema."

In 1973, Paglia drove to an appearance by Susan Sontag at Dartmouth, hoping to arrange for her to speak at Bennington, but found it difficult to find the money for Sontag's speaking fee. Paglia staged a poster campaign urging students to attend Sontag's appearance. Sontag arrived at Bennington Carriage Barn, where she was to speak, more than an hour late, and then began reading what Paglia recalled as a "boring and bleak" short story about "nothing" in the style of a French New Novel.

Through her further study of the classics and the scholarly work of Jane Ellen Harrison, James George Frazer, Erich Neumann and others, Paglia developed a theory of sexual history that diverged sharply from several ideas then fashionable at the time, leading to her criticism of Marija Gimbutas, Carolyn Heilbrun, Kate Millett and others. She laid out her ideas on matriarchy, androgyny, homosexuality, sadomasochism and other topics in her doctoral dissertation Sexual Personae: The Androgyne in Literature and Art, which she defended in 1974 to earn her Ph.D. from Yale University.

== Career ==
In the autumn of 1972, Paglia began teaching at Bennington College, which hired her in part thanks to a recommendation from Harold Bloom. At Bennington, she befriended the philosopher James Fessenden, who first taught there in the same semester.

In September 1976, she gave a public lecture drawing on her dissertation, discussing Edmund Spenser's The Faerie Queene, followed by remarks on Diana Ross, Gracie Allen, Yul Brynner, and Stéphane Audran.

Paglia wrote that she "nearly came to blows with the founding members of the women's studies program at the State University of New York at Albany, when they categorically denied that hormones influence human experience or behavior". Similar fights with feminists and academics culminated in a 1978 incident which led her to resign from Bennington; after a lengthy standoff with the administration, Paglia accepted a settlement from the college and resigned in 1979.

Paglia finished her book Sexual Personae in the early 1980s, but could not get it published. In 2026, Sexual Personae was reissued for the 36th anniversary of its original publication. She supported herself with visiting and part-time teaching jobs at Yale, Wesleyan, and other Connecticut colleges. Her paper, "The Apollonian Androgyne and the Faerie Queene", was published in English Literary Renaissance, Winter 1979. In April 1980, her dissertation was cited by J. Hillis Miller in his article "Wuthering Heights and the Ellipses of Interpretation", in Journal of Religion in Literature, but her academic career was otherwise stalled. In a 1995 letter to Boyd Holmes, she recalled: "I earned a little extra money by doing some local features reporting for a New Haven alternative newspaper (The Advocate) in the early 1980s". She wrote articles on New Haven's historic pizzerias and on an old house that was a stop on the Underground Railroad.

In 1984, she joined the faculty of the Philadelphia College of Performing Arts, which merged in 1987 with the Philadelphia College of Art, to become the University of the Arts. She retired right before the school's closure in 2024.

Paglia made cameo appearances as herself in the films It's Pat (1994), The Watermelon Woman (1996), and Henry Fool (1997).

Paglia is on the editorial board of the classics and humanities journal Arion. She wrote a regular column for Salon.com from 1995 to 2001, and again from 2007 to 2009. During 2016, Paglia briefly resumed writing a Salon column.

Paglia cooperated with Carl Rollyson and Lisa Paddock in their writing of Susan Sontag: The Making of an Icon. Rollyson and Paddock note that Sontag "had her lawyer put our publisher on notice" when she realized she was to be the subject.

Paglia participates in the decennial poll of film professionals conducted by Sight and Sound which asks participants to submit a list of what they believe to be the ten greatest films of all time. According to her responses to the poll in 2002, 2012, and 2022, the films Paglia holds in highest regard include Ben-Hur, Blowup, Citizen Kane, La Dolce Vita, The Godfather, The Godfather: Part II, Gone with the Wind, Lawrence of Arabia, North by Northwest, Orphée, Persona, 2001: A Space Odyssey, The Ten Commandments, and Vertigo. During 2012's Chicago Humanities Festival, Paglia praised Star Wars: Episode III – Revenge of the Sith as the greatest work of art in the past 30 years, praising the movie's visual effects and symbology, specially in its final act with it being "emotionally compelling and significant".

In 2005, Paglia was named as one of the top 100 public intellectuals by the journals Foreign Policy and Prospect. In 2012, an article in The New York Times remarked that "anyone who has been following the body count of the culture wars over the past decades knows Paglia". Paglia has said that she is willing to have her entire career judged on the basis of her composition of what she considers to be "probably the most important sentence that she has ever written": "God is man's greatest idea."

Paglia will release a new book, Pop Studies, on July 27, 2027.

== Views ==
=== Feminism ===
Though Paglia admires Simone de Beauvoir and The Second Sex ("the supreme work of modern feminism... its deep learning and massive argument are unsurpassed") as well as Germaine Greer, Time critic Martha Duffy writes that Paglia "does not hesitate to hurl brazen insults" at several feminists. In an interview, Paglia stated that to be effective, one has to "name names"; criticism should be concrete. Paglia stated that many critics "escape into abstractions", rendering their criticism "intellectualized and tame". Paglia was known as one of the scholars and feminists that theorized American singer Madonna within feminism, for which publications such as Vogue called her the "high priestess of post-feminism".

Paglia has accused Greer of becoming "a drone in three years" due to being overly satisfied with her early success; she also criticized the work of feminist activist Diana Fuss as "junk". Elaine Showalter called Paglia "unique in the hyperbole and virulence of her hostility to virtually all the prominent feminist activists, public figures, writers and scholars of her generation", mentioning Carolyn Heilbrun, Judith Butler, Carol Gilligan, Marilyn French, Zoe Baird, Kimba Wood, Susan Thomases, and Hillary Clinton as targets of her criticism.

Paglia accused Kate Millett of starting "the repressive, Stalinist style in feminist criticism." Paglia has also repeatedly criticized Patricia Ireland, former president of the National Organization for Women (NOW), calling her a "sanctimonious", unappealing role model for women, whose "smug, arrogant" attitude is accompanied by "painfully limited processes of thought". Paglia contends that under Ireland's leadership, NOW had "damaged and marginalized the women's movement".

In 1999, Martha Nussbaum wrote an essay called "The Professor of Parody", in which she criticized Judith Butler for retreating to abstract theory disconnected from real world problems. Paglia reacted to the essay by stating that the criticism was "long overdue", but also characterized the essay as "one PC diva turning against another". She criticized Nussbaum for failing to make her criticisms earlier while accusing her of borrowing Paglia's ideas without acknowledgement. She called Nussbaum's "preparation or instinct for sex analysis... dubious at best", but nevertheless stated that "Nussbaum is a genuine scholar who operates on a vastly higher intellectual level than Butler".

Many feminists have criticized Paglia; Christina Hoff Sommers calls her "[p]erhaps the most conspicuous target of feminist opprobrium," noting that the Women's Review of Books described Sexual Personae as patriarchy's "counter-assault on feminism". Some feminist critics have characterized Paglia as an "anti-feminist feminist", critical of central features of much contemporary feminism but holding out "her own special variety of feminist affirmation".

In the early 1990s, Naomi Wolf traded a series of sometimes personal attacks with Paglia. In The New Republic, Wolf wrote that Paglia "poses as a sexual renegade but is in fact the most dutiful of patriarchal daughters" and characterized Paglia as intellectually dishonest. In a 1991 speech, Paglia criticized Wolf for blaming anorexia on the media, calling Wolf a "twit". Gloria Steinem said of Paglia that, "Her calling herself a feminist is sort of like a Nazi saying they're not anti-Semitic." Paglia called Steinem "the Stalin of feminism". Katha Pollitt calls Paglia one of a "seemingly endless parade of social critics [who] have achieved celebrity by portraying not sexism but feminism as the problem". Pollitt writes that Paglia has glorified "male dominance", and has been able to get away with things "that might make even Rush Limbaugh blanch," because she is a woman.

Paglia's view that rape is sexually motivated has been endorsed by evolutionary psychologists Randy Thornhill and Craig T. Palmer; in their book A Natural History Of Rape (2000) they comment that "Paglia [...] urges women to be skeptical toward the feminist 'party line' on the subject, to become better informed about risk factors, and to use the information to lower their risk of rape".

In an essay critiquing the Hollywood/celebrity fad of "Girl Squads", made popular in 2015 by pop-icons like Taylor Swift, Paglia argued that rather than empowering women, the cliquish practice actually harms the self-esteem of those who are not rich, famous, or attractive enough to belong to the group, while further defining women only by a very narrow, often sexualized stereotype. She challenged that to be truly empowering, these groups need to mentor, advise, and be more inclusive, for more women to realize their true, individual potential.

=== Transgender people ===
Paglia has said that she identifies as transgender, and reports having gender dysphoria since childhood, saying "never once in my life have I felt female". She says that she was "donning flamboyant male costumes from early childhood on".

Although she describes herself as transgender, Paglia says she is "highly skeptical about the current transgender wave" which she thinks has been produced by "far more complicated psychological and sociological factors than current gender discourse allows". She said that the "cold biological truth is that sex changes are impossible" and that she "reject[s] state-sponsored coercion to call someone a 'woman' or a 'man' simply on the basis of his or her subjective feeling about it." She writes that "In a democracy, everyone, no matter how nonconformist or eccentric, should be free from harassment and abuse. But at the same time, no one deserves special rights, protections, or privileges on the basis of their eccentricity." She has also described the practice of prescribing puberty blockers to children as "a crime against humanity".

In 2019, in response to her views about transgender people and her comments about survivors of sexual assault, students at the University of the Arts protested her lectures and organized a petition to remove her from the school's faculty, but this was ultimately rejected by the university. Paglia considered the student demonstrations "a publicity stunt" and praised the university's "eloquent statement affirming academic freedom [as] a landmark in contemporary education."

=== Climate change ===
Paglia has long rejected the scientific consensus on global warming, which she describes as "the political agenda that has slowly accrued" around the issue of climate change. In a 2017 interview with The Weekly Standard, Paglia stated, "It is certainly ironic how liberals who posture as defenders of science when it comes to global warming (a sentimental myth unsupported by evidence) flee all reference to biology when it comes to gender." In an interview with Tyler Cowen on his podcast Conversations with Tyler Paglia expresses the view that nature is much more powerful than theories of climate change recognize. She states "to imagine we can make a change in it [the climate] is so absolutely absurd".

=== French academia ===
Paglia is critical of the influence many postwar French writers have had on the humanities, claiming that universities are in the "thrall" of French post-structuralists; that in the works of Jean Baudrillard, Jacques Derrida, Jacques Lacan and Michel Foucault, she never once found a sentence that interested her.

However, Paglia's assessment of French writers is not purely negative. She has called Simone de Beauvoir's The Second Sex (1949) "brilliant and imperious" and she traces the lineage of her "dissident feminism" not from Betty Friedan but from Beauvoir. Paglia also identified Jean-Paul Sartre's work as part of a high period in literature. She has praised Roland Barthes's Mythologies (1957) and Gilles Deleuze's Masochism: Coldness and Cruelty (1967), while finding both men's later work flawed. Of Gaston Bachelard, who influenced Paglia, she wrote "[his] dignified yet fluid phenomenological descriptive method seemed to me ideal for art", adding that he was "the last modern French writer I took seriously".

=== Politics ===
Paglia characterizes herself as a libertarian. She opposes laws against prostitution, pornography, drugs, and abortion. She is also opposed to affirmative action laws. Some of her views have been characterized as conservative, although when asked in 2016 if she considers herself a cultural conservative she replied: "No, not at all... Conservative would mean I was cleaving to something past which was great, and no longer is... and Usually I'm not saying we should return to anything. I do believe we're moving inexorably into the future."

Paglia criticized Bill Clinton for not resigning after the Monica Lewinsky scandal, which she says "paralyzed the government for two years, leading directly to our blindsiding by 9/11." In the 2000 U.S. presidential campaign, she voted for the Green Party candidate Ralph Nader because "I detest the arrogant, corrupt superstructure of the Democratic Party, with which I remain stubbornly registered."

In the 2004 U.S. presidential election, Paglia supported John Kerry, and in 2008 she supported Barack Obama. In 2012, she supported Green Party candidate Jill Stein. Paglia was highly critical of 2016 presidential candidate Hillary Clinton, calling her a "fraud" and a "liar". Paglia refused to support either Hillary Clinton or Donald Trump in the 2016 U.S. presidential election, indicating in a March Salon column that if Hillary Clinton won the Democratic Party's nomination, she would either cast a write-in vote for Bernie Sanders or else vote for Green Party candidate Stein, as she did in 2012. Paglia later clarified in a statement that she would vote for Stein.

In 2017, she stated that she is a registered Democrat who voted for Bernie Sanders in the 2016 Democratic primary and for Jill Stein in the 2016 general election. For the 2020 U.S. presidential election, Paglia criticized the Democratic Party for lacking a coherent message and a strong candidate. She disavowed Sanders as being "way too old and creaky" and retracted her initial support for Kamala Harris for missing "a huge opportunity to play a moderating, statesmanlike role". Citing the "need to project steadiness, substance, and warmth," Paglia expressed interest in Cheri Bustos and Steve Bullock as potential candidates.

=== Child sexuality ===
Paglia jokingly commented in an interview in 1992: "In the case of Sinéad O'Connor, child abuse was justified". This was her response to the singer's action on Saturday Night Live, where she tore up a picture of the pope in protest of the unfolding child sexual abuse scandal surrounding the Catholic Church. In 1993, Paglia signed a manifesto supporting NAMBLA, a pederasty and pedophilia advocacy organization. In 1994, Paglia supported lowering the legal age of consent to 14. She noted in a 1995 interview with pro-pedophile activist Bill Andriette, "I fail to see what is wrong with erotic fondling with any age."

In a 1997 Salon column, Paglia expressed the view that male pedophilia correlates with the heights of a civilization, stating "I have repeatedly protested the lynch-mob hysteria that dogs the issue of man-boy love. In Sexual Personae, I argued that male pedophilia is intricately intertwined with the cardinal moments of Western civilization." Paglia noted in several interviews, as well as Sexual Personae, that she supported the legalization of certain forms of child pornography.

She later changed her views on the matter. In an interview for Radio New Zealand's Saturday Morning show, conducted on April 28, 2018, by Kim Hill, Paglia was asked, "Are you a libertarian on the issue of pedophilia?", to which she replied, "In terms of the present day, I think it's absolutely impossible to think we could reproduce the Athenian code of pedophilia, of boy-love, that was central to culture at that time. [...] We must protect children, and I feel that very very strongly. The age of consent for sexual interactions between a boy and an older man is obviously disputed, at what point that should be. I used to think that fourteen (the way it is in some places in the world) was adequate. I no longer think that. I think young people need greater protection than that. [...] This is one of those areas that we must confine to the realm of imagination and the history of the arts."

== Books ==
=== Sexual Personae (1990) ===
Paglia's Sexual Personae was rejected by at least seven publishers before it was published by Yale University Press, where it became a best-seller. 'Paglia called it her "prison book", commenting, "I felt like Cervantes, Genet. It took all the resources of being Catholic to cut myself off and sit in my cell." Sexual Personae has been called an "energetic, Freud-friendly reading of Western art", one that seemed "heretical and perverse", at the height of political correctness; according to Daniel Nester, its characterization of "William Blake as the British Marquis de Sade or Walt Whitman and Emily Dickinson as 'self-ruling hermaphrodites who cannot mate' still pricks up many an English major's ears."

In the book, Paglia argues that human nature has an inherently dangerous Dionysian or chthonic aspect, especially in regard to sexuality. Culture and civilization are created by men and represent an attempt to contain that force. Women are powerful, too, but as natural forces, and both marriage and religion are means to contain chaotic forces. A best seller, it was described by Terry Teachout in a New York Times book review as being both "intellectually stimulating" and "exasperating." Sexual Personae received critical reviews from numerous feminist scholars. Anthony Burgess described Sexual Personae as "a fine disturbing book" that "seeks to attack the reader's emotions as well as his or her prejudices". It was also notably on David Bowie's list of favorite books.

=== Sex, Art and American Culture (1992) ===
External videos
- Presentation by Paglia on Sex, Art and American Culture, October 26, 1994, C-SPAN

Sex, Art and American Culture: Essays is a collection of short pieces, many published previously as editorials or reviews, and some transcripts of interviews. The essays cover such subjects as Madonna, Elizabeth Taylor, rock music, Robert Mapplethorpe, the Clarence Thomas Supreme Court nomination, rape, bodybuilding, Marlon Brando, drag, Milton Kessler, and academia. It made The New York Times Best Seller list for paperbacks.

=== Vamps and Tramps (1994) ===
Vamps and Tramps: New Essays is a collection of 42 short articles and a long essay, "No Law in the Arena: a Pagan Theory of Sexuality". It also contains a collection of cartoons from newspapers about Paglia. Writing for The New York Times, Wendy Steiner wrote "Comic, camp, outspoken, Ms. Paglia throws an absurdist shoe into the ponderous wheels of academia". Michiko Kakutani, also writing for The New York Times, wrote: "Her writings on education ... are highly persuasive, just as some of her essays on the perils of regulating pornography and the puritanical excesses of the women's movement radiate a fierce common sense ... Unfortunately, Ms. Paglia has a way of undermining her more interesting arguments with flip, hyperbolic declarations".

=== The Birds ===
In 1998, in commemoration of the 35th anniversary of the release of Alfred Hitchcock's film The Birds, the British Film Institute commissioned Paglia to write a book about the film. The book interprets the film as "in the main line of British Romanticism descending from the raw nature-tableaux and sinister femme-fatales of Coleridge". Her studies consider the film's "aesthetic, technical and mythical qualities, and analyses its depiction of gender and family relations". Paglia uses a psychoanalytic framework to interpret the film as portraying "a release of primitive forces of sex and appetite that have been subdued but never fully tamed".

=== Break, Blow, Burn (2005) ===
Break, Blow, Burn: Camille Paglia Reads Forty-three of the World's Best Poems is a collection of 43 short selections of verse with an accompanying essay by Paglia. The collection is oriented primarily to those unfamiliar with the works. Clive James wrote that Paglia tends to focus on American works as it moves from Shakespeare forward through time, with Yeats, following Coleridge, as the last European discussed, but emphasized her range of sympathy and her ability to juxtapose and unite distinct art forms in her analysis.

=== Glittering Images (2012) ===
Glittering Images: A Journey Through Art from Egypt to Star Wars is a series of essays about notable works of art from ancient to modern times, published in October 2012. Composer John Adams, writing for The New York Times Book Review was skeptical of the book, accusing it of being "so agenda driven and so riddled with polemic asides that its potential to persuade is forever being compromised". Gary Rosen of The Wall Street Journal, however, praised the book's "impressive range" and accessibility to readers.

=== Free Women, Free Men (2017) ===
External videos
- Presentation by Paglia on Free Women, Free Men, March 20, 2017, C-SPAN

Free Women, Free Men: Sex, Gender, and Feminism is a series of essays from 1990 onward. Dwight Garner in The New York Times wrote Paglia's essays address two main targets: modern feminism, which, Paglia writes, "has become a catchall vegetable drawer where bunches of clingy sob sisters can store their moldy neuroses," and modern American universities, of which she asks, "How is it possible that today's academic left has supported rather than protested campus speech codes as well as the grotesque surveillance and overregulation of student life?"

=== Provocations (2018) ===
Paglia's fourth essay collection, Provocations: Collected Essays on Art, Feminism, Politics, Sex, and Education, was published by Pantheon on October 9, 2018.

== Personal life ==
For more than a decade, Paglia was the partner of artist Alison Maddex. Paglia legally adopted Maddex's son, who was born in 2002. In 2007, the couple separated but remained "harmonious co-parents", in the words of Paglia, who lived two miles (three kilometers) apart.

Paglia is an atheist, and has stated she has "a very spiritual mystic view of the universe". She has expressed interest in astrology and has written about it in several of her works, including Sexual Personae: "I'm an astrologer – people don't mention this! I mean, everyone's attacked me for everything else. I mean, I'm an astrologer – it's right in my book. I endorse astrology. I believe in astrology. Will someone attack me for that? No!" Despite her atheism in her adulthood, Paglia was Catholic until a run-in with the nuns at her school in her teen years, during which she challenged them about why God could not forgive Satan and subsequently left the faith.

== Works ==
- The Androgyne in Literature and Art (1974; PhD thesis)
- Sexual Personae: Art and Decadence from Nefertiti to Emily Dickinson (1990) ISBN 0-679-73579-8
- Sex, Art and American Culture: Essays (1992) ISBN 0-679-74101-1
- Glennda and Camille Do Downtown (1993), documentary film
- Vamps and Tramps: New Essays (1994) ISBN 0-679-75120-3
- The Birds (BFI Film Classics) (1998) ISBN 0-851-70651-7
- Break, Blow, Burn: Camille Paglia Reads Forty-three of the World's Best Poems (2005) ISBN 0-375-42084-3
- Glittering Images: A Journey Through Art from Egypt to Star Wars (2012) ISBN 978-0-375-42460-1
- Free Women, Free Men: Sex, Gender, and Feminism (2017) ISBN 978-0-375424779
- Provocations: Collected Essays (2018) ISBN 978-1-52474689-6
