= Siegmund Hurwitz =

Siegmund Hurwitz (died 1994) was a Swiss psychoanalyst, Jungian scholar and writer on Jewish mysticism.

Hurwitz was a member of the innermost circle of Carl Jung’s so-called Zurich school and he received his analytical training from Jung, Toni Wolff and Marie-Louise von Franz. Hurwitz was Jung’s dentist for many years and was, together with his wife Leni Hurwitz (one of the original editors of Jung’s Collected Works), also a personal friend. He often advised Jung on questions regarding Jewish mysticism and they shared wide-ranging interests in the fields of philosophy and religion. Hurwitz worked both as a dentist and an analyst for many years, and after his retirement from dentistry, he was able to devote more time to his writing. He was long a scholar of Jewish mysticism and, with his gift for language, was often sought out by Jung and others when there were ancient texts to be consulted.

He continued to maintain a small analytical practice in Zurich until his death in the Summer of 1994.

== Works ==
Hurwitz published numerous articles and books over the course of his long lifetime, contributing to the third volume of Studien aus dem G. G. Jung-Institut and later authoring the eighth volume of the series, Die Gestalt des sterbenden Messiahs on his own.

- Archetypische Motive in der Chassidischen Mystik ("Archetypal motifs in Hassidic Mysticism") ("Studies from the C.G. Jung Institute" Rascher, 1952)
- Die Gestalt des sterbenden Messiahs ("The figure of the dying Messiah") in Zeitlose Dokumente der Seele, Studien aus dem CG Jung-Institut, VIII, Rascher, 1958),

Translations: Timeless documents of the soul, Studies in Jungian thought ed. Helmuth Jacobsohn, Marie-Luise von Franz, Siegmund Hurwitz, Staatliche Museen zu Berlin Northwestern University Press, 1968

- Lilith: Die Erste Eva: Eine Studie uber dunkle Aspekte des Weiblichen, Zurich: Daimon Verlag, 1980 English translation Lilith – The First Eve translated Gela Jacobson.
- The dark face of God in Judaism - essay in Jung and the monotheisms: Judaism, Christianity, and Islam - p 45 ed. Joel Ryce-Menuhin - 1994
