= Erich Neumann (psychologist) =

German writer, psychologist and philosopher (1905–1960)

- אריך נוימן
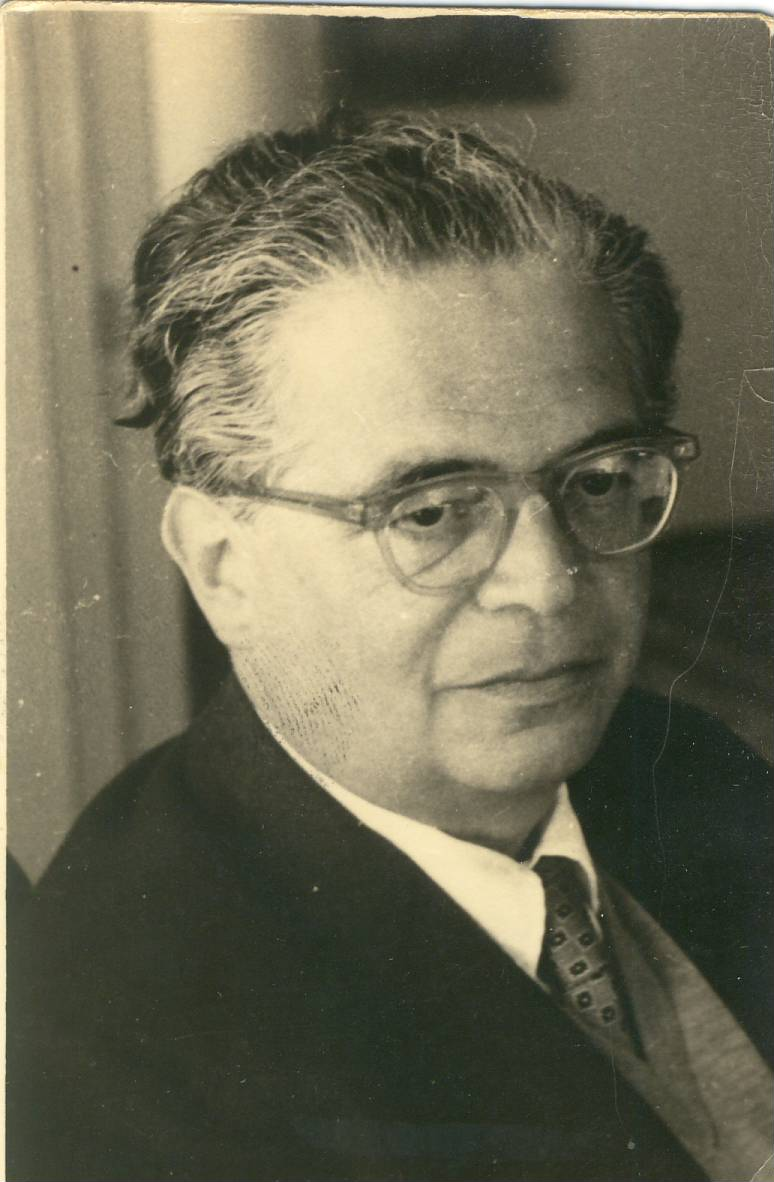
- Born: 23 January 1905; Berlin, German Empire
- Died: 5 November 1960 (aged 55); Tel Aviv, Israel
- Education: University of Erlangen (PhD); University of Berlin (MD)
- Known for: Analytical psychology
- Scientific career
- Fields: Psychology

Erich Neumann (Hebrew: אריך נוימן; 23 January 1905 – 5 November 1960) was a German analytical psychologist and student of Carl Jung.

== Life and career ==
Neumann was born in Berlin to a Jewish family. He received his PhD in philosophy from the University of Erlangen in 1927. Then, he continued to study medicine at the University of Berlin, where he acquired his first degree in medicine in 1933.

In 1934 Neumann and his wife Julie, who were both Zionists, moved to Tel Aviv to avoid being persecuted by the Nazi Government. For many years, he regularly returned to Zürich, Switzerland to give lectures at the annual Eranos conference at the C. G. Jung Institute. He also lectured frequently in England, France and the Netherlands, and was a member of the International Association for Analytical Psychology and president of the Israel Association of Analytical Psychologists. He practiced analytical psychology in Tel Aviv from 1934 until his death from kidney cancer in 1960.

== Career ==
Erich Neumann was a Jungian psychologist whose work focused on the evolution of consciousness, depth psychology, and archetypal symbolism. Best known for developing the ego-self axis theory, an extension of Carl Jung's theory of individuation, he further expanded Carl Jung's theories, particularly in the areas of the psychological history of humanity and consciousness, mythology, creativity, and the integration of the unconscious.

As defined in his 1952 Eranos lecture, "The Psyche and the Transformation of the Reality Planes," the ego-self axis is a concept in analytical psychology that describes the developmental relationship between the ego, the center of conscious identity, and the Self, the totality of the psyche and the source of individuation. Neumann expanded this idea into a model of psychological growth, emphasizing how the ego emerges from the unconscious and evolves toward greater integration with the Self.

One of Neumann's most significant contributions was his theory of the development of consciousness, outlined in The Origins and History of Consciousness (1949). In this work, Neumann proposed a developmental model of human consciousness based on mythological and psychological stages, tracing the emergence of the ego from the collective unconscious through symbolic narratives. His approach was deeply influenced by Jung's concept of archetypes, but he extended it by emphasizing the cultural evolution of the psyche. Carl Jung wrote the introduction, describing it as a continuation and expansion of his own work.

Neumann also made notable contributions to the study of archetypal feminine symbolism in The Great Mother (1955), Amor and Psyche (1956), and other related works, where he examined universal representations of the feminine principle in mythology, religion, and psychology.

In Depth Psychology and a New Ethic (1949), Neumann explored the role of the shadow in individual and collective psychology, arguing that Western culture's repression of the shadow leads to projection, scapegoating, and social unrest. He proposed a "new ethic", in which individuals take responsibility for and integrate their unconscious drives rather than externalizing them onto others. His work in this area has been recognized as an early psychological critique of authoritarianism and mass psychology, particularly in relation to post-WWII Europe.

Neumann also wrote extensively about creativity and the role of artistic expression in psychological transformation. In Art and the Creative Unconscious (1959), Neumann argued that art serves as a bridge between the conscious and unconscious mind, playing a crucial role in the development of individual and collective consciousness. The book analyzes the creative process in mythological and artistic traditions, viewing it as a key mechanism for psychological integration. In the first essay, Leonardo da Vinci and the Mother Archetype, Neumann explicitly refutes Freud's psychoanalytic interpretation of Leonardo's childhood memory and artistic motivations, Leonardo da Vinci, A Memory of His Childhood. Freud viewed Leonardo's creativity as the result of repressed sexuality and sublimation. Instead, Neumann argued that Leonardo's themes should be understood through the Jungian framework of archetypes, particularly the Great Mother and the archetype of the creative individual, which he associated with Great Individuals -figures who embody transformative creative forces in culture and history.

Additionally, Neumann developed the concept of centroversion, which he described as the integration of extraversion and introversion in the process of individuation. He argued that a mature ego must harmonize both conscious and unconscious elements to fully integrate along the ego-self axis, facilitating both individual and cultural development.

== Bibliography ==
Erich Neumann published extensively in the fields of analytical and depth psychology, mythology, and the evolution of consciousness. His works explore the archetypal structures of the psyche, the development of consciousness, and the role of creativity in psychology. Several of his books were published posthumously, based on manuscripts completed before his death.

| Title (German) | Title (English Translation, Year) | Publication year |
|---|---|---|
| Tiefenpsychologie und neue Ethik | Depth Psychology and a New Ethic (1955) | 1949 |
| Ursprungsgeschichte des Bewusstseins | The Origins and History of Consciousness (1954) | 1949 |
| Amor und Psyche | Amor and Psyche: The Psychic Development of the Feminine (1956) | 1952 |
| Umkreisung der Mitte | The Circle of the Center | 1953/54 |
| Die große Mutter. Der Archetyp des großen Weiblichen | The Great Mother: An Analysis of the Archetype (1955) | 1956 |
| Der schöpferische Mensch | Art and the Creative Unconscious (1959) | 1959 |
| Die archetypische Welt Henry Moores | The Archetypal World of Henry Moore | 1961 (posthumous) |
| Krise und Erneuerung | Crisis and Renewal | 1961 (posthumous) |
| Das Kind. Struktur und Dynamik der werdenden Persönlichkeit | The Child: Structure and Dynamics of the Nascent Personality (1973) | 1963 (posthumous) |
| | The Fear of the Feminine: and Other Essays on Feminine Psychology | 1994 |
| Jacob et Esaü: L'archétype des frères ennemis, un symbole du judaïsme | Jacob and Esau: Reflection on the Brother Motif (Chiron Publications) | 2015 (posthumous) |
| | Analytical Psychology in Exile: The Correspondence of C. G. Jung and Erich Neumann | 2015 (posthumous) |
| | The Roots of Jewish Consciousness, Volume One: Revelation and Apocalypse | 2019 (posthumous) |
| | The Roots of Jewish Consciousness, Volume Two: Hasidism | 2019 (posthumous) |

Other Works:

- Neumann also wrote a small amount of poetry, a novel titled Der Anfang (The Beginning), and published a critical study of Franz Kafka's works in 1932, at a time when Kafka was still a relatively obscure figure.
