= Free Women, Free Men =

2017 book by Camille Paglia

Free Women, Free Men: Sex, Gender, Feminism
- Cover of the first edition
- Author: Camille Paglia
- Cover artist: Janet Hansen
- Language: English
- Subject: Feminism
- Publisher: Pantheon Books
- Publication date: 2017
- Publication place: United States
- Media type: Print (hard and paperback)
- Pages: 352
- ISBN: 978-0-375-42477-9
- OCLC: 960762431

Free Women, Free Men: Sex, Gender, Feminism is a 2017 essay collection by American academic and cultural critic Camille Paglia. Comprising previously published essays, the book's central principles, according to Paglia, are "free thought and free speech—open, mobile, and unconstrained by either liberal or conservative ideology"; she argues for an "enlightened feminism, animated by a courageous code of personal responsibility".

== Reception ==
Dwight Garner of The New York Times felt that, though the collection has moments where "she's a fearless public intellectual and more necessary than ever", Free Women, Free Men "[displays] her worst qualities". While praising Paglia's arguments as "incisive and worth tangling with", he found her vain and criticized the book as repetitive, opining that reading it "is like being stranded in a bar where the jukebox has only two songs, both by Pat Benatar." In Kirkus Reviews, it was stated of the essays that "to read a few is to read them all".

In The Province, Mark Abbott argued that although Paglia's views can be inflammatory, she "genuinely cares about the current state of education". Abbott also called the book "timely" and stated that it "serves as a good introductory text to Paglia 101".

The Huffington Post included the book in their list of "27 Nonfiction Books By Women Everyone Should Read This Year", stating that "at times infuriating, at times glittering, Paglia's prose is always biting and relentless."
