= V. M. Johnson =

American writer and leather activist

V. M. Johnson, also known as Viola Johnson and Mama Vi, born in 1950, is a leatherwoman, leather activist and author.

== Life ==
Johnson claims that when she was seventeen years old, a vampire gave her some of his own blood to drink and thus she became a vampire.

In the early 1970s, she joined the BDSM and leather scenes. In 1988, she became an honorary member of Tulsa Uniform Leather Seekers Association (T.U.L.S.A). In 2005, she started The Carter/Johnson Library & Collection, a "collection of thousands of books, magazines, posters, art, club and event pins, newspapers, event programs and ephemera showing leather, fetish, S/M erotic history".

She was a judge for many leather-related contests, including Ms. World Leather.

She is on the board of governors for the Leather Hall of Fame.

She was on the board of directors of the Leather Archives & Museum and is a member of the Lesbian Sex Mafia. She is married to Jill Carter.

== Notable awards ==
- 1995: National Leather Association's Jan Lyon Award for Regional or Local Work
- 1995: National Leather Association Lifetime Achievement Award
- 1995: Pantheon of Leather Lifetime Achievement Award (Johnson was the first person to receive the National Leather Association Lifetime Achievement Award and the Pantheon of Leather Lifetime Achievement Award in the same year.)
- 1998: Pantheon of Leather Couple of the Year award (shared with Jill Carter and Queen Cougar)
- 2000: Pantheon of Leather Woman of the Year
- 2005: SouthEast LeatherFest Jack Stice Memorial Community Service Award
- 2005: Master/slave Conference slave Heart Award
- 2005: Pantheon of Leather Forebear Award (tied for the win with David S. Kloss)
- 2007: Black Beat Lifetime Achievement Award (This was the first Lifetime Achievement Award given by Black Beat.)
- 2012: Master/slave Conference Guy Baldwin Master/slave Heritage Award
- 2012: National Gay and Lesbian Task Force Leather Leadership Award (Johnson was the first woman to be given this award.)
- 2018: The Carter/Johnson Library & Collection received the Nonprofit Organization of the Year award as part of the Pantheon of Leather Awards.
- Unknown date: Induction into the Society of Janus Hall of Fame
- 2021: Leather Archives & Museum’s Chuck Renslow & Tony DeBlase Founders’ Award

== Works ==
Books

- V. M. Johnson, Dhampir: Child of the Blood. Mystic Rose Books, 1995. ISBN 978-0-9645960-1-6
- Laura Antoniou (ed.),Some Women. Masquerade Books, Inc, 1995 (contributed "Journal entries")
- V. M. Johnson, To Love, to Obey, to Serve: Diary of an Old Guard Slave Mystic Rose Books, 1999. ISBN 978-0-9645960-2-3

Contributing author, notable periodicals

- Black Leather in Color
- Black Mistress Review
