= Gayle Rubin =

American cultural anthropologist and activist (born 1949)

Gayle S. Rubin
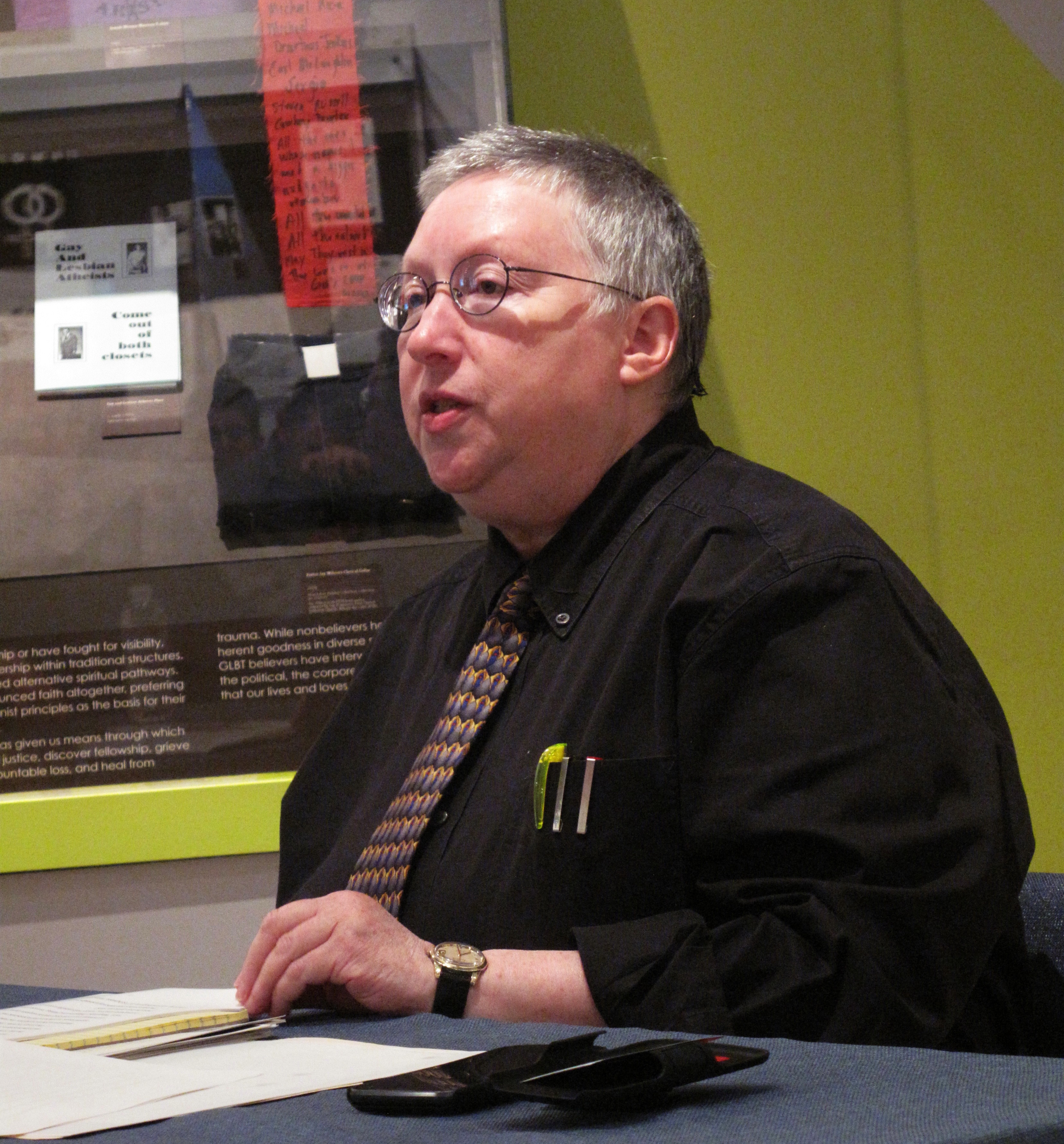
- Rubin speaking at the GLBT History Museum in San Francisco, June 7, 2012
- Born: January 1, 1949 (age 77); South Carolina

Academic background
- Education: University of Michigan
- Thesis: The Valley of the Kings: Leathermen in San Francisco, 1960–1990 (1994)

Academic work
- Discipline: Cultural anthropology
- Institutions: University of Michigan
- Influenced: Judith Butler, Susan Stryker

Gayle S. Rubin (born January 1, 1949) is an American cultural anthropologist, theorist and activist, best known for her pioneering work in feminist theory and queer studies. Her essay "The Traffic in Women" (1975) had a lasting influence in second-wave feminism and early gender studies, by arguing that gender oppression could not be adequately explained by Marxist conceptions of the patriarchy. Her 1984 essay "Thinking Sex" is widely regarded as a founding text of gay and lesbian studies, sexuality studies, and queer theory. She has written on a range of subjects including the politics of sexuality, gender oppression, sadomasochism, pornography and lesbian literature, as well as anthropological studies of urban sexual subcultures, and is an associate professor of Anthropology and Women's Studies at the University of Michigan.

== Biography ==
=== Early life ===
Rubin was raised in a middle-class Jewish home in then-segregated South Carolina. She attended segregated public schools, her classes only being desegregated when she was a senior. Rubin has written that her experiences growing up in the segregated South has given her "an abiding hatred of racism in all its forms and a healthy respect for its tenacity." As one of the few Jews in her Southern city, she resented the dominance of white Protestants over African-Americans, Catholics, and Jews. The only Jewish child in her elementary school, she writes that she was punished for refusing to recite the Lord's Prayer.

=== College, early activism, and early writing ===
In 1968 Rubin was part of an early feminist consciousness raising group active on the campus of the University of Michigan and also wrote on feminist topics for women's movement papers and the Ann Arbor Argus. In 1970 she helped found Ann Arbor Radicalesbians, an early lesbian feminist group. She was also a graduate worker in 1975, when the Graduate Employees' Organization 3550 was formed at the University of Michigan. At the time, she and Anne Bobroff, a fellow graduate student, wrote and distributed a leaflet titled "The Fetishization of Bargaining", which argued that bargaining alone is not enough to convince management. Rubin first rose to recognition through her 1975 essay "The Traffic in Women: Notes on the 'Political Economy' of Sex", which had a galvanizing effect on feminist theory.

=== San Francisco ===
In 1978 Rubin moved to San Francisco to begin studies of the gay male leather subculture, seeking to examine a minority sexual practice neither from a clinical perspective nor through the lens of individual psychology but rather as an anthropologist studying a contemporary community. Rubin was a member of Cardea, a women's discussion group within a San Francisco BDSM organization called the Society of Janus; Cardea existed from 1977 to 1978 before discontinuing. A core of lesbian members of Cardea, including Rubin, Pat Califia (who identified as a lesbian at the time), and sixteen others, were inspired to start Samois on June 13, 1978, as an exclusively lesbian BDSM group. Samois was a lesbian-feminist BDSM organization based in San Francisco that existed from 1978 to 1983, and was the first lesbian BDSM group in the United States. In 1984, Rubin cofounded The Outcasts, a social and educational organization for women interested in BDSM with other women, also based in San Francisco. That organization was disbanded in the mid-1990s; its successor organization The Exiles is still active. In 2012, The Exiles in San Francisco received the Small Club of the Year award as part of the Pantheon of Leather Awards.

In the field of public history, Rubin was a member of the San Francisco Lesbian and Gay History Project, a private study group founded in 1978 whose members included Allan Berube, Estelle Freedman and Amber Hollibaugh. Rubin also is a founding member of the GLBT Historical Society (originally known as the San Francisco Bay Area Gay and Lesbian Historical Society), established in 1985. Arguing the need for well-maintained historical archives for sexual minorities, Rubin has written that "queer life is full of examples of fabulous explosions that left little or no detectable trace.... Those who fail to secure the transmission of their histories are doomed to forget them". She became the first woman to judge a major national gay male leather title contest in 1991, when she judged the Mr. Drummer contest. This contest was associated with Drummer magazine, which was based in San Francisco. The San Francisco South of Market Leather History Alley consists of four works of art along Ringold Alley honoring the leather subculture; it opened in 2017. One of the works of art is a black granite stone etched with, among other things, a narrative by Rubin. Rubin was an important member of the community advisory group that was consulted to develop the designs of the works of art.

=== Academic career ===
In 1994, Rubin completed her Ph.D. in anthropology at the University of Michigan with a dissertation entitled The Valley of the Kings: Leathermen in San Francisco, 1960–1990. In addition to her appointment at the University of Michigan, she was the 2014 F. O. Matthiessen Visiting Professor of Gender and Sexuality at Harvard University. Rubin serves on the editorial board of the journal Feminist Encounters and on the international advisory board of the feminist journal Signs.

=== Other ===
Rubin is a sex-positive feminist. The 1982 Barnard Conference on Sexuality is often credited as the moment that signaled the beginning of the feminist sex wars; Rubin gave a version of her work "Thinking Sex" as a workshop there. In 1985, "Thinking Sex" had its first publication in Carole Vance's book Pleasure and Danger, which was an anthology of papers from that conference. "Thinking Sex" is a sex-positive piece, which is widely regarded as a founding text of gay and lesbian studies, sexuality studies, and queer theory. Rubin served on the board of directors of the Leather Archives and Museum from 1992 to 2000. Rubin is on the Selection Committee for the Leather Hall of Fame.

== Thought ==
=== The Traffic in Women: Notes on the 'Political Economy' of Sex ===
In this essay, Rubin devised the phrase "sex/gender system", which she defines as "the set of arrangements by which a society transforms biological sexuality into products of human activity, and in which these transformed sexual needs are satisfied." She takes as a starting point writers who have previously discussed gender and sexual relations as an economic institution which serves a conventional social function (Claude Lévi-Strauss) and is reproduced in the psychology of children (Sigmund Freud and Jacques Lacan). She argues that these writers fail to adequately explain women's oppression, and offers a reinterpretation of their ideas. Rubin addresses Marxist thought by identifying women's role within a capitalist society.

Rubin argues that the reproduction of labor power depends upon women's housework to transform commodities into sustenance for the worker. The system of capitalism cannot generate surplus without women, yet society does not grant women access to the resulting capital. She further argues that historical patterns of female oppression have constructed this role for women in capitalist societies. She attempts to analyze these historical patterns by considering the sex/gender system. According to Rubin, "Gender is a socially imposed division of the sexes." She cites the exchange of women within patriarchal societies as perpetuating the pattern of female oppression, referencing Marcel Mauss' Essay on the Gift, and also using his idea of the "gift" to establish the notion that gender is created within this exchange of women by men in a kinship system. Women are born biologically female, but only become gendered when the distinction between male giver and female gift is made within this exchange. For men, giving the gift of a daughter or a sister to another man for the purpose of matrimony allows for the formation of kinship ties between two men and the transfer of "sexual access, genealogical statuses, lineage names and ancestors, rights and people" to occur. When using a Marxist analysis of capitalism within this sex/gender system, the exclusion of women from the system of exchange establishes men as the capitalists and women as their commodities fit for exchange. She ultimately argues that, in the current moment, a genderless identity and a polymorphous sexuality with no hierarchies are possible if we break away from the "now functionless" sex/gender system.

=== Thinking Sex ===
In her 1984 essay Thinking Sex, Rubin interrogated the value system that social groups—whether left- or right-wing, feminist or patriarchal—attribute to sexuality which defines some behaviours as good/natural and others (such as homosexuality or BDSM) as bad/unnatural. In this essay she introduced the idea of the "Charmed Circle" of sexuality, that sexuality that was privileged by society was inside of it, while all other sexuality was outside of, and in opposition to it. The binaries of this "charmed circle" include couple/alone or in groups, monogamous/promiscuous, same generation/cross-generational, and bodies only/with manufactured objects. The "Charmed Circle" speaks to the idea that there is a hierarchical valuation of sex acts. In this essay, Rubin also discusses a number of ideological formations that permeate sexual views. The most important is sex negativity, in which Western cultures consider sex to be a dangerous, destructive force. If marriage, reproduction, or love are not involved, almost all sexual behavior is considered bad. Related to sex negativity is the fallacy of the misplaced scale. Rubin explains how sex acts are troubled by an excess of significance. Rubin's discussion of all of these models assumes a domino theory of sexual peril. People feel a need to draw a line between good and bad sex as they see it standing between sexual order and chaos. There is a fear that if certain aspects of "bad" sex are allowed to move across the line, unspeakable acts will move across as well. One of the most prevalent ideas about sex is that there is one proper way to do it. Society lacks a concept of benign sexual variation. People fail to recognize that just because they do not like to do something does not make it repulsive. Rubin points out that we have learned to value other cultures as unique without seeing them as inferior, and we need to adopt a similar understanding of different sexual cultures as well.

==== Legacy of Thinking Sex ====
Rubin's 1984 essay Thinking Sex is widely regarded as a founding text of gay and lesbian studies, sexuality studies, and queer theory. The University of Pennsylvania hosted a "state of the field" conference in gender and sexuality studies on March 4 to 6, 2009, titled "Rethinking Sex" and held in recognition of the twenty-fifth anniversary of Thinking Sex. Rubin was a featured speaker at the conference, where she presented "Blood under the Bridge: Reflections on 'Thinking Sex,'" to an audience of nearly eight hundred people. In 2011 GLQ: A Journal of Lesbian and Gay Studies published a special issue, also titled "Rethinking Sex," featuring work emerging from this conference, and including Rubin's piece "Blood under the Bridge: Reflections on 'Thinking Sex'".

In "Thinking Sex", Rubin defended "man-boy lovers" alongside sex workers, homosexuals, and BDSM practitioners, a stance that has attracted a great deal of criticism in the years since. In a 2011 reflection on "Thinking Sex", Rubin clarified that her "comments on sex and children were made in a different context", at a time in the 1980s when moral panics about Satanists and kidnappers were prevalent, and she never imagined people would claim she "supported the rape of pre-pubescents." She stated that her writings had been misconstrued by right-wingers and anti-pornography advocates.

== Awards and honors ==
- 2019: Race Bannon Advocacy Award from the National Coalition for Sexual Freedom
- 2017: The San Francisco South of Market Leather History Alley consists of four works of art along Ringold Alley honoring the leather subculture; it opened in 2017. One of the works of art is a black granite stone etched with, among other things, a narrative by Rubin. Rubin was an important member of the community advisory group that was consulted to develop the designs of the works of art.
- 2012: Her book Deviations: A Gayle Rubin Reader received the National Leather Association's Geoff Mains Non-fiction book award for 2012.
- 2012: Ruth Benedict Prize
- 2003: David R. Kessler Award for LGBTQ Studies, CLAGS: The Center for LGBTQ Studies
- 2000: Leather Archives and Museum "Centurion"
- 2000: National Leather Association Lifetime Achievement Award
- 1992: Pantheon of Leather Forebear Award
- 1988: National Leather Association Jan Lyon Award for Regional or Local Work
- Unknown date: Induction into the Society of Janus Hall of Fame

== Writings ==
- Deviations: A Gayle Rubin Reader (Durham, NC: Duke University Press, 2012).
- "Samois", in Marc Stein, ed., Encyclopedia of Lesbian, Gay, Bisexual, and Transgender History in America (New York: Charles Scribner's Sons, 2003). (PDF download.)
- "Studying Sexual Subcultures: the Ethnography of Gay Communities in Urban North America", in Ellen Lewin and William Leap, eds., Out in Theory: The Emergence of Lesbian and Gay Anthropology. (Urbana: University of Illinois Press, 2002)
- "Old Guard, New Guard", in Cuir Underground, Issue 4.2, Summer 1998. (Online text.)
- "Sites, Settlements, and Urban Sex: Archaeology And The Study of Gay Leathermen in San Francisco 1955–1995", in Robert Schmidt and Barbara Voss, eds., Archaeologies of Sexuality (London: Routledge, 2000).
- "The Miracle Mile: South of Market and Gay Male Leather in San Francisco 1962–1996", in James Brook, Chris Carlsson, and Nancy Peters, eds., Reclaiming San Francisco: History, Politics, Culture (San Francisco: City Lights Books, 1998).
- "From the Past: The Outcasts" from the newsletter of Leather Archives & Museum No. 4, April 1998.
- "Music from a Bygone Era", in Cuir Underground, Issue 3.4, May 1997. (Online text.)
- "Elegy for the Valley of the Kings: AIDS and the Leather Community in San Francisco, 1981–1996", in Martin P. Levine, Peter M. Nardi, and John H. Gagnon, eds. In Changing Times: Gay Men and Lesbians Encounter HIV/AIDS (University of Chicago Press, 1997).
- The valley of kings: Leathermen in San Francisco, 1960–1990. University of Michigan, 1994. (Doctoral dissertation.)
- "Of catamites and kings: Reflections on butch, gender, and boundaries", in Joan Nestle (Ed). The Persistent Desire. A Femme-Butch-Reader. Boston: Alyson. 466 (1992).
- Misguided, Dangerous and Wrong: An Analysis of Anti-Pornography Politics, 1992. (PDF download)
- "The Catacombs: A temple of the butthole", in Mark Thompson, ed., Leatherfolk — Radical Sex, People, Politics, and Practice, Boston, Alyson Publications, 1991, ISBN 1555831877, pp. 119–141, reprinted in Deviations. A Gayle Rubin Reader, Duke University Press, 2011, ISBN 0822349868, pp. 224–240, pdf, retrieved September 30, 2014.
- "Thinking Sex: Notes for a Radical Theory of the Politics of Sexuality", in Carole Vance, ed., Pleasure and Danger (Routledge & Kegan, Paul, 1984. Also reprinted in many other collections, including Abelove, H.; Barale, M. A.; Halperin, D. M.), The Lesbian and Gay Studies Reader (New York: Routledge, 1994).
- "The Leather Menace", Body Politic no. 82 (33–35), April 1982.
- "Sexual Politics, the New Right, and the Sexual Fringe" in The Age Taboo, Alyson, 1981, pp. 108–115.
- "The Traffic in Women: Notes on the 'Political Economy' of Sex", in Rayna Reiter, ed., Toward an Anthropology of Women, New York, Monthly Review Press (1975); reprinted in Nicholson, Linda, ed., The second wave: a reader in feminist theory, New York: Routledge, 1997 pp. 27–62, ISBN 9780415917612. (PDF download.)

== See also ==
- Feminist anthropology
- Feminist sexology

Academic offices
Preceded by Henry Abelove	F. O. Matthiessen Visiting Professorship of Gender and Sexuality at Harvard University; 2014 – 2015	Succeeded by Robert Reid-Pharr
