= The Outcasts (organization) =

American women's BDSM organization

The Outcasts was a social and educational organization for women interested in BDSM with other women that was founded in San Francisco in 1984. It grew partly from earlier groups, the Society of Janus and Samois. Gayle Rubin was a co-founder of the organization. Other members included Dorothy Allison, Pat Califia, and Dossie Easton.

In the 1980s and 1990s, The Outcasts sponsored community events such as Butch Fashion Shows, the first SF Dyke Daddy contest, many dances, and even a night to “take the perverts bowling”. They began promoting safer sex in 1985. By 1986 they were having newcomer orientations, had officers, bylaws and a logo as well as a newsletter, The Lunatic Fringe. In 1986, The Outcasts joined Society of Janus and other groups in the San Francisco Pride Parade's first leather contingent.

The Outcasts was disbanded in the mid-1990s; its successor organization The Exiles is still active. In 2012, The Exiles in San Francisco received the Small Club of the Year award as part of the Pantheon of Leather Awards.
