= Cynthia Slater =

American sex activist (1945–1989)

- Born: August 7, 1945
- Died: October 26, 1989 (aged 44)
- Occupations: Activist, sex educator, dominatrix
- Writing career
- Subjects: Activism, BDSM
- Notable work: Co-founding Society of Janus

Cynthia Slater (August 7, 1945 – October 26, 1989) was an American sex educator, HIV/AIDS activist, and dominatrix. She was the co-founder of the second BDSM organization founded in the United States (after The Eulenspiegel Society), a San Francisco, California based BDSM education and support group known as the Society of Janus, which she founded with Larry Olsen in August 1974.

== Work ==
Slater's activism for women to be accepted within the gay leather scene in San Francisco during the late 1970s brought her to more mainstream attention. Slater persuaded the management of San Francisco's S/M leather club the Catacombs, the most famous fisting club in the world, to open up to lesbians; it was originally a gay men's club. It operated from 1975 to 1981, and reopened at another location from 1982 to 1984. Slater was also an early proponent of S/M safety, and one of the major AIDS activists and educators during the 1980s. Slater hosted Society of Janus safety demonstrations during the late 1970s, cultivating a space for women within the 'plurality of gay men' already present within the leather/kink/fetish Venn-diagramatic culture.

According to the Leather Hall of Fame biography of Slater, she said of the Society of Janus,

"There were three basic reasons why we chose Janus. First of all, Janus has two faces, which we interpreted as the duality of SM (one’s dominant and submissive sides). Second, he’s the Roman god of portals, and more importantly, of beginnings and endings. To us, it represents the beginning of one’s acceptance of self, the beginning of freedom from guilt, and the eventual ending of self-loathing and fear over one’s SM desires. And third, Janus is the Roman god of war—the war we fight against stereotypes commonly held against us."

According to first-hand accounts, she coined the term "SM 101", referring to the safety demonstrations and classes she presented. As well, in 1981 Slater and David Lourea "presented safer-sex education workshops in bathhouses and BDSM clubs in San Francisco." In 1985, Slater, who was HIV-positive, organized the first Women's HIV/AIDS Information Switchboard. She also contributed to "developing and disseminating kink friendly safer sex technologies".

She was photographed by Robert Mapplethorpe in 1980. She was a professional dominatrix; and was openly bisexual.

== Death ==
On October 26, 1989, Slater died of AIDS complications. She is among those commemorated in the AIDS Memorial Quilt.

== Awards and honors ==
In 1989, she received the National Leather Association International’s Jan Lyon Award for Regional or Local Work.

In 2003, she received the Forebear Award as part of the Pantheon of Leather Awards.

In 2007, the National Leather Association International inaugurated awards for excellence in SM/fetish/leather writing. The categories include the Cynthia Slater award for non-fiction article.

In 2014, Slater was inducted into the Leather Hall of Fame.

In 2017, the art installation known as the San Francisco South of Market Leather History Alley was installed; in it Slater is honored with a metal bootprint displaying her name and a short statement about her.

She is an inductee of the Society of Janus Hall of Fame.
