= Leather Hall of Fame =

International leather subculture hall of fame

- Formation: 2009; 17 years ago
- Type: Nonprofit
- Location: Palm Springs, California
- Website: leatherhalloffame.com

The Leather Hall of Fame is an institution founded in 2009 to honor persons and entities who have made significant contributions to the leather and BDSM communities.

== About ==
The Leather Hall of Fame was developed by leather community activists Bob Miller, Jeff Willoughby, and Race Bannon in collaboration with anthropologist Gayle Rubin as a way to recognize key figures in leather history. The first induction ceremony was held during Cleveland Leather Annual Weekend in 2009.

In addition to the founders, past and current selection committee members have included leather activist V. M. Johnson, researcher Robert Bienvenu, and therapist Guy Baldwin.

== Inductees ==
Inductees of the Hall of Fame can be any individuals, organizations, or institutions that have made contributions to the leather community and the history of kinky subcultures since 1950, with contributions beginning at least 25 years ago.

Leather Hall of Fame
Name	Inductee year	Area of achievement
Chuck Renslow	2009	Co-founder with Tony DeBlase of the Leather Archives & Museum, co-founder with Dom Orejudos of the Gold Coast bar and Man's Country bathhouse, and the founder by himself alone of Chicago's August White Party, and the magazines Triumph, Rawhide, and Mars
Tom of Finland	2009	Artist
John Willie	2009	Artist
Tony DeBlase	2010	Author and designer of the leather pride flag
Frank Olson & Don Morrison	2010	Founders of the first Eagle NYC bar
Satyrs Motorcycle Club	2010	One of the oldest continuously operating gay organizations in the United States
Bob Milne	2011	"[O]ne of the founders of the gay male SM movement in New York City"
The Eulenspiegel Society	2011	First BDSM organization founded in the United States
Leonard Burtman	2011	Publisher of Exotique magazine
Samuel Steward	2012	Tattoo artist and pornographer
Irving Klaw	2012	Merchandiser of fetish art imagery and films
Guy Baldwin	2012	Psychotherapist, author, and activist
Dom Orejudos	2012	Artist, ballet dancer, and choreographer
Alan Selby	2013	Businessman and leader in the San Francisco leather community, known as "the Mayor of Folsom Street"
Monique Von Cleef	2013	Dominatrix
Cynthia Slater	2014	Sex educator, HIV/AIDS activist, dominatrix, and co-founder of the BDSM organization known as the Society of Janus
John Embry	2014	Co-founder of Drummer
Chicago Hellfire Club	2014	One of the oldest BDSM leather organizations in the United States
Pat Bond & Terry Kolb	2015	Co-founders of The Eulenspiegel Society, the first BDSM organization founded in the United States
Jeanne C. Barney	2015	Journalist, co-founder of Drummer
Felix Jones	2015	Co-founder of the Sixty Nine Club, a motorcycle and social club for gay leathermen, and co-founder of the ﬁrst gay men's rubber club in Europe, the Rubber Man‘s Club, and co-founder of ECMC, a schedule coordinator and clearing house for all such clubs; "Pioneer of the European Leatherscene"
James (Jim) Kane	2016	Early leatherman
Jim Stewart	2016	Owner of bondage gear company FETTERS, designer of new bondage gear, wrote about bondage
Larry Townsend	2016	Wrote about the leather community
MSC Hamburg e. V.	2017	Gay leather club
Peter Fiske	2017	Leatherman
Durk Dehner	2017	Co-founder of the Tom of Finland Foundation and the Tom of Finland Company
Black Leather ... In Color	2018	Leather magazine written by and for people of color
Society of Janus	2018	The second BDSM organization founded in the United States (after The Eulenspiegel Society); it is a San Francisco, California-based BDSM education and support group
International Mr. Leather	2018	The world's oldest continuously operating international leather and fetish event
Leather Archives and Museum	2019	Community archives, library, and museum
Fakir Musafar	2019	A performance artist considered to be one of the founders of the modern primitive movement
Samois	2019	The first lesbian BDSM group in the United States
Pauline Réage	2020	Pen name of Anne Desclos, author of the sadistic erotic novel called the Story of O
Jim Ward	2020	Body piercer
MLC Munich	2020	Gay fetish club
Jack McGeorge	2021	A founder of Black Rose, an officer of the Leather Leadership Conference, a Director of the National Coalition for Sexual Freedom, and a Chairman of the Community-Academic Consortium for Research on Alternative Sexualities
Jack Jackson	2021	The first president of The Eulenspiegel Society; to “signal that he was forever one with the title”, The Eulenspiegel Society has not had a president since, leaving him as its only one
SM Gays	2021	One of London's first gay men's support groups with a focus on BDSM
The 15 Association	2022	One of the oldest BDSM clubs, founded in 1980, in San Francisco
Gay Male S/M Activists (GMSMA)	2022	Organization for gay men focused on BDSM in New York
REX	2022	Gay fetish artist
SNC London	2023	First gay motorcycle/leather club in Europe
John Sutcliffe	2023	Fetish clothing designer and publisher of the fetish magazine AtomAge
Robert Meijer	2023	Founder (in 1974) of RoB brand, a brand of gear for leather and other kink, first sold in Amsterdam; RoB stores expanded to Berlin, London, Paris, New York City, and San Francisco
Dave Rhodes	2024	Founder (in 1987) of The Leather Journal, a publication about the leather community, and judge of over 450 leather contests, including judging International Mr. Leather four times
Jill Carter	2024	The first Black International Ms. Leather (in 1996)
Constance Slater	2024	Author and owner of Dressing for Pleasure Exotic Boutique
Geoff Mains	2025	Author of, among other publications, the book Urban Aboriginals: A Celebration of Leather Sexuality (1984)
Charles Guyette	2025	A pioneer of fetish style, the first person in the United States to produce and distribute fetish art, and regarded as the mail-order predecessor of Irving Klaw; later known as the "G-String King," he is best remembered for his fetish photographs, some of which featured sadomasochistic content
Drummer	2025	A magazine which focuses on “leathersex, leatherwear, leather and rubber gear, S&M, bondage and discipline, erotic styles and techniques”
Catherine Robbe-Grillet	2026	Writer of sadomasochistic writings including The Image, actress, and dominatrix
Race Bannon	2026	Leather, LGBTQ, polyamory, and HIV/STI prevention organizer, educator, writer, speaker, and activist
Master Taíno	2026	Leather organizer

== See also ==
- Chicago LGBT Hall of Fame
- LGBTQ culture
