= Sex-positive feminism =

Branch of feminism that emphasizes sexual freedoms

Sex-positive feminism, also known as pro-sex feminism, sex-radical feminism, or sexually liberal feminism, is a feminist movement centering on the idea that sexual freedom is an essential component of women's freedom. They oppose legal or social efforts to control sexual activities between consenting adults, whether they are initiated by the government, other feminists, opponents of feminism, or any other institution. They embrace sexual minority groups, endorsing the value of coalition-building with marginalized groups. Sex-positive feminism is connected with the sex-positive movement. Sex-positive feminism brings together anti-censorship activists, LGBT activists, feminist scholars, producers of pornography and erotica, among others. Sex-positive feminists believe that prostitution can be a positive experience if workers are treated with respect, and agree that sex work should not be criminalized.

== Key ideas ==
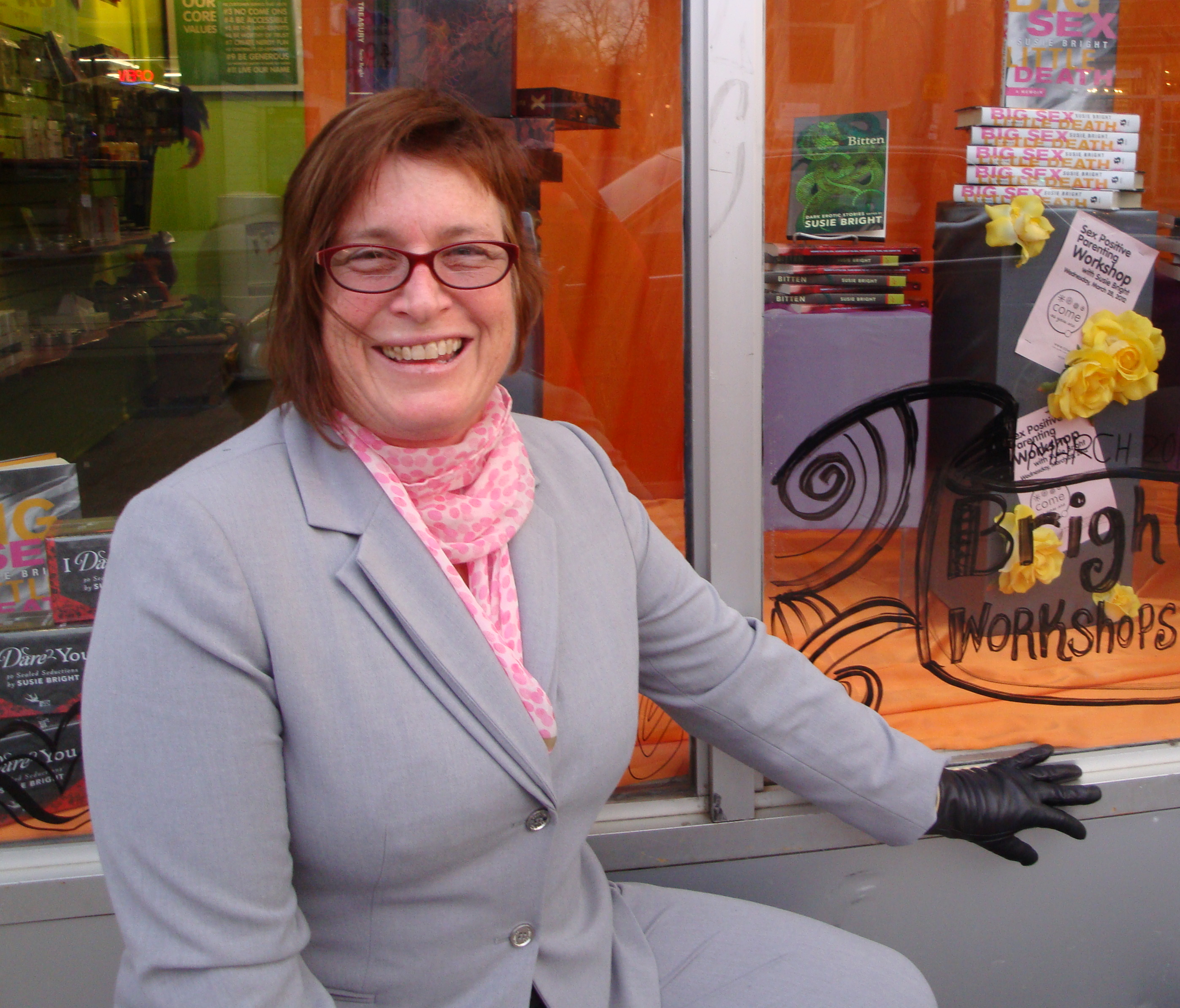
Susie Bright, a writer and activist, one of the first persons to be referred to as a sex-positive feminist

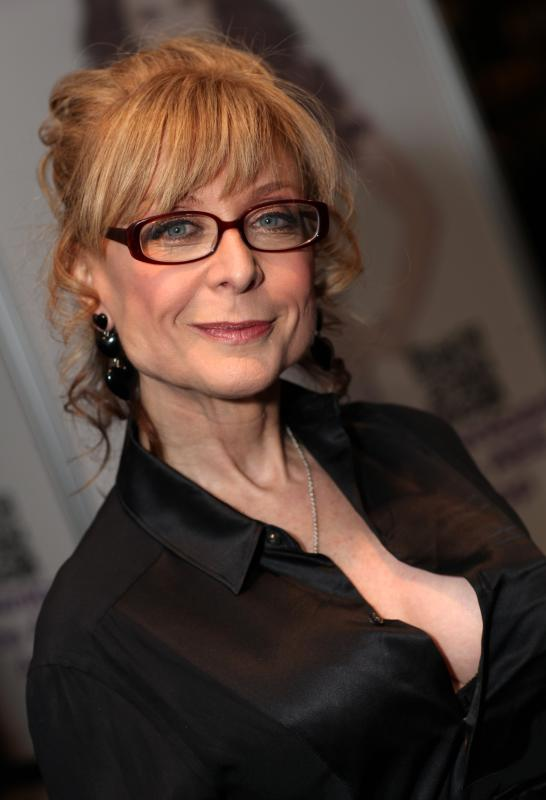
Nina Hartley, a pornographic film actress who promotes sex positivity

Gayle Rubin summarizes the conflict over sex within feminism. She says that one feminist stream criticizes the sexual constraints and difficulties faced by sexually active women (e.g., access to abortion), while another stream views sexual liberalization as an extension of "male privilege."

Sex-positive feminists reject the vilification of male sexuality that many attribute to radical feminism, and instead embrace the entire range of human sexuality. They argue that the patriarchy limits sexual expression and are in favor of giving people of all genders more sexual opportunities, rather than restricting pornography. Sex-positive feminists generally reject sexual essentialism, defined by Rubin as "the idea that sex is a natural force that exists prior to social life and shapes institutions." Rather, they see sexual orientation and gender as social constructs that are heavily influenced by society.

Some radical feminists reject the dichotomy of "sex-positive" and "sex-negative" feminism, suggesting that instead, the real divide is between liberal feminism and radical feminism.

Sex-radical feminists in particular, come to a sex-positive stance from a deep distrust in the patriarchy's ability to secure women's best interest in sexually limiting laws. Other feminists identify women's sexual liberation as the real motive behind the women's movement. Naomi Wolf writes, "Orgasm is the body's natural call to feminist politics." Sharon Presley, the National Coordinator of the Association of Libertarian Feminists, wrote that in the area of sexuality, government blatantly discriminates against women.

The social background in which sex-positive feminism operates must also be understood: Christian societies are often influenced by what is understood as 'traditional' sexual morality: according to the Christian doctrine, sexual activity must only take place in marriage, and must be vaginal intercourse; sexual acts outside marriage and 'unnatural sex' (i.e. oral, anal sex, termed as "sodomy") are forbidden; yet forced sexual intercourse within marriage is not seen as immoral by a few social and religious conservatives, owing to the existence of so-called 'conjugal rights' defined in the Bible at 1 Corinthians 7:3-5.

Such organization of sexuality has increasingly come under legal and social attack in recent decades. (Note: For criminalization of sexual violence in marriage see Marital rape and Marital rape (US law). For decriminalization of "sodomy" see Sodomy law and Sodomy laws in the United States.)

In addition, in certain cultures, particularly in Mediterranean countries influenced by Roman Catholicism, traditional ideas of masculinity and female purity are still influential. This has led to what many interpret as a double standard between male and female sexuality; men are expected to be sexually assertive as a way of affirming their masculinity, but for a woman to be considered 'good', she must remain pure. Indeed, Cesare Lombroso claimed in his book, The Female Offender, that women could be categorized into three types: the Criminal Woman, the Prostitute, and the Normal Woman. As such, highly sexed women (prostitutes) were deemed as abnormal.

Feminists "ranging from Betty Friedan and Kate Millett to Karen DeCrow, Wendy Kaminer and Jamaica Kincaid" supported the right to consume pornography. Feminists who have advocated a sex-positive position include writer Kathy Acker, academic Camille Paglia, sex educator Megan Andelloux, Susie Bright, Rachel Kramer Bussel, Diana Cage, Avedon Carol, Patrick Califia, Betty Dodson, Nancy Friday, Jane Gallop, Laci Green, porn performer Nina Hartley, Josephine Ho, Amber L. Hollibaugh, Brenda Howard, Laura Kipnis, Wendy McElroy, Inga Muscio, Joan Nestle, Marcia Pally, Carol Queen, Candida Royalle, Gayle Rubin, Annie Sprinkle, Tristan Taormino, Ellen Willis, and Mireille Miller- Young.

=== Sex positivity ===
According to sexologist and author Carol Queen, in an interview with researcher and professor Lynn Comella, "[sex positivity] is the cultural philosophy that understands sexuality as a potentially positive force in one's life, and it can be [...] contrasted with sex-negativity, which sees sex as problematic, disruptive, dangerous. Sex-positivity allows for and [...] celebrates sexual diversity, differing desires and relationships structures, and individual choices based on consent... [negative sexual experiences caused by lack of information, support, and choices] are the cultural conditions that sex-positivity allows us to point out as curtailers of healthy, enjoyable sexual experience."

Queen also added, "This sense that many of us were being denied space and credentials to speak for ourselves and speak about issues within our community is what [...] led to the efflorescence of sex-positive feminism. And it is why there is a sex-positive feminism and not just sex-positivity."

== Historical roots ==
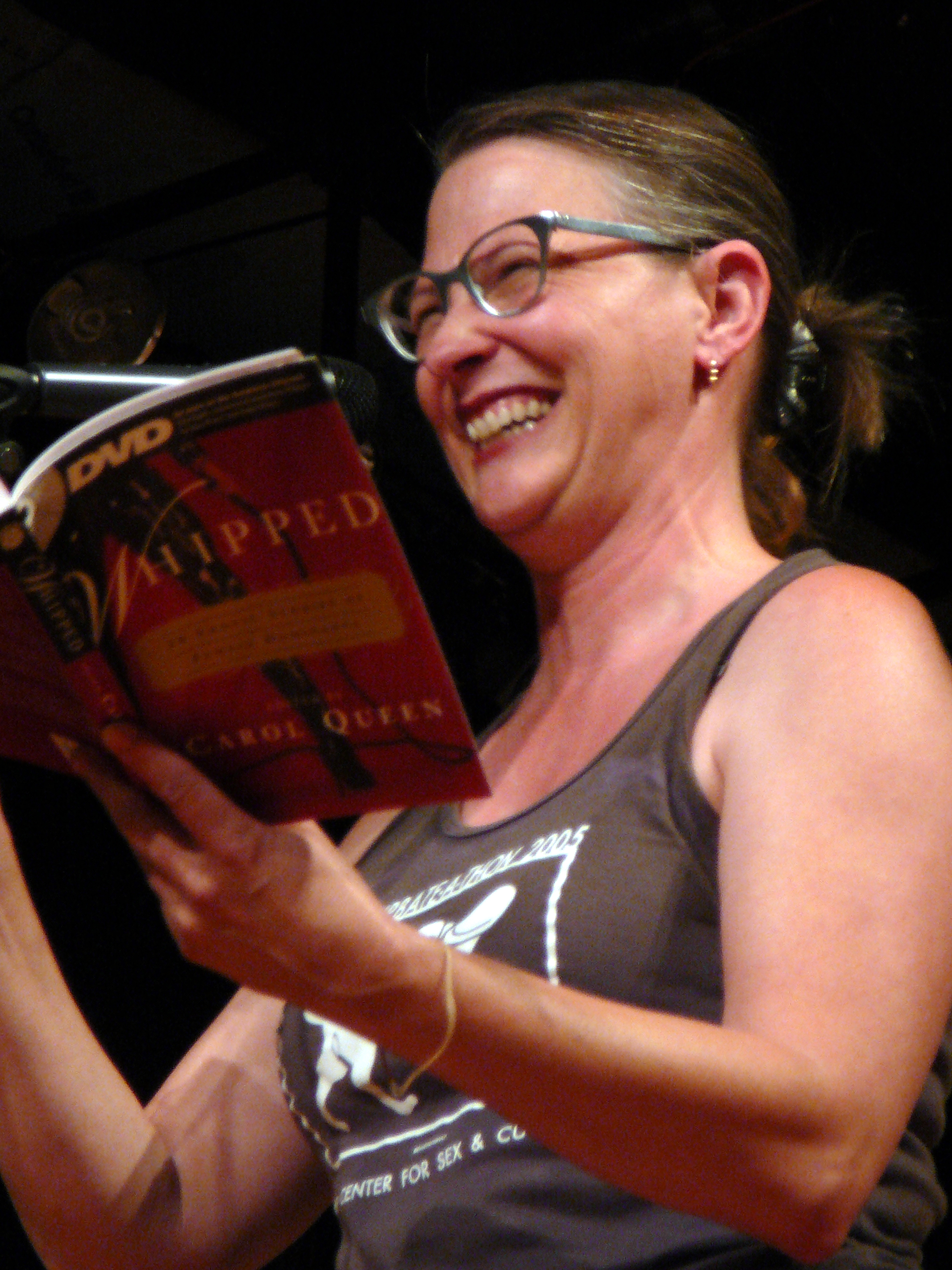
Carol Queen, a sexologist and sex-positive feminist

Authors such as Gayle Rubin and Wendy McElroy see the roots of sex-positive feminism stemming from the work of sex reformers and workers for sex education and access to contraception, such as Havelock Ellis, Margaret Sanger, Mary Dennett and, later, Alfred Kinsey and Shere Hite. However, the contemporary incarnation of sex-positive feminism appeared more recently, following an increasing feminist focus on pornography as a source of women's oppression in the 1970s.

The rise of second-wave feminism was concurrent with the sexual revolution and rulings that loosened legal restrictions on access to pornography. In the 1970s, radical feminists became increasingly focused on issues around sexuality in a patriarchal society. Some feminist groups began to concern themselves with prescribing what proper feminist sexuality should look like. This was especially characteristic of lesbian separatist groups, but some heterosexual women's groups, such as Redstockings, became engaged with this issue as well. On the other hand, there were also feminists, such as Betty Dodson, who saw women's sexual pleasure and masturbation as central to women's liberation. Pornography was not a major issue during this era; radical feminists were generally opposed to pornography, but the issue was not treated as especially important until the mid-1970s.

There were, however, feminist prostitutes-rights advocates, such as COYOTE, which campaigned for the decriminalization of prostitution.

The late 1970s found American culture becoming increasingly concerned about the aftermath of a decade of greater sexual freedom, including concerns about explicit violent and sexual imagery in the media, the mainstreaming of pornography, increased sexual activity among teenagers, and issues such as the dissemination of child pornography and the purported rise of "snuff films". (Critics maintain that this atmosphere amounted to a moral panic, which reached its peak in the mid-1980s.). These concerns were reflected in the feminist movement, with radical feminist groups claiming that pornography was a central underpinning of patriarchy and a direct cause of violence against women. Robin Morgan summarized this idea in her statement, "Pornography is the theory; rape the practice."

Andrea Dworkin and Robin Morgan began articulating a vehemently anti-porn stance based in radical feminism beginning in 1974, and anti-porn feminist groups, such as Women Against Pornography and similar organizations, became highly active in various US cities during the late 1970s. As anti-porn feminists broadened their criticism and activism to include not only pornography, but prostitution and sadomasochism, other feminists became concerned about the direction the movement was taking and grew more critical of anti-porn feminism.

This included feminist BDSM practitioners (notably Samois), prostitutes-rights advocates, and many liberal and anti-authoritarian feminists for whom free speech, sexual freedom, and advocacy of women's agency were central concerns.

One of the earliest feminist arguments against this anti-pornography trend amongst feminists was Ellen Willis's essay "Feminism, Moralism, and Pornography" first published in October 1979 in the Village Voice. In response to the formation of Women Against Pornography in 1979, Willis wrote an article (the origin of the term, "pro-sex feminism"), expressing worries about anti-pornography feminists' attempts to make feminism into a single-issue movement, arguing that feminists should not issue a blanket condemnation against all pornography and that restrictions on pornography could just as easily be applied to speech that feminists found favorable to themselves.

Rubin calls for a new feminist theory of sex, saying that existing feminist thoughts on sex had frequently considered sexual liberalization as a trend that only increases male privilege. Rubin criticizes anti-pornography feminists who she claims "have condemned virtually every variant of sexual expression as anti-feminist," arguing that their view of sexuality is dangerously close to anti-feminist, conservative sexual morality. Rubin encourages feminists to consider the political aspects of sexuality without promoting sexual repression. She also argues that the blame for women's oppression should be put on targets who deserve it: "the family, religion, education, child-rearing practices, the media, the state, psychiatry, job discrimination, and unequal pay..." rather than on relatively un-influential sexual minorities.

McElroy (1995) argues that for feminists in the 1970s and 1980s, turning to matters of sexual expression was a result of frustration with feminism's apparent failure to achieve success through political channels: in the United States, the Equal Rights Amendment (ERA) had failed, and abortion rights came under attack during the Reagan administration.

Scholar Elaine Jeffreys observes that the 'anti-prostitute' position gained increased critical purchase in China during the establishment of the international movement for prostitutes in 1985, demanding recognition of prostitutes' rights as an emancipation and labor issue rather than of criminality, immorality or disease.

By the 2000s, the positive-sex position had driven various international human rights NGOs to actively pressure the Chinese government to abandon its official policy of banning prostitution in post-reform China and recognize voluntary prostitution as legitimate work.

== Related major political issues ==
=== Pornography ===
The issue of pornography was perhaps the first issue to unite sex-positive feminists, though current sex-positive views on the subject are wide-ranging and complex. During the 1980s, Andrea Dworkin and Catharine MacKinnon, as well as activists inspired by their writings, worked in favor of anti-pornography ordinances in a number of U.S. cities, as well as in Canada. The first such ordinance was passed by the city council in Minneapolis in 1983. MacKinnon and Dworkin took the tactic of framing pornography as a civil rights issue, arguing that showing pornography constituted sex discrimination against women. The sex-positive movement response to this argument was that legislation against pornography violates women's right to free speech. Soon after, a coalition of anti-porn feminists and right-wing groups succeeded in passing a similar ordinance in Indianapolis. This ordinance was later declared unconstitutional by a Federal court in American Booksellers v. Hudnut.

Rubin writes that anti-pornography feminists exaggerate the dangers of pornography by showing the most shocking pornographic images (such as those associated with sadomasochism) out of context, in a way that implies that the women depicted are actually being raped, rather than emphasizing that these scenes depict fantasies and use actors who have consented to be shown in such a way. Sex-positive feminists argue that access to pornography is as important to women as to men and that there is nothing inherently degrading to women about pornography. However, anti-pornography feminists disagree, often arguing that the very depiction of such acts leads to the actual acts being encouraged and committed.

Feminist curators such as Jasmin Hagendorfer organize feminist and queer porn film festivals (e.g. PFFV in Vienna).

=== Prostitution and sex workers ===
Some sex-positive feminists believe that women and men can have positive experiences as sex workers and that where it is illegal, prostitution should be decriminalized. They argue that prostitution is not necessarily bad for women if prostitutes are treated with respect and if the professions within sex work are destigmatized.

Sex workers are adults who receive money (or other goods) in exchange for consensual sexual services. In the United States, sex work is legal. The sex workers' rights movement started in the 1970s, and one of the founding groups was COYOTE. The goal of the sex workers activist is to fight for workers by having a better work environment/ conditions, reducing negative fed back, and stopping prohibition.

Carol Leigh is an American woman who is an artist, filmmaker, and sex worker rights activist. Carol Leigh was the first woman to use the term "sex worker". She wanted to educate others about the understanding of sex workers as well as the rights they should have. In an interview, she stated how she sees her own sex work and the sex work of others as having the possibility to serve a higher, spiritual function in society.

=== BDSM ===
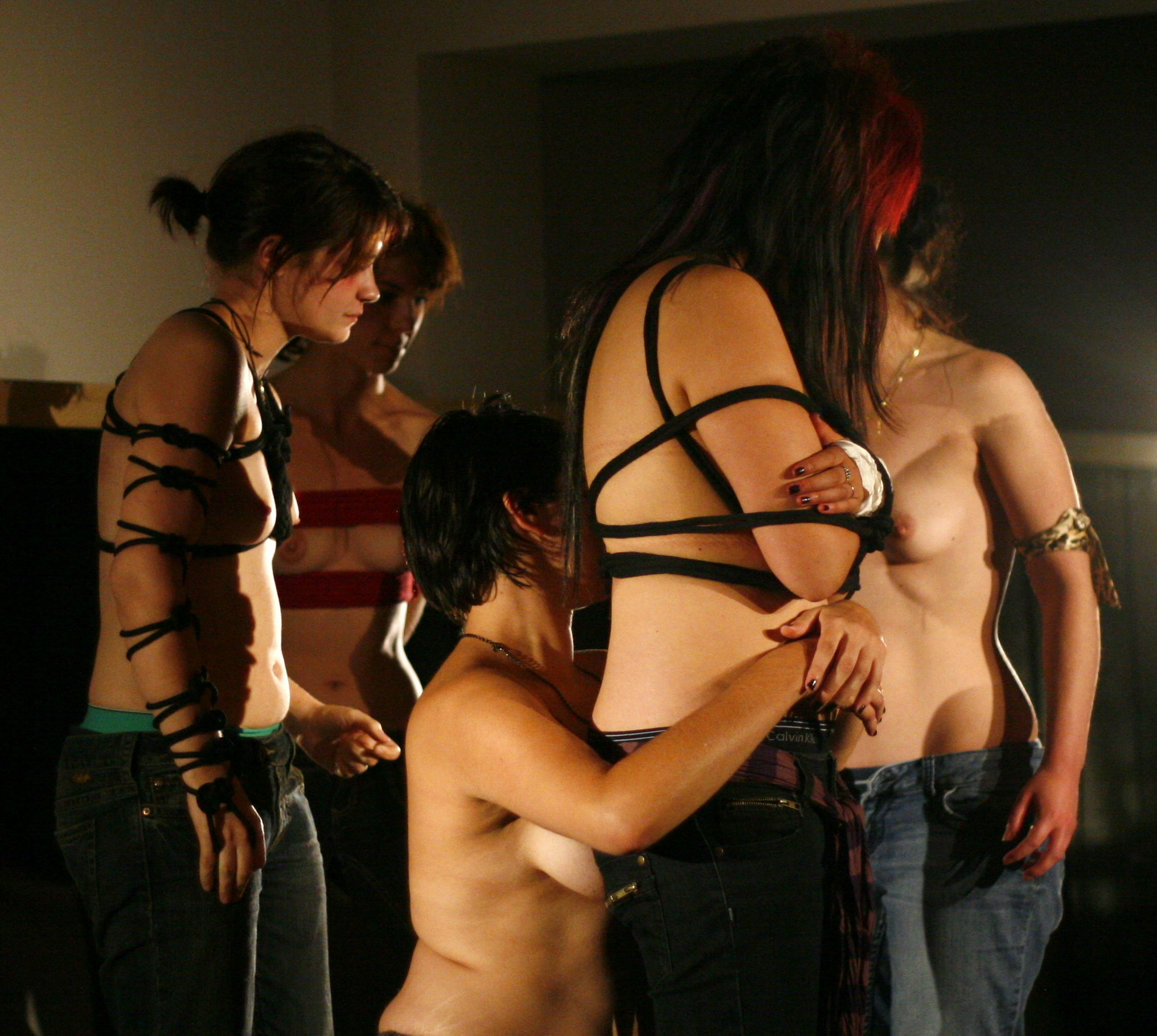
Women acting as bondage riggers for other women

Sadomasochism (BDSM) has been criticized by anti porn feminists for eroticizing power and violence and for reinforcing misogyny (Rubin, 1984). They argue that women who choose to engage in BDSM are making a choice that is ultimately bad for women. Sex-positive feminists argue that consensual BDSM activities are enjoyed by many women and validate these women's sexual inclinations. They argue that feminists should not attack other women's sexual desires as being "anti-feminist" or internalizing oppression and that there is no connection between consensual sexually kinky activities and sex crimes.

While some anti-porn feminists suggest connections between consensual BDSM scenes and rape and sexual assault, sex-positive feminists find this to be insulting to women. It is often mentioned that in BDSM, roles are not fixed to gender, but personal preferences. Furthermore, many argue that playing with power (such as rape scenes) through BDSM is a way of challenging and subverting that power, rather than reifying it.

While the negativities about BDSM are discussed a lot, sex-positive feminists are focusing on safety in the BDSM community. Consent is the most important rule when it comes to BDSM.

Cara Dunkley and Lori Brotto discuss the importance of consent in their journal:

Consent represents an ongoing interactive and dynamic process that entails several precautionary measures, including negotiations of play, open communication of desires and boundaries, mutually defining terms, the notion of responsibility and transparency, and ensuring protection from harm through competence and skill.

Critics discuss that communication with sexual partners is very important.

=== Sexual orientation ===
McElroy argues that many feminists have been afraid of being associated with homosexuality. Betty Friedan, one of the founders of second-wave feminism, warned against lesbianism and called it "the lavender menace" (a view she later renounced). Sex-positive feminists believe that accepting the validity of all sexual orientations is necessary in order to allow women full sexual freedom. Rather than distancing themselves from homosexuality and bisexuality because they fear it will hurt mainstream acceptance of feminism, sex-positive feminists believe that women's liberation cannot be achieved without also promoting acceptance of homosexuality and bisexuality.

=== Gender identity ===
Some trans exclusionary radical feminists, such as Germaine Greer, have criticized transgender women (male-to-female) as men attempting to appropriate female identity while retaining male privilege, and transgender men (female-to-male) as women who reject solidarity with their gender. One of the main exponents of this point of view is Janice Raymond. In The Whole Woman, Greer went so far as to explicitly compare transgender women to rapists for forcing themselves into women's spaces.

Many transgender people see gender identity as an innate part of a person. Some feminists also criticize this belief, arguing instead that gender roles are societal constructs, and are not related to any natural factor. Sex-positive feminists support the right of all individuals to determine their own gender and promote gender fluidity as one means for achieving gender equality. Patrick Califia has written extensively about issues surrounding feminism and transgender issues, especially in Sex Changes: Transgender Politics.

== Debates ==
Like feminism itself, sex-positive feminism is difficult to define, and few within the movement (particularly the academic arm of the movement) agree on any one ideology or policy agenda.

An example of how feminists may disagree on whether a particular cultural work exemplifies sex-positivity is Betty Dodson's critique of Eve Ensler's The Vagina Monologues. Dodson argues that the play promotes a negative view of sexuality, emphasizing sexual violence against women rather than the redemptive value of female sexuality. Many other sex-positive feminists have embraced Ensler's work for its encouragement of openness about women's bodies and sexuality.

=== Statutory rape laws ===
There is debate among sex-positive feminists about whether statutory rape laws are a form of sexism. As illustrated by the controversy over "The Little Coochie Snorcher that Could" from the Vagina Monologues, some sex-positive feminists do not consider all consensual activity between young adolescents and older people as inherently harmful. There has been debate among feminists about whether statutory rape laws benefit or harm teenage girls and about whether the gender of participants should influence the law's treatment of sexual encounters. Some sex-positive feminists argue that statutory rape laws were made with non-gender neutral intentions and are presently enforced as such, with the assumption that teenage girls are naive, nonsexual, and in need of protection.

Sex-positive feminists with this view believe that "teen girls and boys are equally capable of making informed choices in regard to their sexuality" and that statutory rape laws are actually meant to protect "good girls" from sex. Other feminists are opposed or ambivalent about strengthening statutory rape statutes because these preclude young women from entering consensual sexual relationships, even if competent to consent.

These feminists view statutory rape laws as more controlling than protective – and of course part of the law's historic role was protecting the female's chastity as valuable property. One writer also noted that, at that time, in some states, the previous sexual experience of a teenager could be used as a defense by one accused of statutory rape. She argued that this showed that the laws were intended to protect chastity rather than consent.

== Critiques ==
Works that critique sex-positive feminism includes those of Germaine Greer and the essays by Dorchen Leidholdt. According to Ann Ferguson, sex-positive feminists' only restriction on sexual activity should be the requirement of consent, yet she argues that sex-positive feminism has provided inadequate definitions of consent. Sex-positive feminism has also been criticized for focusing on young women, but ignoring middle-aged and elderly women who are unable or unwilling to direct most of their energy into sexuality.

In her 2005 book Female Chauvinist Pigs, Ariel Levy does not oppose sex-positive feminism per se, though sees a popularized form of sex-positivity as constituting a kind of "raunch culture" in which women internalize objectifying male views of themselves and other women. Levy believes it is a mistake to see this as empowering and further holds that women should develop their own forms of sexual expression. The response by sex-positive feminists to Levy's book has been mixed; Susie Bright viewed the book quite favorably, stating that much of what can be seen as "raunch culture" represents a bastardization of the work of earlier sex-positive feminists such as herself. Rachel Kramer Bussel, however, sees Levy as largely ignoring much of the female-empowered sexual expression of the last 20 years, or misinterpreting it as internalization of male fantasy.

== More to review and/or consider ==
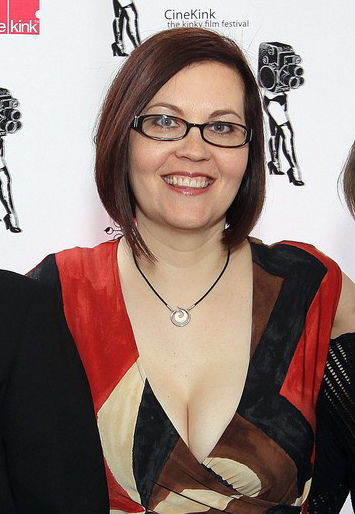
Tristan Taormino, a sex positive feminist

Authors and activists who have written important works about sex-positive feminism, and/or contributed to educating the public about it, include Kathy Acker, Megan Andelloux, Susie Bright, Rachel Kramer Bussel, Diana Cage, Avedon Carol, Patrick Califia, Betty Dodson, Nancy Friday, Jane Gallop, Nina Hartley, Josephine Ho, Amber L. Hollibaugh, Brenda Howard, Laura Kipnis, Wendy McElroy, Inga Muscio, Joan Nestle, Erika Lust, Carol Queen, Candida Royalle, Gayle Rubin, Annie Sprinkle, Tristan Taormino and Ellen Willis. Several of these have written from the perspective of feminist women working in the sex industry.

Information on formal organizations that endorse sex-positive feminism seems lacking but one major outpost of sex-positive feminism is the former cooperative business Good Vibrations founded by Joani Blank in 1977 in order to sell sex toys and publications about sex in an environment welcoming to women. Blank also founded Down There Press which has published various educational publications inspired by sex-positivity. There are a number of other sex-positive feminist businesses who thrive on a combination of sex toy sales and distribution of educational materials. Good For Her, a woman-owned sex-toy shop in Toronto, Ontario, holds an annual Feminist Porn Awards.

Nonprofit groups supporting sex-positive feminism include the currently defunct Feminist Anti-Censorship Task Force associated with Carole Vance and Ann Snitow, Feminists for Free Expression, founded by Marcia Pally, and Feminists Against Censorship associated with anti-censorship and civil liberties campaigner Avedon Carol.

Feminist pornography is a small but growing segment of the pornography industry. A Feminist Porn Award was established in 2006. The equivalent in Europe is the PorYes award for feminist porn, established in 2009. The magazine On Our Backs was founded in 1986 to promote a more positive attitude towards erotica within the community of lesbian and bisexual women. It flourished until 1994, struggled with financial problems and changing ownership and the final edition was published in 2006.

== See also ==
- Female promiscuity
- Femalia
- Free love
- Go Topless Day
- Individualist feminism
- Porn for women
- Women's erotica
- Feminist view on Prostitution

=== Sex-positive literature ===
- Girl Heroes
- The Ethical Slut
