= Society of Janus =

American BDSM organization

- Society of Janus logo

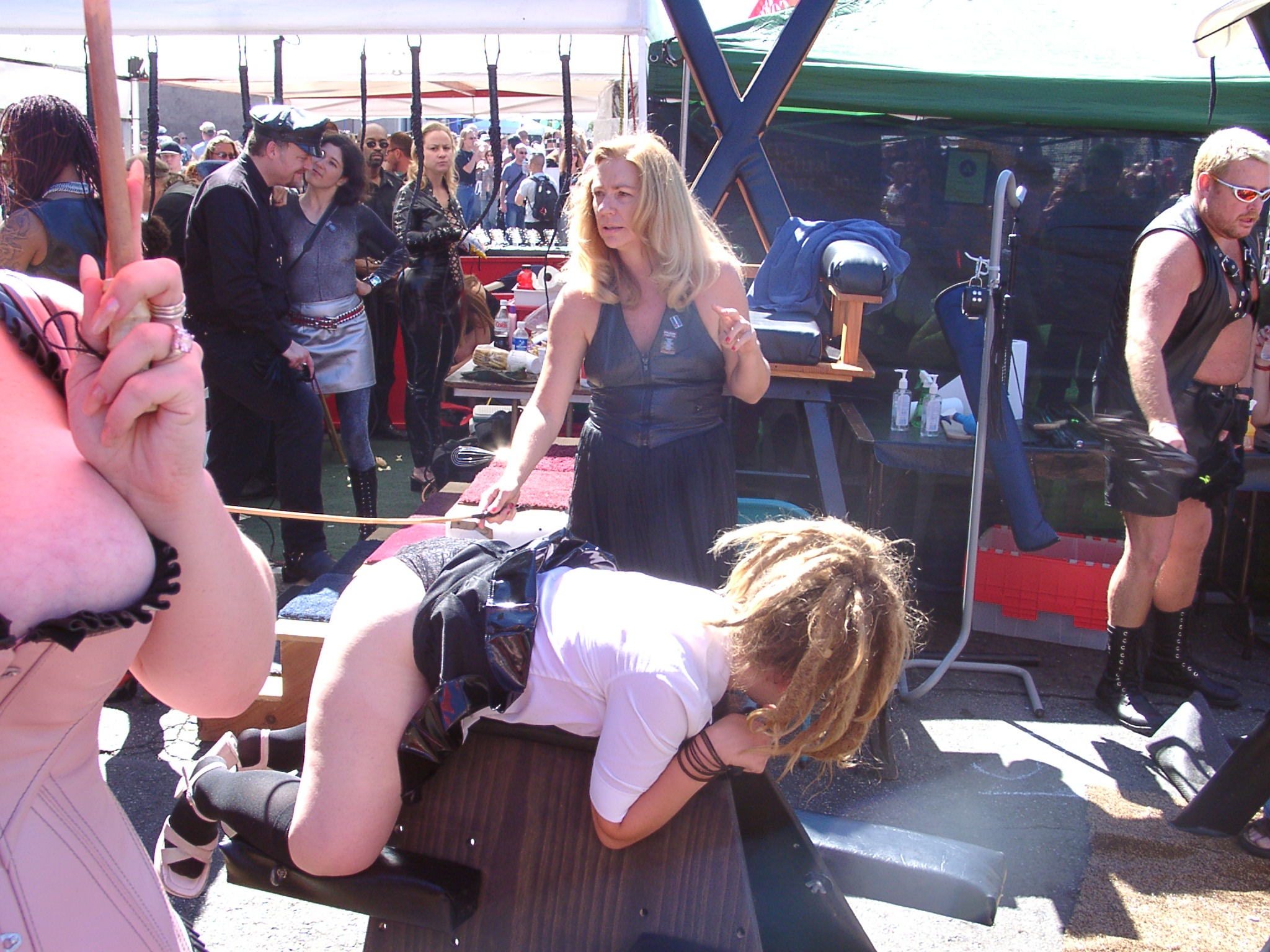
- Society of Janus booth at Folsom Street Fair, 2004
- Formation: August 1974; 51 years ago
- Founder: Cynthia Slater, Larry Olsen
- Founded at: San Francisco, California
- Website: soj.org

The Society of Janus is the second BDSM organization founded in the United States (after The Eulenspiegel Society) and is a San Francisco, California-based BDSM education and support group.

The Society of Janus is nonprofit, volunteer run and is devoted to the art of safe, consensual and non-exploitative adult power exchange. They publish a monthly digital newsletter called Yellow.

== History ==
The Society of Janus was founded in August 1974 by Cynthia Slater and Larry Olsen. According to the Leather Hall of Fame biography of Slater, she said of the Society of Janus:

"There were three basic reasons why we chose Janus. First of all, Janus has two faces, which we interpreted as the duality of SM (one's dominant and submissive sides). Second, he's the Roman god of portals, and more importantly, of beginnings and endings. To us, it represents the beginning of one's acceptance of self, the beginning of freedom from guilt, and the eventual ending of self-loathing and fear over one's SM desires. And third, Janus is the Roman god of war—the war we fight against stereotypes commonly held against us."

— Cynthia Slater

A group called Cardea, a women's discussion group within the Society of Janus, existed from 1977 to 1978 before discontinuing. A core of lesbian members of Cardea, including Pat Califia, who identified as a lesbian at the time, Gayle Rubin, and sixteen others, were inspired to start Samois on June 13, 1978, as an exclusively lesbian BDSM group. Samois was a lesbian-feminist BDSM organization based in San Francisco that existed from 1978 to 1983, and was the first lesbian BDSM group in the United States.

The Society of Janus was one of the founding coalition partners of the National Coalition for Sexual Freedom, which was founded in 1997.

In 2004, the Society of Janus Hall of Fame was established. Some of its inductees are: Guy Baldwin, Patrick Califia, Dossie Easton, Janet Hardy, Viola Johnson, Midori, Fakir Musafar, Charles Moser, Gayle Rubin, Cynthia Slater, Jim Ward, Mollena Williams-Haas, and Jay Wiseman.

In 2014, the Society of Janus held their 40th Anniversary Dinner, Hall of Fame Induction Ceremony & Play Party, which was awarded "Best Organization Anniversary Event" at The SF Leather Community Awards for that year.

In 2017, an art installation known as the San Francisco South of Market Leather History Alley was installed; in it, Society of Janus co-founder Cynthia Slater is honored with a metal boot-print displaying her name and a short statement about her.

In 2018, the Society of Janus was inducted into the Leather Hall of Fame.

The records of the Society of Janus are housed at the Leather Archives & Museum in Chicago.

== See also ==
- Leather Pride flag
- National Coalition for Sexual Freedom
