= Pat Bond (Eulenspiegel Society) =

American BDSM pioneer (1926–2021)

Pat Bond, born Walter Allen Campbell (May 24, 1926 – February 13, 2021) was an American BDSM pioneer, known for cofounding The Eulenspiegel Society, the first BDSM organization in the United States. In 1971, as a 44-year-old working as a music teacher, Bond and Fran Nowve (who used the name Terry Kolb) founded The Eulenspiegel Society in New York City as an informal association and support group for masochists; sadists joined shortly after in that same year.

Bond had placed an ad in Screw magazine in December 1970, reading:

"Masochist? Happy? Is it curable? Does psychiatry help? Is a satisfactory life-style possible? There’s women’s lib, black lib, gay lib, etc. Isn’t it time we put something together?"

The ad also ran in the East Village Other. Fran Nowve, using the name Terry Kolb, was the first person to answer the ad. Bond and Nowve began The Eulenspiegel Society in 1971, and Nowve came up with its name.

In 1992, Bond received the Steve Maidhof Award for National or International Work from the National Leather Association International.

Together with Nowve, Bond was inducted into the Leather Hall of Fame in 2015.

He died on February 13, 2021, at the age of 94.
