= Barbara Nitke =

American photographer

Barbara Nitke (born 1950) is an American art photographer who specializes in the subject of human sexual relations. She has worked extensively in the porn and BDSM communities.

Nitke was born in Lynchburg, Virginia in 1950 and grew up in Virginia and Alaska. She is currently a fashion/art photographer, and is on the faculty of the School of Visual Arts in New York.

== Nitke and the porn business ==
Hailed by The Village Voice for her quest "to find humanity in marginal sex", Nitke has gained worldwide attention for her photographs chronicling relationships between consenting adults engaged in sadomasochistic activities.

Her documentation of sexuality began in 1982 on the sets of pornographic films, towards the end of the Golden Age of Porn. She worked in the industry for twelve years as a set photographer on hundreds of adult films. Her photographs from this period reveal the combination of boredom, surrealism, vulnerability and dissociation inherent in the X-rated world. During that time she also became active as a photographer on mainstream television and movie sets, work which she continues today.

In 1991, after the hardcore porn business moved to Los Angeles, she began shooting on the New York sets of fetish and SM movies, which had become the fastest growing segment of the adult film industry.

Three years later she attended her first meeting of The Eulenspiegel Society, the oldest SM support and educational group in the country, to see a presentation by underground photographer Charles Gatewood. The couples she met in the SM scene fascinated her, and she began photographing them in 1994. They became the focus of her book, Kiss of Fire: A Romantic View of Sadomasochism (2003). It was among the first mainstream publications to examine the subject of BDSM.

Nitke ran a successful Kickstarter campaign to produce her second book, Barbara Nitke: American Ecstasy (2012), a memoir in pictures and words of her hardcore porn days.

== Nitke v. Gonzales ==
In 2001, Nitke filed a lawsuit, along with co-plaintiff the National Coalition for Sexual Freedom, challenging the constitutionality of the Communications Decency Act, a federal statute prohibiting the publication of obscenity on the Internet. The case was called Nitke v. Ashcroft, then later changed to Nitke v. Gonzales.

Nitke and the NCSF argued that while the Supreme Court's decision in Miller v. California defines obscenity according to community standards, the Internet does not permit publishers to restrict the dissemination of their speech based on geography. Therefore, the plaintiffs claimed, a person posting sexually explicit material on the Internet could be found criminally liable according to the standards of the most restrictive community in the country. This, Nitke said, would chill her freedom of speech and therefore violate her First Amendment rights.

A three-judge panel of the United States District Court for the Southern District of New York conducted a trial, and in 2005 found that Nitke and the NCSF had presented insufficient evidence that the variation in community standards was substantial enough to chill the plaintiffs' speech. On March 20, 2006, the Supreme Court affirmed that ruling without opinion.

== Awards ==
In 2001 she (and Kent Arnold and Daddy Nick Golden) received a President's Award as part of the Pantheon of Leather Awards.

== Books ==
- Kiss of Fire: A Romantic View of Sadomasochism. New York, NY: Pierrot, 2003. ISBN 978-3-933257-94-9
- Barbara Nitke: American Ecstasy. New York, NY: Pierrot, 2012. ISBN 978-0-615614-36-6

== Exhibitions ==
- 2014: American Ecstasy, One Eyed Jacks, Brighton, England.

== See also ==
- Free speech
- Telecommunications Act of 1996
- Fetish photographer
- Erotic art
