= Catacombs (sex club) =

Gay and lesbian fisting club in San Francisco, California

Coordinates: 37.7568523°N 122.4244217°W

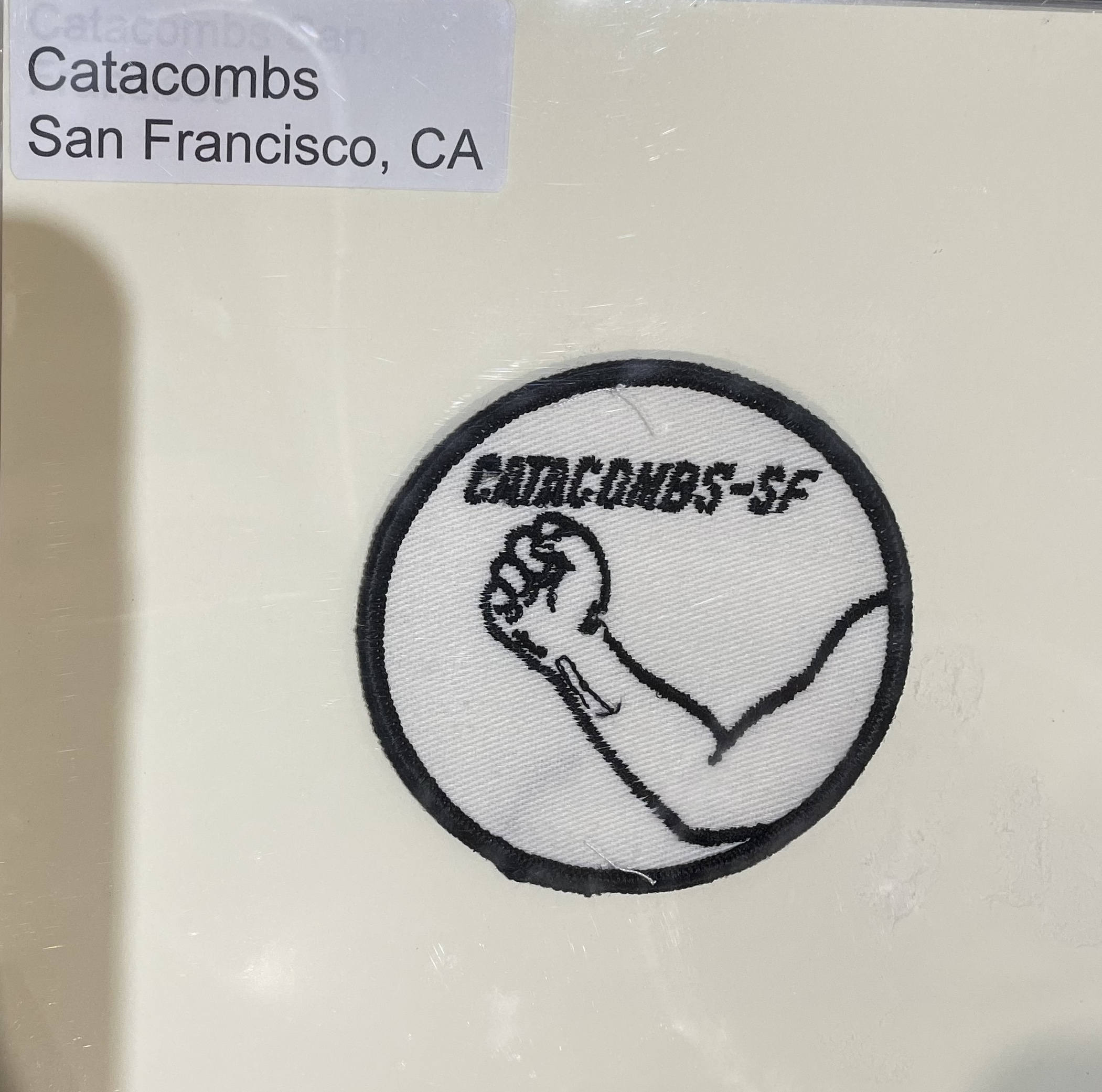
- Catacombs patch (Leather Archives & Museum collection)

- Interactive map of the Catacombs area

General information
- Type: Sex Club
- Location: SoMa, San Francisco, California
- Opened: 1975
- Relocated: 1982
- Closed: 1984
- Owner: Steve McEachern

Design and construction
- Known for: Fisting

The Catacombs was a gay and lesbian S/M leather fisting club which operated from 1975 to 1981 in the Mission District/Liberty Hill Historic District and from 1982 to 1984 in the South of Market area of San Francisco. It was the most famous fisting club in the world. The founder and owner was Steve McEachern. The location was semi-secret and admission was by referral only. It was originally a gay men's club, but Cynthia Slater persuaded the management to open up to lesbians. Among the patrons was Patrick Califia, known then as Pat Califia. The Catacombs has been exhaustively described by sexual anthropologist Gayle Rubin, who calls it "exemplary" in its attempts to deal with the AIDS crisis which would eventually lead to its closure. Patrick Moore devotes a chapter to it in his Beyond Shame: Reclaiming the Abandoned History of Radical Gay Sexuality. Sex educator Carol Queen called it "the place to be seen and to play at during the 1980s."

The San Francisco South of Market Leather History Alley, opened in 2017, honors leather culture and community members including McEachern.
