= Charles Gatewood =

American photographer and videographer (1942–2016)

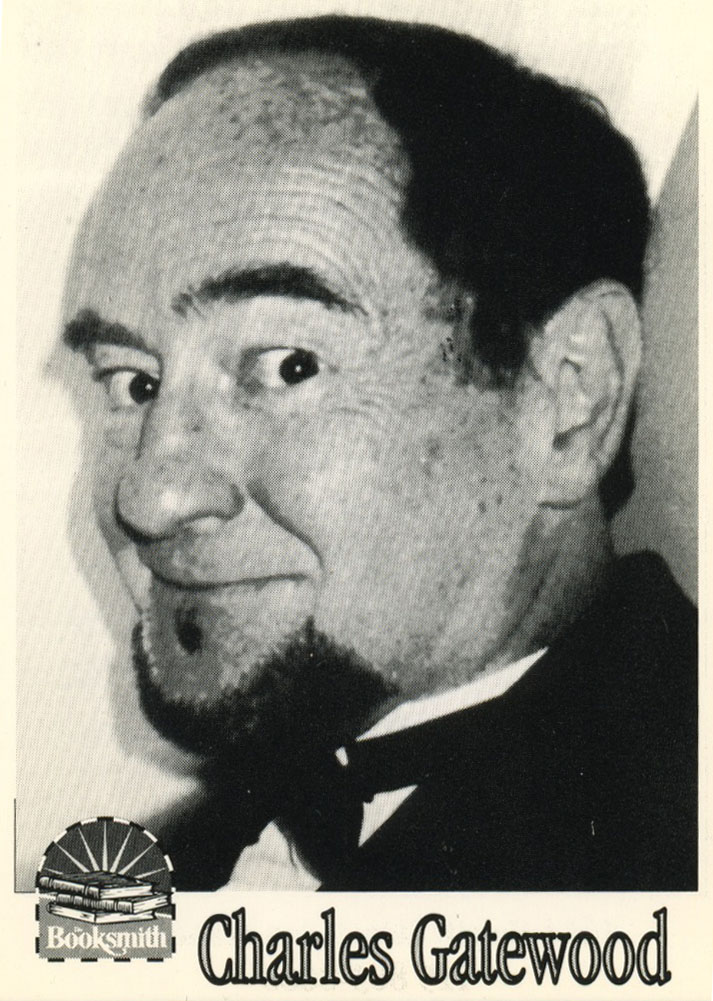
- Born: Charles Robert Gatewood; November 8, 1942; Elgin, Illinois, US
- Died: April 28, 2016 (aged 73); San Francisco, California, U.S.A.

Charles Robert Gatewood (November 8, 1942 – April 28, 2016) was an American photographer, writer, videographer, artist and educator, who lived and worked in San Francisco, California.

== Biography ==
=== Early years ===
Gatewood was born November 8, 1942, in Elgin, Illinois. From ages one to three Gatewood lived with his father, John Jay Gatewood (a traveling salesman) and his mother, Clarene Hall Gatewood (a housewife) near Dallas, Texas. In 1945 the family moved to Rolla, Missouri, where Gatewood's father found work as a traveling salesman. In 1951, the Gatewood family moved to Springfield, Missouri, where Charles attended J.P Study Jr. High and Parkview High School.

=== Education ===
From 1960 to 1964, Gatewood attended the University of Missouri, majoring in Anthropology and taking a minor in art history. In 1964, as he was finishing his first year of graduate work, Gatewood met George W. Gardner, a gifted student photographer. Gatewood credited Gardner's work and a Museum of Modern Art photography book, "The Family of Man" as influences that helped him choose a career in photography.

=== European studies ===
From 1964 to 1966, Gatewood lived and worked in Stockholm, Sweden. He enrolled at the Stockholm University to study sociology and apprenticed with a group of documentary photographers. In 1965, after exploring Europe, Gatewood returned to Sweden and found work as a darkroom technician for AB Text & Bilder, a Stockholm news agency. At night, Gatewood took advantage of his press pass and the agency's sophisticated equipment to photograph jazz concerts and happenings.

On April 29, 1966, Gatewood photographed the press conference and concert of musician Bob Dylan. One photograph, "Dylan With Sunglasses and Cigarette," was syndicated and received worldwide publication. It was Gatewood's first sale, his first published picture. "Taking the Bob Dylan photo gave me faith I could actually be a professional photographer," said Gatewood.

Other celebrity photos taken by Gatewood during this time include pictures of Martin Luther King Jr., Ornette Coleman, Sonny Rollins, Joan Baez, Duke Ellington and Ella Fitzgerald.

=== The Manhattan years ===
In June, 1966, Gatewood returned to the United States, rented an apartment on Manhattan's Lower East Side, and found work as second assistant at Jaffe-Smith photography studio in Greenwich Village. Ten months later, after learning studio photography techniques and advanced darkroom skills, Gatewood quit Jaffee-Smith and began his career as a freelance photographer.

Rents were cheap, and the photography market was booming. Gatewood rented part of a photography studio at 8 East 12th Street, and sold photos to textbooks, magazines, poster companies, and other editorial markets. From 1970 to 1974 Gatewood worked as staff photographer for the Manhattan Tribune. He also photographed on assignment for The New York Times, Rolling Stone, Harper's, Business Week, Time and other magazines.

In 1972 and 1976, Gatewood was awarded CAPS fellowships by the New York State Arts Council. In 1975, Sidetripping, Gatewood's first photography book, was published, with text by William S. Burroughs. The book was widely praised. A.D. Coleman, writing in The New York Times, said, "Gatewood's work is freakish, earthy, blunt, erotic--most of all, terribly and beautifully alive."

Gatewood's work during this period included shots of Mardi Gras in New Orleans (12 times), Gay Pride celebrations and Manhattan's downtown music and art scene. The notables he photographed in this time span include Andy Warhol, Allen Ginsberg, Sly Stone, Luis Buñuel, Bernardo Bertolucci, Ron Wood, Carlos Santana, Abbie Hoffman, Etta James, Gil Evans and Nelson Rockefeller.

=== The Woodstock years ===
From 1978 to 1987, Gatewood lived near Woodstock, New York, and worked in Manhattan and elsewhere. His photos from this period include one of social protests, rock festivals, Mardi Gras in New Orleans, body modification, outlaw bikers, and nature. The celebrities he captured images of include Larry Clark, Annie Sprinkle, Michael O'Donoghue, Ira Cohen and Quentin Crisp.

In 1984 the New York State Arts Council awarded Gatewood a grant to publish Wall Street photographs, and in 1985 the book Wall Street was awarded the Leica Medal of Excellence for Outstanding Humanistic Photojournalism. In 1985, a feature film about Gatewood, titled "Dances Sacred and Profane", premiered at the Antwerp Film Festival and was screened in U.S. theaters to critical acclaim.

=== San Francisco ===
From 1987, Gatewood lived and worked in San Francisco, California. From 1998 to 2010, he was a photographer for Skin and Ink magazine. During this period, Gatewood produced over thirty documentary videos about body modification, fetish fashion and other alternative interests. His San Francisco period subjects include the Folsom Street Fair (15 times), Dadafest (4 times) and Burning Man (4 times). Gatewood also photographed a number of nude studies during this period.

Gatewood's documentation of alternative culture in San Francisco is unmatched. People he photographed include Lawrence Ferlinghetti, Herb Gold, Charles Henri Ford, Carol Queen, Ron Turner and Ruth Bernard.

In 1994 Barbara Nitke attended her first meeting of The Eulenspiegel Society, the oldest SM support and educational group in the country, to see a presentation by Gatewood. The couples she met in the SM scene fascinated her, and she began photographing them in 1994. They became the focus of her book, Kiss of Fire: A Romantic View of Sadomasochism (2003). It was among the first mainstream publications to examine the subject of BDSM.

Gatewood's photo books from this period include A Complete Unknown, Burroughs 23, Badlands, True Blood, The Body and Beyond and Primitives. In 1986 Pocket Books published his novel Hellfire.

=== Death ===
Gatewood died in San Francisco, California on April 28, 2016, after sustaining serious injuries in a fall from his balcony three weeks earlier, in an apparent suicide attempt. He left several notes behind. He was 73.

== Books published ==
- Discovery in Song, New York, Paulist Press, 1969
- Sidetripping with William S. Burroughs, New York, Strawberry Hill Books, 1975, Last Gasp, 2002
- People in Focus, Garden City, New York, Amphoto, 1977
- X-1000 with Spider Webb and Marco Vassi, Woodstock, N.Y., R.Mutt Press, 1977
- Pushing Ink: The Fine Art of Tattooing with Spider Webb and Marco Vassi, New York, Simon and Schuster, 1979
- How to Take Great Pictures with Your Simple Camera, New York, Doubleday, 1982
- Wall Street, Woodstock, New York, R. Mutt Press, 1984
- Hellfire, New York, Pocket Books, 1987
- Primitives, Woodstock, New York, R. Mutt Press, 1992, Last Gasp, 2002
- Charles Gatewood Photographs, San Francisco, Flash Publications, 1993
- Badlands, Frankfurt, Goliath Books, 1999
- A Complete Unknown, San Francisco, DanaDanaDana Editions, 2009
- Burroughs 23, San Francisco, DanaDanaDana Editions, 2011

== Solo exhibitions ==
- 1968 Lewison Gallery, City College, New York
- 1972 Light Gallery, New York
- 1975 Neikrug Gallery, New York
- 1975 Brummels Gallery, Melbourne, Australia
- 1976 Australian Center for Photography, Sydney
- 1977 University of West Virginia, Morgantown
- 1977 Levitan Gallery, New York City, "X-1000"
- 1978 Steiglitz Gallery, New York City, "Wall Street"
- 1978 Light Works, Syracuse University, "Forbidden
- 1994 Rita Dean Gallery, San Diego, CA
- 1978 Project Arts Center, Cambridge, MA "Forbidden Photographs"
- 1978 Contrejour Gallery, Paris
- 1978 Catskill Center for Photography, Woodstock, NY
- 1978 Metropolitan State College, Denver, CO
- 1978 Colorado Center for Photographic Studies, University of Colorado at Boulder
- 1979 Gallery Vior, Toulouse, France
- 1981 Robert Samuel Gallery, New York City
- 1984 Rhode Island School of Design, Providence, RI
- 1986 Drew University, Madison, NJ
- 1988 Level Three Gallery, Philadelphia, PA
- 1988 Bobo Gallery, San Francisco, CA
- 1989 Neikrug Gallery, New York
- 1992 Morphos Gallery, San Francisco
- 1993 Photographic Image Gallery Portland, OR
- 1994 Clayton Gallery, New York, "Charles Gatewood Photographs”
- 1994 Magic Theater, San Francisco, CA
- 1994,96 Morphos Gallery, San Francisco
- 1995 Dark's Art Parlour, Santa Ana, CA
- 1995 Clayton Gallery, New York
- 1995 Anon Salon, San Francisco, CA
- 1995 Komm Ausstellungswerkstatt, Nuremberg, Germany
- 1995 University of Tübingen, Tugingen, Germany
- 1996 Clayton Gallery, NYC
- 1997 Williamsburg Art and Historical Center, Brooklyn, NY "The Body and Beyond"
- 1998 Merry Karnowsky Gallery, LA, CA
- 1999 Sacred Body Art Gallery, NYC
- 2001 Ehrngren Gallery, Stockholm
- 2002 Art@Large, NYC
- 2003 Sacred Tattoo Gallery, NYC
- 2003 Das Gelbe Haus, Zurich
- 2003 Clayton Gallery, NYC
- 2003 Good Vibrations Gallery, San Francisco
- 2003 Stormy Leather Gallery, San Francisco
- 2005 Art @ Large, NYC
- 2006 Rags to Riches, The Lola Gallery (now McGovern Design House), San Francisco
- 2006 Center for Sex and Culture, San Francisco
- 2007, 2009, 2011 Robert Tat gallery, San Francisco
- 2008 Gallery 32, London England
- 2016 Ladybug House, San Francisco

== The Charles Gatewood Archive ==
The Charles Gatewood photograph archive and related material at The Bancroft Library, University of California, Berkeley contains "...250,000 images, including all his contact sheets and their corresponding negatives; hundreds of stock images..." The collection also includes manuscript notes, personal diaries and a significant portion of Gatewood's personal library.
