= Rachel Kramer Bussel =

American writer

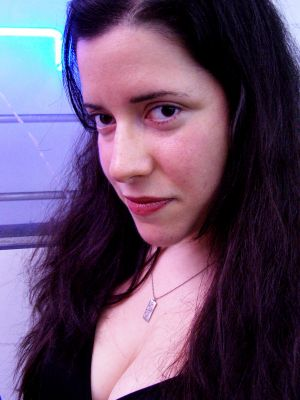
- Occupations: Author, columnist, editor & sex educator
- Website: www.rachelkramerbussel.com

Rachel Kramer Bussel is an American author, columnist, and editor, specializing in erotica. She previously studied at the New York University School of Law.

== Career ==
Bussel has been a Senior Editor at Penthouse Variations, a Contributing Editor to Penthouse, and a blogger for The Huffington Post. In addition, she is a rotating interviewer for the Gothamist and a columnist for SexIs Magazine. She has written for the Village Voice.

From 2005 to 2010, she was the curator for a monthly erotic reading series, In the Flesh, in New York City.

== Personal life ==
Bussel is bisexual, saying in 2006, "I think ideally I'd like to have a male lover and a female lover, either a triad situation or one on one."

Bussel has been a resident of Teaneck, New Jersey.

== Awards ==
Bussel received a 2009 Independent Publisher Book Award for the Tasting Him and Tasting Her anthologies. She received the National Leather Association International's Samois Anthology Award for 2012 for Surrender: Erotic Tales of Female Pleasure and Submission, for 2016 for Dirty Dates: Erotic Fantasies For Couples, and for 2019 for The Big Book Of Submission Volume 2.

== Bibliography ==
=== As author ===
- The Lesbian Sex Book: A Guide for Women Who Love Women with Wendy Caster (2003)
- The Art of the Erotic Love Letter (2011)
- Everything But (2011)

=== As editor ===
- Naughty Spanking Stories from A to Z (2004)
- Up All Night: Adventures in Lesbian Sex with Stacy Bias (2004)
- First-timers: True Stories of Lesbian Awakening (2006)
- Caught Looking: Erotic Tales of Voyeurs and Exhibitionists (2006)
- Secret Slaves: Erotic Stories of Bondage with Christopher Pierce (2006)
- Ultimate Undies: Erotic Stories About Underwear and Lingerie with Christopher Pierce (2006)
- Sexiest Soles: Erotic Stories About Feet And Shoes with Christopher Pierce (2006)
- Second Skin: Erotic Stories About Leather and Latex with Christopher Pierce (2006)
- Glamour Girls: Femme/Femme Erotica (2006)
- Naughty Spanking Stories from A to Z, Volume 2(2006)
- Crossdressing: Erotic Stories (2007)
- Hide and Seek: Erotic Stories with Alison Tyler (2007)
- Sex and Candy: Twenty Succulent Stories (2007)
- He's on Top: Erotic Stories of Male Dominance and Female Submission (2007)
- She's on Top: Erotic Stories of Female Dominance and Male Submission (2007)
- Best Sex Writing 2008 (2007)
- Yes, Ma'am: Erotic Stories of Female Dominance (2008)
- Yes, Sir: Erotic Stories of Male Dominance (2008)
- Dirty Girls: Erotica for Women (2008)
- Rubber Sex: Erotic Stories (2008)
- Spanked: Red Cheeked Erotica (2008)
- Tasting Her: Oral Sex Stories (2008)
- Tasting Him: Oral Sex Stories (2008)
- The Lust Chronicles Anthology (2008)
- Bedding Down (2008)
- Best Sex Writing 2009 (2008)
- Love Notes: A Music and Sex Anthology (2009)
- Do Not Disturb: Hotel Sex Stories (2009)
- Mile High Club: Plane Sex Stories (2009)
- Bottoms Up: Spanking Good Stories (2009)
- Peep Show: Erotic Tales of Voyeurs and Exhibitionists (2009)
- Best Sex Writing 2010 (2009)
- Please, Sir: Erotic Stories of Female Submission (2010)
- Please, Ma'am: Erotic Stories of Male Submission (2010)
- Fast Girls: Erotica for Women (2010)
- Orgasmic: Erotica for Women (2010)
- Smooth: Erotic Stories for Women (2010)
- Passion: Erotic Romance for Women (2010)
- Best Bondage Erotica 2011 (2010)
- Surrender: Erotic Tales of Female Pleasure and Submission (2011)
- Gotta Have It: 69 Stories of Sudden Sex (2011)
- Obsessed: Erotic Romance for Women (2011)
- Women in Lust: Erotic Stories (2011)
- Best Bondage Erotica 2012 (2011)
- Best Sex Writing 2012: The State of Today's Sexual Culture (2012)
- Irresistible: Erotic Romance for Couples (2012)
- Curvy Girls: Erotica for Women (2012)
- Going Down: Oral Sex Stories (2012)
- Anything for You: Erotica for Kinky Couples (2012)
- Hungry for More: Romantic Fantasies For Women (2012)
- Cheeky Spanking Stories (2012)
- Instruments of Pleasure: Sex Toy Erotica (2012)
- Best Bondage Erotica 2013 (2012)
- Only You: Erotic Romance for Women (2013)
- Best Sex Writing 2013: The State of Today's Sexual Culture (2013)
- Twice the Pleasure: Bisexual Women's Erotica (2013)
- Serving Him: Sexy Stories of Submission (2013)
- Baby Got Back: Anal Erotica (2013)
- Big Book of Orgasms: 69 Sexy Stories (2013)
- Best Bondage Erotica 2014 (2014)
- Big Book of Submission: 69 Kinky Tales (2014)
- Best Bondage Erotica 2015 (2015)
- Naked Desire: Erotic Romance for Women (2015)
- I Want You Bad: Obsessed Erotic Romance for Women (2015)
- Dirty Dates: Erotic Fantasies for Couples (2015)
- Come Again: Sex Toy Erotica (2015)
- Best Women's Erotica of the Year, Volume 1 (2016)
- Begging For It: Erotic Fantasies for Women (2016)
- Best Women's Erotica of the Year, Volume 2 (2016)
- On Fire: Erotic Romance Stories (2017)
- Best Women's Erotica of the Year, Volume 3 (2017)
- The Big Book of Submission, Volume 2: 69 Kinky Tales (2017)
- Candy Lovers: Sugar Erotica (2018)
- Best Women's Erotica of the Year, Volume 4 (2018)
- Erotic Teasers (2019)
- Best Women's Erotica of the Year, Volume 5 (2019)
- Best Bondage Erotica of the Year, Volume 1 (2020)
- Best Women's Erotica of the Year, Volume 6 (2020)
- Best Bondage Erotica of the Year, Volume 2 (2021)
- Coming Soon: Women's Orgasm Erotica (2021)
- Best Women's Erotica of the Year, Volume 7 (2021)
- Big Book of Orgasms, Volume 2: 69 Sexy Stories (2022)
