= Samois =

American lesbian feminist BDSM organization (1978–1983)

- Formation: 1978
- Founder: Pat Califia, Gayle Rubin, and sixteen others
- Founded at: San Francisco, U.S.
- Dissolved: 1983; 43 years ago

Samois was a lesbian feminist BDSM organization based in San Francisco that existed from 1978 to 1983. It was the first lesbian BDSM group in the United States. It took its name from Samois-sur-Seine, the location of the fictional estate of Anne-Marie, a lesbian dominatrix character in Pauline Réage's erotic novel Story of O, who pierces and brands O. The co-founders were writer Patrick Califia, who identified as a lesbian at the time, Gayle Rubin, and sixteen others.

== Origins ==
The roots of Samois were in a group called Cardea, a women's sub-group within the mixed-gender BDSM group called the Society of Janus. Cardea existed from 1977 to 1978 before discontinuing, but a core of lesbian members, including Califia and Rubin, were inspired to start Samois on June 13, 1978, as an exclusively lesbian BDSM group.

== Criticism ==
Samois was strongly rebuked (and sometimes picketed) by Women Against Violence in Pornography and Media (WAVPM), an early anti-pornography feminist group. WAVPM, like later anti-pornography feminists, was very strongly opposed to sadomasochism, seeing it as ritualized violence against women. Samois members felt strongly that their way of practicing sadomasochism was entirely compatible with feminism, and held that the kind of feminist sexuality advocated by WAVPM was conservative and puritanical. Samois openly confronted WAVPM with their position, and the exchanges between the two groups were among the earliest battles of what later became known as the feminist sex wars, with Samois being among the very earliest advocates of what came to be known as sex-positive feminism.

In the 1982 anthology Against Sadomasochism, American philosopher Judith Butler, credited as "Judy Butler", criticizes Samois in their essay "Lesbian S&M: The Politics of Dis-Illusion." Several other essays in the work also criticize it.

== Publications ==
Samois members, including Califia, Rubin, Carol Truscott, and others, wrote essays, books, poetry, and more aimed at lesbian and feminist communities which defended, explained, and taught BDSM practices.

=== Books ===
==== What Color is Your Handkerchief: A Lesbian SM Sexuality Reader (1979) ====
Samois' first book, published in 1979 and titled What Color is Your Handkerchief: is a 44-page collection of members' previously published essays on BDSM.

==== Coming to Power: Writings and Graphics on Lesbian S/M (1981) ====
Their second book Coming to Power, written and edited by Samois members and published in 1981, is an anthology of poetry, short fiction, and art focusing on themes of sadism and masochism. The anthology was a founding work of the lesbian BDSM movement.

=== Essays ===
"The Leather Menace" (1982) written by Gayle Rubin compared BDSM practitioners to religious heretics for the constant criticism they faced for the BDSM practices by feminists and lesbians as well as larger society.

== Final Years and Legacy ==
Samois split up in 1983 amid personal infighting; however, in 1984, Rubin went on to help form another organization called The Outcasts. The Outcasts lasted until 1997, until they too split due to infighting. A breakaway group called The Exiles is still extant and carries on in the tradition of Samois and The Outcasts. In 2012, The Exiles in San Francisco received the Small Club of the Year award as part of the Pantheon of Leather Awards.

In 1996, Califia and Robin Sweeney published an anthology titled The Second Coming: A Leatherdyke Reader that also contained historical information on The Outcasts, as well as other lesbian BDSM groups such as the Lesbian Sex Mafia and Briar Rose.

In 2007 the National Leather Association International inaugurated awards for excellence in SM/fetish/leather writing. The categories include the Samois award for anthology.

In 2019 Samois was inducted into the Leather Hall of Fame.
