= Lesbian Sex Mafia =

American queer women's group

- Formation: 1981
- Founder: Jo Arnone and Dorothy Allison
- Headquarters: New York City
- Website: https://lesbiansexmafia.org/

The Lesbian Sex Mafia (LSM) is a support and education group for all queer women, as well as nonbinary, genderqueer, and transmasc people interested in BDSM, leather, fetishes, costumes, etc. Founded in 1981 by Jo Arnone and Dorothy Allison, it is located in New York City.

LSM works "to organize for [women's] sexual desire as strongly as we have tried to organize for our sexual defense". The name was deliberately chosen "in the same spirit of humor as the Ladies Sewing Circle and Terrorism Society."

== History ==
LSM organized a "Speakout on Politically Incorrect Sex" rally at the 1982 Barnard Conference on Sexuality. The group was also a subject of a documentary by the German filmmaker Monika Treut, Bondage, the first of four films in the Female Misbehaviour series.

In 1993, Pride Night by LSM, The Eulenspiegel Society, Excelsior MC, GMS/MA, and NLA: Metro New York received the Large Event of the Year award as part of the Pantheon of Leather Awards.

In 1996, LSM co-founder Jo Arnone received the National Leather Association International’s Jan Lyon Award for Regional or Local Work. In 2005, she received the Lifetime Achievement Award as part of the Pantheon of Leather Awards, and in 2010 she received the Mr. Marcus Hernandez Lifetime Achievement Award (Woman) as part of the Pantheon of Leather Awards.

== Membership ==
Membership in LSM is open to queer women, nonbinary, genderqueer, and transmasc people over the age of 18. To become a member, one must fill out an application, pay an annual due, and become an LSM Pledge. Next, the pledge must attend an LSM Orientation/Safety Procedure Meeting. Active members may vote in business meetings, officer elections, officer recall, by-laws revisions and disciplinary proceedings. The organization is led by an elected Board of Officers.

== See also ==
- Dorothy Allison
- Patrick Califia
- V. M. Johnson
- Feminist sex wars
