= Guy Baldwin =

American psychotherapist and author (born 1946)

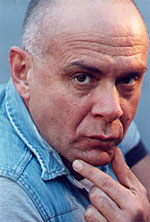

Guy Baldwin (born 1946) is an American psychotherapist, author, and activist. He specializes in issues of particular relevance to the BDSM and leather communities, and is based in Los Angeles. Together with his then-partner, Race Bannon, he started the successful effort to de-classify kink as a psychiatric disorder in the 1980s in Los Angeles, California.

In 1982 Baldwin created a database of professionals who knew about and were not prejudiced against kink and BDSM, called the Kink Aware Professionals list (KAP list). It has been expanded and is now managed by the National Coalition for Sexual Freedom as the Kink And Polyamory Aware Professionals Directory.

== Recognition ==
In 1989, Baldwin held two leather titles: Mr. National Leather Association and International Mr. Leather. He is the first Mr. National Leather Association titleholder to also be International Mr. Leather at the same time.

In 2009, he was awarded the first Guy Baldwin Master/slave Heritage Award from the Master/slave Conference, an award which since then has been given by them almost every year.

In 2012, he was inducted into the Leather Hall of Fame.

== Bibliography ==
Baldwin is a prolific author of both fiction and non-fiction related to BDSM. Baldwin authored a monthly column in Drummer magazine from 1986 to 1993. The column was later compiled in his book Ties that Bind (1993).

=== Books ===
- Guy Baldwin (1993). Joseph W. Bean (ed.). Ties That Bind: The SM/Leather/Fetish Erotic Style: Issues, Commentaries and Advice. Daedalus Publishing Company. ISBN 978-1-881943-09-9.
- Guy Baldwin (1993). The Leather Contest Guide: A Handbook for Promoters, Contestants, Judges and Titleholders. Daedalus Publishing Company. ISBN 1-881943-08-9.
- Guy Baldwin (2002). SlaveCraft: Roadmaps for Erotic Servitude—Principles, Skills and Tools. Daedalus Publishing Company. ISBN 1-881943-14-3.
