= Coming to Power =

1981 anthology of lesbian S/M writings

- Cover of the first edition
- Language: English
- Subject: Sadomasochism
- Publisher: Samois
- Publication date: 1981
- Publication place: United States
- Media type: Print (paperback)
- Pages: 287
- ISBN: 0-932870-28-7

Coming to Power: Writings and Graphics on Lesbian S/M is a 1981 book edited by members of the lesbian feminist S/M organisation Samois. It is an anthology of lesbian S/M writings. It was a founding work of the lesbian BDSM movement.

It was quickly out-of-print and reached a worldwide audience the following year when it was reprinted by Alyson Publications. The book alternates short stories with advice on techniques, a model that has been used by various other BDSM books since then.

A sequel The Second Coming: A Leatherdyke Reader was published in 1996, edited by Pat Califia and Robin Sweeney.

Many of the authors in Coming to Power characterise sadomasochism as the epitome of eroticism.

It is described in Coming on Strong: Gay Politics and Culture as containing lesbian erotica.
