= Gloria Brame =

American sexologist, writer, and sex therapist

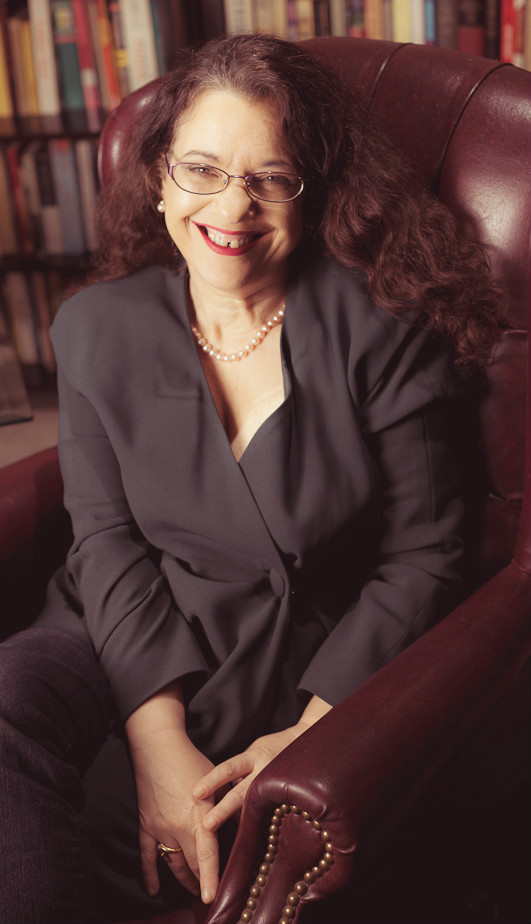
- Brame in 2014
- Born: Gloria Glickstein Brame; August 20, 1955 (age 70); New York City, U.S.
- Occupations: Sexologist, writer, sex therapist
- Website: gloriabrame.com

Gloria Glickstein Brame (born August 20, 1955) is an American writer on sexology and sex therapist based in Athens, Georgia.

== Early life ==
Brame was born on August 20, 1955, at Beth Israel Hospital in New York City to Jewish Holocaust survivors. She was raised in Brooklyn, New York. She graduated from Sheepshead Bay High School in Brooklyn in 1972. She earned a B.A. in English with honors, summa cum laude, from York College, City University of New York in 1977, and an M.A. in English Literature from Columbia University in 1978.

== Career ==
After completing her M.A., Brame worked as a financial analyst at Morgan Stanley from 1983 to 1986. She then transitioned to academia, serving as an adjunct professor of English at New York University, guest lecturer in creative writing at York College (CUNY), and associate professor of poetry and creative writing at Hofstra University from 1987 to 1991.

In 1987, Brame founded an online BDSM support group in the Human Sexuality Forum of CompuServe. In 1991, she began research for a book on BDSM and human sexuality, Different Loving, co-authored with William D. Brame and Jon Jacobs and published by Villard/Random House in 1993.

Brame earned a Ph.D. in Human Sexuality from the Institute for Advanced Study of Human Sexuality in San Francisco and was certified as a sexologist by the American College of Sexologists in 2002. She maintains a private sex therapy practice and is an emeritus professional member of the American Association of Sexuality Educators, Counselors and Therapists (AASECT).

In 1991, Brame began research for a book BDSM and human sexuality, Different Loving, her published in 1993.

Brame testified as an expert witness against then-U.S. Attorney General John Ashcroft in Nitke v. Ashcroft, a case challenging the obscenity provisions of the Communications Decency Act before the Southern District of New York.

== Bibliography ==
=== Nonfiction ===
- Different Loving: The World of Sexual Dominance and Submission (Villard/Random House, 1993)
- “Marquis de Sade, Donatien Alphonse François (1740–1814),” The International Encyclopedia of Human Sexuality (2015)

== Media ==
Brame has given numerous radio and television interviews with BBC, CBS, NBC, CNBC, FOX, PBS, and foreign media. She has been cited in numerous magazines and newspapers, including a 2004 profile in The Washington Post.
