= Macho Sluts =

1988 book by Pat Califia

- Cover of the first edition
- Author: Pat Califia
- Language: English
- Publisher: Alyson Publications
- Publication date: 1988
- Publication place: United States
- Media type: Print

Macho Sluts is a 1988 book of erotic short stories by Pat Califia, published by Alyson Publications. Then lesbian identified, Califia had written the stories between 1977 and 1988 during a period of fierce struggle between lesbian feminist sadomasochism practitioners and anti-pornography feminists in the San Francisco Bay Area. Media scholar Carolyn Bronstein has characterized these articles, and the anthology, as lesbian romance fiction. As such, they made lesbians visible within the leather and sadomasochist communities, and lesbians practicing what came to be known as "power exchange" visible in the feminist community. Bronstein characterizes the collection as an activist response to anti-pornography feminists' characterization of sadomasochism as a "dangerous form of sexuality that reproduced the positions of power associated with heterosexuality."

Exploring sadomasochism fantasy concepts, it includes the stories "The Calyx of Isis" and "Jessie" along with six other shorter works, "The Finishing School", "The Hustler", "The Surprise Party", "The Vampire", "The Spoiler", and "A Dash of Vanilla". It includes lesbians, gay men, and those of indeterminate sexuality, with their broad ranges of fantasies.

On its original publication the book was sold in a plastic shrink wrap with a free badge stating "Macho Slut".
