= Laura Antoniou =

American novelist (born 1963)

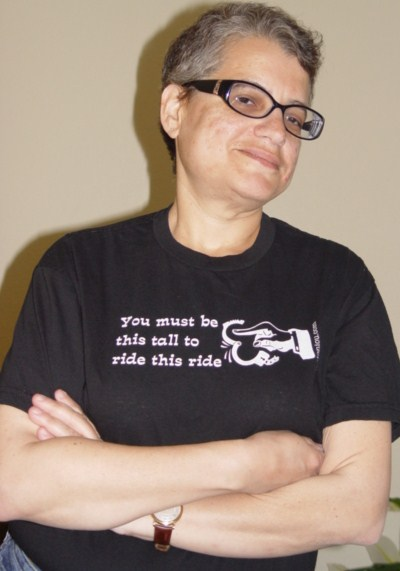
- Born: 1963 (age 62–63)
- Occupation: Novelist
- Writing career
- Pen name: Sara Adamson
- Genre: Erotic literature

Laura Antoniou (born 1963) is an American novelist. She is the author of The Marketplace series of BDSM-themed novels, which were originally published under the pen name of Sara Adamson.

Antoniou is also known for her work as an editor and pioneer in the field of contemporary erotic fiction and in particular as editor of lesbian erotica anthologies including the three-volume Leather Women series, Some Women, By Her Subdued, No Other Tribute, and a collection of her own short stories and essays titled The Catalyst and Other Works.

Antoniou's fiction and her essays on alternate views of sexual roles have been cited by writers on the evolution of erotic fiction, and on the social politics of gender roles. Documentary filmmaker and author Tanya Trepanier described Antoniou as part of a growing trend of novelists exploring hybrid forms of identity, including cultural and sexual identity, that don't fit into simple categories, using narrative storytelling as a way of understanding identities that can't be easily defined in a traditional manner. In an analysis of contemporary novelists in the area of women's erotic fiction, Carolyn Allen cites Antoniou's writings as describing the concept that all relationships between people include elements of power exchange, with one partner taking the more dominant role even in day-to-day interactions. Nikki Sullivan, lecturer in Cultural and Critical Studies at Macquarie University, in her essay Sadomasochism as Resistance? refers to Antoniou's description of sexual roles as a loose structure, due to the many choices available to the participants, with the key element being the choice of which participant guides the activities.

Writings by Antoniou are at the Leather Archives and Museum.

== Awards and honors ==
Year	Work	Award	Result	Ref.
2011		National Leather Association's Lifetime Achievement Award	Recipient	
2011	"That's Harsh"	National Leather Association's John Preston Short Fiction Award	Winner	
2012		Master Jack McGeorge Excellence in Education Award	Recipient	
2012		Mr. Marcus Hernandez Lifetime Achievement Award (Woman)	Recipient	
2012	"The Man with the Phoenix Tattoo"	National Leather Association's John Preston Short Fiction Award	Winner	
2014	The Killer Wore Leather	National Leather Association's Pauline Reage Novel Award	Winner	
2014	The Killer Wore Leather	Lambda Literary Award for Lesbian Mystery	Finalist	
2014	No Safe Words	National Leather Association's Samois Anthology Award	Winner	

== Partial bibliography ==
- Laura Antoniou, writing as Anonymous: Lady F, Masquerade, 1993, ISBN 978-1-56333-642-3 (out of print)
- Laura Antoniou, Looking for Mr. Preston, Richard Kasak Books, 1995, ISBN 978-1-56333-288-3 (out of print)
- Laura Antoniou, writing as Christopher Morgan, Musclebound and Other Stories, Alyson Books, 2002 ISBN 978-1-55583-651-1 (previously published by Masquerade Books, 1996)
- Laura Antoniou, The Marketplace, Circlet Press, 2010 ISBN 978-1-885865-57-1 (originally published by Masquerade in 1993 and then Mystic Rose Books in 2000)
- Laura Antoniou, The Slave, Mystic Rose Books, 2001 ISBN 978-0-9645960-5-4 (originally published by Masquerade in 1994)
- Laura Antoniou, The Trainer, Mystic Rose Books 2001 ISBN 978-0-9645960-6-1 (originally published by Masquerade in 1995)
- Laura Antoniou, The Academy: Tales of the Marketplace, Ed. Karen Taylor. Mystic Rose Books, 2000 ISBN 978-0-9645960-3-0
- Laura Antoniou, The Reunion, Mystic Rose books, 2002, ISBN 0-9645960-7-5
- Laura Antoniou, No Other Tribute: Erotic Tales of Women in Submission, Rhinoceros Books, 1997, ISBN 1-56333-603-0
- Laura Antoniou, Leatherwomen, Rosebud Books, 1998, ISBN 1-56333-598-0
- Laura Antoniou, The Catalyst and Other Works, Mystic Rose Books 2004, ISBN 0-9645960-8-3 (previously published by Masquerade Books, 1991)
- Laura Antoniou, Lori Selke (Ed.), Tough Girls: Down and Dirty Dyke Erotica, Black Books, 2001, ISBN 1-892723-12-3
- Laura Antoniou, Christina Abernathy, Erotic Slavehood: A Miss Abernathy Omnibus, Greenery Press, 2007, ISBN 1-890159-71-9
- Laura Antoniou, The Killer Wore Leather: An S/M Mystery, Cleis Press, 2013, ISBN 978-1-57344-930-4
- Laura Antoniou, The Inheritor, Circlet Press, 2015, ISBN 978-1-61390-127-4
