= Nitke v. Gonzales =

American legal case

- Court: United States District Court for the Southern District of New York
- Full case name: NITKE v. GONZALEZ, 413 F.Supp.2d 262 (S.D.N.Y. 2005)
- Decided: July 25, 2005
- Citations: 253 F.Supp.2d 587 (S.D.N.Y. 2003), 413 F.Supp.2d 262 (S.D.N.Y. 2005)

Case history
- Subsequent action: The US Supreme Court denied an appeal against the decision in Nitke v. Gonzalez on March 20, 2006 (affirming district court decision).

Holding
- The plaintiff failed to show substantial variation in community standards as applied in the "Miller test" that could lead to the unnecessary impairing of First Amendment protected speech. The overbreadth of the CDA was therefore not found and the injunctive relief was denied.

Court membership
- Judges sitting: Robert D. Sack, Richard M. Berman, Gerard E. Lynch

Keywords
- Communications Decency Act of 1996, Miller test, Obscenity

Nitke v. Gonzalez, 413 F.Supp.2d 262 (S.D.N.Y. 2005) was a United States District Court for the Southern District of New York case regarding obscene materials published online. The plaintiff challenged the constitutionality of the obscenity provision of the Communications Decency Act (CDA). She claimed that it was overbroad when applied in the context of the Internet because certain contents deemed lawful in some communities and unlawful in others will be restricted due to the open access of the Internet. The plaintiff also sought a permanent injunction against the enforcement of the obscenity provision of the CDA. The court concluded that insufficient evidence was presented to show there was substantial variation in community standards, as applied in the "Miller test", and to show how much protected speech would actually be impaired because of these differences. The relief sought was denied, and the court ruled for the defendant. The Supreme Court subsequently affirmed this ruling without comment.

== Background ==
Nitke had published images on her website that were a means of alternative sexual expression: adults performing various sexual activities. Previously, in Reno v. ACLU, the Supreme Court had ruled that the indecent speech provision in the CDA was overbroad and that it unnecessarily impaired protected speech. Barbara Nitke and the National Coalition for Sexual Freedom, which advocates for people who practice non-traditional sexual practices, sought a similar ruling against the "obscene speech" provisions of the CDA and injunctive relief against future application of those sections of the CDA, arguing that the differences in community standards of what is considered "obscene speech" would have a "chilling effect" on any content on the Internet. Alberto Gonzales was the Attorney General of the United States at the time, making him the named defendant in this case.

=== The Communications Decency Act of 1996 ===
47 U.S.C. § 223(a)(1)(B) criminalizes conduct which "knowingly ...makes, creates or solicits, and ... initiates the transmission of ..." an obscene or indecent communication to a juvenile. Subject to certain defenses, this is regardless of whether or not the minor accessed the content or not. "Given the size of the potential audience for most messages, in the absence of a viable age verification process, the sender [of any given communication] must be charged with knowing that one or more minors will likely view it."

== Vagueness ==
The court granted the government's motion to dismiss the vagueness argument, citing the Supreme Court's decision that the Miller test was not unconstitutionally vague.

== Overbreadth ==
The plaintiffs in this case had the burden of proving that the CDA was substantially overbroad. Specifically, the court indicated that the plaintiffs needed to establish:

1. that a substantive amount of speech was not covered by the societal value prong of the Miller test and that these contents would lead to different conclusions when subjected to different community standards in the country.
2. that the variation in community standards were causing suppression of speech and that there was no viable measure to limit the exposure of the contents to those communities with more accepting standards.
3. that the affirmative defenses of the CDA were not sufficient in limiting the coverage of protected speech by the CDA.

The court concluded that insufficient evidence was provided by the plaintiffs to support these points, and the United States Supreme Court denied their appeal in 2006. "The judgment is affirmed."

== Responses ==
The case established community content guidelines for obscene content. If the case had not been brought, according to attorney John Wirenius, "many more Internet users [would] likely face the constitutionally unsupportable choice faced by Ms. Nitke: either to censor her published images or face prosecution." This would, in turn, cause users and publishers to use more discretion when publishing potentially obscene content online.

The Electronic Frontier Foundation said, "...while it might be unconstitutional for someone to use the CDA to prosecute Nitke specifically, there are other instances in which the court believes it would be constitutional to use the CDA to prosecute a web publisher for obscenity." Their brief in support of Nitke concluded by saying that: "such identification schemes abridge the right to read anonymously."

== See also ==
- Miller v. California
- National Coalition for Sexual Freedom
- Miller test
- Florence v. Shurtleff
