= Patrick Califia =

American writer (born 1954)

- Born: March 8, 1954 (age 72); Corpus Christi, Texas, U.S.
- Other names: Pat Califia; Pat Califia-Rice; Patrick Califia-Rice
- Education: San Francisco State University
- Occupations: Writer, therapist

Patrick Califia (born 1954), formerly also known as Pat Califia and by the last name Califia-Rice, is an American writer of non-fiction essays about sexuality and of erotic fiction and poetry. Califia is a bisexual trans man. Prior to transitioning, Califia was a lesbian and wrote for many years a sex advice column for the gay men's leather magazine Drummer. His writings explore sexuality and gender identity, and have included lesbian erotica and works about BDSM subculture. Califia is a member of the third-wave feminism movement.

== Early life ==
Califia was born in Corpus Christi, Texas in 1954 and assigned female at birth. He grew up in Utah in a Latter Day Saint family, the eldest of six children. His father was a construction worker and his mother a housewife. Califia has stated he did not have a good childhood, saying that his father was an angry and violent man and his mother a pious woman.

Califia recalled one incident where he told his parents he wanted to be a train engineer, and they told him he couldn't because he was a girl. He replied that he wasn't a girl.

In the 1970s, Califia's parents had him admitted to a psychiatric hospital, and he dropped out of the University of Utah, Salt Lake City, due to his mental state. Califia came out as a lesbian in 1971 while attending college. He began using the last name Califia, after the mythical female warrior Amazon. Califia began to evade his parents, and became involved in the women's liberation and anti-war movements. After getting involved in consciousness raising in the area, he moved to San Francisco in 1973, bringing an interest in sex education to work on the San Francisco Sex Information switchboard. After moving to San Francisco he began writing for a magazine and joined a lesbian separatist movement. In 1975 he spoke in favor of sadomasochism and found himself excluded from the lesbian feminist community. He was not only excluded from his nuclear family by coming out as a lesbian but also lost his gay family when speaking his opinions. Califia became increasingly involved in S/M activities not only with lesbians but also with gay men. He co-founded the first lesbian BDSM group in the United States, Samois, in 1978.

== Education ==
Califia began attending the University of Utah in Salt Lake City in 1971. In 1981, he graduated from San Francisco State University (SFSU) with a bachelor of arts degree in psychology. He has also said he has a master's degree.

== Career and honors ==
In 1980, Califia published his first book—Sapphistry: The Book of Lesbian Sexuality, a non-fiction work for lesbians which described, in a non-judgmental tone, butch-femme sexuality, and BDSM safety and practice. Subsequently, he published work in lesbian, gay and feminist magazines, including a long-running sex advice column in The Advocate.

Califia is "one of [the] earliest champions of lesbian sadomasochistic sex" whose "work has been taught on college campuses across the country and abroad." He has a long history of transgression, being a feminist, lesbian, and transgender while also at times finding rejection from those communities "for various infractions." He played what some observers termed a "notable role" in the Feminist Sex Wars of the 1970s/1980s. The sides were characterized by anti-porn feminist and sex-positive feminist groups with disagreements regarding sexuality, pornography and other forms of sexual representation, prostitution, the role of trans women in the lesbian community, lesbian sexual practices, sadomasochism, and other sexual issues. Califia rejected the "essentialist, feminist ideology—that women are better, more nurturing, more peaceful, more loving, more relationship-oriented and less raunchy in bed," instead advocating for BDSM, "the consensual integration of power, pain, domination and submission into sex." According to the San Francisco Chronicle, many feminists were won over to Califia's views on S/M not from his arguments, but from his erotic fiction: "they read Califia-Rice's S/M fantasies, got turned on and got over it."

In 1979, as a student in psychology at San Francisco State University, his research was published in the Journal of Homosexuality.

Califia co-founded Samois, a lesbian-feminist BDSM organization based in San Francisco that existed from 1978 to 1983, and shifted his focus to the lesbian experience of BDSM. The Samois Collective produced, with Califia's contributions, the book Coming to Power, published by Alyson Publications. Coming To Power, according to Heather Findlay, editor-in-chief of lesbian magazine Girlfriends, was "one of the most transformative lesbian books, [foretelling] the end of a certain puritanism that had dominated the community. It was the first articulate defense of lesbian S/M, and that was the end of it." Another book, the Lesbian S/M Safety Manual, won the 1990 Bookseller/Diagram Prize for Oddest Title of the Year.

In 1989, Califia and Geoff Mains received the Steve Maidhof Award for National or International Work from the National Leather Association International.

In 1992, Califia received the Woman of the Year award as part of the Pantheon of Leather Awards.

Also in 1992, Califia founded the leatherwomen's quarterly Venus Infers and published "Feminism, Paedophilia, and Children's Rights" in a special women's issue of Paidika, a journal focused on scholarly studies about pedophilia and specifically pederasty. Califia stated in 1991 that he 'support[s] Paidika and enjoyed working with the editors of this special issue'. Califia . In 'Public Sex: The Culture of Radical Sex', Califia explained that he had criticized age of consent laws because they were inconsistent from state to state and applied disproportionately to gay men, and criticized 'the vague and far-reaching language of child pornography laws'; he stated that he had previously 'argued that the existing laws against sexual assault should be enforced whenever a minor complained of unwanted sexual attention or violence. I believed that if adults would listen, children were capable of telling us what kind of attention they wanted or when something harmful had happened to them.' Califia also stated in 2000 that he had previously supported the pedophilia advocacy organization North American Man/Boy Love Association, but clarified that 'I don't agree with NAMBLA, because their position is that age-of-consent laws should be repealed, and there are members of that organization who think it's OK for prepubescent children to have sexual relationships with adults, and I just cannot agree with that. I think it's developmentally inappropriate.' This was one of many ways that Califia had reconsidered his previous stances on the age of consent and adult / child sex: 'I was naive about the developmental issues that make sex between adults and prepubescent children unacceptable,'; 'I've become much more cynical about the ability of adults to listen to children'; 'Perhaps because I am a parent now, I am less idealistic about the possibilities for an equal adult / child relationship'. He explained the context of his views at the time: he 'knew several gay men who proudly called themselves boy-lovers', and in the late 1970s (Califia's early to mid 20s), he 'wished [he] could [have relied] on adults like them for guidance and erotic initiation when [he] was a teenager trying to come out.' He also disclosed his own childhood experiences as a contributing factor to his previous views: 'Today, I believe that the libertarian position I took in these articles sprang from a painful family history that I was not ready or able to face. I grew up being terrorized by a violent father whose sexuality was an ongoing threat ... This history of child abuse, combined with my unconscious need to repress my own victimization, led me to normalize child/adult sex. The fantasy that such experiences could be loving or healthy protected me from feeling unloved, weak or violated.'

In 1996, he was co-editor, with Robin Sweeney, of The Second Coming: A Leatherdyke Reader, a sequel to Coming to Power. Califia was writing about queer studies and gender identity, and coming to terms with these issues on a personal level. At age 45, Califia transitioned, taking the name Patrick.

In 2000, Califia received the Forebear Award as part of the Pantheon of Leather Awards.

In a 2000 interview, Califia explained that the inspiration for his erotic writings varies; sometimes it is just about having fun, or it can be satire, or exploring a sexuality issue like HIV-positive people barebacking with the intention of infecting the other person with the virus. In the interview with Rona Marech, Califia is quoted as saying:

It's about me trying to put a human face on that and understand that from the inside out. ...It's about being thought-provoking, hopefully. And I like (presenting issues) that challenge the reader; that are maybe a little scary, maybe hard to think about. ...It's also a way to top a lot of people. In some ways, I get to do a scene with everyone who reads one [sic] my books.

Janet Hardy, of Greenery Press, admires Califia's tenacity, stating, "He's got a phenomenal mind.... He's willing to get a hold of a thought and follow it through to the end, even if it doesn't feel comfortable."

Califia was nominated for the Lambda Literary Awards for his short-story collection, Macho Sluts (1988), his novel, Doc and Fluff: The Dystopian Tale of a Girl and Her Biker (1990), and a compilation of his columns, The Advocate Adviser (1991). He is working on a book that discusses the topic of FTM sexuality, and is working on a new set of essays surrounding the topic of BDSM. He has also written vampire books.

Califia presented a paper for the American Academy of Religion conference in Montréal, November 19–22, 2009, on the gay marriage debate, and how arguments about monogamy and S/M have been used to try to control the argument.

When Califia would travel to Canada, his pornographic works were often seized by Canadian customs, until he fought a court case to allow them to be accepted. Afterwards, he wrote of his amusement at finding that anti-porn feminist Catherine Itzin's book Pornography: Women, Violence and Civil Liberties was seized under the very law he had helped to establish, while Califia's books were recognized as acceptable by that law. Califia fought against anti-pornography legislation co-authored by Catharine MacKinnon.

In 2013, he was named by Equality Forum as one of their 31 Icons of the LGBT History Month.

From 2001 to 2011, Califia was licensed in California as a marriage and family therapist (MFT).

Califia is an inductee of the Society of Janus Hall of Fame.

== Personal life ==
Califia has a son, Blake Califia-Rice (born October 1999), to whom his ex-partner, Matt Rice, a trans man, gave birth.

Califia has said that, since the 1990s, he has had fibromyalgia.

Califia has said he incorporates elements of Mormonism in his approach to life. One tenet of Mormonism he said he believes in is "if the truth has been revealed to you and you don't speak out, you are culpable for any wrongs that are committed in those realms of life."

=== Transition ===
In 1999, Califia decided to begin hormone replacement therapy as a part of his transition. Califia had considered sex reassignment in his twenties, but had been hesitant as there were many dangers to the surgery at that time. He also hesitated because his career had been built around a reputation as a lesbian writer and activist. Califia had entered age-related perimenopause when he began his transition. He has stated that being a man or a woman was never a good fit for him but sex reassignment seemed to be the most reasonable option.

== Selected bibliography ==
=== Non-fiction ===
- Sapphistry: The Book of Lesbian Sexuality (1980) (ISBN 978-0-93-004414-5)
- Public Sex: The Culture of Radical Sex (1994) (ISBN 978-0-93-941689-9)
- Feminism and Sadomasochism, a chapter/article in Feminism and Sexuality: A Reader (1996)
  (edited by Stevi Jackson and Sue Scott) (ISBN 978-0-23-110708-2)
- Sex Changes: The Politics of Transgenderism (1997) (ISBN 978-1-57-344072-1)
- Speaking Sex to Power: The Politics of Queer Sex (2001) (ISBN 978-1-57-344132-2)
- Sensuous Magic: A Guide to S/M for Adventurous Couples (1ed 1993, 2ed 2001) (ISBN 9781573441308)

=== Fiction ===
- Macho Sluts: Erotic Fiction (July 1994) (ISBN 978-1-55-583115-8)
- (as editor) Doing It for Daddy: Short and Sexy Fiction about a Very Forbidden Fantasy (December 1994) (ISBN 978-1-55-583227-8)
- Doc and Fluff: The Dystopian Tale of a Girl and Her Biker (May 2000) (ISBN 978-1-55-583369-5)
- No Mercy: Short Stories (June 2000) (ISBN 978-1-55-583542-2)
- Melting Point (November 2000) (ISBN 978-1-55-583380-0)

== See also ==
- Catacombs (sex club)
