= The Eulenspiegel Society =

American BDSM organization

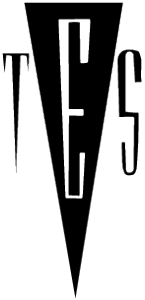
Logo of TES

The Eulenspiegel Society, also known as TES, is the first BDSM organization founded in the United States. It was founded in 1971 and based in New York City.

== History ==
The Eulenspiegel Society was the first BDSM organization founded in the United States. It was founded in 1971 in New York City by Pat Bond, a music teacher, and Fran Nowve, as an informal association and support group for masochists; sadists joined shortly after in that same year.

Bond placed an ad in Screw magazine in December 1970, reading:

"Masochist? Happy? Is it curable? Does psychiatry help? Is a satisfactory life-style possible? There’s women’s lib, black lib, gay lib, etc. Isn’t it time we put something together?"

The ad also ran in the East Village Other. Fran Nowve, using the name Terry Kolb, was the first person to answer the ad. She and Bond began The Eulenspiegel Society in 1971, and Nowve came up with its name.

In August 1971, The Eulenspiegel Society's members voted to include sadists in the organization. The Eulenspiegel Society originally met in members' homes, and then met in rented space in theaters and churches. The organization was an active part of the 1970s sexual revolution, as well as LGBT activism, including marching in New York City Pride Parades beginning in the early 1970s. The organization also launched Prometheus, a decades-long-running magazine, in the early 1970s, exploring issues important to kinksters, ranging from advice columns and personal ads, to erotica and art, to conversation about the philosophy of consensual kink. The magazine now exists online.

From 1973 until he died in 1983, Jack Jackson, a black leatherman, was the first president of The Eulenspiegel Society; to “signal that he was forever one with the title”, The Eulenspiegel Society has not had a president since, leaving him as its only one. He was inducted into the Leather Hall of Fame in 2021.

In 1992, The Eulenspiegel Society's cofounder Pat Bond received the Steve Maidhof Award for National or International Work from the National Leather Association International.

In 1993, Leather Pride Night by The Eulenspiegel Society, Excelsior MC, GMS/MA, LSM, and NLA: Metro New York received the Large Event of the Year award as part of the Pantheon of Leather Awards.

In 1994, Barbara Nitke attended her first meeting of The Eulenspiegel Society to see a presentation by underground photographer Charles Gatewood. The couples she met in the SM scene fascinated her, and she began photographing them in 1994. They became the focus of her book, Kiss of Fire: A Romantic View of Sadomasochism (2003). It was among the first mainstream publications to examine the subject of BDSM.

In 1996, The Eulenspiegel Society hosted the first large BDSM convention, in celebration of its 25th anniversary. This event was so well attended that the organization took over two large clubs (Hellfire Club and The Vault) as well as a disco which was converted into a club. Over 1,300 people attended. This event inspired other leather organizations to hold annual conventions as well. In 1997, this event received the Large Event of the Year award as part of the Pantheon of Leather Awards.

The Eulenspiegel Society was one of the founding coalition partners of the National Coalition for Sexual Freedom, which was founded in 1997.

In 1999, Gary Switch posted to The Eulenspiegel Society's USENET list "TES-Friends" proposing the term RACK (Risk-aware consensual kink) out of a desire to form a more accurate portrayal of the type of play that many engage in. Noting that nothing is truly 100% safe, not even crossing the street, Switch compared BDSM to the sport of mountain climbing. In both, risk is an essential part of the thrill, and that risk is minimized through study, training, technique, and practice.

In 2002, The Eulenspiegel Society reorganized as "The TES Association." It retains rights to its original name and historical intellectual property.

In 2003, TES received the Large Club of the Year award as part of the Pantheon of Leather Awards.

In 2011, TES was inducted into the Leather Hall of Fame (under the name Eulenspiegel Society).

In 2015, Bond and Nowve (the latter under the name Terry Kolb) were inducted into the Leather Hall of Fame.

== Organizational activities ==
TES (pronounced "Tess,") is an entirely volunteer-run nonprofit organization, including an elected board of directors. It "promotes sexual liberation for all adults, especially for people who enjoy consensual S/M". It regards sexual liberation as a prerequisite for a "truly free" society and it is particularly concerned about the freedom of sexual minorities such as the BDSM community.

TES generally holds two classes each week (over 100 a year) in New York City, both general meetings, and ones hosted by special interest groups, ranging from bondage to meet-ups for novices interested in alternative sexualities. In 1996, TES hosted the first large BDSM convention, in celebration of its 25th anniversary. This event was so well attended that the organization took over two large clubs (Hellfire Club and The Vault) as well as a disco which was converted into a club. Over 1,300 people attended. This event inspired other leather organizations to hold annual conventions as well. It also hosts frequent social events, including parties. Membership includes discounts at participating stores and clubs. It also supports AIDS prevention education and organizations such as the Free Speech Coalition (FSC) and the National Coalition for Sexual Freedom, for which TES is a founding coalition partner.

== Name ==
The Eulenspiegel Society took its name from Till Eulenspiegel, a character described as a "foolish yet clever lad" in medieval German folklore. It changed its legal name to "The TES Association" in 2002, although it still uses and is widely known by the original name. The original name, which cofounder Fran Nowve came up with, was inspired by a passage from Austrian psychoanalyst Theodor Reik's Masochism in Modern Man (1941), in which he argues that patients who engage in self-punishing or provocative behavior do so in order to demonstrate their emotional fortitude, induce guilt in others, and achieve a sense of "victory through defeat". Reik describes Till Eulenspiegel's "peculiar" behavior—he enjoys walking uphill, and feels "dejected" walking downhill—and compares it to a "paradox reminiscent of masochism", because Till Eulenspiegel "gladly submits to discomfort, enjoys it, even transforms it into pleasure".
