= National Leather Association International =

BDSM organization based in the United States

- Nickname: NLA-I
- Formation: 1986; 40 years ago
- Website: www.nla-international.com
- Formerly called: National Leather Association (NLA)

National Leather Association International (NLA-I) is a BDSM organization, based in the United States with chapters in various cities in the United States and Canada. It was founded in 1986 as the "National Leather Association" (NLA), as a national integrated organization including gay leathermen, kinky heterosexuals and bisexuals, SM lesbians and transgender sadomasochists, and representing their interests in the face of prosecutions. Adding "International" to its name in 1991, the organization staged "Living in Leather" gatherings until 2002. After a period of decline around the turn of the millennium, NLA-I has become more active again and runs a series of awards for fiction and non-fiction writing. NLA-I's records can be found at the Leather Archives and Museum.

== History ==
=== Origins ===
When the NLA was formed, prosecutions against sadomasochistic media and even individuals who practiced it consensually and in private, such as in the 1990 UK Operation Spanner case, had increased. Organisations such as the National Leather Association were a response to this environment, and the NLA played a leading role in raising funds for the Spanner defendants.

Competing in the 1986 International Mr. Leather (IML) contest inspired Steve Maidhof to organize a conference for members of the growing SM, leather, and fetish community. Unlike IML, this conference would focus on education and political activism. To host this conference, named Living in Leather, Maidhof recruited several friends and leading members of Seattle's leather community including: Cookie Andrews-Hunt, Wayne Gloege, Billy Jefferson, Jan Lyon, George Nelson, and Vik Stump. Together, they formed the National Leather Association (NLA), which officially incorporated in the summer of 1986. In October, they hosted the first Living in Leather (LIL) conference in Seattle. It was a rousing success that inspired SM/leather activism around the country. LIL became an annual event and sparked the formation of NLA chapters in Vancouver and Portland. While publicly described as a gay/lesbian organization, a growing number of heterosexuals attended LIL conferences and joined the NLA, which became a pansexual organization. From its origins, the NLA was a meeting place for a diverse array of people exploring the boundaries of their sexuality. At the request of members living outside the United States, the organization changed its name to "National Leather Association - International" in 1991.

=== Later events ===
The NLA helped organize the leather conference that preceded the 1987 March on Washington for Lesbian and Gay Rights. Along with the creation of the NLA itself, that conference sparked the infamous Dallas Conference, which met in February 1988 to discuss creating a national SM/leather/fetish organization. Best remembered for vitriolic arguments that exposed divisions in the community between men and women, the East Coast and West Coast, old clubs and new, and those not affiliated with any club, the conference created a new organization named Safe Sane Consensual Adults (SSCA). Burdened by the political infighting of Dallas, the SSCA failed to gain support and merged with the NLA, the only functioning, national BDSM organization. The first co-chairs of NLA after the merger were Jim Richards and Judy Tallwing McCarthy. Over the past 26 years, roughly three dozen NLA chapters formed, though only about a dozen of these are currently active. In 1989, a deaf chapter of the NLA called “NLA: Deaf Chapter”, which eventually became International Deaf Leather, was founded by Michael Felts, Philip Rubin, Bob Donaldson, Rolf Hagton, Jim Dunne, Bobby Andrascik and Charles Wilkinson. International Deaf Leather ended in 2021.

The merger with the SSCA sparked a tremendous increase in the NLA's membership, which by the end of 1991 had grown to 827 members scattered across 46 US states and parts of Canada. Chapters increased from three to 16 and new ones continued to form, giving the NLA a presence in practically every major U.S. city. At its peak, the NLA (later NLAI) had chapters in every major American city including New York, Chicago, Detroit, Seattle, Portland, and Los Angeles, as well as Vancouver and Toronto in Canada. The NLA aimed to bridge gaps of geography, experience, gender, and sexual orientation. As Laura Antoniou recently noted: "It was NLA that dared to believe we could call ourselves a 'community,' 25 years ago. Today, we use the term as if we’ve always thought of all the myriad parts of our BDSM/kink/rubber/leather/fetish/whoozits groups as somehow connected. But it was NLA that gave us that truly radical notion--that the kinksters in Butte had something in common with the players in Raleigh, and with the clubs in New York City."

Living in Leather thrived as an event, attracting more people each year as it moved from Seattle (LIL 1, 2, and 3) to Portland (LIL 4 and 5), and then Chicago (LIL 6 and 7). Attendance topped 700 and LIL became the premier event for SM education and organizing and attracted the community's best-known speakers and leaders. A particularly notable LIL event was held on October 11, 1991; at the opening ceremonies of that event, a Canadian version of the leather pride flag was presented, which added to the original flag's design a row of red maple leaves running horizontally through the white stripe. In 1994 Living in Leather VIII received the Large Event of the Year award as part of the Pantheon of Leather Awards.

The NLA fought against censorship, raised awareness about domestic violence, supported SM/leather clubs and people harassed by the police, and raised funds for local and national political causes. Chuck Higgins led the NLA's best known initiative of these years: raising funds for the appeal of the Operation Spanner defendants, 18 British men convicted and imprisoned for engaging in consensual SM activities. NLA members demonstrated outside the British consulate in Chicago and spearheaded American fundraising activities that raised more than $50,000 and paid more than half the Operation Spanner defendants' legal expenses. Befitting the recent name change to NLA-International, the NLA began acting internationally.

=== Decline and revival ===
In the late 1990s, the NLA's leaders increasingly struggled to redefine their organization to meet the changing needs of the SM/leather/fetish community. New organizations filled needs previously met by the NLA. The National Coalition for Sexual Freedom (which the NLA was one of the founding coalition partners of) helped members of sexual minorities with legal problems, while the Leather Leadership Conference provided a forum for political discussion and activism. Attendance at both LIL 14 (Fort Lauderdale, 1999) and LIL 15 (Seattle, 2000) proved disappointing, and the latter event left the NLA deeply in debt. Membership fell, and LIL 16 was canceled for lack of registration. Morale plummeted. A ballot initiative to dissolve the NLA failed, but solutions to the NLA's problems proved elusive. However, one notable relevant positive event occurred at this time, when on December 12, 2000, NLA Florida presented a suggested pledge of allegiance to the leather pride flag at its holiday party in Fort Lauderdale, which reads, “I pledge allegiance to the Leather Pride flag, and the union of Leather people for which it stands, with safety, sanity and consent for all.” As well, the Dallas chapter hosted LIL in 2002, but this proved the last LIL. Lacking leadership and direction, the organization neared collapse over the next two years, but its local chapters kept it afloat, particularly those in Columbus, Dallas, New England, and Oklahoma City. A succession of interim presidents stabilized NLA-I and paid off its debt, paving the way for renewed growth in chapters and membership. Since then, the organization has rebounded thanks for new members and chapters. In 2007 NLA-I inaugurated awards for excellence in SM/fetish/leather writing. The categories are: the Geoff Mains award for non-fiction book, the Cynthia Slater award for non-fiction article, the Pauline Reage award for fiction novel, the John Preston award for short fiction and the Samois award for anthology. Past recipients include, among others, Laura Antoniou, Gloria Brame, Rachel Kramer Bussel, Jack Fritscher, Gayle Rubin, David Stein, Cecilia Tan, Tristan Taormino and L M Somerton. In 2019 NLA-I created the Erotic Art Awards. The categories are: Chéri Hérouard - Realism, Clovis Trouille - Surrealism, Gene Bilbrew - Animation, Aubrey Beardsley - Abstract, and Michael Kirwan - Expressionism.

== Awards and recognition ==
In 1992 the NLA received the Large Nonprofit Organization of the Year award as part of the Pantheon of Leather Awards.

In 1993 Pride Night by NLA: Metro New York, The Eulenspiegel Society, Excelsior MC, GMS/MA, and LSM received the Large Event of the Year award as part of the Pantheon of Leather Awards.

In 1994 Living in Leather VIII received the Large Event of the Year award as part of the Pantheon of Leather Awards.

The NLA is commemorated in the AIDS Quilt.

== Local chapters ==
NLA chapters are currently active in:

- Columbus, OH
- Dallas, TX (In 1999 this chapter received the Large Club of the Year award as part of the Pantheon of Leather Awards. In 2001 the event Beyond Vanilla by this chapter received the Small Event of the Year award as part of the Pantheon of Leather Awards, and in 2015 the chapter received the Chapter of the Year Award from the NLA.)
- Houston, TX (In 2011 and 2018 the chapter received the Chapter of the Year Award from the NLA.)
- Northern Nevada (In 2017 the chapter received the Chapter of the Year Award from the NLA.)
- Oklahoma City, OK (In 2012 and 2016 the chapter received the Chapter of the Year Award from the NLA.)
- Orlando, FL
- San Antonio, TX (In 2020 the chapter received the Chapter of the Year Award from the NLA.)
- Utah (In 2014 the chapter received the Chapter of the Year Award from the NLA.)

== See also ==
- Steve Stein, Twenty-Five Years of Living in Leather: The National Leather Association, 1986-2011 (Adynaton, 2012, ISBN 978-0985900403)
- Leather Archives and Museum
- National Coalition for Sexual Freedom
