= National Coalition for Sexual Freedom =

Organization

- Formation: 1997
- Type: Non-profit
- Headquarters: Baltimore, Maryland, US
- Chairperson: Tess Zachary
- Website: ncsfreedom.org

The National Coalition for Sexual Freedom (NCSF) is an American sex-positive advocacy and educational organization founded in 1997. NCSF has over one hundred coalition partners (consisting of businesses including law firms, mental health professionals, and clubs), and over sixty supporting members (composed of individuals and businesses). NCSF advocates on behalf of adults involved in alternative lifestyles with respect to sexuality and relationship composition, specifically for tolerance and non-discrimination of those so identified, as well as education for adults involved in such lifestyles. The organization's main office is in Baltimore, Maryland.

== Founding ==
In 1997 the NCSF was founded by Susan Wright, under the auspices of the New York SM Activists. Black Rose, The Eulenspiegel Society, Gay Male S/M Activists, National Leather Association International, and the Society of Janus were its founding coalition partners.

== Mission ==
The NCSF's mission as described on its web page is:

The NCSF is committed to creating a political, legal and social environment in the US that advances equal rights for consenting adults who engage in alternative sexual and relationship expressions. The NCSF aims to advance the rights of, and advocate for consenting adults in the BDSM-Leather-Fetish, Swing, and Polyamory Communities. We pursue our vision through direct services, education, advocacy, and outreach, in conjunction with our partners, to directly benefit these communities.

The NCSF's mission has changed since its founding. In 2002 the rights of swingers, polyamorous people, and some other alternative sexuality groups were added to its mission.

On May 14, 2020, the NCSF Board approved its Diversity and Inclusion Vision:

NCSF's goal is to better fulfill our mission through a better understanding of a diverse range of voices and experiences in our communities. We recognize the similarities and differences between people that make us all unique. We aim to be inclusive by creating opportunities for more people of various backgrounds to be represented and heard by NCSF.

== Programs ==
NCSF's Education Outreach Program provides education for professionals about the BDSM-Leather-Fetish, Swing and Polyamory communities, information for members of the BDSM-Leather-Fetish, Swing and Polyamory communities concerning consent and legal issues that may affect them, and support in the outreach and education efforts of those communities’ groups, clubs and events to local law enforcement, service agencies and authorities.

The Kink And Polyamory Aware Professionals Directory, formerly known as the Kink Aware Professionals list (KAP list), has been maintained by the NCSF since January 2006. It is a directory of professionals who have “volunteered to be available to be contacted by people involved in ‘kinky’ sexuality (leather, BDSM, fetish, polyamory, the Lifestyle, etc.)”

NCSF's Media Outreach Program provides sound bites and tactics for its advocates and allies in dealing with the media. It also regularly provides media training and conducts interviews.

Consent Counts: In 2006, NCSF was part of a leather leadership roundtable at the Creating Change conference that discussed the goals of the BDSM-leather-fetish communities, particularly the decriminalization of BDSM. A subsequent town hall meeting at the Leather Leadership Conference was held to further discuss this goal and to establish an outline for a working plan. In 2007, NCSF took a leadership role in the Consent Counts project.

NCSF's Incident Reporting and Response (IRR) program provides educational resources and referrals to professionals, and tracks the types of requests that are received.

== Research ==
From 2005–2013, NCSF's Incident Reporting & Response program collected reports from constituents that the American Psychiatric Association's Diagnostic and Statistical Manual DSM-IV-TR paraphilias section was being used in criminal and civil proceedings to informally “diagnose” kink-identified individuals as unable to control their behavior and therefore unfit to retain custody of their children. As a first step in de-pathologizing consensual BDSM, NCSF urged that the APA separate sexual behaviors (paraphilias) from the mental disorders (Paraphilic Disorders). The APA's Paraphilias Subworkgroup posted its proposed revisions to the DSM-5 in February 2010, that differentiated consensual paraphilias from paraphilic disorders, and this was largely successful in changing the way BDSM behavior by a parent is considered by family courts during a child custody hearing, typically removing BDSM behavior as a detrimental factor in those cases. As word spread with the publication of the DSM-5 in May 2013, the number of cases reported to NCSF's IRR dropped significantly, from 124 parents reporting issues with child custody in 2008 down to 15 parents in 2017.

NCSF's 1998 Violence & Discrimination Survey documented incidents of discrimination, harassment, and physical attacks against BDSM-identified individuals and BDSM groups: 36% of the respondents reported suffering some kind of violence or harassment because of their BDSM practices, while 30% reported job discrimination.

NCSF's 2015 Psychological Functioning and Violence Victimization and Perpetration survey found that only 9.8% of the 816 respondents stated they are completely open about their involvement in BDSM, while the rest were closeted to varying degrees due to the stigma that is still associated with kink behavior. The majority of participants reported having been victims of violence (26% reported being assaulted while 42% reported being sexually assaulted) but participants themselves were not prone to perpetrating violence, with low rates of aggression proneness, sexual aggression, and endorsement of rape myths. Defined as being a victim of a crime based on actual or perceived BDSM practitioner/kinky status, 7.7% of participants also reported they had been victims of a BDSM-based hate crime.

== Legal ==
Nitke v. Gonzales: On December 11, 2001, the NCSF filed a lawsuit in New York City's federal court with Barbara Nitke, a New York City artist who has been exploring issues of sexual relationship and desire through photography since 1982. This historic lawsuit against The United States of America challenged the constitutionality of the CDA's obscenity statutes on the grounds that they violate the free speech of Internet content providers and inhibit the discussion of sexual issues on the Internet among consenting adults. The attorney for the case is John Wirenius, author of First Amendment, First Principles: Verbal Acts and Freedom of Speech (Holmes & Meier Publishers, Inc., 2000).

United States, Appellee v. Miles: On March 25, 2014, NCSF successfully motioned to file a brief as amicus curiae in support of appellant's petition for grant of review in a military case involving a marine who engaged in what he claimed to be a consensual threesome, and because of that was convicted of adultery, attempted sodomy and indecent conduct, a crime based solely on undefined sexual conduct inconsistent with “common propriety.” NCSF argued in its amicus curiae that the conviction of LCpl Miles for attempted sodomy under Article 134, UMCJ, violated his constitutional liberty as defined by the U.S. Supreme Court in Lawrence v. Texas, and that the UMCJ provisions concerning consensual, non-injurious sexual conduct are inconsistent with current sexual mores in American society. Nevertheless, in an unpublished opinion, the Navy-Marine Corps Court of Criminal Appeals rejected Miles' appeals on August 21, 2014 and affirmed his sentence. The court noted that despite Miles being acquitted of aggravated sexual assault, abusive sexual contact, and wrongful sexual contact, the facts of the case did not support a description of Miles' sexual acts as "consensual".

Woodhull Freedom Foundation et al v. United States: On February 20, 2019, NCSF joined with allies in filing a Brief in Support of Appellants challenging FOSTA, the Allow States and Victims to Fight Online Sex Trafficking Act of 2017.

== Awards ==
In 1999, 2002, 2005, and 2010, NCSF received the Large Nonprofit Organization of the Year award as part of the Pantheon of Leather Awards.

== See also ==
- Woodhull Sexual Freedom Alliance
