= List of BDSM authors =

This is a list of notable authors of fiction and/or non-fiction works about BDSM, including its facets sadomasochism, erotic bondage and domination and submission. For other notable people associated with BDSM, see List of people associated with BDSM.

- Solace Ames, American author of erotic fiction
- Laura Antoniou, writing as Sara Adamson, author of The Marketplace series of novels
- Go Arisue, Japanese bondage artist and author
- Guy Baldwin, psychotherapist and author known for his work on BDSM and sexual related issues
- William Bayer, crime fiction writer who often creates BDSM-oriented characters, and deals with BDSM themes
- Violet Blue, American journalist, author, editor, advisor, and educator
- Gloria Brame, American sexologist, writer and sex therapist
- Rachel Kramer Bussel, American author, columnist, and editor, specializing in erotica
- Patrick Califia, American writer of non-fiction essays about sexuality and of erotic fiction and poetry
- Casey Calvert, American pornographic actress and film director
- Greta Christina, American atheist, blogger, speaker, and author
- David Aaron Clark, American author, musician, pornographic actor, and pornographic video director
- John Cleland, English novelist best known for his fictional Fanny Hill: or, the Memoirs of a Woman of Pleasure
- Oniroku Dan, Japanese author of popular SM novels
- Tess Danesi, American sex educator, blogger, and writer of BDSM erotica
- Tony DeBlase, American leatherman and zoologist, sometimes writing as Fledermaus
- Samuel R. Delany, American author and literary critic
- Anne Desclos, French writer also writing as Dominique Aury and Pauline Réage, author of Story of O
- Vanessa Duriès, French novelist, author of The Ties That Bind
- Dossie Easton, American author and family therapist, author of The Ethical Slut
- Stephen Elliott, author of My Girlfriend Comes to the City and Beats Me Up
- Melissa Febos, American writer, professor and former dominatrix, author of the memoir Whip Smart
- Bob Flanagan, American performance artist and writer known for his work on sadomasochism
- Maîtresse Françoise, also writing as Annick Foucault, French dominatrix and author
- Mary Gaitskill, author of Secretary, short story and origin for same name film
- Stefani Goerlich, American Sexologist and author of The Leather Couch: Clinical Practice with Kinky Clients, The Leather Chair: Culturally Competent Therapy from The Leather Chair, BDSM and Kink: The Basics (with Elyssa Helfer) and With Sprinkles On Top: Everything Vanilla People and Their Kinky Partners Need to Know to Communicate, Explore, and Connect
- Jeff Gord, real name Jeffrey E. Owen, British bondage photographer and writer of erotic fiction
- Matthias T. J. Grimme, German author and publisher of sadomasochistic literature. author of Das SM-Handbuch
- Andrei Gusev, Russian writer and journalist
- Hardy Haberman, American author, filmmaker, educator, and activist
- Laurell K. Hamilton
- Janet Hardy, American writer and sex educator, and founder of Greenery Press
- Lee Harrington, American sexuality and spirituality educator, author, and artist
- Emma Holly, American author who specializes in writing erotic romance novels
- Trevor Jacques, Canadian author, activist, sex researcher, and IT consultant, author of On The Safe Edge: A Manual for SM Play
- Maxim Jakubowski
- Elfriede Jelinek
- V. M. Johnson, American leatherwoman, leather activist and author
- E.L. James, real name Erika Leonard, British author writing as E.L. James, author of Fifty Shades of Grey novels
- Alan Mac Clyde (1930s novelist), pseudonym of unknown author
- Alan Mac Clyde (1950s novelist), pseudonym of unknown author
- Mistress Matisse, American dominatrix
- Malcolm McKesson, American author and outsider artist
- Midori, American bondage artist
- Lord Morpheous, Canadian sex educator, author and photographer
- Charles Allen Moser, American physician, clinical sexologist, sex therapist, and sex educator
- John Norman, real name |John Frederick Lange Jr., American academic and novelist writing as John Norman, author of the Gor series of novels
- Betty Paërl, Dutch mathematician, socialist and transgender rights activist
- John Preston, American author and editor of gay erotica
- Carol Queen, American author, editor, sociologist and sexologist
- Anne Rice, writing as A. N. Roquelaure, author of The Sleeping Beauty Quartet
- Catherine Robbe-Grillet, writing as Jean de Berg and Jeanne de Berg, author of The Image
- Pam Rosenthal, writing as Molly Weatherfield, American author of erotic historical romance novels
- Robert J. Rubel, American author and educational speaker in the field of alternative sexuality
- Gayle Rubin, American cultural anthropologist
- Leopold von Sacher-Masoch, Austrian nobleman, writer and journalist, author of Venus in Furs
- Donatien Alphonse François, Marquis de Sade, French nobleman, author of Justine, or the Misfortunes of Virtue; Juliette, The 120 Days of Sodom and Philosophy in the Bedroom
- Ariel Sands, pseudonymous author of the sadomasochistic novel Never the Face
- Terence Sellers, American dominatrix and writer, author of The Correct Sadist: The Memoirs of Angel Stern
- Elf Sternberg, author of online erotic fiction
- Kitty Stryker, American sex educator and activist
- Gengoroh Tagame, pseudonymous Japanese manga artist
- Cecilia Tan, writer, editor, sexuality activist, and founder of Circlet Press
- Claire Thompson
- Larry Townsend, American author and activist
- Kitty Tsui, American author, poet, actor, and bodybuilder
- Mollena Williams-Haas, American writer, BDSM educator, actress, and former International Ms. Leather
- Jay Wiseman, American BDSM author, educator, and expert witness
