= List of people associated with BDSM =

Here are lists of some notable personalities associated with BDSM, arranged by field of activity. Some people may appear under more than one category.

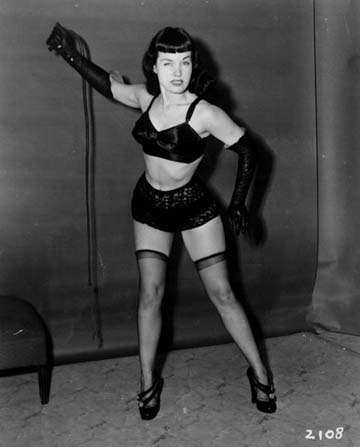
Bettie Page, the first famous bondage model. Picture by Irving Klaw.

== Activists ==
- Patrick Califia
- Viola Johnson
- Jack McGeorge
- Lord Morpheous
- Desmond Ravenstone
- Gayle Rubin
- Cynthia Slater
- Mollena Williams-Haas

== Art ==
- Artists
- Authors
- Photographers

=== Bondage riggers ===
- Go Arisue
- Matthias T. J. Grimme
- Jeff Gord
- Lee Harrington
- Seiu Ito
- Irving Klaw
- Randa Mai
- Midori
- Jay Wiseman

=== Dominatrices ===
- Asa Akira
- Charlotte Bach
- CoCo Brown
- Melissa Febos
- Leslie Fish
- Mistress Matisse
- Domenica Niehoff
- Eva Norvind
- Betty Paërl

=== Filmmakers ===
- Jeff Gord (House of Gord, Naked Gord)
- Peter Acworth (Kink.com, Public Disgrace)

=== Models ===
- Dana DeArmond
- Sharon Kane
- Eri Kikuchi
- Lorelei Lee
- Bettie Page
- Princess Donna
- Madison Young

=== Nikkatsu SM Queens ===
- Junko Mabuki
- Ran Masaki
- Nami Matsukawa
- Izumi Shima
- Miki Takakura
- Naomi Tani

== See also ==
- Significant BDSM people
- BDSM in culture and media
