= Female promiscuity =

Promiscuity among human females

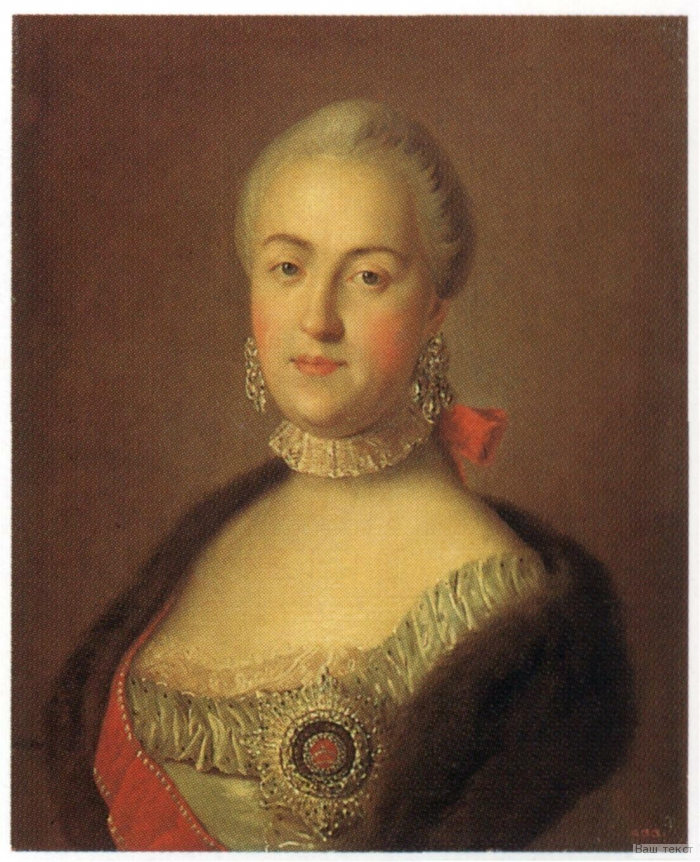
Empress Catherine the Great, a crucial figure at the time of the Enlightenment, is popularly remembered for her promiscuity.

Promiscuity tends to be frowned upon by many societies that expect most members to have committed, long-term relationships. Among women, as well as men, inclination for sex outside committed relationships is correlated with a high libido; however, evolutionary biology, as well as social and cultural factors, have also been observed to influence sexual behavior and opinion.

== Cause ==
Studies have related sociosexual orientation to sex drive, especially in women, where the higher the sex drive the less restricted the sociosexual orientation, or interest in sex outside committed relationships. Nevertheless, pertaining to the nature and nurture debate, there is some data emphasizing cultural factors, more so for women than for men. One review assessed that sociosexuality was affected almost equally by heredity and environment unshared with siblings; shared environment had relatively little effect.

Men tend to have higher sociosexuality scores and be more unrestricted than women across a variety of cultures. However, there is more variability in scores within each gender than between men and women, indicating that although the average man is less restricted than the average woman, individuals may vary in sociosexual orientation regardless of gender.

=== Psychology ===
Body esteem in women showed a significant positive correlation with sociosexual unrestrictedness. So did hip-to-waist ratio and two measures of virilization. Finally, still in the same study, alcohol consumption correlated, too, but it is unclear whether the latter promoted the former or vice versa, or if a third variable was at play.

Bisexual women tend to be less restricted in their sociosexual attitudes than both homo- and heterosexual women. In sociosexual behavior also, bisexual women reported being more unrestricted, followed by homo- and then heterosexual women.

Social power has been popularly associated with sexual infidelity among men; experimental psychologists have linked power with sexual infidelity among women also. A Dutch study involving a large survey of 1,561 professionals, concluded that "The relationship between power and infidelity was the same for women as for men, and for the same reason. These findings suggest that the common assumption (and often-found effect) that women are less likely than men to engage in infidelity is, at least partially, a reflection of traditional gender-based differences in power that exist in society."

Church-attending women score lower on promiscuity than other women, while men appear to lack this correlation.

=== Biology ===
Men and women leading polyandrous lifestyles have higher levels of testosterone. However, it is unclear whether higher levels of testosterone cause increased sex drive and in turn multiple partners or whether sexual activity with multiple partners causes the increase in testosterone. Sociosexuality in women is positively correlated with two measures of prenatal exposure to androgens—right digit ratio, and scores on the Vandenberg Mental Rotation test—providing some limited support to the virilization hypothesis of female promiscuity (see also Prenatal hormones and sexual orientation). The aforementioned hypothesis is not at all mutually exclusive with other hypotheses.

Libido is correlated with the menstrual cycle so that many women experience an increase in sexual desire several days immediately before ovulation. Testosterone levels rise gradually from about the 24th day of a woman's menstrual cycle until ovulation on about the 14th day of the next cycle.

It is common for sex drive to diminish dramatically after menopause. A number of studies, including Alfred Kinsey's, have concluded that the average age group in which women are the most active sexually is their mid-thirties, one study liberally estimating 27–45 as the limits of the age group (the average man peaks later). Women in this age group typically report having sexual fantasies greater in number and intensity, engaging in sexual activity more frequently, and being more interested in casual sex.

One study in sexual antagonism suggested a possible genetic link between female androphilic promiscuity and male androphilia: Samoan tribal women exhibited a correlation between reproductive output and the likeliness of having androphilic grandsons, though not nephews (see also Fa'afafine).

Rate of molecular evolution of the seminal protein gene SEMG2 correlates with levels of female promiscuity.

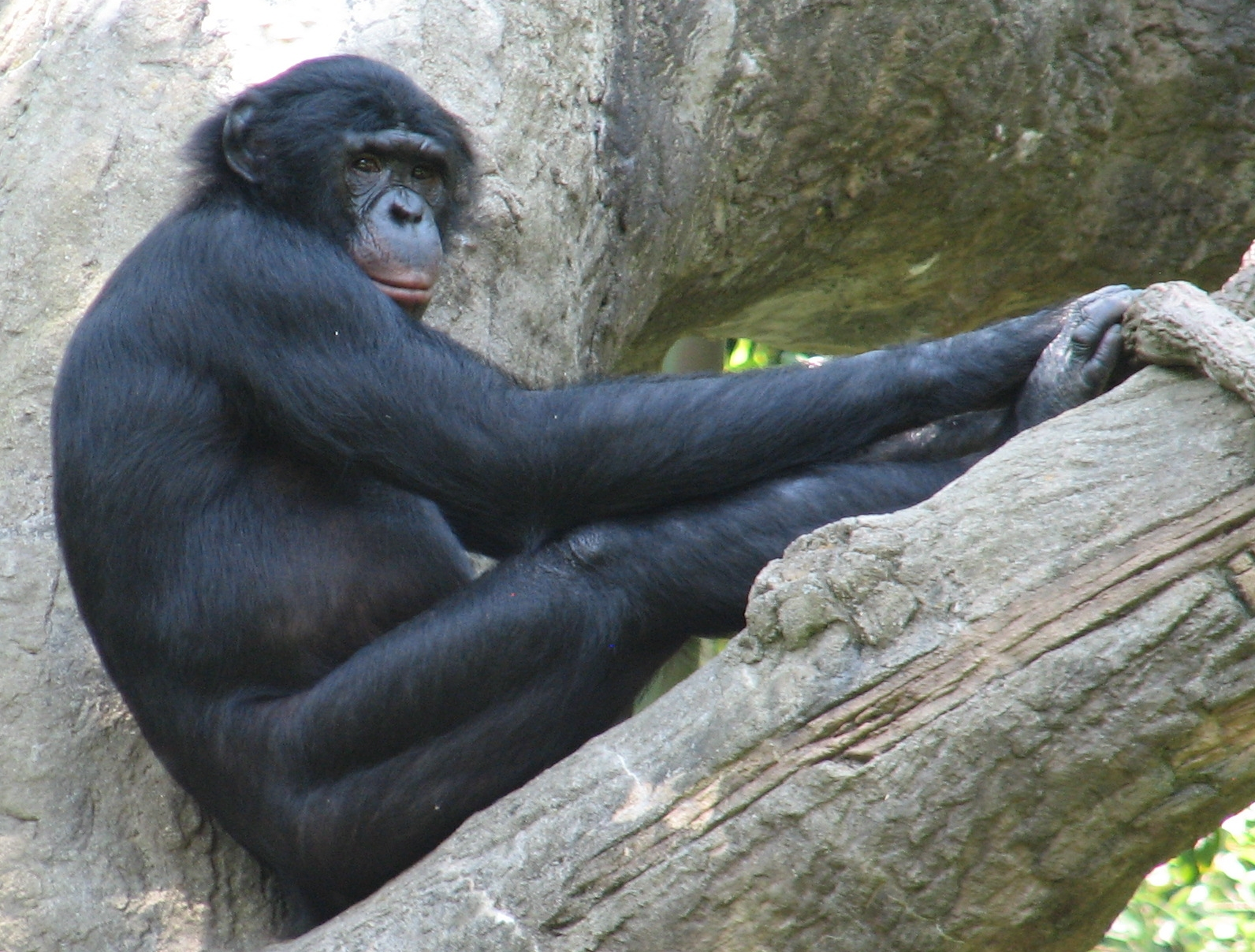
Bonobos treat sexual activity as a very versatile form of social interaction, with purposes ranging from stress reduction to conflict resolution. Females tend to collectively dominate males by forming alliances and use sexuality to control males.

Pathological overactivity of the dopaminergic mesolimbic pathway in the brain—forming either psychiatrically, during mania, or pharmacologically, as a side effect of dopamine agonists, specifically D_{3}-preferring agonists—is associated with various addictions and has been shown to result among some subjects of either sex in overindulgent, sometimes hypersexual, behavior.

==== Evolution ====
Bateman's principle implies that females are choosy because there is little evolutionary advantage for them to mate with multiple males. However, observation of many species, from rabbits to fruit flies, has shown that females have more offspring if they mate with a larger number of males. Exceptions to Bateman's principle abound, as do hypotheses explaining the evolution of female promiscuity. Females in fact have a lot to gain, depending on the species.

Many species once thought monogamous, including such birds as swans, are now known to engage in extra-pair copulation.

Thierry Lodé found possible evolutionary explanations for polyandry relating to sexual conflict, including mate competition and inbreeding avoidance. The following list is incomplete.

- It is easier to ensure reproductive success (i.e., it is more likely that the female will have offspring).
- Females may be encouraging sperm competition between males post-copulation.
- Multiple sperm lines may confer more variation in traits to female's offspring.
- In groups of eusocial taxa, such as beehives, a single female or caste produces offspring while the other organisms cooperate in caring for the young. Bees from different sperm lines excel at different roles within a single hive, benefiting the health of the hive as a whole.
- In tortoise, for example, as a result of clutches with greater variation in paternal genes and increased sperm competition, females can maximize both the genetic quality and number of offspring.
- Those female guppies who mated with a greater number of males in a given cycle, were more likely to bear sons, which in turn had more capacity for reproductive output.
- Females may receive food offerings from prospective mates inciting copulation.
- A female may pursue extra-pair copulation more during fertile periods of her menstrual cycle to conceive from a male with high-quality genes (see Sexy son hypothesis) while relying on resources and paternal investment from her social mate.
- Offspring paternity is unknown and this can be beneficial in encouraging paternal care and discouraging infanticide by males.
- Female extra-pair mating behavior may evolve via indirect selection on males.

== Society and culture ==
Evolutionary psychologists have theorized that taboos against female promiscuity evolved on the basis of paternity anxiety. DNA tests being yet to be invented, it was impossible to accurately determine paternity, unlike maternity. A male risked spending paternal investment on offspring who carried genetic material of another male rather than of his own. Evolutionarily, this translated into sexual jealousy and complex preventive customs (e.g., female genital mutilation, menstrual taboos).

=== Pre-Modern ===
Female promiscuity is a recurring theme in mythologies and religions. In the Middle East, sacred prostitution, usually in honor of Goddess Astarte, had been prevalent before the 4th century when Emperor Constantine I attempted to replace pagan traditions with Christianity. In Greek mythology, nymphs are portrayed as dangerous nature spirits sexually uninhibited with humans; hence, the Victorian medical term nymphomania. Imperial Rome is popularly seen as being sexually profligate, and certain Roman empresses—such as Theodora I, Messalina and Julia the Elder—gained in their lifetime a reputation for extreme promiscuity.

On the field of pleasure she [Empress Theodora] was never defeated. Often she would go picnicking with ten young men or more, in the flower of their strength and virility, and dallied with them all, the whole night through. ... and even thus found no allayment of her craving ... And though she flung wide three gates to the ambassadors of Cupid, she lamented that nature had not similarly unlocked the straits of her bosom, that she might there have contrived a further welcome to his emissaries.

— Procopius, Secret History. Chapter IX: How Theodora, the most depraved of all courtesans, won his love

The Bible features many female personages identified as being promiscuous, among them the Whore of Babylon, Princess Jezebel, Prophetess Jezebel, Gomer, Rahab, Salome, and Potiphar's unnamed wife.

Yet she [Oholibah] became more and more promiscuous as she recalled the days of her youth, when she was a prostitute in Egypt. / There she lusted after her lovers, whose genitals were like those of donkeys and whose emission was like that of horses.

— The Bible (NIV), The Book of Ezekiel XXIII:19–20

=== Modern ===
Many cultures have historically laid much restriction on sexuality, most emphatically against immoderate expression of sexuality by women. In contrast, some recent ethical philosophies—both secular (coming from individualism and sex-positive feminism) and religious (e.g., Wicca, Thelema, LaVeyan Satanism)—either tolerate it or outright celebrate it.

We believe that it is fundamentally a radical political act to deprivatize sex. So much oppression in our culture is based on shame about sex: the oppression of women, of cultural minorities, oppression in the name of the (presumably asexual) family, oppression of sexual minorities. We are all oppressed. We have all been taught, one way or another, that our desires, our bodies, our sexualities, are shameful. What better way to defeat oppression than to get together in communities and celebrate the wonders of sex?

— Dossie Easton, Catherine Liszt, The Ethical Slut. Chapter XXII: Group Sex, Public Sex, Orgies…

Public opinion has fluctuated over the centuries, with such downturns as New England Puritanism (1630–1660) and the Victorian era (1837–1901), when hypersexuality was often treated as an exclusively female disorder, diagnosed on the grounds of as little as masturbation alone (see here). Up until the late 20th century, women could be incarcerated for promiscuous behavior in so-called Magdalene asylums, the last of which was closed in Ireland in 1996. From 1897 to 1958, Ontario used the Female Refuges Act to incarcerate women felt to be "incorrigible".

Following the Industrial Revolution (1760~1840), as Western countries underwent industrialization and urbanization, education and employment opportunities were increasing for women. This environment gave rise in the late 19th century to the feminist ideal called "the New Woman"—a personification of female economic, sexual and other autonomy—which had a profound influence on feminism well into the 20th century. It was not until the Married Women's Property Act 1882 that female British citizens were no longer legally compelled, upon marriage, to transfer all their property to their husbands. The women's movement was closely allied with the free love movement, whose advocates had a strong belief that a woman ought to be herself sovereign over her body.

Laws against adultery [were] based upon the idea that woman is a chattel, so that to make love to a married woman is to deprive the husband of her services. It is the frankest and most crass statement of a slave-situation. To us, every woman ... has ... an absolute right to travel in her own orbit. There is no reason why she should not be the ideal hausfrau, if that chance to be her will. But society has no right to insist upon that standard. It was, for practical reasons, almost necessary to set up such taboos in small communities, savage tribes, where the wife was nothing but a general servant, where the safety of the people depended upon a high birth-rate. But to-day woman is economically independent, becomes more so every year. The result is that she instantly asserts her right to have as many or as few men or babies as she wants or can get; and she defies the world to interfere with her. More power to her!

— Aleister Crowley, The Law is for All, the New Comment 1:41

The Roaring Twenties have been described as "a time when gin was the national drink and sex the national obsession." Popular at that time was a female subculture called "flappers", who flouted social and sexual norms and were considered a significant challenge to Victorian gender roles. But these sentiments were then overshadowed by the Great Depression. Despite this, the 1925 silent film The Red Kimono, sympathetic toward its promiscuous protagonist, was subject to severe censorship, and led to a landmark legal case, Melvin v. Reid.

The 1950s in America is stereotyped to have been sexually repressed, though not as severely as the Victorian era. Female promiscuity in particular became substantially more accepted in Western culture after the sexual revolution of the 1960s, which resonated with the hippie movement. It also became more prevalent a theme in mass media, including cinema (e.g., Sex and the City) and music (e.g., Erotica by Madonna).

Madonna has been at the forefront of the gender neutrality movement in terms of promiscuity since becoming a globally recognized entertainer in the 1980s, singing sexually explicit lyrics, occasionally exposing herself during live performances, and almost being arrested in Toronto, Ontario, Canada, on May 29th, 1990 for simulating masturbation in public. Her book Sex released on October 21st, 1992 was a commercially successful nude pictorial of her and various famous celebrities engaging in scenes of purported promiscuity, further enhancing her vision of gender equality in this regard.

There has been an increase in awareness of discrimination on grounds of promiscuity—apparent or actual—which at least since year 2010 has been called slut shaming. On 3 April 2011, the SlutWalk movement—protesting against explaining or excusing rape by referring to any aspect of a woman's appearance and later, by extension, calling for sexual freedom in general—began in Toronto, Ontario, Canada, and went on to spread throughout the world.

==== Non-Western ====
In the Islamic world, the "Ummah", female promiscuity is a major fear. A woman is obliged, in some countries legally, to wear a veil, such as a burqa or a niqab—in its own right, a symbol of "modesty" and "namus", i.e. female sexual restraint—so as to prevent the woman from having her body visible to any men other than her family or her sole husband.

When a Muslim woman is found to have engaged in extra-marital relations, she falls under the risk of being executed, either by a governmental institution or by natural persons. In the latter case, a common scenario, sometimes even among Muslims residing in Western countries, is family honor killing: the woman's relatives feel that she brought shame on their family, so they resort to homicide as a form of atonement. Otherwise, the woman may be given the penalty of capital punishment by a court, in accordance with the customs of Sharia Islamic law, which is based on the Islamic scriptures of the Quran and on Sunnah. For "zina", adultery, the Quran prescribes flogging 100 times in public; the Sunnah adds stoning ("Rajm") to death if it was extra-marital.

On 20 April 2010, Iranian Islamic cleric Hojatoleslam Kazem Sedighi provoked transnational ridicule by blaming promiscuous women for causing earthquakes. Six days later, on 26 April, the American Boobquake gathering, organized by the blogger Jennifer McCreight and attended by 200,000 participants, was held in response to it.

Japan wasn't as soon to be reached by the sexual revolution, originating in the American 1960s. The documentary Japan – Female Sexuality touched on the subject from a 1990s perspective, and reported the trend to be increasing.

Although polygyny is more common, some tribal societies are traditionally polyandrous.

=== Religious views ===
Fornication generally refers to consensual sexual intercourse between two people who are not married to each other. When a married person has consensual sexual relations with one or more partners whom they are not married to, it is called adultery. John Calvin viewed adultery to be a sexual act that is considered outside of the divine model for sexual intercourse between married individuals, which includes fornication.

For many people, the term carries an overtone of moral or religious disapproval, but the significance of sexual acts to which the term is applied varies between religions, societies, and cultures. In modern usage, the term is often replaced with more judgment-neutral terms such as premarital sex, extramarital sex, or recreational sex.

== Statistics ==
The use of demographical methods in sexological research was pioneered by the American zoologist Alfred Kinsey, who published two books—Sexual Behavior in the Human Male (1948) and Sexual Behavior in the Human Female (1953)—collectively known as the Kinsey Reports. The reports defied the expectations of the public and paved the way for the sexual revolution of the 1960s.

Accurately assessing people's sexual behavior is difficult, since there are strong social and personal motivations, depending on social sanctions and taboos, for either minimizing or exaggerating reported sexual activity. Women tend to undervalue the number of their sex partners whereas men tend to overestimate the number of theirs.

In a 1994 study in the United States, almost all married heterosexual women reported having sexual contact only with their husbands, and unmarried women almost always reported having no more than one sexual partner in the past three months. Lesbians who had a long-term partner reported having fewer outside partners than heterosexual women. More recent research, however, contradicts the assertion that heterosexual women are largely monogamous. A 2002 study estimated that 45% to 55% of married heterosexual women engage in sexual relationships outside their marriage. While the estimates for heterosexual males in the same study were greater (50–60%), the data indicates that a significant portion of married heterosexual women have or have had sexual partners other than their spouse as well.

In Norwegian students, Kennair et al. (2023) found no signs of a sexual double standard in short-term or long-term mating contexts, nor in choosing a friend, except that women's self-stimulation was more acceptable than men's. From a sample of 11 countries across 5 continents, Thomas et al. (2025) also found no signs of a sexual double standard, and that the total number of sexual encounters of a potential long-term partner and the frequency distribution of their new sexual encounters have a significant effect when assesing a potential long-term partner's suitability. Similarly, Stewart-Williams et al. (2016) also found no signs of a sexual double standard regarding long-term relationships, with the effect of past partner number being very large on both genders' psychology.

One international study found women to be more variable than men in their sex drive. International measurements of promiscuity are inconsistent from study to study, varying by the methodology used. Due to practical reason—the inability to survey a country's entire population—all studies of this class are inductive, generalizing about the general population based on assessments of sample groups supposed to be representative of the larger population being studied.

For example, in a non-scientific study conducted by the condom-making company Durex, British women reported fewer partners than British men, while the only country where women reported more sex partners than men did was New Zealand (20.4 versus 16.8), which was also the country where women reported more sex partners than did women from all other countries surveyed. To further complicate matters, a well-known study in general sociosexuality that surveyed 14,059 people across 48 countries, placed New Zealand, which came right before Slovenia, second to Finland; the United States, in the unisex scores of the same study, came in 22nd.

== Terminology ==
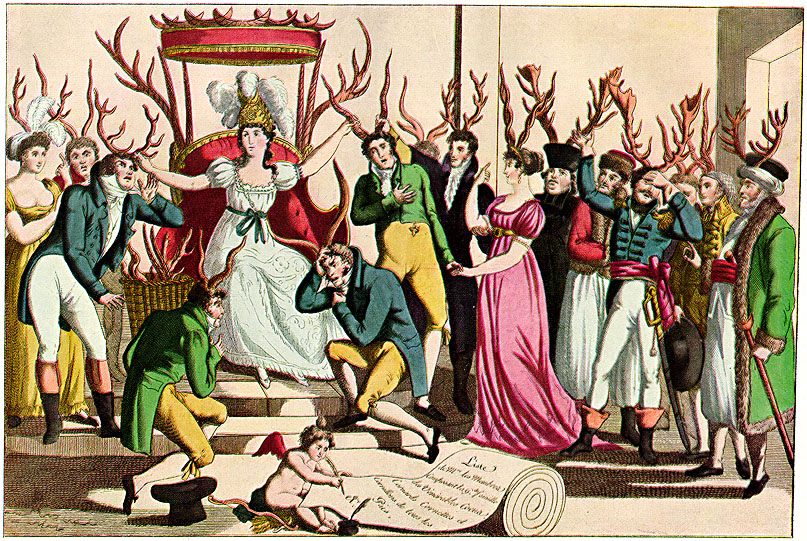
Ca. 1815 French satire on cuckoldry, which shows both men and women wearing horns

Sexual relations with multiple males are termed polyandry. It has a more specific meaning in zoology, where it refers to a type of mating system, and in anthropology, where it refers to a type of marriage. Sexual relations with multiple females are termed polygyny, but in zoology it can only be applied to heterosexual relations. Polyamory is sometimes defined as non-monogamy with consent of all parties involved, if within or without committed relationships. Attitudinal differences concerning sex outside committed relationships are referred to under the term sociosexual orientation or simply sociosexuality.

Since at least 1450, the word slut has been used, often pejoratively, to describe a sexually promiscuous woman. In and before the Elizabethan and Jacobean eras, terms like "strumpet" and "whore" were used to describe women deemed promiscuous, as seen for example in John Webster's 1612 play The White Devil.

Discrimination targeting individuals, specifically women, for sexual behavior deemed excessive, has been referred to, since at least spring of 2010, with the neologism slut shaming (also hyphenated, as slut-shaming).

Cuckold fetish is colloquial for a paraphilia in which sexual gratification is gained from maintenance or observation of sexual relations by a woman with a man or a number of men besides her husband, boyfriend or long-term male sex partner.

The popular slang cougar refers to a woman who seeks sexual relations with considerably younger men.

The term fallen woman was used to describe a woman who has "lost her innocence", and fallen from the grace of God. In Victorian Britain especially, the meaning came to be closely associated with the "loss or surrender of a woman's chastity". Its use was an expression of the belief that to be socially and morally acceptable a women's sexuality and experience should be entirely restricted to marriage, and that she should also be under the supervision and care of an authoritative man.

== See also ==
- Bachelorette party
- Call girl
- Cuckoldry
- Fallen woman
- Female sexuality
- Magdalene asylum
- New Woman
- Non-monogamy
- Nymphomania (defined at Wiktionary)
- Polyamory
- Polyandry
- Promiscuity
- Slut
- Strategic pluralism
