= Mononormativity =

Social assumption of monogamous normativity

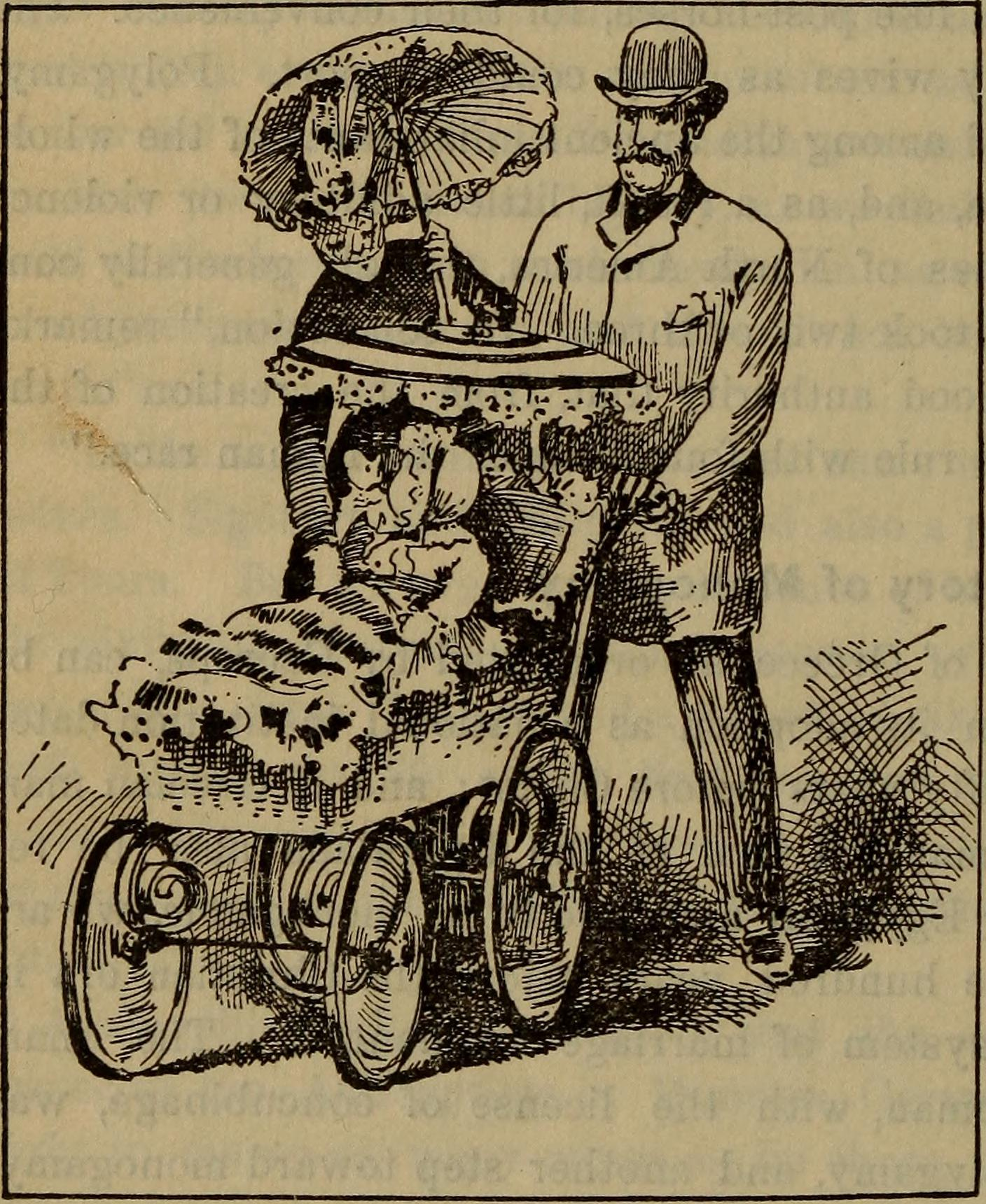
Victorian-era depiction of the nuclear family

Mononormativity or mono-normativity is the normative assumption that monogamy is healthier or more natural than ethical non-monogamy, as well as the societal enforcement of such an assumption. It has been widely tied to various forms of discrimination or bias against polyamory.

The term is also used to instead describe monosexual normativity, akin to monosexism.

== Background ==
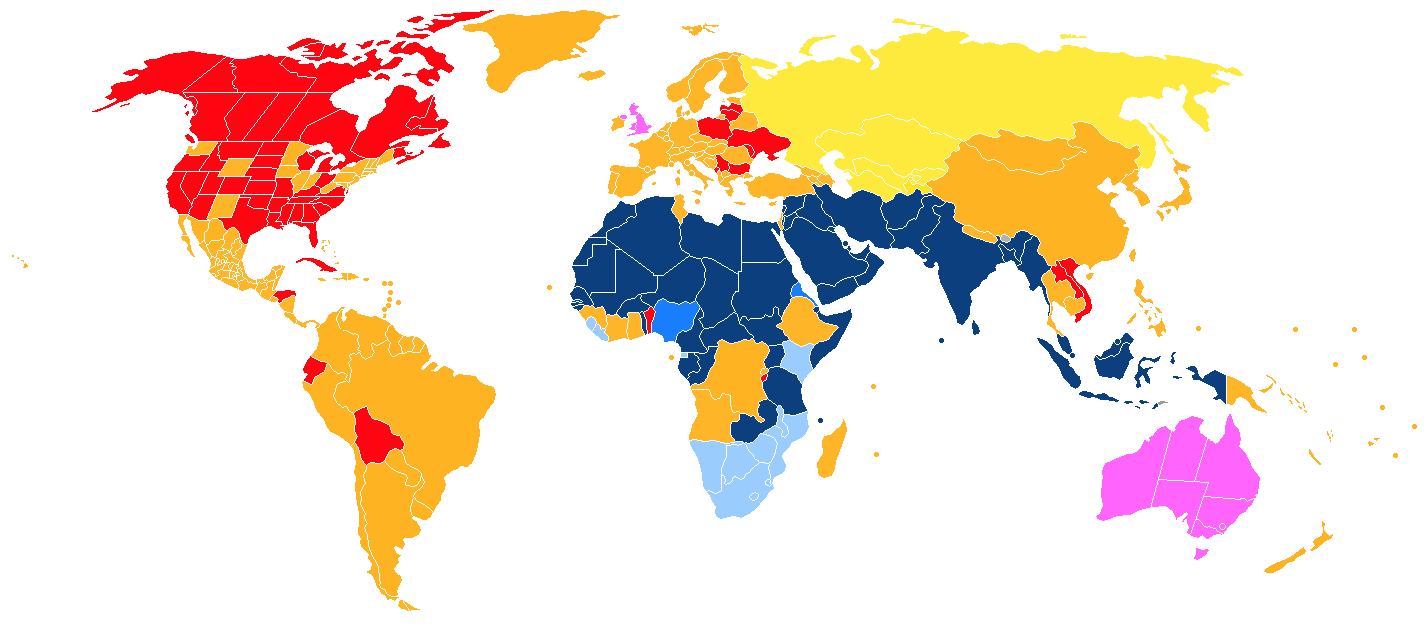
Status of polygamy worldwide Polygamous marriages recognized under civil law Polygamous marriages recognized under civil law in some regions Polygamous marriages performed abroad recognized Customary law recognizes polygamous unions Issue under political consideration No recognition, polygamy legal Polygamy illegal Polygamy illegal, polygamous marriages constitutionally banned

Analysis of monogamy as a social institution dates back to the Nineteenth Century, when works like Lewis H. Morgan's Ancient Society or Frederich Engels' response to the same, titled The Origin of the Family, Private Property and the State, argued that the difficulty of determining patrilineal descent meant that societies under primitive communism likely developed under a matriarchal, non-monogamous social order that was only overturned with the rise of private property and the consequent enforcement of monandry as part of the "world-historic defeat of the female sex".

Morgan's research contrasted the more patriarchal West against indigenous societies like the matrilocal and matrifocal Iroquois, citing the inequality of the former as a consequence of societal developments which "thus reversed the position of the wife and mother in the household; she was of a different gens from her children, as well as her husband; and under monogamy was now isolated from her gentile kindred, living in the separate and exclusive house of her husband."

Polygyny is instead largely culturally unopposed in many regions of Africa and the Muslim world, with the Qur'an providing scriptural basis for a man marrying up to four wives at once as long as he is capable of supporting them.

In the contemporary era non-monogamous couplings are reported to constitute an increasingly significant sexual minority in the developed world. The Kinsey Institute for Research in Sex, Gender and Reproduction estimated that there were half-a-million "openly polyamorous families" in the United States in July 2009. Additionally, 15–28% of heterosexual couples and about half of gay and bisexual people have a "non-traditional" arrangement of some kind as reported in The Guardian in August 2013.

== Mononormative society ==
A large majority of the Western world can be thought of as legally or socially biased towards monogamous ways of living. Feminist scholars Dossie Easton and Janet Hardy explored the consequences of sex-negative, monogamy-centric socialization in their work The Ethical Slut, writing:

How do you dig up and examine a belief that you don’t even know you hold? The idea of lifelong monogamy as the only proper goal for relationships is so deeply buried in our culture that it’s almost invisible, we operate on these beliefs without even knowing we believe them. They are under our feet all the time, the foundation of our assumptions, our values, our desires, our myths, our expectations

"Mononormativity" in the sense of opposition to sexual monogamy was used as early as 1982, defined as "the idea that sexual relations are acceptable when only two people take part, preferably within the confines of a monogamous relationship" in a critique of normative phrasing in the Canadian decriminalization of homosexuality by scholar Thomas Hooper.

"Mono-normativity" in the modern understanding has instead been described as originating in 2005 with German queer studies scholars Marianne Pieper and Robin Bauer, later defined by Bauer as the assumption that "couple-shaped arranged relationships are the principle of social relations per se, an essential foundation of human existence and the elementary, almost natural pattern of living together." The concept has been increasingly cited by psychiatrists and other professionals as a point of concern when countering systemic discrimination and improving legal or social representation for polyamorous people. University of British Columbia professor Carrie Jenkins explored the impacts of mononormativity in a book titled What Love Is: And What It Could Be, later discussing her own identity as polyamorous and drawing a distinction between "pro-polyamory" and "anti-monogamy".

== See also ==
- Amatonormativity – Assumption that everyone prospers with an exclusive, romantic relationship
- Heteronormativity – Concept asserting heterosexuality as the only social norm
- Cisnormativity – Assumption that everyone is cisgender
- Abstinence – Self-enforced restraint from pleasurable activities
- Fourth-wave feminism – Feminist movement, 2010s–present
