= Robert J. Rubel =

American author and educational speaker in the field of alternative sexuality

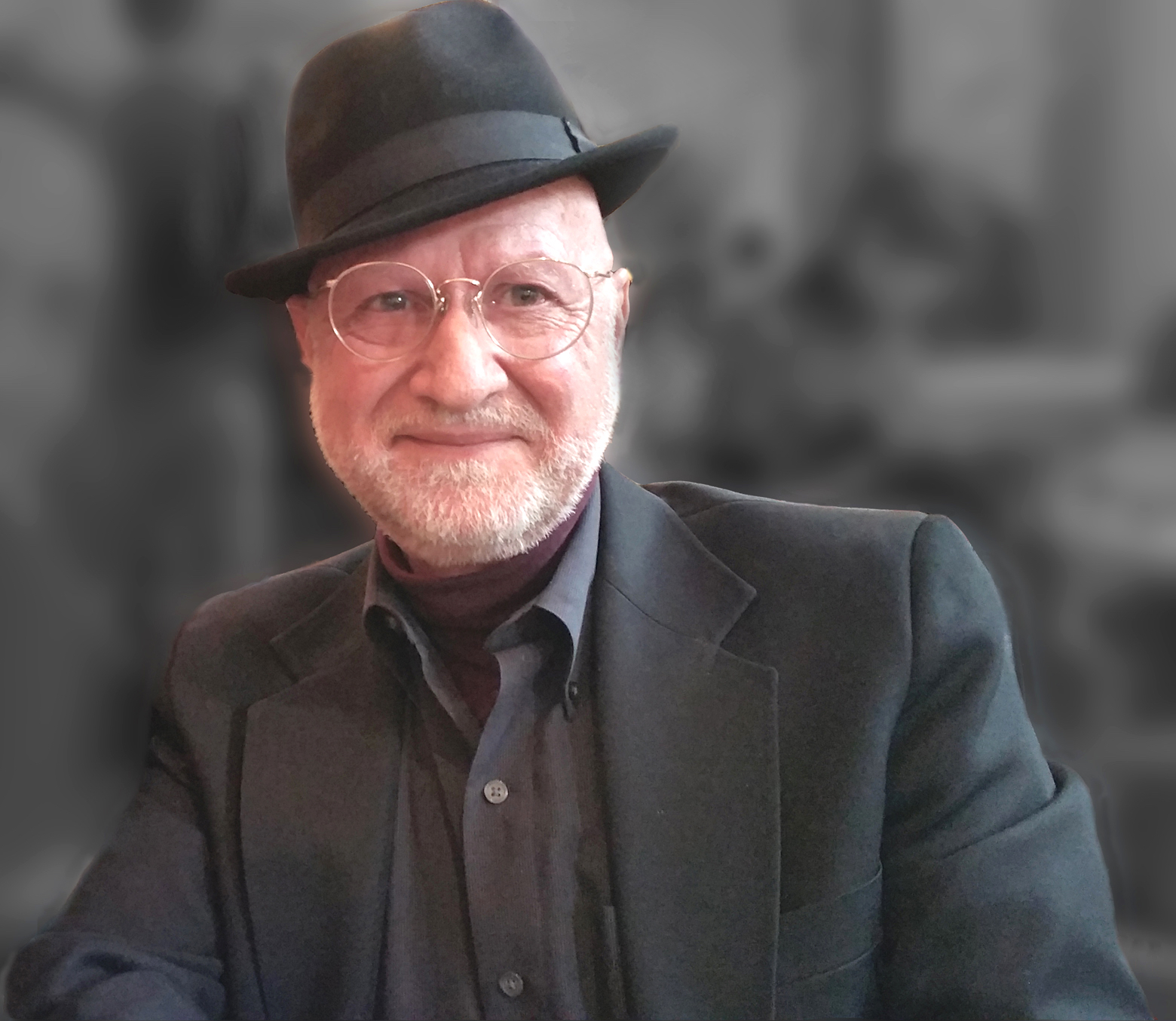
- Rubel in 2010
- Born: October 5, 1944 (age 82); Albany, New York, United States
- Education: Doctorate
- Alma mater: Colorado State University, Boston University, University of Wisconsin
- Occupations: author, educator, photographer
- Father: John H. Rubel

Robert J. Rubel (born Robert Jack Rubel II, October 5, 1944) also known as "Dr. Bob", is an American author and educational sociologist. He specializes in the area of alternative sexuality. He is the author of many books on the subject (see below).

He has been recognized for his work in the realm of alternative sexuality since 2001, and received the 2008 Pantheon of Leather XVIII—Community Choice - Man. More recently, he co-hosts a monthly Zoom room that discusses issues related to M/s theory and practice.

Since 2014, Rubel, has been the lead author for books on communication or Total Power Exchange.

== Education ==
After completing his undergraduate degree at Colorado State University in 1966 he taught English for three years in the Los Angeles Public School System. From teaching, he returned to learning, and enrolled in Boston University where, in 1970 he received a Master's degree. Rubel was accepted into a Ford Foundation sponsored program at the University of Wisconsin's School of Education. He was among 16 graduate students in a program to train to be urban school superintendents. In 1977, Rubel received a doctorate degree in Education with a minor in Criminology. In 1976, Rubel received a visiting fellowship from the National Institute of Justice to document the literature and history of school-based crime and violence.

== Career ==
In 1977, Robert Rubel and Peter Blauvelt founded the National Alliance for Safe Schools (NASS). The NASS did two things: first, it helped school district administrators identify patterns of unwanted behaviors in their secondary schools; second, it helped individual schools or entire districts to modify policies and/or practices to address such behavior.

From 1986 to 1988, Rubel was the Administrator for the American Association of Woodturners.

In 2001, Rubel began researching in the field of alternative sexuality. He wrote a series of books on alternative sexuality, and "authority transfer" dynamics. In 2007, Rubel joined the North American and international lecture circuit, speaking on a variety of topics related to the field of alternative sexuality. From 2007 to 2008, Rubel edited the Power Exchange Books Resource Series and its associated Power Exchange Magazine. In 2009, his book, Squirms, Screams, and Squirts: Handbook for going from great sex to extraordinary sex was picked by Playboy Online as their number one gift book recommendation for Valentine's Day. in 2009, Penthouse Forum mentioned the same book for their 2009 Valentine's issue.

== Awards ==
Rubel was the recipient of the 2008 Pantheon of Leather XVIII—Community Choice - Man.

Rubel was a judge for leather contests and is considered an expert on allexperts.com.

== See also ==
- Guy Baldwin
- Hardy Haberman
- Jack McGeorge
- Jay Wiseman
- Lee Harrington
- Midori (author)

== Bibliography ==
=== Non fiction publications ===
- Rubel, R. and Indigo, The Goddess. (2020) Safe, Sexy and Consensual: Creating Magic in the Dungeon Red Eight Ball Press, Austin. ISBN 978-0-9968795-4-5
- Rubel, R. and Petterson, Veronica.(2020) In One Ear and Out the Other: Essential guide for effective communication Red Eight Ball Press, Austin. ISBN 978-0-9968795-6-9
- Rubel, R. and Fairfield M. (2016) Master/slave Mastery – Protocols: Focusing the intent of your relationship Red Eight Ball Press, Austin ISBN 978-0986352195
- Rubel, R. and Fairfield, M. (2015) Master/slave Mastery – Advanced: Refining the fire: ideas that matter Red Eight Ball Press, Austin ISBN 978-0986352164
- Rubel, R. et al (2014) BDSM Mastery – Basics: your guide to play, parties, and scene protocols Red Eight Ball Press, Austin ISBN 978-0986352102
- Rubel, R. and Fairfield, M. (2014) BDSM Mastery – Relationships: a guide for creating mindful relationships for dominants and submissives Red Eight Ball Press, Austin ISBN 978-0986352126
- Rubel, R. and Fairfield, M. (2014) Master/slave Mastery: Updated handbook of concepts, approaches, and practices Red Eight Ball Press, Austin ISBN 978-0986352119
- Rubel, R. (2010) Squirms, Screams, and Squirts: The Workbook Nazca Plains, Las Vegas ISBN 978-1610981088
- Rubel, R. (2009) Screams of Pleasure: Guide for Extraordinary Sex for those with Erectile Dysfunction Nazca Plains, Las Vegas ISBN 978-1935509004
- Rubel, R. (2007) Protocols: Handbook for the female slave Nazca Plains, Las Vegas, second edition. ISBN 978-1887895125
- Rubel, R. (2007) Master/slave Relations: Communications 401 – The Advanced Course. Nazca Plains, Las Vegas. ASIN: B00IFVA542.
- Rubel, R. (2007) Master/slave Relations: Solutions 402 – Living in Harmony, Las Vegas ASIN: B01K2JNT3S.
- Rubel, R. (2007) Squirms, Screams, and Squirts: Handbook for going from great sex to extraordinary sex Nazca Plains, Las Vegas ISBN 978-1887895644
- Rubel, R. and Walker, David (2006) Flames of Passion: Handbook of Erotic Fire Play, Las Vegas ISBN 978-1425934354
- Rubel, R. (2006) Master/slave Relations: Handbook of Theory and Practice, Las Vegas ISBN 978-1887895163
- Rubel, R. (2006) Parts: The Erotic Photographic Art of Robert J. Rubel, PhD, Las Vegas ISBN 978-0669016680
- Rubel, R. (2006) Wholes: The Erotic Photographic Art of Robert J. Rubel, PhD, Las Vegas ISBN 978-1887895170
- Rubel, R. (2006) Holes: The Erotic Photographic Art of Robert J. Rubel, PhD, Las Vegas ISBN 978-1887895187

=== Power Exchange Books’ Resource Series ===
The first four books in this series consist of nine or ten articles of about 3,500 words each by invited authors. The final book by Lee Harrington is longer.

- Rubel, R. and Stassinopoulas, A. (2007) Playing with Disabilities Las Vegas: Nazca Plains ISBN 978-1934625484
- Rubel, R. and Morgan, L. (2008) Protocols, a Variety of Views Las Vegas: Nazca Plains, ISBN 978-1934625873
- Rubel, R. and Laura, S. (2008) The Art of Slavery Las Vegas: Nazca Plains, ISBN 978-1934625743
- Rubel, R. and Colin (2008) Age Play Las Vegas: Nazca Plains ISBN 978-1934625903
- Rubel, R. and Harrington, L. (2009) Ropes, Bondage, and Power Las Vegas: Nazca Plains ISBN 978-1935509028

=== Power Exchange Magazine ===
From 2007 to 2008, Rubel was the managing editor of Power Exchange Magazine. The publisher, Herbert Moseley, used the author pseudonym "Robert Steele". Nine volumes were published. The volumes included: Master/slave Relations, male Master (2006) ISBN 978-1887895880; Master/slave Relations, female Master (2007)ISBN 978-1887895897; Bootblacking (2007); FemDomme (2007) ISBN 978-1887895910; Pony Play (2007); Polyamory (2007); Daddy/boy (2007); Leather Spirituality (2007); and Pup/Trainer (2007).

=== Publications relating to crime in public schools ===
- Rubel, R. (1990) "Cooperative school system and police responses to high risk and disruptive youth" in Student Discipline Strategies: Research and Practice. Albany, New York: SUNY Press
- Rubel, R. (1987), "Safer schools, better students: toward a systematic approach to addressing serious misbehavior in public schools" in Violence, Aggression and Terrorism 1: p. 81 – 96.
- Rubel, R. (Compiler) (1985) Compendium of Survey Instruments for Evaluating Student, Teacher, and School Victimization by Crime Austin, Texas: National Alliance for Safe Schools.
- Rubel, R. (Ed.) (1985) Guide for Creating School Safety Plans. Examples of Key Directives and Plans Austin, Texas: National Alliance for Safe Schools.
- Rubel, R. (1985) "Enter the security audit" in American School and University p 47 – 48 and 54.
- Rubel, R. (1984) Analyzing School Incidents: A Process Guide Austin, Texas: National Alliance for Safe Schools.
- Rubel, R. (Ed.) (1983) Handbook for Developing Program-Level Impact Evaluations of School Security Programs Austin, Texas: National Alliance for Safe Schools
- Halatyn, T. and Rubel, R. (1982) "Attacking the cause of crime in schools: effect or fallacy?" in Campus Strife vol 2 (summer) p. 2 – 4
- Wayne, I. and Rubel, R. (1982) "Student fear of crime in schools" in Urban Review (fall)
- Rubel, R. (1982) "School crime prevention: NOLPE's Role" in School Law Update Topeka, Kansas: National Organization on Legal Problems of Education
- Rubel, R. (1981), "If I were dictator: how I would reduce crime and violence in schools" Update on Law Related Education (spring) p. 26 – 31
- Wayne, I. Rubel, R. (1981), "Violence is creating apprehensive students" Campus Strife Vol. 3 (summer) p. 26 – 31
- Rubel, R. (1981) "Discipline or prosecute: a matter of definitions" Campus Strife Vol. 4 (winter) p. 10 – 11
- Rubel, R. (1980) "Vandalism: new perspectives provide new insights" in Bulletin of the National Association of Secondary School Principals 64:435 (April) p. 67 – 75
- Rubel, R. (1980) "Extent, perspectives, and consequences of violence in schools" in Violence and Crime in the Schools Lexington, MA: D.C. Heath and Company.
- Rubel, R. et al (1980), "Reflections on the rights of students and the rise of school violence” in Violence and Crime in the Schools Lexington, MA: D.C. Heath and Company.
- Burgan, L. and Rubel, R. (1980) "Public school security, yesterday, today, and tomorrow" in Contemporary Education 52:1 (fall) p. 13 – 17
- Baker, K. and Rubel, R. Violence and Crime in the Schools Lexington, MA: D.C. Heath and Company, ISBN 978-0669033892
- Rubel, R. (1979) "Victimization and fear in public schools: survey of activities" in Victimology V 3:3 and 4 p. 339 – 341.
- Rubel, R. (1979) "The relationship between student victories in the courts and student violence in the schools" in Contemporary Education 50:4 (summer) p. 226 – 230
- Rubel, Robert J. (1978), "Assumptions Underlying Programs Used to Prevent or Reduce Student Violence in Secondary Schools." Theoretical Perspectives on Poverty and School Crime. Springfield, VA: National Technical Information Service: 1239-1265.
- Rubel, R. (1978), "Understanding school-based violence: a litany of issues" School-Law Update Topeka, Kansas: National Organization on Legal Problems of Education 1977 p. 353 – 366
- Rubel, R. (1978) "Violence in public schools: HEW's safe school study" Bulletin of the National Association of Secondary School Principals 62:416 (March) p. 75 – 84
- Rubel, R. (1978) "Analysis and critique of HEW's safe school study" Journal of Crime and Delinquency (July) p. 257 – 265
- Rubel, R. (1978) "What HEW's safe school study means for teachers: findings and implications" American Educator (May) p. 13 – 16
- Rubel, R. (1977) "The unruly school: disorders, disruptions, and crimes" Lexington, Mass.: D.C. Heath and Co. ISBN 978-0669016680
- Rubel, R. (1977) "Student violence and crime in secondary schools from 1950 to 1975: an historical view" Criminal Justice Abstracts 9:4 (December) p. 527 – 542

=== Reports prepared for Federal agencies ===
- Rubel, R. and Ames N. (1986) "Reducing school crime and student misbehavior: a problem solving strategy" Washington, D.C. U.S. Department of Justice, National Institute of Justice
- Rubel, R. (1983) "Crime analysis for schools and school districts: a process guide" Washington, D.C. U.S. Department of Justice, National Institute of Justice
- Rubel, R. (1982) "Policy brief: reducing crime in schools, developing a program of accountability and management of disruptive youth. Washington, D.C. U.S. Department of Justice, National Institute of Justice
- Halatyn, T. and Rubel, R. (1981) "Juvenile crime causes in the public schools: an assessment of the existing research." Sacramento, CA California Commission on Crime Control and Violence Prevention.
- Rubel, R. (Senior compiler) (1979) "School crime and disruption: a selected bibliography" Washington, D.C. U.S. Government Printing Office, National Criminal Justice Reference Service, Law Enforcement Assistance Administration.
- Rubel, R. (1979) "Summary volume: theoretical perspectives on school crime and poverty" Springfield, VA: National Technical Information Service

=== Media Credits ===
- Rubel, R. (2012) Fire Play: A Safety Training Course (70-minute DVD plus 64-page book), Las Vegas: Nazca Plains.
- Rubel, R. (2012) Impact Play 101: Building Your Skills (70-minute DVD plus 48-page book), Las Vegas: Nazca Plains.

== Contributions ==
Raven Kaldera (2014), Paradigms of Power: Styles of Master/Slave Relationships. MA: Alfred Press, ISBN 9781312474697
