= More Than Two =

Non-fiction book by Franklin Veaux, Eve Rickert and Andrea Zanin

- Cover of the first edition
- Author: 1st ed. Franklin Veaux, Eve Rickert; 2nd ed. Eve Rickert, Andrea Zanin
- Cover artist: 1st ed. Paul Mendoza; 2nd ed. Eugenia Zoloto
- Language: English
- Series: More Than Two Essentials
- Subject: Polyamory, open relationships, human sexuality
- Published: 1st ed. 2014 (Thorntree Press); 2nd ed. 2024 (Thornapple Press)
- Publication place: 1st ed. USA; 2nd ed. Canada
- Media type: Print (hardback, paperback, & audiobook)
- Pages: 496
- ISBN: 978-0-9913997-0-3

More Than Two is a non-fiction book about consensual non-monogamous relationships. The first edition, More Than Two: A Practical Guide to Ethical Polyamory, written by Franklin Veaux and Eve Rickert, was published in 2014 by Thorntree Press, a publishing company founded by the authors. It included a foreword by Janet Hardy, co-author of The Ethical Slut. A new foreword by Jessica Fern, author of Polysecure, was added to the eighth printing in 2022. In February 2024, Rickert announced that she had acquired the rights to the book and that a new edition, More Than Two, Second Edition: Cultivating Nonmonogamous Relationships with Kindness and Integrity, written with co-author Andrea Zanin, would be published September of that year by her publishing company, Thornapple Press.

The book shares the same name as, but no content with, Veaux's website MoreThanTwo.com, which he launched in 1997 under the name Xeromag as a resource about polyamory, and with Rickert's website MoreThanTwo.ca. "More Than Two" is also the name of a series of books on consensual nonmonogamy curated by Rickert and published by Thornapple Press. Thornapple Press holds trademarks in the name. In January 2023, the Relationship Bill of Rights from More Than Two was released into the public domain.

== Reception ==
The first edition of More Than Two received positive reviews within polyamorous communities upon publication. The book was a finalist in the Family & Relationships category for the 2014 Indiefab Awards (later rebranded as the Foreword INDIES).

The second edition received a positive review from Kirkus Reviews, along with numerous endorsements from authors and others working in fields that intersect with nonmonogamous issues.

== Criticism of first edition ==
In 2019, a group of people including seven of Veaux's former partners, including More Than Two co-author Rickert and three of the women whom Veaux had told personal stories about in the first edition of More Than Two and in Veaux's memoir, The Game Changer, went public describing abusive and harmful behaviors from Veaux over the course of their relationships with him. The accusations led to a critical analysis of both books by author Kali Tal, who has published extensively regarding psychological trauma.

Rickert published a re-analysis of parts of More Than Two on her own blog, explaining how she had come to understand how some ideas within the book had developed from dysfunctional aspects of her relationship with Veaux. In the second of these analyses, she referenced another essay about an abusive polyamorous relationship that described how some unspecified, popular polyamory guides had been used to support abuse.
