= Danesi =

Danesi is a surname. Notable people with the surname include:

- Anna Danesi, Italian female volleyball player
- Bryan Danesi, Chilean footballer
- Fabien Danesi, French art historian, lecturer in theory and practice of photography
- Marcel Danesi, current Professor of Semiotics and Linguistic Anthropology at the University of Toronto
- Tess Danesi, American sex educator, blogger, and writer of BDSM erotica
