= List of BDSM photographers =

This is a list of notable photographers in the field of BDSM. For other notable people associated with BDSM, see List of people associated with BDSM.

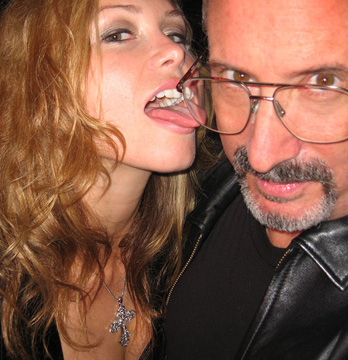
Ken Marcus with Heather Vandeven at AVN Awards Show

- Jeff Gord (1946–2013)
- Charles Guyette (1902–1976)
- Eric Kroll (born 1946)
- Robert Mapplethorpe (1946–1989)
- Ken Marcus (born 1946)
- Fakir Musafar (1930–2018)
- Helmut Newton (1920–2004)
- Barbara Nitke (born 1950)
- Roy Stuart (born 1962)
