= Southeast Leatherfest =

Annual fetish event in Atlanta, Georgia, U.S.

SouthEast LeatherFest (SELF) is an annual adult fetish event for the BDSM, leather, and kink communities, serving as an educational, social, and fundraising event. It is based in Atlanta, Georgia, in the Southeastern United States, with regional and smaller related events held throughout the year. It is held in June, which is pride month in the U.S., and attended by LGBTQ and allied adults.

== History ==
SouthEast LeatherFest (SELF) was started in 1995 by Jack Stice, International Master 1995. It was conceptualized as a BDSM, Master/slave event to welcome all sections of the SM communities, with particular emphasis on the leather subculture. Modeled after International Mister Leather and Drummer, SELF added classes to this model. It began as a 2.5 day event with a bar crawl Friday evening and classes hosted on Saturday. Since 1995, SELF has been one of the largest sex education and BDSM education events in the southeastern region of the United States, openly supporting underground kink, fetish, BDSM, sex-positive, Master/slave, and Dominance/submission communities.

This event was one of the first in Atlanta history that brought straight and LGBTQIA+ communities together. This type of collaboration had not previously happened at BDSM and Master/slave events in the area. While there had been some events in the region that were specifically for gay men, this was the first event to have all communities present. SELF is a charitable event that has donated an estimated $290,000 to charities and scholarships over the years. Some of these charities include the Leather Archives & Museum, National Coalition for Sexual Freedom, Susan G. Komen for the Cure, and the Carter/Johnson Library. Jack Stice was the founder of this event and the "Jack Stice Memorial Community Service Award" was given in his honor annually.

SouthEast LeatherFest holds classes given by nationally known educators from across the country, holds multiple spokesperson contests, and has various other activities that promote community and pride. SELF spokesperson titles are referred to as Mr. SouthEast LeatherFest, Ms. SouthEast LeatherFest, SouthEast LeatherFest boy, Southeast Bootblack, Southeast Person of Leather, and SouthEast Master/slave, and until 2001 it was the home of the International Master and slave contest and a number of titles.

Lady Catherine G. has worked in various capacities on the event since the 1990s and produced SELF since 2004. She has led the organization to expand its educational and social offerings. SELF, as of 2023, offers more than 200 educational and social opportunities over four days. SELF is attended by over 850 persons per year.

SELF ran a mini-grant program from 2007 to 2011 to invest regional money into local groups by funding speakers and educators to be brought to local communities that might not be able to afford it otherwise.

SELF was nominated for "Pantheon of Leather Large Event of the Year" in 2005–2007 which means that this event stood out from the other 100 events though independent peer review to be noted as one of five events that has been providing outstanding community service.

In 2014, SELF became the first leather contest in the country where a portion of each title contest was digital voting by the weekend participants. This practice continues today.

SELF was not held in person in 2020 or 2021 due to the COVID-19 pandemic; it returned to in-person events in 2022.

SELF has been reviewed and has supported the Leather Archives and Museum, a library/museum/archives pertaining to Leather sub culture, fetishism, Sadomasochism, and alternative sexual practices. The geographic collection scope is worldwide and includes all sexual orientations and genders. SouthEast LeatherFest is owned and produced by Catherine Gross. It is administered by a board of volunteers annually.

== Titleholders ==
=== 2025 ===
- Mr SouthEast Leather Fest -- Sir Andrew
- Ms SouthEast Leather Fest -- Amethyst "baby" glaze
- SouthEast BootBlack -- Dakota
- SouthEast Person of Leather - girlBettie
- SouthEast Leather Fest boy - Terrell
- SouthEast Master/slave -- Master Aaron and slave jennie

=== 2024 ===
- Mr SouthEast Leather Fest -- Sir Andrew
- Ms SouthEast Leather Fest -- Ms. Sabrina Hypnotica
- SouthEast BootBlack -- Keriis
- SouthEast Master/slave -- Master Aaron and slave jennie

=== 2023 ===
- Mr SouthEast Leather Fest -- MaxInLeather
- Ms SouthEast Leather Fest -- Scarlett Rose
- SouthEast BootBlack -- Apollo
- SouthEast Person of Leather -- Mara
- SouthEast Master/slave -- Master Varii and slave neill

=== 2022 ===
- Mr SouthEast Leather Fest -- MaxInLeather
- Ms SouthEast Leather Fest -- Ms. Mia Rose
- SouthEast BootBlack -- Apollo
- SouthEast Master/slave -- Master Varii and slave neill

=== 2019-2021 ===
- Ms SouthEast Leather Fest -- Choc Trei [stepped down on December 31, 2020]
- Southeast BootBlack -- Mycalyne
- SouthEast Person of Leather -- Idris Dior
- SouthEast Leather Fest boy -- Quazi
- SouthEast Master/slave -- Sir Luke and His victor

=== 2018 ===
- Mr SouthEast Leather Fest -- Sir Bradford
- Ms SouthEast Leather Fest -- Choc Trei
- SouthEast BootBlack -- Tidbit
- SouthEast Person of Leather -- Iamar Kinhawk
- SouthEast Leather boy -- Quazi
- SouthEast Master/slave -- Master Blue and slave Sheri

=== 2017 ===
- Ms SouthEast Leather Fest -- Tig
- SouthEast BootBlack -- Coco
- SouthEast Person of Leather -- ABizzy
- SouthEast Master/slave -- Master IceDog and slave Ravyn

=== 2016 ===
- Ms SouthEast Leather Fest -- Tig
- Mr SouthEast Leather Fest -- Timothy Lee
- Southeast BootBlack -- Ms Tori
- SouthEast Person of Leather -- ABizzy
- SouthEast Master/slave -- Master Bella and slave Rooks

=== 2015 ===
- Ms SouthEast Leather Fest -- Jennifer Deese
- Mr SouthEast Leather Fest -- Timothy Lee
- Southeast BootBlack -- Friday
- SouthEast Person of Leather -- Autumn East

=== 2014 ===
- Ms SouthEast Leather Fest -- slave Pat
- Southeast Master/slave -- Kevin & slave Feyrie

=== 2013 ===
- Mr. SouthEast Leather Fest -- Optimus
- Ms. SouthEast Leather Fest -- Flossie
- SE BootBlack -- Madeline Sparkles
- SouthEast Leather Fest boy -- boy River

=== 2012 ===
- Mr SouthEast Leather Fest -- OB
- SouthEast Leather Fest boy -- boy Andy

=== 2011 ===
- Mr SouthEast Leather Fest -- Ejay
- Ms SouthEast Leather Fest -- Angel Propps
- SE BootBlack -- boy Dave
- SE Master/slave -- Master Dan and slave Melissa

=== 2010 ===
- Mr SouthEast Leather Fest -- Phantom Blue
- Ms SouthEast Leather Fest -- Amber
- SE BootBlack -- Margaret
- SE Master/slave -- Master Rick and slave Gypsie

=== 2009 ===
- Mr SouthEast Leather Fest -- Nefarious
- Ms SouthEast Leather Fest -- Miss Rae
- SE BootBlack -- Margaret
- SE Master/slave -- Master Tom and slave Linda

=== 2008 ===
- Mr SouthEast Leather Fest -- Henry Loyd
- Ms SouthEast Leather Fest -- Miss Bettie
- SE BootBlack -- Girl Commando/boy Andy

=== 2007 ===
- Ms SouthEast Leather Fest -- Solitaire
- SouthEast BootBlack -- Q
- SouthEast Master/slave -- Sir Top and slave Bonnie

=== 2006 ===
- International Master and slave -- Mistress Susan and slave Ziggy (Teagan)
- Ms SouthEast Leather Fest -- Solitaire
- Mr SouthEast Leather Fest -- Matthew Cary

=== 2005 ===
- SouthEast Master/slave -- Master Tom and slave Linda
- SouthEast LeatherFest Boy -- Boy Tala

=== 2004 ===
- Ms SouthEast Leather Fest -- Girl Kim
- SouthEast Leather Fest Boy -- Grant Lam

=== 2003 ===
- SouthEast Leather Sir -- Richard Gray
- SouthEast Leatherboy -- Michael Waugh
- Ms Leather Pride -- JD

=== 2002 ===
- International Master/slave -- Master Scott and Slavette
- Ms Leather Pride -- Chance
- SouthEast Leather Sir -- John Derrek
- SouthEast Leatherboy -- John Mark

=== 2001 ===
- International Master/slave -- Master Jim and slave Marshal
- SouthEast Mr Drummer -- Daryl Fox
- SouthEast Drummer Boy -- Paul Ferreira
- Ms Leather Pride -- Chance

=== 2000 ===
- International Master/slave -- Steve Sampson and Kirk
- SouthEast Mr Drummer -- Larry Cottrill
- SouthEast Drummer Boy -- Bruce Tidwell
- Ms Leather Pride -- Samantha Claar

=== 1999 ===
- International Master/slave -- Khiki Cavannarro and Samantha
- Ms Leather Pride -- Paula Smith
- SouthEast Mr Drummer -- Shawn Couch
- SouthEast Drummer boy -- Boy Chris

=== 1998 ===
- Ms Leather Pride -- Sybil King
- SouthEast Mr Drummer -- Tom Stice
- SouthEast Drummer boy -- Gregory Kornman

=== 1997 ===
- SouthEast Mr Drummer-- Martin Ellis
- Ms Leather Pride -- Victoria Gayton (Ameritus Award)
- SouthEast Drummer boy -- Boy Von Sumrall
- Mr. Georgia Leather -- Joseph Blair
- Ms. Georgia Leather -- Miss Patt

=== 1996 ===
- SouthEast Mr Drummer -- Bob Jacobs Harris
- SouthEast Drummer boy -- Rory Teasdale
- Mr. Georgia Leather -- Leonard Sewell
- Ms. Georgia Leather -- Khiki Cavannarro

=== 1995 ===
- SouthEast Mr Drummer -- Ricardo A M Ware
- SouthEast Drummer boy -- Patrick Langone

=== 1994 ===
- SouthEast Mr Drummer -- Kevin Drewery
- SouthEast Drummer boy -- Dale Calloway

=== 1993 ===
- Mr. SouthEast Leather -- Darryl Flick
- Mr. SouthEast Drummer -- Barry Bishop
- SouthEast Drummer boy -- Owen Griswold

=== 1992 ===
- Mr. SouthEast Leather -- Kevin Drewery
- Mr. SouthEast Drummer -- Bart Girton
- SouthEast Drummer boy -- Eric Hayes

=== 1991 ===
- Mr. SouthEast Leather -- Wes Decker
- Ms. SouthEast Leather -- MP Breslin
- Mr. SouthEast Drummer -- Vance Reger

=== 1990 ===
- Mr. SouthEast Leather -- Chuck Higgins
- Ms. SouthEast Leather -- Diane Suissa
- Mr. SouthEast Drummer -- Bernhard Zinkgraf
- SouthEast Drummer boy -- Michael Feinstein

== See also ==
- Atlanta Eagle
- Hardy Haberman
