= Fabien Danesi =

Fabien Danesi is a Doctor of Art History from the Panthéon-Sorbonne University, with a thesis defended in 2002 under the supervision of Philippe Dagen, titled "The Ambivalence of the Ready-Made in the Postmodern Era". A former resident of the Villa Medici - French Academy in Rome during 2007-2008, he previously taught at the François-Rabelais University of Tours, Paris 13 University, Panthéon-Sorbonne University, and the University of Versailles-Saint-Quentin-en-Yvelines. From 2008 to 2021, he was an associate professor of visual arts at the University of Picardie Jules Verne in Amiens.

A member of the International Association of Art Critics-France, he was in charge from September 2014 to June 2017 of the program at the Pavillon Neuflize OBC, a creative laboratory at the Palais de Tokyo. He then co-curated two exhibitions at the Palais de Tokyo and managed the artistic programming of the Casa Conti - Ange Leccia in Oletta. Since October 2021, he has been the director of FRAC Corsica, a cultural institution of the Corsican Community. Since March 2025, he has served as copresident of Platform, the association that brings together all the FRAC's.

== Curating ==
1 - The Fourth Dimension. Onomichi Museum City of Art, November 22, 2014 - January 12, 2015. Exhibition of artists from the Pavillon, the creative laboratory of the Palais de Tokyo. Guest artists: Basma Alsharif, Charbel-Joseph H Boutros, Aung Ko, Jonathan Martin, Shelly Nadashi, Keishiro Shibuya.

2 - At Night, the Molecules, the Horizon. Exhibition at FRAC Corsica, May 29, 2015 - October 30, 2015. Exhibited artists: Boris Achour, Dennis Adams, Daniel Bosser, Stephen Dean, Mimosa Echard, Hakima El Djoudi, Sylvie Fanchon, Alicia Framis, Rodney Graham, (IFP), Gérard Koch & Pascal Alessandri, Ange Leccia, Gabriel Orozco, Présence Panchounette, Gaël Peltier, David Raffini, Bernhard Rüdiger, Claude Rutault, and Franck Scurti. Eponymous catalogue published for the occasion: "At Night, the Molecules, the Horizon". Works from the collection of FRAC Corsica, Milan, Silvana Editoriale, 2015, 64 pages.

3 - Hallucination(s), exhibition at Casa Conti - Ange Leccia, Oletta, July 14 - September 30, 2015. Exhibited artists: Trisha Baga, Mélissa Epaminondi, Dominique Gonzalez-Foerster, Ange Leccia, and Ben Russell.

4 - Urban Legends. Exhibition at the Seoul Museum of Modern Art (SeMA), April 5, 2016 - May 31, 2016. Exhibited artists: Alexis Guillier, Hoël Duret, Jean-Alain Corre, Lou Lim, Ollie Palmer, Ayoung Kim, and Ange Leccia.

5 - Offside. Contemporary art and football, Casa Conti - Ange Leccia, Oletta, July 30 - September 30, 2016. Exhibited artists: Stephen Dean, Laurent Grasso, Ange Leccia, Jacques Tati, Jean-Philippe Toussaint, and Apichatpong Weerasethakul.

6 - Prec(ar)ious Collectives. 23 Academia Street, Athens, April 6 - 12, 2017. Exhibition of artists from the Pavillon, a creative laboratory of the Palais de Tokyo, parallel to Documenta 14. Exhibited artists: Manolis Daskalakis-Lemos, Lola Gonzàlez, Taloi Havini, Yu Ji, Wataru Tominaga, and Thomas Teurlai.

7 - Playlist, Casa Conti - Ange Leccia, Oletta, July - September 2017. Exhibited artists: Aurélien Froment, Ange Leccia, Laina Lertxundi, Angelica Mesiti, and Julien Perez.

8 - The Dialectic of the Stars, Festival in Los Angeles from February 11 to 25, 2018 as part of the residency of the FLAX Foundation (France Los Angeles Exchange). Exhibited artists: Scoli Acosta, Jasmin Blasco, Fouad Bouchoucha, Bertrand Dezoteux, Lucky Dragons, Hoël Duret, Naotaka Hiro, Robert Karimi, Ange Leccia, Rafaela Lopez, Emily Mast, Arash Nassiri, Alison O'Daniel, Assaf Shaham, Geneva Skeen, and Noé Soulier.

9 - The Dialectic of the Stars. Extinction Dancefloor, Platform-L. Seoul, April 5 - June 30, 2018. Guest artists: Onejoon Che, Jochen Dehn, Olivier Dollinger, Mimosa Echard, Pierre Gaignard, Lola Gonzàlez, Daiga Grantina, YoungZoo Im, Bona Park, Arash Nassiri, and Pepo Salazar.

10 - Ana Vaz. The Voyage Out, Casa Conti - Ange Leccia, July 18 - September 30, 2018.

11 - I did an exhibition in my house nobody came, Private apartment, Paris, October 18 - November 17, 2018.

12 - Prince.sse.s of the cities, Palais de Tokyo, Paris, June 21 - September 8, 2019, associate curator. Curator: Hugo Vitrani. Exhibited artists: Aderemi Adegbite, Shishir Bhattacharjee, Biquini Wax, Chelsea Culprit, Ndidi Dike, Ema Edosio, Kadara Enyeasi, Falz, Dex Fernandez, Dina Gadia, Ha.Mü, Amir Kamand, Farrokh Madhavi, Maine Magno, Pow Martinez, Leeroy New, Emeka Ogboh, Wura-Natasha Ogunji, Adeola Olagunju, Ashfika Rahman, Mahbubur Rahman, Fernando Palma Rodriguez, John Jayvee del Rosario, Barbara Sanchez-Kane, Mamali Shafahi, Reza Shafahi, Justin Shoulder, Mohammad Shoyeb, Manuel Solano, Newsha Tavakolian, Stephen Tayo, Tercerunquinto, Timmy Harn, Traición Maria, Jeona Zoleta Zombra... + Lulu (Chris Sharp, Martin Soto Climent and their artists).

13 - Voiceless, Casa Conti - Ange Leccia, Oletta, Corsica, July 26 - September 30, 2019. Exhibited artists: Ange Leccia, Marianna Simnett, Newsha Tavakolian, Marie Voignier, and Yuyan Wang.

14 - Our World is Burning, Palais de Tokyo, Paris, February 21 - June 17, 2020, associate curator. Curator: Abdellah Karroum. Exhibited artists: John Akomfrah, Mustapha Akrim, Francis Alÿs, Kader Attia, Mounira Al Solh, Bouthayna Al Muftah, Monira Al Qadiri, Sophia Al Maria, Sammy Baloji, Yto Barrada, Aslı Çavuşoğlu, Faraj Daham, Bady Dalloul, Inji Efflatoun, Khalil El Ghrib, Mounir Fatmi, Fabrice Hyber, Dominique Hurth, Amal Kenawy, Amina Menia, Shirin Neshat, Otobong Nkanga, Sara O’Haddou, Michael Rakowitz, Younes Rahmoun, Wael Shawky, Oriol Vilanova, Danh Vo, Raqs Media Collective.

15 - The Secrets of Alidades, Jeddah, Saudi Arabia, July 8 - September 7, 2021. Exhibited artists: Qamar Abdulmalik, Sarah Abu Abdullah, Alia Ahmad, Eijia-Liisa Ahtila, Ahaad Alamoudi, Rajaa Alhajj, Moath Alofi, Bashaer Alhawsawi, Nasser Almulhim, Zahiyah Alraddadi, Nasser Alsalem, Mohamed Alsanie, Zena Amir, Dana Awartani, Asaad Badawi, Philippe Baudelocque, Hicham Berrada, Asma Bahmim, Sarah Brahim, Zahra Bundakji, Basma Felemban, Fabrice Hyber, Aisha Islam, Ammar Jiman, Zeyn Joukhadar, Ange Leccia, Sarah Ouhaddou, Agnieszka Polska, Matteo Rubbi, Anhar Salem, Yasmeen Sudairy, Sarah Taibah, Esther Teichmann, and Ayman Zedani.

16 - I’ve seen things you people wouldn’t believe, FRAC Corsica, Corti, November 5, 2021 - February 28, 2022. Exhibited artists: Jean-Marie Appriou, Guillaume Aubry, David de Beyter, Salomé Chatriot, Caroline Corbasson, Bill Culbert, Roland Flexner, Cyrielle Gulacsy, Agata Ingarden, Théo Massoulier, Marylène Negro, Josèfa Ntjam, Bruno Peinado, Agnieszka Polska, Florian and Michael Quistrebert, Keith Sonnier, Tatiana Wolska.

17 - The Atlas of Wonders. Zeyn Joukhadar & Matteo Rubbi, FRAC Corsica, Corti, March 18 - June 18, 2022.

18 - Slow Passions. Pauline Curnier Jardin, FRAC Corsica, Corti, November 5, 2022 - March 23, 2023.

19 - I Want What I Want. Ange Leccia, FRAC Corsica, Corti, July 1 - October 21, 2023.

20 - The Land of the Commune, FRAC Corsica, Corti, November 9, 2023 - March 21, 2024. Exhibited artists: Amandine Joset-Battini, Flo*Souad Benaddi, Toni Casalonga, Aurélie Ferruel and Florentine Guédon, Marcos Ávila Forero, Asunción Molinos Gordo, Hendrik Hegray, Judith Hopf, Suzanne Husky, Nicolas Momein, Gyan Panchal, Anna Reutinger, Rémi Voche, and Jean -Philippe Volonter.

21 - Where an Island Begins. Jordi Colomer, FRAC Corsica, April 9 - June 15, 2024.

22 - Art & Sport, May - October 2024, 13 exhibitions - 13 sports sites or events. Organized by the Grand PalaisRMN. Works from the collections of the 22 FRACs. A - Hand in Hand in Hand (touch), House of Sports in Nevers, May 5 - June 2. Exhibited artists: Cool Balducci, Monica Bonvicini, Claude Closky, Edith Dekyndt, David de Tscharner, Antoni Muntadas, Ed Pien, Su-Mei Tsé, and Elsa Werth. B - The Dreamers at the Lantern (neon), Congress Center of Saint-Brieuc, 26th National Games of Future Handisport, May 8 - 12. Exhibited artists: Boris Achour, Michel François, François Morellet, and Arno Piroud. C - Pop Up Play Polychrome (multicolor), Mulhouse Climbing Center, May 15 - June 30. Exhibited artists: John M. Armleder, Oliver Beer, Jérôme Bell, Daniel Firman, Stéphane Lallemand, and Kohei Sasahara. D - Cim(ais)es (trees), Bowling Alley of Douaisis, May 17 - June 23. Exhibited artists: Jean-Charles Bustamante, Dino Dinco, Anne-Marie Filaire, Charles Fréger, Geert Goiris, Zoe Leonard, Janne Lehtinen, Sophie Ristelhueber, and Gilles Saussier. E - How to Whisper to the Ocean (marine worlds), June 1 - July 31. Exhibited artists: Martine Aballéa, Michel Blazy, Jennifer Douzenel, Simon Faithfull, Nicholas Floc’h, Patrick Jolley, and Reynold Reynolds, Philippe Ramette. F - And We Pass with Him (time), June 9 - 16. Exhibited artists: Isabelle Arthuis, Marie Denis, Ruth Ewan, Ant Farm, Véronique Joumard, Claude Parent, Georgina Starr, and Fiona Tan. G - Universal Tongue. Anouk Kruithof, Palais des sports in Grenoble, June 15-29. H - "If an animal tells you it can talk, it is probably lying" (animals), Equestrian Center of Saint-Lô, July 6 - September 1. Exhibited artists: Francis Alÿs, Anne-Charlotte Finel, Christine Laquet, Basim Magdy, Paulien Oltheten, Guillaume Pinard, Georges Rey, Margaret Salmon, Carolina Saquel, Béatrice Utrilla, and Bertrand Arnaud. I - The World Belongs to Everyone (multiculturalism), House of Conversation (adidas studio), Paris, July 13 - September 9. Exhibited artists: Mohamed Bourouissa, Aurélien Froment, Katia Kameli, Zanele Muholi, Josèfa Ntjam, Buhlebezwe Siwani, and James Webb. J - Look on the Bright Side. Yuyan Wang, Senetosa Lighthouse, Sartène, July 26 - August 11. K - "And in the storm and noise, clarity reappears magnified..." (the storm), The Dock, Marseille Capital of the Sea, September 20 - 30. Exhibited artists: Julie Chaffort, Ange Leccia, Mélissa Epaminondi, Jason Hendrik Hansma, and Julius von Bismarck. L - Unidentified Breathing Object, Peristyle of the City Hall of Tours, Paris-Tours race, October 6 - 13. Exhibited artists: Edith Dekyndt, Angelika Markul, and Bruno Peinado.

23 - Love is Everything Else, Casa Conti – Ange Leccia, Oletta, June 1–July 7, 2024. Artists included Regina Demina, Liên Hoàng-Xuân, Valentin Noujaïm, Miriam Simun, Émilie Brout and Maxime Marion.

24 - Arcanes, rituels et chimères, FRAC Corsica, Corte, July 4–October 19, 2024. Artists included Mathilde Albouy, Nils Alix-Tabeling, Ruba Al-Sweel, Kevin Bray, Madison Bycroft, Leonora Carrington, Dominique Degli Esposti, Justin Fitzpatrick, Michele Gabriele, Antoine Giacomoni, Cecilia Granara, Shuo Hao, Wilma Harju, Youri Johnson, Kris Lemsalu, Isaac Lythgoe, Alexandra Metcalf, Ji-Min Park and Rojda Yavuz.

25 - Château en pleurs, an exhibition by Tohé Commaret and Sarah-Anaïs Desbenoit, Casa Conti – Ange Leccia, Oletta, July 12–August 31, 2024.

26 - La Seconde vie des images en mouvement, FRAC Corsica, Corte, November 6, 2024–April 26, 2025. Artists included Basma Al Sharif, Fayçal Baghriche, Craig Baldwin, Sammy Baloji, Vicki Bennett, Candice Breitz, Ufuoma Essi, Pierre Gaignard, Laura Gozlan, Max Grau, Rokni and Ramin Haerizadeh, Jason Hendrik Hansma, Camille Henrot, Gala Hernández López, Saodat Ismailova, Ulysses Jenkins, Anouk Kruithof, Larry Law, Ange Leccia, Lawrence Lek, Maha Maamoun, Christian Marclay, Diego Marcon, Neozoon, Agnieszka Polska, Hesam Rahmanian, Ben Rivers, Anhar Salem, Deborah Stratman, Fiona Tan, Naomi Uman, Amalia Vargas and Ming Wong.

27 - Accords et dissonances, Palais Fesch – Musée des Beaux-Arts, Ajaccio, April 4–June 2, 2025. Artists included Eleanor Antin, Pierre Ardouvin, Leonardo Boscani, Christian Buffa, Jean-Marc Bustamante, Talia Chetrit, Dominique Degli Esposti, Anne Deleporte, Raymond Depardon, Philippe Durand, Marcel Fortini, Alicia Framis, Alberto Garcia-Alix, Dan Graham, Véronique Joumard, Joachim Mogarra, Andreas Müller-Pöhle, Mame-Diarra Niang, Jack Pierson, Sara Ramo, Meredyth Sparks, Patrick Tosani and Alexandra Villani.

28 - Fin de Party, with Cyrus Goberville, FRAC Corsica, Corte, May 14–October 18, 2025. Artists included Ziad Antar, Meriem Bennani, Davide Balula, Camille Blatrix, Jeremy Deller, Charles Hascoët, Kamilya Kuspanova, Hanne Lippard, João Onofre, Charlemagne Palestine, Pipilotti Rist and Christine Sun Ki.

29 - Always the Sun, Casa Conti – Ange Leccia, Oletta, June 7–August 31, 2025. Artists included A.K. Burns, Saodat Ismailova, Ange Leccia, Agnieszka Polska and Muhannad Shono.

30 - À leur image, with Sébastien Arrighi, FRAC Corsica, Corte, November 3, 2025–April 11, 2026. Artists included Sébastien Arrighi, Doriane Bouisset, Lea Eouzan-Pieri, Zoé Ferraioli, Yoann Giovannoni, Geert Goiris, Amandine Joset-Battini, Mona Favoreu, Yan Leandri, Sabatina Leccia, Emmanuelle Lainé, Juliette Liautaud, Kateryna Lymar, Angèle Marignac-Serra, Louis Maurel, Diane Moulenc, Nicolas Quiriconi, Lola Reboud, Mattea Riu, Eric Tabuchi and Nelly Monnier, Trompez-la-mort and Kamil Zihniogliu.

31 - Atlantropa n’aura pas lieu, FRAC Corsica, Corte, April 30–October 17, 2026. Artists included Clémentine Adou, Ouassila Arras, Rossella Biscotti, Sylvie Blocher, Beatrix von Conta, Julien Creuzet, Abigail DeVille, Marlene Dumas, Forensic Architecture, Michele Gabriele, Jason Hendrik Hansma, David Horvitz, Euridice Zaituna Kala, Emma Kay, Tania Mouraud, Camille Pozzo di Borgo, Laure Prouvost, David Raffini, Shimabuku, Emilija Škarnulytė, Barthélémy Toguo, Iris Touliatou, Céline Vaché-Olivieri and Ziyu Zhou.

33 - Marfa Orange Metallic, FRAC Corsica, Corte, November 4, 2026–April 30, 2027. Artists include Pascale Amblard, Alexia Caamano, Philippe Caamano, Anne-Lise Coste, François Curlet, Sylvie Fanchon, Matthew Genitempo, Donald Judd, William Leavitt, Teresa Margolles, Charlotte Moth, Cornelia Parker, Caroline Poggi, Nicolas Quiriconi, Manuella Riestra, Sequoia Scavullo, Bryan Schutmaat, Stéphane Steiner, Thomas Teurlai and Jean-Philippe Volonter.

== Bibliography ==
- Le Cinéma de Guy Debord ou la négativité à l'oeuvre (1952-1994) (The cinema of Guy Debord or the negativity (1952-1994)), Paris, Paris expérimental, 2011 (ISBN 978-2912539427)
- With Fabrice Flahutez and Emmanuel Guy, La Fabrique du cinéma de Guy Debord, Paris, Actes Sud, 2013 (ISBN 978-2330017569)
- With Fabrice Flahutez and Emmanuel Guy, Undercover Guy Debord, Paris, Artvenir, 2012 (ISBN 978-2953940619)
- La nymphe et le phallus : sur Three Horizontals et l'angoisse suspendue (The nymph and the phallus: Three Horizontals and suspended anxiety), dans Fabien Danesi, Evelyne Grossman, Frédéric Vengeon, Louise Bourgeois "Three Horizontals, Paris, INHA/Collège International de Philosophie, éditions Ophrys, 2011 (ISBN 978-2708012905)
- Le mythe brisé de l'Internationale situationniste : l'aventure d'une avant-garde au cœur de la culture de masse (1945-2008) (Shattered the myth of the Situationist International: the adventure of an avant-garde at the heart of mass culture (1945-2008)), Les presses du réel, Dijon, 2007 (ISBN 978-2840662037)
- L'œil nomade. La photographie de voyage avec Ange Leccia (The nomad eye. Travel photography with Ange Leccia), Paris, Isthme éditions, 2005 (ISBN 2866213556)
- De la transposition. Notes sur l'écriture-cinéma de Christian Merlhiot (Transposition. Notes on writing-cinema Christian Merlhiot), Christian Merlhiot, Paris, Léo Scheer, 2003.

== Filmography ==
- Le désert n'a jamais tort, sur la route du Land art (The desert is never wrong, on the road to Land Art), with Fabrice Flahutez and Adeline Lausson, Paris, coproduction Galerie Vivo-equidem - Pavillon Neuflize OBC, laboratoire de création du palais de Tokyo (Palais de Tokyo creative laboratory), 30'33, 2011
