= Desmond Ravenstone =

American writer and activist

Desmond Ravenstone is a writer, blogger, activist and educator on sexuality issues, who has spoken on BDSM and other alternative sexual identities, and currently focuses on sex workers' rights. A former Unitarian Universalist lay leader, he has frequently addressed the intersection of sexuality and spirituality.

== Biography ==
Ravenstone first became involved in the BDSM community addressing the issue of "ravishment" or rape fantasies. He wrote a number of articles and two books. dealing with both the psychology and practical enactment of ravishment role-play, and helped to form the online Ravishment Network (RavNet) as a forum for education and advocacy.

Ravenstone has also led workshops on ravishment, erotic role-playing and other subjects to a number of BDSM groups across the country. He served as education coordinator for the New England Dungeon Society for two years, and authored an advice column for the online zine '‘The Dominant's View'’.

Ravenstone was a member of Arlington Street Church, an historic Unitarian Universalist congregation, where he served on the worship committee as well as serving as Co-Moderator, and other leadership roles; in the past, he has represented the congregation as a delegate to the Mass Bay District and the UUA General Assembly. He also wrote a blog for several years, '‘‘Ravenstone's Reflections'’’, offering his thoughts on sexuality, spirituality, politics and other related topics. This gave him a prominent place to speak on behalf of kinksters, polyamorists and other "alt-sexers" within the UU denomination. Ravenstone started the organization Leather & Grace in 2011, for UUs identified with kink and BDSM. In October 2014, he published a lengthy post on his blog, defending the view that kink should be regarded as a sexual orientation, which was also carried as a guest blog on the website of the National Coalition for Sexual Freedom.

In October 2015, Ravenstone posted on his blog that he was leaving organized Unitarian Universalism, expressing frustration at how resistant the leadership of the Unitarian Universalist Association's handled many issues, including those around sexuality. In January 2017, he officially ended Ravenstone's Reflections, and announced the start of a new blog devoted specifically to sex workers' rights, The Harlot's Bulldog. He currently administrates the website for Clients of Sex Workers Allied for Change (CoSWAC)

Ravenstone is politically unaffiliated, and describes himself as a "libertarian progressive" and "deep pragmatist". In 2008, he ran a write-in campaign for president on a sexual freedom platform; his running-mate was Theresa "Darklady" Reed, a fellow writer and sexual-freedom activist from Oregon.
