= Ariel Sands =

Pseudonymous author

Ariel Sands is the pseudonymous author of the sadomasochistic novel Never the Face. She is also said to be an internationally known writer of non-fiction under another name. Her true identity is not publicly known.

== Never the Face ==
Never the Face describes a sadomasochistic relationship between a man, David, and the book's narrator, a woman identified only as "Kitten" or "Bitch". In the novel, David trains Kitten to be the submissive partner in a sexual relationship that includes bondage, orgasm control and beating her with a variety of implements. What begins as a consensual relationship spirals into increasing physical and emotional abuse. The book contains explicit sexual imagery that has been described as "brutal". It was published in April 2011 by St Martin's Press.

== Identity ==
To date the chief clues to Sands' identity are in an interview she gave to Claire Messud for Guernica magazine. According to Messud, who met Sands in person in Berlin in May 2011, "under another name, Ariel Sands is an internationally known and highly respected writer of nonfiction." (She does not specify whether this other name is a real name or also a pseudonym.) Sands is "slight and elegant" but with "a commanding presence: in her professional capacity, she is accustomed to speaking before crowds." Both her fiction and non-fiction writing, as well as her speech, are characterized by "acerbic wit", "erudition" and "concision". Her "demeanor is formal, sometimes clipped; but she has a ready, throaty laugh". She is "feminist by her own admission" and a "female success story" despite the "obsessive submissiveness" of her novel's protagonist. She is "on the cusp of forty". The interview does not mention her nationality.

Her publisher's website describes her only as a "bestelling author".

== Reasons for pseudonymity ==
In her interview with Messud, Sands says that she chose a pseudonym to avoid "genre confusion" with her non-fiction writing, and so that the text "would be taken on its own terms", rather than influenced by what readers already knew about the author.

== Influences ==
Books that Sands mentions as influencing hers include Story of O, Venus in Furs, Moby-Dick, The Man of Feeling, and The Emigrants.
