= Hardy Haberman =

American writer

Hardy Kemp Haberman
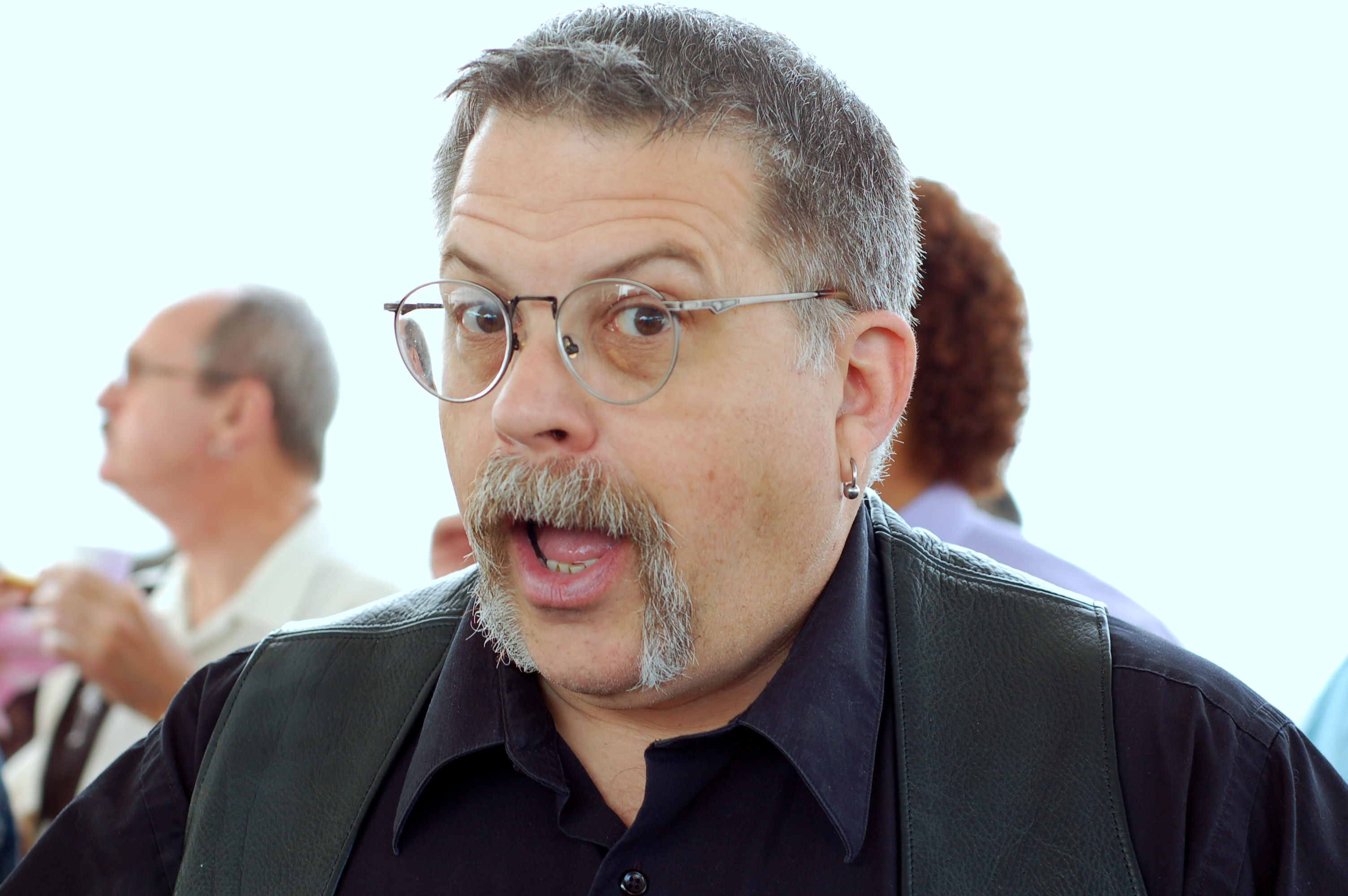
- Born: Dallas, Texas
- Education: Baylor University
- Occupations: Author, director, educator, gay rights activist
- Board member of: Woodhull Sexual Freedom Alliance
- Partner: Patrick Ryan (1995-present)
- Awards: NLAI Man of the Year Award (1999), NLAI Lifetime Achievement Award (2007), National Gay and Lesbian Task Force Leather Leadership Award (2009), Pantheon of Leather President's Award (20011)
- Website: dungeondiary.blogspot.com

Hardy Haberman is an American author, filmmaker, educator, designer living in Dallas, Texas. He is a prominent figure in the leather/fetish/BDSM community, and a frequent speaker at leather events and contests.

In the mid-1970s, Haberman become involved in LGBT activism as part of the Dallas Gay Political Caucus (later known as the Dallas Gay and Lesbian Alliance), the city's first LGBT advocacy group. In late 1976, he became interested in the leather subculture. In 1980, Haberman co-produced the first Cedar Springs Carnival, held during Gay Pride Week in Dallas. The Carnival coincided with the Dallas Gay Pride Parade, an event organized by a committee of Oak Lawn merchants and the first in Dallas since 1972. In 1984 Haberman joined the board of the Dallas chapter of the Gay & Lesbian Alliance Against Defamation (GLAAD). By the late 1990s, Haberman was a well-known educator in leather circles, teaching classes at events such as Texas Leather Pride in Austin, Spring Iniquity in Houston, Southeast Leatherfest in Atlanta, Kinky Kollege in Chicago, Leathermans Discussion Group in San Francisco, and in many other events in the United States and Canada. In 1999, Haberman and Bill Schmeling received the Steve Maidhof Award for National or International Work from the National Leather Association International. In 2007, the NLAI presented Haberman with a Lifetime Achievement Award. In 2010, he received the President's Award as part of the Pantheon of Leather Awards. In January 2014, he became a columnist for Leatherati. In addition to his regular columns he has written for many print and online publications. In 2017, Haberman received the South Central Regional Award as part of the Pantheon of Leather Awards, and joined the Jeffrey Payne 2018 Texas gubernatorial campaign as media director. In 2019, Haberman received the Mr. Marcus Hernandez Lifetime Achievement Award (Man) as part of the Pantheon of Leather Awards.

Haberman is an active member of the Cathedral of Hope Church in Dallas, TX, known for having the largest predominately gay and lesbian congregation in the world. He is formerly the chairperson on the board of directors of the Woodhull Sexual Freedom Alliance. He also writes a column called Flagging Left for Dallas Voice, a Dallas LGBT newspaper.

== Bibliography ==
=== Books ===
- The Family Jewels: A Guide to Male Genital Play and Torment, Greenery Press, 2001. HB ISBN 1890159344 (PB ISBN 1890159344)
- More Family Jewels: Further Explorations in Male Genitorture, Nazca Plains Corp, 2007. PB ISBN 1934625094
- Playing With Pain: Stories from My Life in Leather, Nazca Plains Corp, 2007. PB ISBN 1934625175
- Soul of a Second Skin: The Journey of a Gay Christian Leatherman, Nazca Plains Corp, 2007. PB ISBN 1934625388
- Shouts in the Wilderness: Daily Meditations for Leatherfolk, Adynaton Publishing, 2017, PB ISBN 0985900490

=== Films ===
- Leather (1996), director and cinematographer
- Out of the Darkness: The Reality of SM (2001), director
- The Big Fair - Inside the Great State Fair of Texas (2001), director, ISBN 978-0-8026-0946-5
