= Greenery Press =

American BDSM publishing house

- Greenery Press Logo
- Founded: 1991
- Founder: Janet Hardy
- Country of origin: United States
- Headquarters location: Emeryville, California
- Distribution: SCB Distributors (US); Turnaround Publisher Services (UK)
- Publication types: Books
- Nonfiction topics: BDSM
- Imprints: Grass Stain Press
- Official website: Currently Unavailable/Hacked

Greenery Press is an American publishing house based in Emeryville, California, specializing in books on BDSM (particularly femdom) and polyamory, with over 50 titles in print. Most titles are non-fiction, but a smaller number of fiction titles and memoirs are published under the Grass Stain Press name. Greenery's sales top 100,000 books per year.

== History ==
Greenery Press was founded in 1991 by author Janet Hardy. In 1995 it merged with Jay Wiseman Books under the Greenery name. Hardy continues to run the company, while Wiseman continues to serve on the Press's board of directors.

Greenery Press closed its new books program in 2019 upon the retirement of editorial director Janet W. Hardy and is no longer publishing new titles.

== Program ==
Greenery's list of titles include works by such notable authors such as Hardy herself, Dossie Easton, Wiseman and Midori, their most popular title is The Ethical Slut: A Guide to Infinite Sexual Possibilities, which has been translated into several languages and has sold over 50,000 copies as of 2004.

- Jay Wiseman, SM 101: A Realistic Introduction, Greenery Press, 2000. ISBN 0-9639763-8-9.
- Jay Wiseman, Jay Wiseman's Erotic Bondage Handbook, Greenery Press, 2000. ISBN 1-890159-13-1.
- Dossie Easton, Catherine A. Liszt, When Someone You Love Is Kinky, Greenery Press, 2000. ISBN 1-890159-23-9.
- Dossie Easton, Janet W. Hardy, The New Topping Book. Greenery Press, 2003. ISBN 1-890159-36-0.
- Dossie Easton, Janet W. Hardy, The New Bottoming Book. Greenery Press, 2001. ISBN 1-890159-35-2.
- Midori, The Seductive Art of Japanese Bondage, Greenery Press, 2001. ISBN 1-890159-38-7.
- Lorelei, The Mistress Manual: The Good Girl's Guide to Female Dominance, Greenery Press, 2000. ISBN 1-890159-19-0.
- John Warren, The Loving Dominant, Greenery Press, 2000. ISBN 1-890159-20-4.
- Andrew Conway, The Bullwhip Book, Greenery Press, 2000. ISBN 1-890159-18-2.
- Joseph W. Bean, Flogging, Greenery Press, 2000. ISBN 1-890159-27-1.
- M. R. Strict, Intimate Invasion: The Erotic Ins & Outs of Enema Play, Greenery Press, 2004. ISBN 1-890159-51-4.
- Lady Green, The Compleat Spanker, Greenery Press, 2000. ISBN 1-890159-00-X.
- Charles Anders, The Lazy Crossdresser, Greenery Press, 2002. ISBN 1-890159-37-9.
- Laura Antoniou, Christina Abernathy, Erotic Slavehood: A Miss Abernathy Omnibus, Greenery Press, 2007, ISBN 1-890159-71-9
- Christina Abernathy, Miss Abernathy's Concise Slave Training Manual, Greenery Press, 1998, ISBN 0-9639763-9-7
- Christina Abernathy, Training with Miss Abernathy: A Workbook for Erotic Slaves and Their Owners, Greenery Press, 1998, ISBN 1-890159-07-7

== References and further reading ==
- San Francisco Chronicle, "Greenery Press specializes in off-color topics", October 19, 2001
- Cuir Underground, Small Pervert Presses Fill the Gap, Issue 3.6, Summer 1997.

Specific
