= Mollena Williams-Haas =

American author and BDSM educator

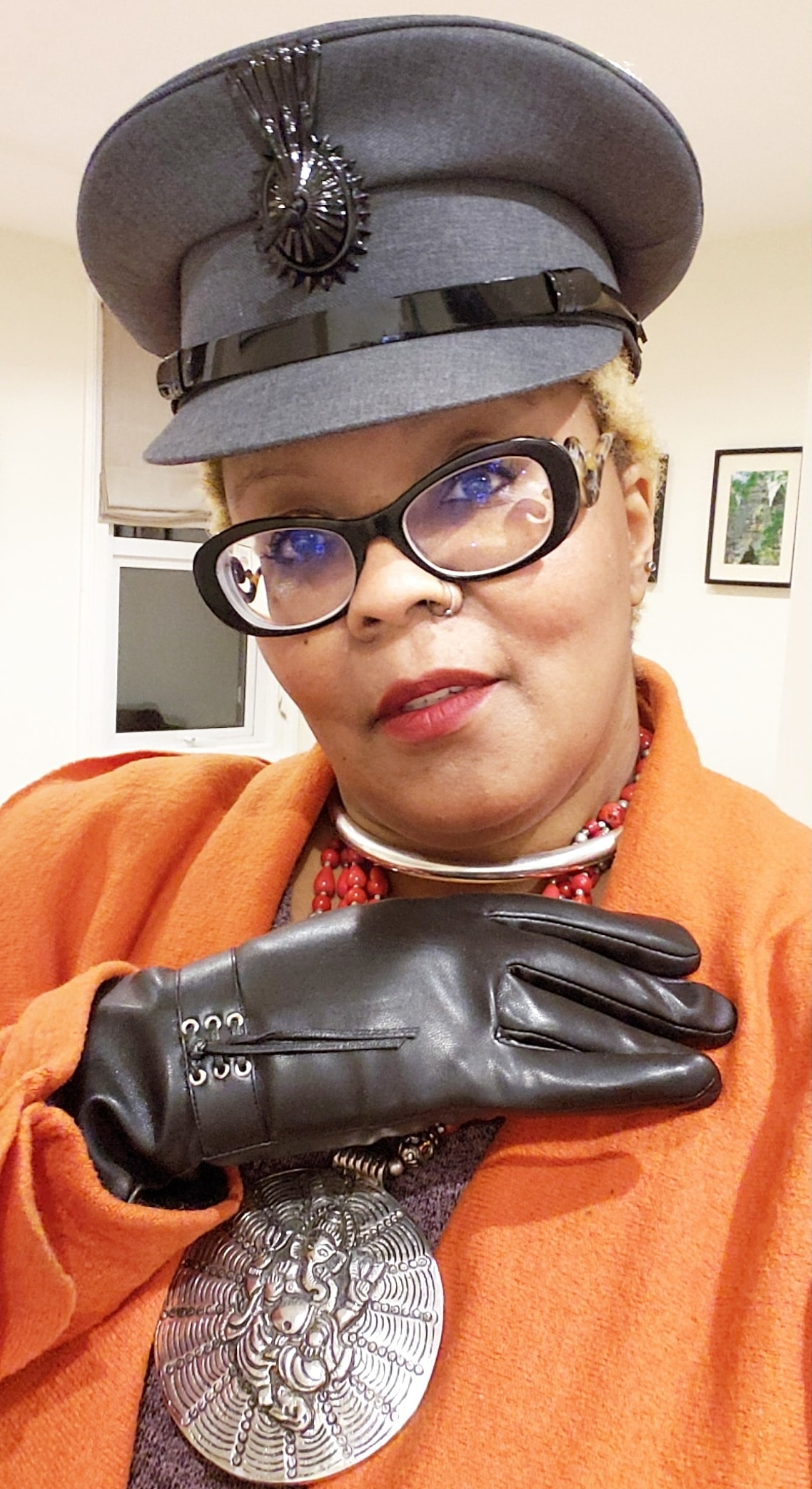
Williams-Haas in 2019

Mollena Lee Williams-Haas (formerly Williams; born 1969) is an American writer, BDSM educator, actress, and former International Ms. Leather (2010).

== Early life and education ==
She was born Mollena Lee Williams on June 20, 1969, at New York Hospital in Lenox Hill, Manhattan. Her parents, Marion and James Williams, met in 1968 while using Project TACT, one of the first dating services established in the United States.

In 1973, her father took her to see the Broadway musical Hair.

== Career ==
One of Williams-Haas' first performances was singing backup to Lena Horne on the song "Believe In Yourself (reprise)" on the soundtrack of The Wiz, a 1978 movie, in her childhood.

In 1992, she moved to Los Angeles, where she appeared in several independent films, including Skin and Bone. She co-starred in the independent cult movie America's Deadliest Home Video, developing the script in collaboration with Jack Perez. The movie is considered one of the grandfathers of "found footage" movies, predating Man Bites Dog and The Blair Witch Project. Her performance in it has been described as "brilliant."

While in Los Angeles, Williams also began exploring BDSM. She subscribed to newsletter of the Society of Janus and explored kink and fetish in what was then a newly burgeoning world of online chat forums. She has been involved with the leather subculture and BDSM since 1996.

In 2009, she was named Ms. San Francisco Leather. In 2010, she was named International Ms. Leather.

She contributed the essay "BDSM and Race Play", which was published in Rachel Kramer Bussel’s book, Best Sex Writing 2010.

In 2011, she published The Toybag Guide to Playing With Taboo.

Her short film IMPACT, which involves her participating in BDSM scenes, was released in 2012.

Also in 2012, Williams-Haas was awarded the Jack McGeorge Excellence in Education Award by Black Rose, a BDSM organization. She won the National Leather Association International’s Cynthia Slater Non-Fiction Article Award in both 2012 and 2013 for "Tables Briefly Turned" and "On Collars And Closure and Owning Myself", respectively. Also in 2013, she shared the National Leather Association International's Geoff Mains nonfiction book award with Lee Harrington for Playing Well With Others: Your Field Guide to Discovering, Exploring and Navigating the Kink, Leather and BDSM Communities, which they co-authored.

In 2014, she was a guest on Season 1, Episode 6 of the Sunny Megatron show on Showtime, speaking on and demonstrating the fetish commonly referred to as race play.

In 2016, The New York Times published an article about her BDSM relationship with her husband Georg Friedrich Haas.

== Personal life ==
Williams-Haas is married to composer Georg Friedrich Haas, who is the dominant partner in the couple's BDSM relationship. The couple maintains a residence in New York City's Harlem neighborhood.
