= Tess Danesi =

American sex educator, blogger, and writer of BDSM erotica

- Occupation: blogger
- Writing career
- Period: 21st century
- Genres: BDSM and erotica
- Subject: Sexuality
- Website: nyc-urban-gypsy.blogspot.com

Tess Danesi is an American sex educator, blogger, and writer of BDSM erotica who conducts workshops, courses, and events. She writes for the American erotica anthology market, has contributed to Time Out New York, and has been featured in Fleshbot, a sex-oriented weblog, founded by Gawker Media.

== Books ==
=== Contributor ===
- Fast Girls: Erotica for Women, Cleis Press, 2010, ISBN 978-1-57344-384-5
- Surrender: Erotic Tales of Female Pleasure and Submission, Cleis Press, 2011, ISBN 978-1-57344-652-5
- Bottoms Up: Spanking Good Stories, Cleis Press, 2011, ISBN 978-1-57344-362-3
- Do Not Disturb: Hotel Sex Stories, Cleis Press, 2009, ISBN 978-1-57344-344-9
- Please, Sir: Erotic Stories of Female Submission, Cleis Press, 2010, ISBN 978-1-57344-389-0
- Pleasure Bound: True Bondage Stories, Cleis Press, 2009, ISBN 978-1-57344-354-8

=== Digital releases ===
- Momentum: Making Waves in Sexuality Feminism and Relationships
