= Jay Wiseman =

American BDSM author, educator, and expert witness

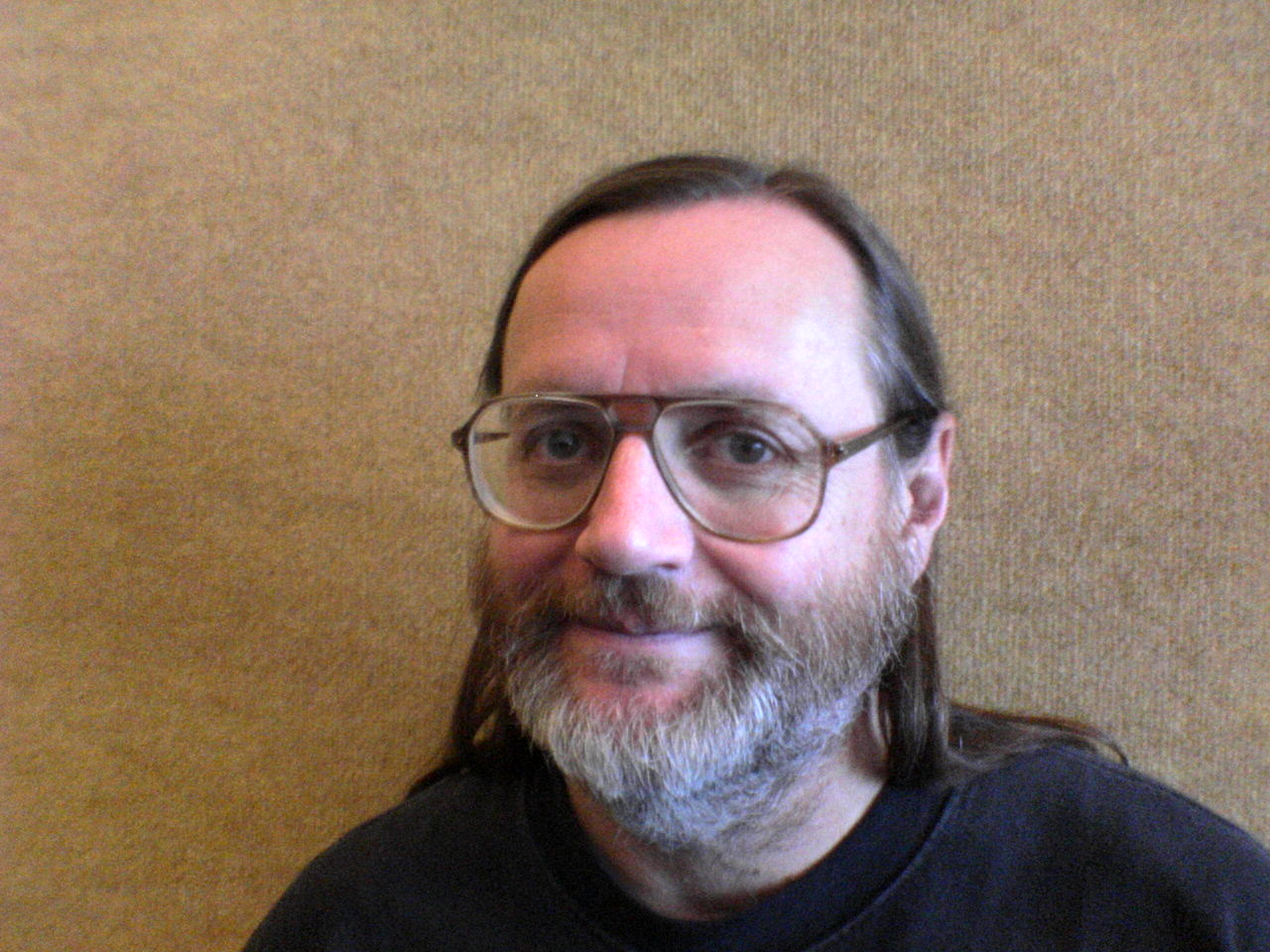
- Jay Wiseman, 2007
- Born: June 16, 1949 (age 77); New Albany, Indiana
- Occupations: Author, Expert Witness
- Writing career
- Subjects: BDSM and related safety issues
- Notable awards: Society of Janus' Hall of Fame Inductee
- Website: jaywiseman.com

Jay Joseph Wiseman (1949–2026) was an American BDSM author, educator, and expert legal witness. His book SM 101: A Realistic Introduction has somewhere in the area of 100,000 copies in print. It is also one of the Society of Janus' "Suggested Readings" regarding BDSM.

Greenery Press was founded in 1991 by author Janet Hardy, and in 1995 it merged with Jay Wiseman Books under the Greenery name. Hardy continues to run the company, while Wiseman served on the Press's board of directors.

After receiving royalties from the distribution of SM 101: A Realistic Introduction, he took the resultant funds and put himself through the New College of California School of Law. Later on, he became an adjunct professor at the same college. Although the college is now defunct, he is still listed through documentation as having taught "Advanced Legal Concepts" and "Legal Analysis".

== Awards ==
Jay Wiseman is an inductee of the Society of Janus Hall of Fame.

== Works ==
As of 2018, Wiseman has written 12 books and dozens of articles in magazines from Playboy to Redbook. A selected list includes:

- "An Essay about 'The Old Days'"
- "Emergency Training For SM Practitioners"
- Personal AD-ventures: How to Meet People Through Personal Ads
- Bay Area Sexuality Resources Guidebook
- SM 101: A Realistic Introduction, (1st ed, 1992), 2nd ed—Greenery Press, 2000. ISBN 0-9639763-8-9
- Tricks—More than 125 Ways to Make Good Sex Better, 1992
- Tricks 2—Another 125 Ways to Make Good Sex Better, 1993
- Sex Toy Tricks: 125 Ways to Accessorize, 1995
- Supermarket Tricks—More than 125 Ways to Improvise Good Sex, 1996
- Jay Wiseman's Erotic Bondage Handbook, Greenery Press, 2000. ISBN 1-890159-13-1.
- Dungeon Emergencies and Supplies
- Tricks to Please a Man
