= Lord Morpheous =

Canadian sex educator, author and photographer

Lord Morpheous is a Canadian sex educator, author and photographer based in New York. He is the author of How to Be Kinky: A Beginner’s Guide to BDSM, How to Be Kinkier: More Adventures in Adult Playtime and Bondage Basics: Naughty Knots and Risque Restraints You Need to Know. Morpheous' work is archived in the Sexual Representation Collection of the University of Toronto's Mark S. Bonham Centre for Sexual Diversity Studies, at the Leather Archives and Museum in Chicago, and at the National Archives of Canada. Morpheous has taught a variety of workshops on rope bondage, the aesthetics of bondage, fetish photography, advanced and beginner BDSM, and workshops catered to professional dominants and submissives. He is also the founder of Morpheous’ Bondage Extravaganza, an annual rope bondage themed art installation.

== Education ==
Morpheous gained a B.Ed and an Honours BA in Visual Art with a Minor in English. He also has a Degree in Broadcasting.

== Morpheous' Bondage Extravaganza ==
Lord Morpheous hosted an annual event called Morpheous' Bondage Extravaganza (also known as MBE), an annual public display of rope bondage during the Nuit Blanche festival in Toronto. The event featured 12 hours of rope bondage art ranging from simple bondage performed on the floor to aerial suspension. This installation was not an official part of Nuit Blanche. According to the event website, the first Morpheous’ Bondage Extravaganza took place in a storefront window on Toronto's Queen Street West in 2007, and grew to a 4,000 square foot venue in Toronto. The event was also live-streamed over the internet and expanded to include an MBE in Orlando, Florida and San Francisco, California. The event grew over the years, and attracted 6000 attendees across the three cities with another 75,000 watching online.

== KinkMe App ==
Morpheous is the creator of the KinkMe app. This app is designed to help the user determine their "kink compatibility" with other KinkMe app users. It instructs the user to fill out a checklist of kinky activities and then bump phones with another user to compare their kink interests and gauge their compatibility.

== Altsexed ==
Altsexed is a website dedicated to lectures and classes by Morpheous. According to the website altsexed.com, lectures and classes by Morpheous are suitable for:

- human sexuality courses and psychology & social studies
- safer sex presentations, LGBT organizations
- sexual diversity studies programs
- Undergraduate orientation week

== Journalism ==
Morpheous currently writes a BDSM and rope bondage column aimed at kink beginners for Hustler Hollywood, in which he discusses such topics as consent and communication, safety in kinky sex, and how to bring up BDSM with your partner.

== Bibliography ==
- How to be Kinky: A Beginner's Guide to BDSM; 2008, Green Candy Press, ISBN 1931160996
- How To Be Kinkier: More Adventures in Adult Playtime; 2012, Green Candy Press, ISBN 1931160945
- Bondage Basics: Naughty Knots and Risque Restraints You Need to Know; 2015, Quiver Books, ISBN 1592336450
