= Lee Harrington =

American sexuality and spirituality educator, author, and artist

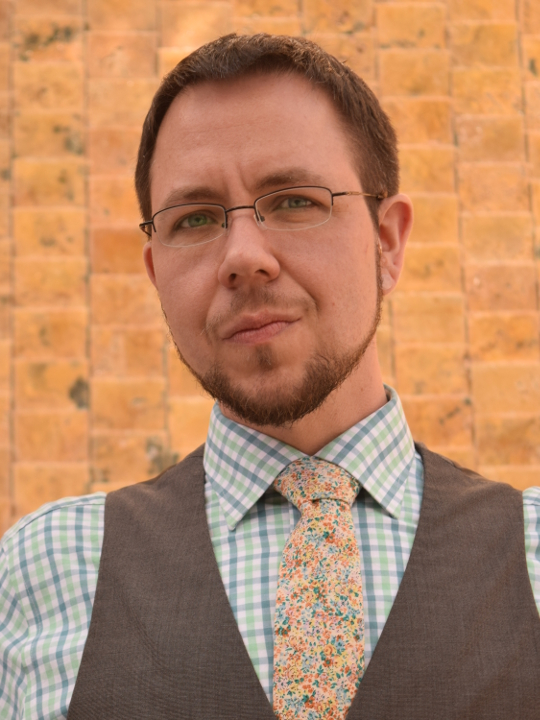
- Born: B. Harrington; 28 November 1979 (age 45); Lowell, Massachusetts, US
- Occupation: Sexuality educator, spirituality educator, author, artist

Website
- passionandsoul.com

Lee Harrington (born 28 November 1979) is a sexuality and spirituality educator, author, and artist, currently based in Denver, Colorado. He was born in Lowell, Massachusetts.

== Author and educator ==
Lee Harrington has had his writing and poetry appear in numerous magazines, anthologies, and books on the subjects of rope bondage, ageplay, spirituality, transgender rights, paganism and erotica. His book Shibari You Can Use: Japanese Rope Bondage and Erotic Macrame received the National Leather Association International’s Geoff Mains Book Award for 2008, and his books Playing Well With Others: Your Field Guide to Discovering, Exploring and Navigating the Kink, Leather and BDSM Communities (written with Mollena Williams) and More Shibari You Can Use: Passionate Rope Bondage & Intimate Connection received the National Leather Association International’s Geoff Mains Non-fiction book award for 2013 and 2016 respectively.

== Model and photographer ==
From 1999 to 2006, Harrington was an adult film actor, pornographer, and sex blogger. He placed in the 2005 SIGNY Award for Best Bondage Model, and appeared on more than 70 adult websites (including Kink.com), various television appearances (such as Playboy's Sexcetera), and in a variety feature-length adult films.

== Personal life ==
Harrington is a trans man and uses he/they pronouns.

== Bibliography ==
=== Books authored ===
List of books authored by Harrington:

- Become Your Own Beloved: A Guide to Delighting in Self-Connection (2023) ISBN 978-1637589038
- Traversing Gender: Understanding Transgender Realities (2016) ISBN 978-1-942733-81-2
- On Starry Thighs: Sacred and Sensual Poetry (2015) ISBN 978-0-9778727-6-3
- More Shibari You Can Use: Passionate Rope Bondage & Intimate Connection (2015) ISBN 978-0-9778-7275-6
- Playing Well With Others: Your Field Guide to Discovering, Exploring and Navigating the Kink, Leather and BDSM Communities (2012) ISBN 9780937609583 (written with Mollena Williams)
- Sacred Kink: The Eightfold Path of BDSM and Beyond (2010) ISBN 978-0-557-21176-0
- Shed Skins: Journeying in Self-Portraits (2010)
- The Toybag Guide to Age Play (2007) ISBN 1-890159-73-5
- Shibari You Can Use: Japanese Rope Bondage and Erotic Macramé (2006) ISBN 978-0-6151-4490-0

=== Books edited ===
List of books edited by Harrington:

- Queer Magic: Power Beyond Boundaries (2018) ISBN 978-1942733799
- Spirit of Desire: Personal Explorations of Sacred Kink (2011) ISBN 978-0-557-99241-6
- Rope, Bondage, and Power (2009) ISBN 9781935509028
