= Midori (author) =

Japanese-American artist, writer and sex educator

- 美登里
- Born: Kyoto, Japan
- Education: University of California, Berkeley
- Occupations: Author, Educator, Artist, Speaker, and Coach
- Writing career
- Subjects: Psychology of Sexuality, Japanese rope bondage, BDSM, Relationships
- Website: planetmidori.com

Midori (美登里) is a sexologist, educator, author, artist, speaker, and coach. Midori wrote the first English language book with instruction on Japanese rope bondage and continues to write on alternative sexual practices, including BDSM and sexual fetishism, bondage, erotic fiction, and more. She teaches classes, presents at conferences, coaches individuals and professionals, and facilitates in-depth weekend intensives. She is based in San Francisco, California.

== Biography ==
Midori was born in Kyoto, Japan, of Japanese and German parents. She grew up in Tokyo and moved to the United States at age 14. Midori studied psychology at University of California, Berkeley. She served as a United States Army Reserve Intelligence officer while earning a degree.

== Career ==
Early in her career she also worked as a condom manufacturer's sales representative. She spent a few years as a sex educator with San Francisco Sex Information. After serving in the military, she began her art career performing in queer nightclubs, collaborating with other "weirdo" transgressive and experimental artists.

Midori teaches internationally on BDSM, alternative sexuality, feminine dominance, Shibari / Japanese bondage, and kink. She has spoken at conferences, universities, and organizations promoting sexual health, wellness, and education.

In 2021, she worked with the Sexual Health Alliance to create the year-long Kink Informed Certification (KIC) Program which offers training to therapists, educators, coaches, or consultants who works with individuals engaging in kink, BDSM, and alternative sexuality.

She is known for her in-depth weekend intensives, ForteFemme: Women's Dominance Intensive and Rope Dojo: Rope Bondage Weekend Intensive where she uses her "head-heart-hands" method to create a space where people are allowed individual self-exploration. Her work focuses on helping people to create authentic and intimate relationships while emphasizing self-actualization, shame reduction, acceptance, and justice.

== Art ==
Midori is a multidisciplinary, social practice artist. She creates installations, performances, group exhibitions & social practice projects that examine human narratives, cultural experiences of queerness and Asian American Pacific Islander (AAPI) heritage, and ephemeral nature of memory and place. She has presented lectures at several universities and is a resident artist at the San Francisco Battery.

Midori's work has been shown at San Francisco Asian Art Museum, Yerba Buena Center for the Arts, Leslie Lohman Museum, SOMArts, Ithaca College, Das Arts Amsterdam, Gorilla Gallery Oaxaca, Root Division, among others.

She offers creative coaching and consulting through the Intersection for the Arts, a Bay Area arts nonprofit that's dedicated to helping artists grow.

== Awards ==
- Pantheon of Leather Awards Woman of the Year, 2003
- Sainted by the Sisters of Perpetual Indulgence, 2007
- Best Sex Educator by SF Weekly Magazine, 2013
- Society of Janus Hall of Fame, 2019
- AASECT Humanitarian Award, 2022

== Bibliography ==
- The Seductive Art of Japanese Rope Bondage, Greenery Press, 2002
- Wild Side Sex: The Book of Kink: Educational, Sensual, And Entertaining Essays, Daedalus Publishing, 2005
- The Toybag Guide to Foot and Shoe Worship, Greenery Press, 2005
- Master Han's Daughter: Tales from Depraved NeoTokyo Circlet Press, 2006
- Silk Threads (co-author), Riverdale Avenue Books LLC, 2019
- An Intersectional Approach to Sex Therapy: Centering the Lives of Indigenous, Racialized, and People of Color (contributing author), Routledge Press, 2022
- Fundamental Concepts and Critical Developments in Sex Education: Intersectional and Trauma-Informed Approaches, (contributing author), Routledge Press, 2025
