= The Ethical Slut =

1997 book by Dossie Easton and Janet Hardy

- Cover of the first edition
- Author: Dossie Easton; Janet Hardy
- Genre: Nonfiction; Self-help
- Published: 1997 (Greenery Press); 2nd ed. 2009; 3rd ed. 2017 (Ten Speed Press)

The Ethical Slut is a self-help book about non-monogamy written by Dossie Easton and Janet Hardy. In the book, Easton and Hardy discuss non-monogamy as a concept and a practice, and explore sexual practices and common challenges in non-monogamous relationships.

The book was first published in 1997 by Greenery Press, which Hardy founded, under the title The Ethical Slut: A Guide to Infinite Sexual Possibilities. Hardy used the pseudonym "Catherine A. Liszt" for the first edition. Revised and updated editions were published in 2009 and 2017, with updated subtitles.

The Ethical Slut is widely read by non-monogamous and polyamorous people. More than 200,000 copies have been sold, and the book has been analyzed and reviewed in an academic context.

== Background ==
In 1969, Dossie Easton left a traumatic relationship and gave birth to a daughter. Easton joined a queer community in San Francisco, where she taught sex education classes and workshops for the San Francisco Sex Organization beginning with a class on "unlearning jealousy" in 1973. She was a founding member of the Society of Janus, a BDSM group in San Francisco, and is also a psychotherapist. In 1988, Janet Hardy left a 13-year marriage, having decided she wanted to be non-monogamous. In 1991, she founded Greenery Press, a publisher focused on "adult sexuality". Easton and Hardy met in 1992 through the Society of Janus, where Easton was teaching a class on "Pain Play with Canes" and Hardy volunteered to help with a demonstration; the two began a relationship as co-authors as well as friends and lovers. Both women identify as queer and polyamorous.

In 1994, Hardy had influenza leading to bronchitis, and watched Indecent Proposal while she was bedridden. At one point in the movie, an attractive billionaire offers a married couple one million dollars in exchange for one night with the woman in the relationship. Hardy was shocked by the couple's hesitation. The experience led her to realize her alienation from "mainstream sexual ethics", and she contacted Hardy; the two began working on a book about non-monogamy. The authors drew on their own experiences while writing the book. Easton wanted to reappropriate the word slut.

The Ethical Slut was the third book Easton and Hardy wrote together; their first two, The Topping Book and The Bottoming Book, focused on kink and reached a relatively small readership. Their other works include When Someone You Love is Kinky, The New Bottoming Book, The New Topping Book, and Radical Ecstasy.

== Publication ==
The Ethical Slut: A Guide to Infinite Sexual Possibilities was written by Dossie Easton and Janet Hardy, the latter using the pseudonym "Catherine A. Liszt" for the first edition. It was published in 1997 by Greenery Press.

A second edition, titled The Ethical Slut. A Practical Guide to Polyamory, Open Relationships and Other Adventures, was published in 2009. Promotional blurbs were provided by Deborah Anapol, Betty Dodson, Stan Dale, and Ryam Nearing.

A third edition was published on August 15, 2017 by Ten Speed Press. The third edition used the title The Ethical Slut, Third Edition: A Practical Guide to Polyamory, Open Relationships, and Other Freedoms in Sex and Love. The republication marked the 20th anniversary of the book. It was updated to address cultural and technological developments including gender variance and dating apps, as well as biographical information about early polyamorous people and Black polyamorous activism.

The Ethical Slut was translated into Spanish by Miguel Vagalume, a member of Golfxs con Principios, a Spanish group named after the book and focused on "non-conventional sex".

== Synopsis ==
The Ethical Slut is a self-help book intended as a guide to non-monogamy. It is divided into four sections. Each section includes exercises to help the reader explore relevant concepts. The book is written in casual language, intended to make it accessible and to avoid medicalizing or othering.

=== "Welcome" ===
The first section of the book, titled "Welcome", is an overview of non-monogamy as a concept. In this section, Easton and Hardy define a slut as "a person of any gender who has the courage to lead life according to the radical proposition that sex is nice and pleasure is good for you", and encourage the reader to embrace and explore their desires. They state that an "ethical slut" must care for and communicate with their partner or partners, regardless of the degree of commitment in any given relationship, and discuss other relevant values and ethics. They also note that non-monogamy is not a new phenomenon.

=== "The Practice of Sluthood" ===
The second section, titled "The Practice of Sluthood", argues against thinking of intimacy and love as scarce resources in a "starvation economy". The authors suggest that this mindset is the cause of fear and possessiveness in relationships. They also discuss boundaries and jealousy.

=== "Navigating Challenges" ===
The third section is titled "Navigating Challenges". In this section, Easton and Hardy discuss strategies for dealing with jealousy and insecurity as well as conflict resolution. They additionally describe difficulties non-monogamous people may have with the government, including legal and health issues as well as parenting.

=== "Sluts in Love" ===
The fourth and final section, "Sluts in Love", focuses on sexual practices in non-monogamy. Topics include swinging and open relationships, the status of single people in non-monogamy, and group sex. The authors also advocate that people should be clear about their desires during sex and discuss methods of finding sexual and relationship partners.

== Reception ==
The Ethical Slut has become a widely used resource for non-monogamous and polyamorous people, sometimes referred to as "the poly bible". As of 2023, more than 200,000 copies had been sold since the book was first published in 1997. In 2018, Hardy told The Guardian that non-monogamy was rapidly becoming more accepted among young people.

=== In academia ===
A 2001 analysis of sexual politics in Continuum described The Ethical Slut as operating "within an entirely different paradigm" compared to common sexual liberation efforts of the 1980s, which had focused on the pursuit of "scientific knowledge" to support their arguments. Instead, the author argued that Easton and Hardy incorporated "a major shift or relocation of subjective sexual ‘truth’ from fixed sexual identities to fluid, changeable sexual practices". He suggested that this view aligned The Ethical Slut with Michel Foucault's assertion that the goal of sexual liberation should be to "use one’s sexuality henceforth to arrive at a multiplicity of relationships" rather than "discover in oneself the truth of one’s sex".

In the Electronic Journal of Human Sexuality, a reviewer found The Ethical Slut "the best book on relationships that I have ever read".

Various reviews and discussions have compared The Ethical Slut to books by Deborah Anapol, including Love Without Limits and Polyamory in the 21st Century. A book review in the Journal of Sex & Marital Therapy described The Ethical Slut and Love Without Limits as "twin cornerstones of modern consensual nonmonogamy" and characterized them as opposite ends of a spectrum of non-monogamy. According to the review, Anapol generally focused on "intimate, long-term relationships" within polyamory in contrast with The Ethical Slut's focus on "more open relational style and free sexuality". Easton has described Love Without Limits as "a perfectly good book - if a bit more conservative than ours".

A review in the Journal of Bisexuality analyzed Love Without Limits and The Ethical Slut alongside Loving More by Ryam Nearing. The author praised all three books' balanced discussion of "Paradigms, Principles and Practicalities", and stated that the authors of all three were "aware that their experiences are not universal".

In 2023, Andrea Waling wrote about The Ethical Slut in The Conversation. Waling praised the book's advocacy of "developing genuine, consensual connections through communication and honesty". She criticized the description of the "starvation economy" as merely conceptual, noting that people can and do withhold affection in their relationships. She argued that Easton and Hardy present monogamy in an unduly negative way, and also critiqued "universal assumptions about people’s experiences" including the authors' approach to dealing with emotions and their characterization of compersion.
