= Dossie Easton =

American author and family therapist (born 1944)

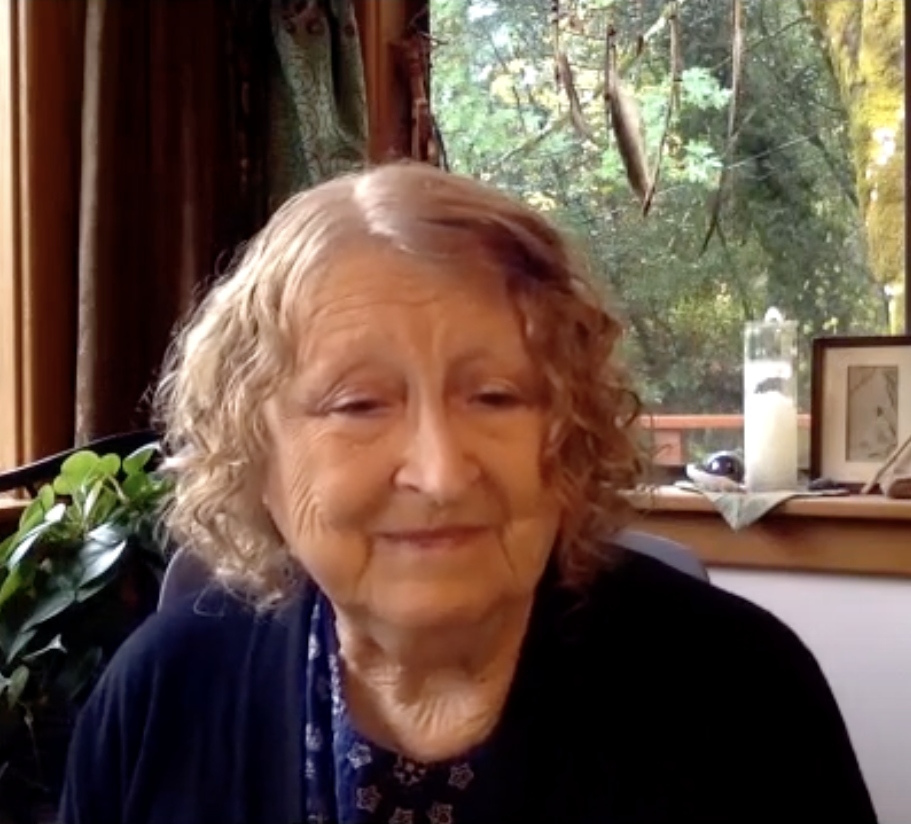
- Dossie Easton in 2022
- Born: Dorothy Marguerite Easton; February 26, 1944 (age 82); Andover, Massachusetts
- Occupations: Writer and family therapist
- Writing career
- Subjects: BDSM and sex education
- Website: www.dossieeaston.com

Dorothy "Dossie" Easton (born February 26, 1944), who has also written under the name Scarlet Woman, is an American author and family therapist based in San Francisco, California.

== Education and career ==
Easton is a non-fiction author and poet. She has been a plenary or keynote speaker at many conferences, including conferences of the American Association of Sex Educators, Counselors and Therapists (AASECT), the Society for the Scientific Study of Sex, and the University of Hamburg.

Easton has given presentations at many colleges and universities, including University of California, Santa Cruz; Bryn Mawr College; University of California, Berkeley; Mills College; Pomona College; and San Francisco State University.

Her B.A. is from New College of California, 1975; MA in Education and Counseling from University of San Francisco, 1989; Licensed Marriage and Family Therapist, 1991, USF. Her bachelor's thesis was titled Sex is Nice and Pleasure is Good for You. She worked at the Haight Ashbury Free Clinic Psych Annex in 1968 as a psychedelic crisis guide, and she worked with San Francisco Sex Information for several years, beginning in 1972. She had a radio show on sexuality on KPOO San Francisco from 1973 to 1975 called "Get in Touch", as Mandy Jenkins. She has worked in battered women's centers and mental health clinics in Santa Cruz, Sunnyvale, and San Francisco.

She was a member of the first board of directors of the Society of Janus in 1974, and is a life member. She is an inductee of the Society of Janus Hall of Fame. She also is or has been a member of other well-known BDSM organizations such as The Outcasts, Exiles, and Black Leather Wings, a radical faerie group.

In 1969, Easton made the decision never to enter into a monogamous relationship again. Her books have been cited as fundamental to the polyamory movement.

Dossie Easton has been a dedicated provider of authentic, compassionate, and respectful psychotherapy and relationship counseling for individuals exploring non-traditional lifestyles since 1962. In a 2023 talk on love, sex, polyamory, and kink, Easton said that ‘those people who live in a world of limitations and fears are missing out on so much that is possible’. The statement emphasizes the idea that there is so much more to life than what can be perceived within the confines of fear and self-imposed limitations. It encourages individuals to challenge their fears and embrace a mindset that embraces possibilities and personal expansion.

== Personal life ==
Easton is polyamorous and lives in West Marin, California.

== Works ==
=== Nonfiction books ===
- Easton, Dossie and Janet W. Hardy, Radical Ecstasy: S/M Journeys to Transcendence. San Francisco: Greenery Press, 2004.
- Easton, Dossie and Janet W. Hardy, The New Topping Book. San Francisco: Greenery Press, 2003. ISBN 1-890159-36-0.
- Easton, Dossie and Janet W. Hardy, The New Bottoming Book. San Francisco: Greenery Press, 2001. ISBN 1-890159-35-2.
- Easton, Dossie and Catherine A. Liszt. When Someone You Love Is Kinky. San Francisco: Greenery Press, 2000. ISBN 1-890159-23-9.
- Easton, Dossie and Catherine A. Liszt. The Ethical Slut. A Guide to Infinite Sexual Possibilities. San Francisco: Greenery Press, 1997. ISBN 1-890159-01-8. ISBN 978-1-890159-01-6. OCLC 37969365.

- Dossie Easton and Janet W. Hardy. The Ethical Slut: A Practical Guide to Polyamory, Open Relationships & Other Adventures. Second edition. Celestial Arts, 2009. ISBN 1-587613-37-9. ISBN 978-1-587613-37-1
- Janet W. Hardy and Dossie Easton. The Ethical Slut: A Practical Guide to Polyamory, Open Relationships & Other Freedoms in Sex and Love. Third Edition. Ten Speed Press, 2017. ISBN 978-0-399-57966-0.

=== Poetry ===
- Poems under the name Scarlet Woman and Dossie Easton in works edited by Patrick Califia, Joan Nestle (The Persistent Desire), Leslea Newman (The Femme Mystique)
- Scarlet Woman. "Roll Me Over and Make Me a Rose" and "Dress Shirt". The Persistent Desire: A Femme-Butch Reader. Ed. Joan Nestle. Boston: Alyson Publications, 1992. pp 351–352
- Scarlet Woman. "Hold Me Down So I Can Fly." The Second Coming: A Leatherdyke Reader. Ed. Pat Califia and Robin Sweeney. Boston: Alyson Publications, 1996. pp 101–103
- Scarlet Woman. "For DAVID & JERRY & CYNTHIA & MARK & now CHRISTOPHER too..." Coming to Power. Ed. by members of Samois, a lesbian/feminist BDSM organization. Boston: Alyson Publications, 1981
- Scarlet Woman: poems. Chapbook. 20pp. 1995

=== Articles ===
- "Shadowplay:SM Journeys to Our Selves" in Safe, Sane and Consensual, eds. Meg Barker and Darren Langdridge, UK 2007.
- "Making Friends with Jealousy" in Understanding Non-Monogamies, eds. Meg Barker and Darren Langdridge, Routledge, 2010.
- "Cultural Competence with BDSM Clients" in Counseling Ideologies, Queer Challenges to Heteronormativity, ed. Lyndsey Moon, Ashgate Publishing, United Kingdom, 2010.
- "Sex and Relationships: Reflections on Living Outside the Box" in Families - Beyond the Nuclear Ideal, eds. Daniela Cutas and Sarah Chan, Bloomsbury Publishing, London, 2012.

== Sources ==
- Klesse, Christian. Sexualities Vol. 9 No. 5. Special issue on Polyamory. Contains interview with Dossie Easton, "The Trials and Tribulations of being a 'Slut' – Ethical, Psychological, and Political. Thoughts on Polyamory." December 2006. pp 643–650.
- Love, Barbara, ed. Feminists who Changed America, 1963-1975, University of Illinois Press, 2006.
