= Janet Hardy =

American writer and sex educator

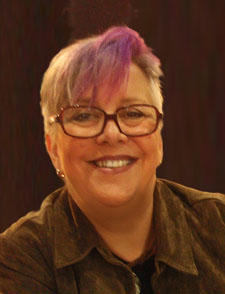
- Janet Hardy, November 10, 2009
- Born: Janet W. Hardy; United States
- Education: American
- Occupation: Writer
- Writing career
- Pen name: Catherine A. Liszt, Lady Green, Verdant, Verdie
- Language: English
- Genres: Human sexuality, sex education, BDSM
- Website: slutandsons.com

Janet W. Hardy is an American author, sex educator, and founder of Greenery Press. She has also been published as Catherine A. Liszt and Lady Green. She is the author or co-author of eleven books, and frequently collaborates with Dossie Easton.

== Personal life ==
She is genderqueer (and uses she/her pronouns), bisexual, and polyamorous. She has written that she came out as a BDSM participant a few years before she turned forty.

== Books authored or co-authored by Janet Hardy ==
- Dossie Easton, Janet W. Hardy, The New Topping Book. Greenery Press, 2003. ISBN 1-890159-36-0.
- Dossie Easton, Janet W. Hardy, The New Bottoming Book. Greenery Press, 2001. ISBN 1-890159-35-2.
- Dossie Easton, Catherine A. Liszt, When Someone You Love Is Kinky. Greenery Press, 2000. ISBN 1-890159-23-9.
- Easton, Dossie and Catherine A. Liszt. The Ethical Slut. A Guide to Infinite Sexual Possibilities. San Francisco: Greenery Press, 1997. ISBN 1-890159-01-8. ISBN 978-1-890159-01-6. OCLC 37969365.

- Dossie Easton and Janet W. Hardy. The Ethical Slut: A Practical Guide to Polyamory, Open Relationships & Other Adventures. Second edition. Celestial Arts, 2009. ISBN 1-587613-37-9. ISBN 978-1-587613-37-1
- Janet W. Hardy and Dossie Easton. The Ethical Slut: A Practical Guide to Polyamory, Open Relationships & Other Freedoms in Sex and Love. Third Edition. Ten Speed Press, 2017. ISBN 978-0-399-57966-0.

- Lady Green, The Sexually Dominant Woman: a Workbook for Nervous Beginners, Greenery Press, 1998. ISBN 978-1-890159-11-5
- Lady Green, The Compleat Spanker, Greenery Press, 2000. ISBN 1-890159-00-X.
- Lady Green (edit.), Jaymes Easton (edit.), Kinky Crafts: 101 Do-It-Yourself S/M Toys, Greenery Press, 1998, ISBN 0-9639763-7-0
- Charles Moser, Janet Hardy, Sex Disasters... and How to Survive Them, Greenery Press, 2002. ISBN 1-890159-44-1.
- Janet Hardy, The Toybag Guide to Canes and Caning, Greenery Press, 2004. ISBN 1-890159-56-5.
- Dossie Easton, Janet W. Hardy, Radical Ecstasy, Greenery Press, 2004. ISBN 1-890159-62-X.
- Janet Hardy, 21st Century Kinkycrafts, Greenery Press, 2005. ISBN 1-890159-58-1
- Janet W. Hardy, Girlfag: A Life Told in Sex and Musicals, Beyond Binary Books, 2012. ISBN 1-93812-300-X.
- Janet W. Hardy, Impervious: Confessions of a Semi-Retired Deviant. Sincyr Publishing, 2019. ISBN 978-1948780094.
- Janet W. Hardy, Notes of an Aging Pervert. Unbound Edition, 2023. ISBN 9798987019962.

== Film and TV ==
- BDSM: It's Not What You Think (2008)
- Vice & Consent (2005)
- "Sex TV" — Girl Show/The Ethical Slut/Sex and the Beard? (2002)
- Beyond Vanilla (2001)
- The Dr. Susan Block Show (1996)

== Awards ==
She received the Geoff Mains Nonfiction Book Award from the National Leather Association in 2019 for The Sexually Dominant Woman: An Illustrated Guide for Nervous Beginners, and in 2020 for Impervious: Confessions of a Semi-Retired Deviant.

She is an inductee of the Society of Janus Hall of Fame.
