= Terminology of non-monogamy =

Terminology of non-monogamy looks at the evolution and meaning of the word "polyamory" itself, as well as alternative definitions and concepts which closely relate to it.

== Overview ==
Polyamory is a hybrid word: poly is Greek for "many" and amor is Latin for "love". The article titled "A Bouquet of Lovers" written by Morning Glory Zell-Ravenheart and first published in Green Egg Magazine (Spring 1990), is widely cited as the original source of the word. The article did not use the word "polyamory" but it introduced "poly-amorous". Jennifer L. Wesp created the Usenet newsgroup alt.polyamory in May 1992, and the Oxford English Dictionary cites the proposal to create that group as the first verified appearance of the word. The term polyfidelity, now considered a subset of polyamory, was coined in the 1970s by members of the Kerista commune. Naturally, such relationships existed long before the words for them came into use. Some have even stated that polyamory owes its roots to the Oneida Community in New York State, which was founded in 1848 by John Humphrey Noyes and those following him.

The word polyamory has been applied to the practice or lifestyle of maximally inclusive romantic intimate relationships, with full knowledge and consent by all partners involved. The term is sometimes socially abbreviated to poly or polyam, especially as a form of self-description, and has often included ethical non-monogamy (ENM).

== Polyamory ==
=== History of the term ===
The word polyamory does not actually appear in "A Bouquet of Lovers", referenced above. The article does use the hyphenated "poly-amorous". The article consistently uses "polygamy" as the counterpart to "monogamy".

There are no verifiable sources showing the word polyamory in common use until after alt.polyamory was created. alt.polyamory participants collaborated on a FAQ (frequently asked questions) post that was updated periodically, and included the group's definition of "polyamory". The latest version of the FAQ on polyamory.org, dated 1997, has this definition:

Polyamory means "loving more than one". This love may be sexual, emotional, spiritual, or any combination thereof, according to the desires and agreements of the individuals involved, but you needn't wear yourself out trying to figure out ways to fit fondness for apple pie, or filial piety, or a passion for the Saint Paul Saints baseball club into it. "Polyamorous" is also used as a descriptive term by people who are open to more than one relationship, even if they are not currently involved in more than one. Some people think the definition is a bit loose, but it's got to be fairly roomy to fit the wide range of poly arrangements out there.

In 1999, Morning Glory Zell-Ravenheart was asked by the editor of the Oxford English Dictionary to define the term (which the dictionary had not previously recognised). Her definition was:

The practice, state or ability of having more than one sexual loving relationship at the same time, with the full knowledge and consent of all partners involved. This term was meant to be inclusive, and in that context, we have never intended to particularly exclude "Swinging" per se, if practitioners thereof wished to adopt the term and include themselves... The two essential ingredients of the concept of polyamory are more than one; and loving. That is, it is expected that the people in such relationships have a loving emotional bond, are involved in each other's lives multi-dimensionally, and care for each other. This term is not intended to apply to merely casual recreational sex, anonymous orgies, one-night stands, pick-ups, prostitution, "cheating," serial monogamy, or the popular definition of swinging as "mate-swapping" parties.

— Ravenhearts FAQ on Polyamory

Webster's New Millennium Dictionary of English defines polyamory as:

"Participation in multiple and simultaneous loving or sexual relationships."

Merriam Webster's Dictionary gives the definition as:

"The state or practice of having more than one open romantic relationship at a time."

=== Scope of the term ===
No single written definition of "polyamory" has universal acceptance. Polyamory involves multiple consensual, loving relationships (or openness to such), and there is a resistance within the polyamorous community to defining it in any fixed manner. This has led to a number of problems, not the least of which is establishing a legal definition. After researching this issue in some detail, the website Polyamory Today has concluded that the unambiguous demarcation point between polyamory and other nonmonogamous relationships is the degree of interrelatedness between partners. Others suggest that one must currently be participating in multiple relationships to be considered polyamorous. Still others would consider their relational outlook polyamorous, regardless of whether they happen to be single or in an exclusive relationship at the time.

A relationship is more likely to be called "polyamorous" if at least one relationship is long-term, involves some sort of commitment (e.g., a formal ceremony), and involves shared living arrangements and/or finances, but none of these criteria are necessary or definitive.

For instance, somebody who has multiple sexual partners might form strong loving friendships with them, without feeling romantic love for them. Whether such a person identifies as "polyamorous", or as a swinger, or uses some other term, depends on the attitude of the individual. Different terms emphasise different aspects of the interaction, but "swinging" and "polyamory" are both broad in what they can refer to. This allows for a certain degree of overlap.

Similarly, an open relationship in which all participants are long-term friends might be considered "polyamorous" under broader usages of the word but excluded from some of the stricter usages (see further discussion below). There is enough overlap between these concepts that the expression "open relationship" is also sometimes used as a catch-all substitute when speaking to people who may not be familiar with the term "polyamory". However, some have objected to this shorthand, on the basis that multiple partners do not necessarily imply that they also have open relationships.

== Terms within polyamory ==
=== Core ideas ===
Compersion is when you feel happy for someone. Or more specifically in polyamory, being glad that your partner is being loved. Upon seeing your partner kiss someone else you might feel envy "I wish I could kiss them." or jealousy "they'll steal my partner away." You could also feel compersion as in "I'm glad my partner has someone to kiss." or "They're so cute together." or "They're right, my partner is so kissable." or "I'm proud of letting them love each other." Compersion, which was coined by poly people, is cited as both a core enabling emotion of polyamory and a result of engaging in polyamory.

Some polyamorists encourage jealousy to be felt, understood, thought about, reasoned with, talked about, and processed. While jealousy is a natural emotion and can be an important gut feeling, some see transforming jealousy into compersion as a useful skill or even a noble goal. This process may feel automatic or arduously difficult. Some poly people speak very highly of compersion, finding it uplifts the very concept of love. Critics of polyamory often consider the feeling unnatural or mystical. The term is related to "sympathetic joy" or "vicarious pleasure," in dharmic religions a similar feeling is called muditā.

Polycule (portmanteau of polyamory and molecule) is the term for the relationship structure or group of people in love. Sometimes this is formally mapped out and agreed upon and other times it's more loosely understood. Some polycules become tight-knit and see each other like found family.

=== Terminology describing relational structures and connections ===
The terms primary (or primary relationship) and secondary (or secondary relationship) are commonly used to briefly convey rough distinctions among relationships in a person's life. Most often, the terms are used to generally describe the type or "category" of a relationship, regarding involvement, commitment, or priority; thus, it is not uncommon to discuss having multiple primary relationships, or having only secondary relationships with no primary. The exact distinctions between these categories of relationship vary depending on the speaker, but primary usually refers to a "marriage-like" relationship in terms of living arrangements, finances, commitment or child-rearing (legal marriage or domestic partnership may or may not be involved); while secondary usually implies less of these aspects, and tertiary (which is much less used) would be still less involved or more casual.

A somewhat less common usage is to enumerate relationships by current sequential importance: the most important single relationship would be primary, the next most important would be secondary, the third would be tertiary, etc., whether deeply committed or not. Some polyamorous people, however, object to this sort of sequential "ranking".

The terms primary and secondary may refer to the relationship or, by extension, to a partner in such a relationship.

Thus, a woman with a husband and another partner might refer to the husband as her "primary" and her other partner as "secondary" – or might consider both to be primary, depending on the relationships and her usage of the terms. (Of course, this is in addition to any other terms a person might use, such as "husband", "wife", "other half", "lover", "casual date", "boyfriend", "girlfriend", "joyfriend", and so on.) Some polyamorous individuals avoid using "primary"/"secondary" descriptions, believing that all partners should be considered equally important.

Another model, sometimes referred to as intimate network, may include relationships of varying significance to the people involved. People in intimate networks may or may not explicitly label relationships primary or secondary, and hierarchies may be fluid and vague or nonexistent.

A relationship among three people is often called a triad, threesome, or throuple; among four people, a quad or a foursome. Sometimes all groupings of three or more are called moresomes.

Significant relationships involving more than two people inherently contain multiple pairs of people who may have more or less significant individual relationships with each other. Some pairs may have stronger mutual bonds than others. In triads or threesomes, the relationships may be characterized as forming a triangle or a "V". In a triangle, all three partners are directly connected and bonded to each other with roughly comparable strength. In a "V", two of the three possible pairs have substantially stronger bonds than the third pair. The emotional and sexual aspects of a relationship may differ in this regard, so an example can describe a relationship as a triangle emotionally but a V sexually. The connecting member of a V relationship is sometimes referred to as a "hinge" or "pivot", and the partners thereby indirectly connected may be referred to as the "arms".

There are also by analogy other "letter" descriptions such as "N" or "U" foursome, or "W" fivesome geometries ("Z" and "M" are equivalents to "N" and "W" in this regard), each attempting to symbolize the more significant bonds within a group by analogy to the shape of the letter; of course, not all combinations have easy letter shape analogs.

Couples that choose to betray and cheat each other intentionally, either in a DADT (don't ask don't tell) model or not, is another common experience that was denominated as tolyamory, termed in a podcast by Dan Savage, in which partners ignore infidelities.

=== Terminology related to polyamorous vs. open relationships ===
An open relationship generally denotes a relationship (usually between two people, but sometimes among larger groups) in which participants may have sexual involvement with other people, with the consent of their partner(s). Where a couple making this agreement is married, it is an open marriage. "Open relationship" and "polyamorous" are overlapping rather than identical terms; people may use either or both terms in describing their relationship. Broadly, "open" usually refers to the sexual aspect of a non-closed relationship, whereas polyamory involves the extension of a relationship by allowing bonds to form (which may be sexual or otherwise) as additional long-term relationships:

- Some non-monogamous relationships place sexual restrictions on partners (e.g. polyfidelity); such relationships may be polyamorous, but not open.
- Some relationships permit sex outside the primary relationship, but not love (cf. swinging); such relationships are open, but not polyamorous.
- Some polyamorists do not accept the dichotomies of "in a relationship/not in a relationship" and "partners/not partners"; without these divisions, it is meaningless to class a relationship as "open" and "closed".
- Many polyamorists consider "polyamorous" to be their (emotional/philosophical) relationship orientation (just as "gay" and "straight" are sexual orientations)—they identify as poly (one capable and desirous of multiple loves)—whereas "open relationship" is used as a logistical description: that is, it describes a particular form of relationship, sometimes employed by polys. They might say of themselves, for instance, "I am polyamorous (or "I'm poly"); my primary partner and I have an open relationship..."

See also forms of non-monogamy for other types of non-monogamous relationships (not all of them polyamorous).

=== Role terminology ===
- Co-parent – raising one or more children together.
- Nesting partner – intending to live together in the long-term; not necessarily in the same bed, but possibly commitment is prioritized over passion.
- Non-nesting (or satellite) partner – long-term secondary arrangement with physical and emotional intimacy.
- Swinging partner – arrangement with physical and emotional intimacy; oriented around safe, sex-positive exploration of self.
- Comet partner – a person with whom you have an intermittent, mostly long-distance relationship.
- Metamour – someone who is a polyamorous partner's partner that they have no romantic relationship with. This can be their partner's other girlfriend or boyfriend, or their partner's spouse.

=== Miscellaneous terminology ===
New relationship energy, or NRE, is the surge of emotional and sexual openness and excitement usually experienced in relatively new relationships, with recognition of the contrast with the more settled emotional and erotic connections experienced later in the same relationship, or in other ongoing relationships at the same time.

Kitchen table refers to an emotionally open and intimate set of polyamorous relationships.

Ambiamory is the capability of experiencing and enjoying monogamous and polyamorous relationships.

Symbiosexual is a sexual identity where individuals are attracted to the synergy and charisma of established couples, rather than to individuals.

== See also ==
- Free love
- Relationship anarchy
- Solo poly
- Sologamy
- Unicorn hunting
