= Polyamory in the United States =

Polyamory in the United States is the practice of, or the desire for, romantic relationships with more than one partner at the same time, with the informed consent of all partners involved, in the United States. Polyamory is a relationship type that is practiced by a minority of the population in the United States, about 4 to 5 percent. According to a 2016 study, 20 percent of singles in the US have attempted some form of consensual non-monogamy at some point of their lives, such as polyamory or open relationships. In a study, polyamorous couples tend to identify as bisexual and pansexual.

== Acceptance ==
Polyamory is a subset of ethical non-monogamy (ENM), also known as consensual non-monogamy, in which one or more members in a relationship engage in a relationship with two or more people. Individuals in polyamorous relationships are more likely to identify as bisexual or pansexual than heterosexual. Surveys show that only half of all American millennials and gen z want a completely monogamous relationship. In January 2018, BET reported that polyamory was growing within the African American community.

In 2021, research conducted with more than 3,000 Americans, found that 16.8% of those surveyed "desire[d] to engage in polyamory", 10.7% of those surveyed had "engaged in polyamory at some point during their life," while 6.5% of those surveyed said they knew someone who had been "or is currently engaged in polyamory" and noted among those not interested in polyamory, 14.2% stated they "respect people who engage in polyamory." The Austin Institute for the Study of Family and Culture stated that one in 6 Americans find polyamory to be socially acceptable. Men are more likely than women (21% versus 13%) to accept polyamory. A 2023 survey by YouGov found that 34% of Americans describe their ideal relationship as something other than completely monogamous.

In a survey of 5,885 non-monogamous respondents in 2025, Only 24% of respondents identified as heterosexual/straight and 71% identified as cisgender. 54% identified as polyamorous, with most not being fully open about their relationship status, especially to their work supervisors or landlords. 61% reported experiencing prejudice and discrimination.

== Legal issues and legal recognition ==
In 1998, a Tennessee court granted guardianship of a child to her grandmother and step-grandfather after the child's mother April Divilbiss and partners outed themselves as polyamorous on MTV. After contesting the decision for two years, Divilbiss eventually agreed to relinquish her daughter, acknowledging that she was unable to adequately care for her child and that this, rather than her polyamory, had been the grandparents' real motivation in seeking custody.

In 2010, Ann Tweedy, a legal scholar, argued that polyamory could be considered a sexual orientation under existing United States law. This argument was opposed by Christian Keese, who wrote in 2016 that advocating a "sexual orientation model of polyamory is likely to reduce the complexity and transformative potential of poly intimacies", while also limiting reach and scope of possible litigation, obstruct the ability of poly activists to form alliances with other groups, and increase the possibility that poly activists will have to settle for legal solutions which are "exclusive and reproductive of a culture of privilege".

In 2016, writer Rebecca Ruth Gould called for non-monogamy, including polyamory, to receive "the legal recognition it deserves", saying that polyamory remains a "negative identity".

In November 2020, the issue of polyamory came to the Supreme Court of Vermont in the form of a dispute between two men and a woman in a polyamorous relationship.

=== California ===
In 2017, three men became the first family in the state of California to have names of three dads "on their child's birth certificate."

In November 2026, West Hollywood, California created a domestic partnership registry recognizing polyamorous relationships.

In California, legislation has been passed banning discrimination based on family and relationship structure in businesses, civil services, and housing in:

- Oakland (April 2024)
- Berkeley (May 2024)
- West Hollywood (March 2026)

=== Massachusetts ===
- In June 2020, the city council of Somerville, Massachusetts voted to recognize polyamorous domestic partnerships in the city, becoming the first American city to do so. This measure was passed so that those in a polyamorous relationship would have access to their partners' health insurance, amid the COVID-19 pandemic. In March 2023, the Somerville council passed an ordinance prohibiting discrimination against polyamorous people in employment and policing.
- In March 2021, the Cambridge, Massachusetts City Council approved an ordinance amending the city's laws, stipulating that "a domestic partnership needn't only include two partners." The measure was supported by the Polyamory Legal Advocacy Coalition, also known as PLAC, composed of the Chosen Family Law Center, Harvard Law School LGBTQ+ Advocacy Clinic, and some members on the American Psychological Association's Committee on Consensual Non-Monogamy. This ordinance was originally proposed in July 2020.
- In April 2021, the adjacent town of Arlington, Massachusetts also approved domestic partnerships of more than two people, which was later approved by the state Attorney General (Maura Healey)'s office.

=== Other states ===
- In March 2026, Portland, Oregon passed an ordinance protecting polyamorous people and households with multiple partners from discrimination in public accommodation, jobs, and housing.
- In February 2026, Olympia, Washington's city council members voted unanimously to add "diverse family and relationship structures" to the city’s antidiscrimination law and its unfair housing practices law.
- In June 2026, Hazel Park, Michigan amended its civil rights ordinance to add protections for familial status, family or relationship structure.
- In September 2026, Seattle, Washington passed a bill that extended protection to both non-monogamous people and multigenerational households.

=== Polling ===
A 2022 survey found that 30% of U.S. adults supported giving polyamorous people equal legal protection with monogamous people, with 40% opposing. The 18 to 44 age group had the highest level of support at 42%, while 52% of respondents aged 65+ were opposed.

== Polyamory rights organizations ==
Loving More was an American non-profit organization formed to support and advocate on behalf of polyamorous people. Founded in 1984, Loving More claimed to be the oldest and longest-running polyamory organization; Loving More became inactive in March 2024.

The Organization for Polyamory and Ethical Non-monogamy (OPEN) was founded in the United States in 2022 as "a nonprofit organization dedicated to normalizing and empowering non-monogamous individuals and communities."

The Polyamory Legal Advocacy Coalition (PLAC), based in the United States, "seeks to advance the civil and human rights of polyamorous individuals, communities, and families through legislative advocacy, public policy, and public education."
