= Senior Love Triangle =

2019 film by Kelly Blatz

- Directed by: Kelly Blatz
- Written by: Kelly Blatz; Isadora Kosofsky
- Produced by: Drew Diamond; Matthew Smaglik; Jenna Cavelle; Lori Tanner
- Starring: Tom Bower; Marlyn Mason; Anne Gee Byrd
- Cinematography: Jon Keng
- Edited by: Kelly Blatz; Seth Clark
- Music by: Nami Melumad
- Production companies: Dow Jazz Films; Red Green Blue; Her Pictures; No Label Productions
- Distributed by: Gravitas Ventures
- Release date: August 6, 2019 (RIIF)
- Running time: 92 minutes
- Country: United States
- Language: English

Senior Love Triangle is a 2019 romantic drama film directed by Kelly Blatz, in his feature film directorial debut.

== Plot ==
A polyamorous relationship unexpectedly happens between Adina, Jeanie, and 84-year-old WWII veteran William. Adina and Jeanie agree to this arrangement with William out of their love for him and because they do not want to be alone.

The events in the film are inspired by a true story and co-writer Isadora Kosofsky's long-term photo essay of the same name.

== Cast ==
- Tom Bower as William Selig
- Marlyn Mason as Jeanie
- Anne Gee Byrd as Adina
- Travis Van Winkle as Spencer
- Matt Bush as Ignacio
- Carrie Gibson as Samantha
- Noah Weisberg as Thomas
- Michelle Bonilla as Julia
- Loren Lester as David
- Bryan Fisher as Jake
- Lee de Broux as Hank
- Michael Lanahan as U-Haul Employee
- Ricky Montez as Ricky
- Brandon Sutton as Security Guard
- Tyrone Evans Clark as Mental Ward Patient
- Robert Maffia as Ron
- Duane Taniguchi as Donut Shop Owner
- Nicole Starrett as Hospital Security
- Chantal Nchako as Instructor
- Allyson Reilly as Ice Cream Employee
- Al Troupe as Al Troupe
- Carlton Fluker as Doctor Hill
- R. Sky Palkowitz as Server
- Chris Yonan as Than

== Production ==
Kelly Blatz directed the film, with former NBA player Baron Davis being one of the executive producers.

== Release ==
The film was distributed by Gravitas Ventures with a runtime of 1 hour and 32 minutes. It became available on DVD in 2019, and was released on August 4, 2020, on VOD / Digital release.

== Critical reception ==
The film has an approval rating of 100% based on 8 professional reviews on the review aggregator website Rotten Tomatoes.

== Adaptation ==
After the film was released in 2020, a book inspired by the film was created containing photos of elderly people practicing polyamory.
