= Deborah Anapol =

American psychologist (1951–2015)

Deborah Taj Anapol
- Born: 1951
- Died: 18 August 2015 (aged 63–64)
- Citizenship: United States
- Education: University of California, Berkeley (1975); University of Washington (PhD 1981); Barnard College
- Occupations: Clinical psychologist, writer
- Known for: Polyamory, neotantra

Deborah Taj Anapol (1951–2015) was an American clinical psychologist and one of the founders of the polyamory movement, which started in the 1980s. She died unexpectedly in England on 18 August 2015.

== Work ==
Known for her work in erotic spirituality, ecosex, neotantra and Pelvic-Heart Integration, she was an advocate for multiple love and sacred sexuality. Her work made early use of the Internet to gather and organize like-minded people.

She was also the co-founder of the magazine Loving More and its conferences. She wrote one of the first books on polyamory, Love Without Limits (1992); which was expanded and reissued as Polyamory: The New Love Without Limits, in 1997. An expert columnist for Psychology Today, she blogged at "Love Without Limits, Reports from the relationship frontier."

Anapol was a pioneer in opening the way for diversity of form in healthy relationships, and received the "Vicki" Award from the Woodhull Freedom Foundation for her work affirming sexual freedom as a fundamental human rights.

Anapol appeared on radio and television shows, such as Donahue, Leeza, Real Personal, Jerry Springer, and Sally Jesse Raphael. She taught workshops internationally in subjects such as Pelvic-Heart Integration and Polyamory.

Pelvic-Heart Integration (PHI) is a synthesis of neo-Reichian breathwork, body work, energy work, psychodrama, trauma work, body reading and neotantra and was developed by bodyworker Dr. Jack Painter, of which Anapol was a certified practitioner.

== Bibliography ==
Anapol was the author of several books:

- Polyamory: The New Love Without Limits. 1997. ISBN 978-1-880-78908-7. OCLC 37969216.
- Anapol, Deborah M. (1992). Love Without Limits. ISBN 978-1-880-78906-3. OCLC 25575629.
- Compersion: Meditations on Using Jealousy as a Path to Unconditional Love. 2004. ISBN 1-880-78902-7. (eBook)
- Anapol, Deborah Taj (2005). The Seven Natural Laws of Love. ISBN 978-0-971-08887-0. OCLC 59712222.
- Anapol, Deborah (2010). Polyamory in the 21st Century. ISBN 978-1-442-20023-4. OCLC 694791334.

Anapol also created a three-part DVD video, Pelvic-Heart Integration.
