= Unicorn hunting =

Seeking of a third partner by a couple

Unicorn hunting is the practice by two people who are in a relationship, usually a heterosexual couple, of seeking a third partner for the relationship temporarily or permanently, usually a bisexual—though occasionally, a lesbian—woman, either to join a threesome or to start a polyamorous relationship. The practice is generally viewed negatively by the polyamorous and LGBT community as a form of fetishisation.

== Term ==
The term "unicorn hunting" comes from, comparable with the legendary creature, how rare a bisexual woman willing to join an existing couple is, as well as their conditions, which can include relational exclusivity (contrary to open relationships with other people), equal attraction to both partners or interest in only having group sex. Its use might have started in the 1970s by swinger communities of the time to describe bisexual women available to have a threesome with a heterosexual couple.

== Practice ==
Unicorn hunting consists of two people in a relationship, usually a heterosexual couple of a man and a woman, seeking a bisexual woman for the relationship, either to join a threesome or to form a polyamorous relationship. Some unicorn hunters may also look for lesbians in addition to bisexual women. Unicorn polyamory is different from a triad or throuple relationship in that in a throuple, the three members are all equal partners, while a "unicorn" joins an existing couple, typically as a secondary partner. In a triad, rules are usually agreed upon by all members, whereas in unicorn polyamory, it is assumed that the couple makes the rules, while the unicorn has to follow them.

The practice is often seen negatively by the polyamorous and LGBT communities due to the power imbalance in the relationship, and is considered to contribute to the fetishisation of bisexual women. Some women who self-identify as unicorns defend the practice, which tends to receive pushback from the community. Unicorns and unicorn hunters are sometimes considered not really polyamorous by the community.

Couples looking for a third partner might do it by using dating apps or websites. Vogue India also cited a distinction between "hunters" and "retrievers", where in the latter, women find a person for predatory men.
