= Unitarian Universalists for Polyamory Awareness =

Independent advocacy organization

- Abbreviation: UUPA
- Formation: 2001 General Assembly in Cleveland
- Type: religious organization polyamory awareness
- Location: United States
- Key people: UUPA Board of Trustees
- Website: https://www.uucards.org/polyamory.php

Unitarian Universalists for Polyamory Awareness (UUPA) is an independent organization of Unitarian Universalists seeking to promote greater understanding and acceptance of polyamory within the Unitarian Universalist Association and its member congregations.

== History ==
UUPA's first official membership meeting was held at the 2001 General Assembly (GA) in Cleveland, electing a permanent board of trustees and ratifying incorporation and by-laws.

UUPA continued to have a presence at annual General Assemblies, principally with information booths, but also holding formal workshops on polyamory at four GAs. In 2013, they released a curriculum on polyamory for congregations: "Love Makes a Family." At the 2014 General Assembly, two UUPA members moved to include the category of "family and relationship structures" in the UUA's nondiscrimination rule, along with other amendments; the package of proposed amendments was ratified by the GA delegates. While this has encouraged UUPA's membership, the UUA itself has yet to take specific action towards assuring greater awareness and inclusion of polyamorous people.

== Organization ==
Members of the UUPA's board of trustees are elected by the membership, which meets annually. The organization also has local chapters, as well as individual contact persons in some places where there is no active chapter present. While UUPA is independent of the UUA, it is currently listed as a related organization on the UUA website.

== Activities ==
UUPA provides presentations, educational materials and literature for Unitarian Universalist congregations, ministers and educators. Its leadership has also worked closely with other Unitarian Universalist organizations, such as Interweave Continental (which works on LGBTQ issues within the UUA) and Leather & Grace (which, before it ended, promoted awareness among UUs on BDSM and kink sexuality).
