= Polycule =

Group of people connected by overlapping romantic relationships

In polyamory, a polycule is a group of individuals involved in romantic relationships that connect all the members in the group. It is neither necessary nor common for every individual of the polycule to be in a relationship with every other individual. The most simple and arguably most common polycule structure is a V-shaped structure: a three-person polycule where one person is dating the two others, but the two others are not dating one another.

== Etymology ==
Derived as an analog to the way that atomic bonds connect the atoms in a molecule, the word is a portmanteau of polyamory and molecule.

The origin of the term is not clear, but it seems to have entered the popular lexicon starting in the early 2010s. By the 2020s, discussions of polycules had entered the mainstream media.

A polycule is a relationship cluster: If one plots something like that it looks like e.g. an oxygen compound, like a molecule. Therefore the name. The balls are the persons involved and the width of the connection symbolises the intensity of the relation between those persons.
Stefan Ossmann, Polyamorie researcher, University Vienna, 2018

== Terms ==
While polycules can take on many different configurations, there are a few common structures and terms.

Some of these structures are tileable (e.g. a V that one of the branches is in another V structure)

- V structure describes a three-person polycule where one person is dating the two others, but the two others are not dating one another.
- N structure describes a four-person polycule where each couple contributes one person to a third relationship. It takes its name from the letter "N", since each line represents a relationship, and each end point represents an individual.
- Throuple describes a group of three people where all individuals are in a relationship with the other two people in the group. It is also known as a type of triad.
- Quad describes a four-person polycule. While all N structures are quads, not all quads are N structures.
- Metamour is a term that refers to one's partner's partner.

== See also ==
- Connectivity (graph theory)
