= Polyday =

One-day convention/conference held in the UK, celebrating polyamory

PolyDay is a one-day convention/conference held in the UK, celebrating polyamory. Polyday began in 2004 and was held nearly annually until its cancellation in 2020 and 2021 on account of the COVID-19 pandemic before it was placed on hiatus in 2022. Polyday returned in 2026 on 19 September at Wilditch Community Centre in Battersea, London. The event consists of workshops and discussions during the day and social events in the evening. In 2012 it became associated with the international event, Poly Party Weekend. In 2016, Polyday became an unincorporated charitable association.

The content of each Polyday differs slightly each year. Features that are consistent included a basic introduction to polyamory, useful literature, people to chat to, arts/crafts. Other sessions such as activism, poly parenting, relationship styles and mental/sexual health have been offered.

The conference is open to anyone, regardless of relationship status, provided they are open and accepting of other attendees. Strict rules apply to photography and members of the press who wish to attend, so as to protect the privacy of other attendees.

Polyday 2022 was scheduled to be held on 15 October 2022, at Resource for London. But, due to reported threats against speakers and controversy stemming from a committee member's close relationship with Franklin Veaux, Polyday was cancelled. The organizers, who had been managing the event since 2015, stated in the cancellation statement that they are seeking a new team to carry on managing the event.

Polyday returned on 19 September 2026 with a mix of old and new committee members, at the venue used from 2016-2019 (Wilditch Community Centre, Battersea, London).

== Past events ==
The first Polyday in 2004 was held at the Leicester LGB Centre. Following this, every other event happened in London, since 2006 – except for the 2010 event, held in Bristol. Polyday 2020 and 2021 were cancelled due to the novel coronavirus pandemic and Polyday 2022 was cancelled along with an indefinite pause on the event until it returned in 2026.

Event	Dates	Venue	Attendance
PolyDay – Leicester	30 October 2004	Leicester Lesbian Gay & Bisexual Centre	60+
Polyday 2006	14 October 2006	Doggett's Coat and Badge, Blackfriars Bridge, London	100+
Polyday 2007	22 September 2007	Doggett's Coat and Badge, Blackfriars Bridge, London	100+
Polyday 2008	13–14 September 2008	Doggett's Coat and Badge, Blackfriars Bridge, London	100+
Polyday 2009	26 September 2009	Dragon Hall, London	100+
Polyday 2010	20 November 2010	The Trinity Centre, Bristol	150+
Polyday 2011	27 August 2011	Dragon Hall, London	200+
Polyday 2012	16 June 2012	Dragon Hall, London	???
Polyday 2015	17 October 2015	Open Door Community Centre, London	170
Polyday 2016	8 October 2016	Wilditch Community Centre, London	160
Polyday 2017	7 October 2017	Wilditch Community Centre, London	194
Polyday 2018	13 October 2018	Wilditch Community Centre, London	254
Polyday 2019	12 October 2019	Wilditch Community Centre, London	180+
Polyday 2026	19 September 2026	Wilditch Community Centre, London	130+

== See also ==
- Polyamory
