= Relationship anarchy =

Belief that relationships should be unbound by rules except those with a mutual agreement

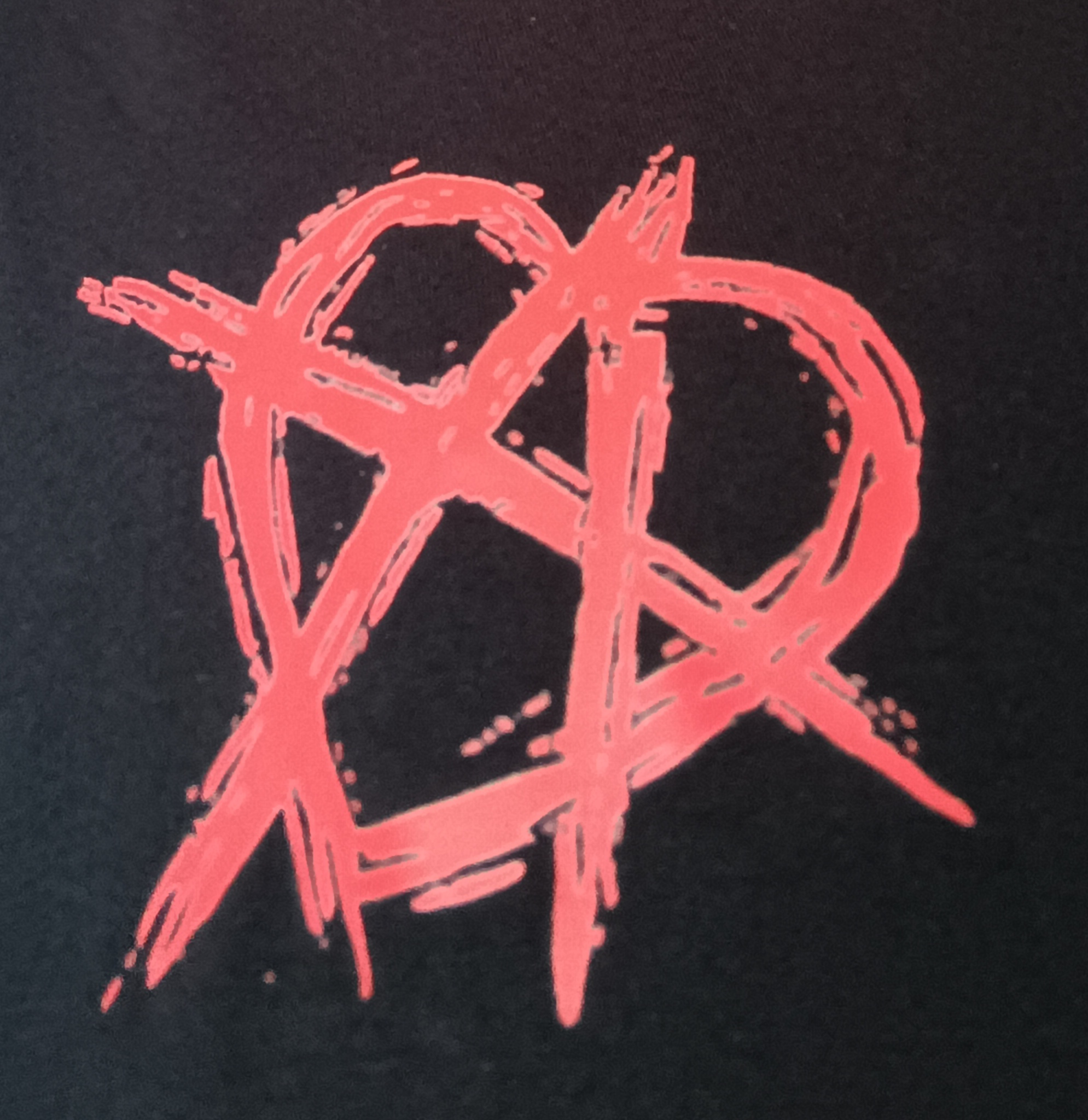
Relationship anarchy symbol

Relationship anarchy (sometimes abbreviated RA) is the application of anarchist principles to interpersonal relationships. Its values include autonomy, anti-hierarchical practices, anti-normativity, and community interdependence. RA is explicitly anti-amatonormative and anti-mononormative and is commonly, but not always, non-monogamous. This is distinct from polyamory, solo poly, swinging, and other forms of "dating", which may include structures such as amatonormativity, hierarchy of intimate relationships, and autonomy-limiting rules. It has also been interpreted as a new paradigm in which closeness and autonomy are no longer considered to create dilemmas within a relationship.

== History ==
Andie Nordgren popularized the term "relationship anarchy" in her 2012 Tumblr essay "The short instructional manifesto for relationship anarchy", which she translated from her own Swedish-language "Relationsanarki i 8 punkter" (lit. Relationship anarchy in 8 points). Other relevant writings exploring this topic within a similar time frame include "A Green Anarchist Project on Freedom and Love" and "Against the Couple Form". RA has also been discussed in the academic literature, for example by Roma De las Heras Gómez.

Workshops at OpenCon 2010 discussed relationship anarchy, and the Open University professor Dr. Meg-John Barker discussed it in a 2013 presentation. In the International Non-Monogamies and Contemporary Intimacies conferences, since 2016, different aspects of relationship anarchy have been studied. In March 2020, the first book dedicated monographically to relationship anarchy was published in Spanish Anarquía Relacional. La revolución desde los vínculos [Relationship Anarchy: Revolution Through Connections] translated into English in 2022 and published as Relationship Anarchy. Occupy Intimacy.

The general press has dealt with relationship anarchy in articles with different approaches and scopes. In 2021, Cosmopolitan magazine describes it as a distinct relational style, remarking on the importance it assigns to needs, boundaries and expectations, and quoting experts such as Dr. Heath Schechinger, co-chair of the American Psychological Association Division 44 Committee on Consensual Non-Monogamy and other authors and practitioners. On April 13, 2022, an article in Men's Health magazine emphasizes how to put the philosophy of relationship anarchy into practice and how it leads us not to hierarchize between platonic and romantic relationships. It even extends that to deeply loving relationships with non-humans: the environment, pets, God or spirituality, art, music, or even football clubs.

On June 17, 2022, an article in The New York Times stated that The Organization for Polyamory and Ethical Non-monogamy, or OPEN, sent an open letter to Meta calling for Facebook to allow users to list more than one relationship status in their profiles, including "polyamory", "swinging", and "relationship anarchy". On February 8, 2023, The Observer, in the article "We Can All Learn From Polyamory", the nine statements that make up the relationship anarchy manifesto are proposed as pillars of any type relationship. It is compared to polyamory that is said to fall under the umbrella of ethical non-monogamy, identified as the set of all nontraditional connections made between more than two people. Relationship anarchy is regarded as more of a philosophy, comprising values that encourage people to form relationships based on their own wants and needs rather than traditional social rules.

== See also ==
- Anarcha-feminism
- Anarchism and issues related to love and sex
- Anarchism § Gender, sexuality, and free love
- Queer anarchism
