= Loving More =

Polyamory non-profit organization

Loving More Nonprofit Inc.
- Formation: 1984; 42 years ago (as PEP)
- Founder: Ryam Nearing
- Type: Nonprofit advocacy organization
- Purpose: "To educate people about and support polyamory as a valid choice in loving relationships and family lifestyle."
- Headquarters: Loveland, CO
- Executive Director: Robyn Trask
- Website: www.lovingmorenonprofit.org

Loving More was an American non-profit organization formed to support and advocate on behalf of polyamorous people.

The organization began as Polyfidelitous Educational Products, officially founded in Eugene, Oregon, in the fall of 1984 by Ryam Nearing and her two male partners. They published the subscription-supported newsletter PEPtalk, and launched a series of casual get-togethers in their hometown for nonmonogamous people, which eventually expanded to include annual retreats at Harbin Hot Springs.

After relocation to Captain Cook, Hawaii, the dissolution of the original triad, and conversion to polyamory, PEP was moved to Colorado. With encouragement from Robert Rimmer, author of The Harrad Experiment, and others attending the fall East Coast Conference in 1994, Nearing joined with Deborah Anapol of the pro-polyfidelity IntiNet Resource Center to form Loving More magazine and conferences. Nearing filed a trademark application for "Loving More" in 1998, and was granted the trademark in 1999.

Anapol left the organization in 1996 to pursue other interests, including publishing one of the first books on polyamory, Love Without Limits. Mary Wolf took over as Managing Editor in 2001; in 2004, Robyn Trask became Managing Editor. Trask incorporated Loving More as a not-for-profit corporation, with the intent to eventually become a non-profit 501(c)(3) charitable organization. The organization ran conferences and retreats since the mid-eighties in order to educate and support people in multi-partnered families and relationships.

The three most visible projects of Loving More were Loving More magazine, the Loving More website and two annual Loving More conferences, one on the east coast and the other on the west coast of the United States. Despite long hiatuses in publishing and outreach work, Loving More claimed to be the oldest and longest-running polyamory organization, with over 3,000 members.

In recent years, Loving More ceased magazine publication, shifting focus to a push for polyamory awareness by reaching out to therapists, doctors, lawyers and media to educate the public to possibilities beyond monogamy in loving relationships.

Loving More became inactive in March 2024.
