= Polyamory =

Consensual intimacy with multiple partners

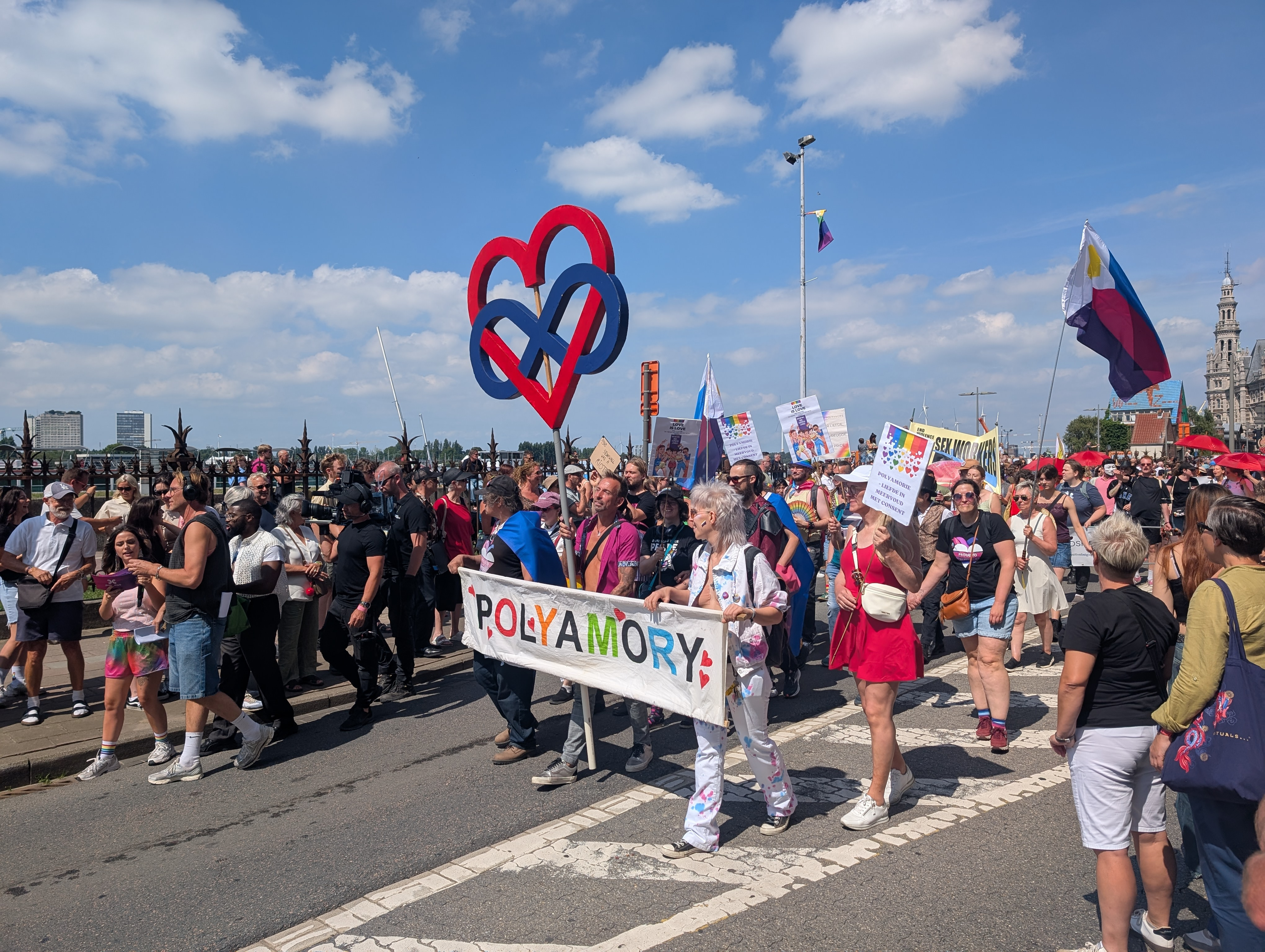
- Polyamorous people parading under an infinity heart at Antwerp Pride 2025.
- Parent category: Non-monogamy
- Subcategories: Polyfidelity; Solo poly

Other terms
- Associated terms: Relationship anarchy; Ethical non-monogamy; Ambiamory; Free love

Polyamory (from Ancient Greek πολύς (polús) 'many' and Latin amor 'love') is the practice or support of maintaining committed, romantic, and/or sexual relationships with more than one partner, in parallel or concurrently, with the consent of all involved partners. Polyamory allows for ethical-non-monogamy (ENM), which is a subset of the broader consensual non-monogamy. Many people who identify as polyamorous believe in a conscious management of jealousy and reject the view that sexual and relational exclusivity (monogamy) are prerequisites for deep, committed, long-term, loving relationships. When members of a closed polyamorous relationship restrict their sexual activity to only members of that group, that is commonly referred to as polyfidelity.

Polyamory has been used as an umbrella term for various forms of non-monogamous, multi-partner relationships, or non-exclusive sexual or romantic relationships. Identifying with polyamory reflects the choices and philosophies of the individuals involved, but with recurring themes or values; such as love, intimacy, honesty, integrity, equality, communication, and commitment. It can often be distinguished from some other forms of ethical non-monogamy in that the relationships involved are loving intimate relationships, as opposed to purely sexual relationships.

The term polyamory was coined in 1990 and listed by the Oxford English Dictionary in 2006. It is considered a queer identity rather than a sexuality or gender identity; as such it is not part of the LGBT umbrella but is included in the wider LGBTQ umbrella. While mainstream Christianity and Judaism generally reject polyamory, it has been supported by Hinduism and several smaller religions. In clinical settings, therapists are encouraged to recognize diverse relationship structures such as polyamory, address biases toward monogamy, and utilize specialized resources to support polyamorous clients.

From the 1970s onward, polyamory has been depicted in various media, including Isaac Asimov’s works, DC Comics’ Starfire, The Wheel of Time series, Futurama, and numerous 21st-century television shows and novels. Polyamory-related observances include Metamour Day on February 28, Polyamory Pride Day on June 11th during Pride Month, International Solo Polyamory Day on September 24, and Polyamory Day on November 23. Polyamory groups often participate in pride parades. Worldwide nonprofits like Loving More and others advocate for polyamory rights, acceptance, and education. Critics argue that polyamory is not inherently radical, often reflects privilege, and may have negative social impacts. Notable individuals publicly identifying as polyamorous include authors Dossie Easton, Janet Hardy, and Laurell K. Hamilton; filmmaker Terisa Greenan; actress Jena Malone, activist Brenda Howard, musicians Janelle Monáe, Willow Smith and journalist Quinn Norton.

== Terminology ==
The word polyamorous first appeared in an article by Morning Glory Zell-Ravenheart, "A Bouquet of Lovers", published in May 1990 in Green Egg Magazine, as "poly-amorous". In May 1992, Jennifer L. Wesp created the Usenet newsgroup alt.polyamory, and the Oxford English Dictionary (OED) cites the proposal to create that group as the first verified appearance of the word. In 1999, Zell-Ravenheart was asked by the editor of the OED to provide a definition of the term, and she provided it for the UK version as "the practice, state or ability of having more than one sexual loving relationship at the same time, with the full knowledge and consent of all partners involved." The words polyamory, polyamorous, and polyamorist were added to the OED in 2006.

Some reference works define polyamory as a relational form (whether interpersonal or romantic or sexual) that involves multiple people with the consent of all the people involved, like Oxford Living Dictionaries, Cambridge Advanced Learner's Dictionary and Thesaurus, and Dictionary.com. Some criticized the Merriam-Webster definition of polyamory, which defines the term as "the state or practice of having more than one open romantic relationship at a time," as missing a "vital component": consent.

=== Relationship to LGBTQ umbrella ===
In a strict definitional sense, polyamory is not generally included in the LGBT umbrella because it is neither a sexuality nor a gender identity. However, it is considered a queer identity; implying a place in the wider LGBTQ umbrella. Polyamory is also more prevalent among LGBT people. Historic LGBT rights movements such as the Radical Faeries sought to support non-monogamous relationships in addition to advocating for the rights of same-sex couples.

== History ==
Most animals exhibit promiscuity, polygyny, polyandry, or polygynandry when it comes to mate selection. Gibbons, the primates that are the most monogamous, usually engage in serial monogamy but do occasionally have multiple concurrent mates. It's theorized that this monogamy is enforced via territorial disputes and violence. Bonobos and Chimpanzees, the closest living relatives to humans, are not monogamous. Polyamory has been found in multiple disparate cultures and is often thought to be innate to human nature. 87% of pre-industrial societies had some form of polyamory or polygamy and it may have pre-dated monamory (single partner relationships).

While Christianity has largely been opposed to it, there are examples in other cultures that meet the consent definition of polyamory. This includes Hindu traditions such as Sambandam; non-monogamy was likely tolerated in India from antiquity to the colonial era. Polygamous unions in Islam have often been depicted as sexist or patriarchal in contrast to more equitable polyamorous relationships, but this characterization has been criticised as oversimplified and islamophobic. Polyamorous traditions were also present in native American groups such as the Tupikawahih people. A 1990 study of pre-colonial Polynesian cultures examined relationship structures across 127 groups; it found that consensual non-monogamy was the norm among 97 of them. As a general rule, "taking another sexual partner usually was acceptable if the first mate knew about the relationship and sanctioned it." Such arrangements were confusing to European colonists; in India the British outright set out to suppress non-monogamous traditions.

In the western world, experts largely agree that the 1960s free love movement laid the foundations for the 2000s and 2010s rise in polyamory. Some sexual scholars also cite the new woman who emerged in the roaring twenties as being highly related alongside the 1930's sexual liberation in Germany. The term polyamory was coined in 1990 as a way for people to describe what they had already been choosing to do for decades. Contemporary or previous writing often used other terms including triad, ménage à trois, open marriage, open relationship, arrangement, and polyfidelity. Multiple researchers have found the rate of privately agreed on open relationships to be much higher than the rate of publicly announced ones. As with other queer styles of love, this results in a false characterization that polyamory is new and rare. Polyamory is seen as both separate from and related to feminism, queer theory, and humanism.

== As a practice ==
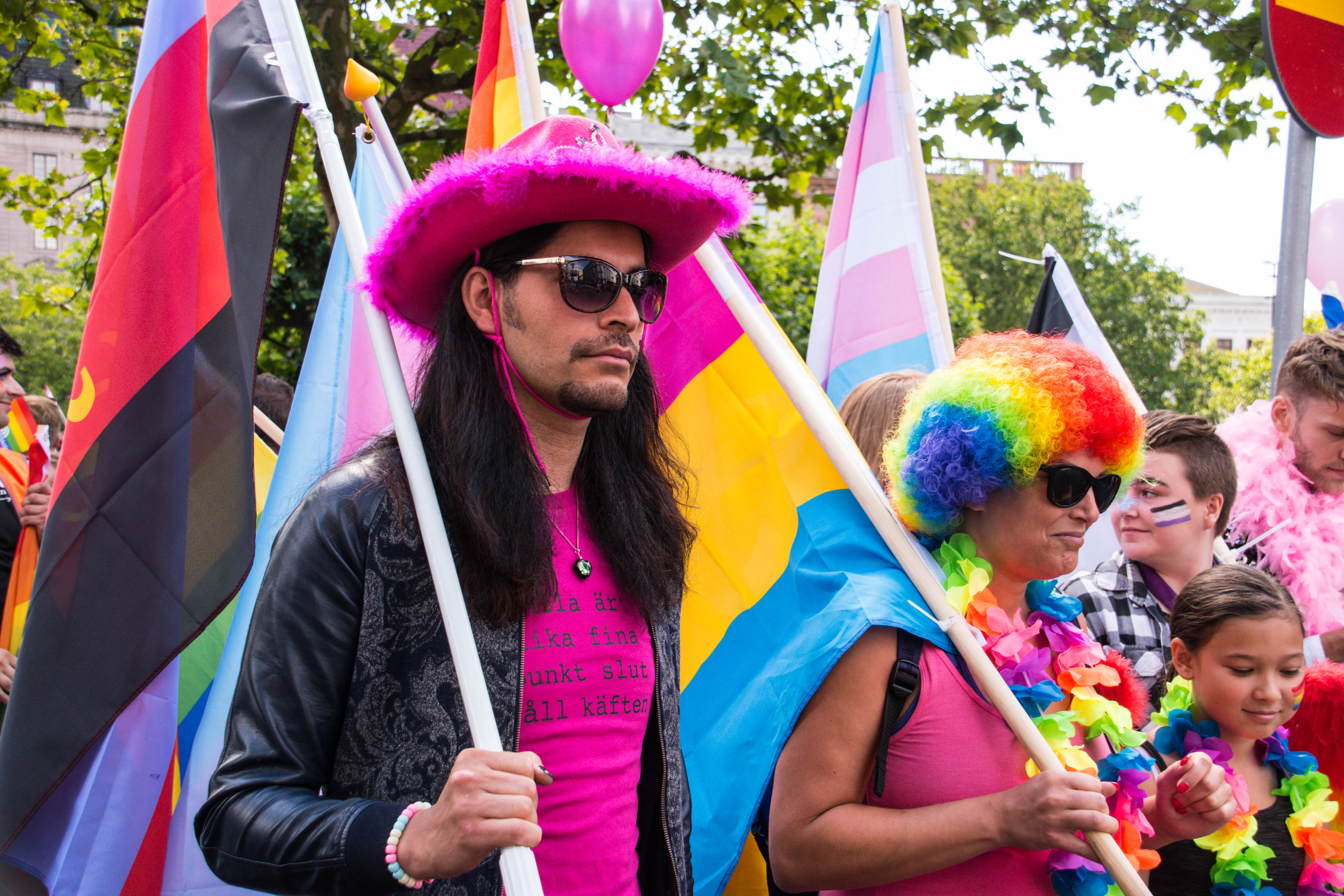
A demonstrator (left) with a polyamorous pride flag in Malmö, Sweden, August 2017

Consensual non-monogamy, which polyamory falls under, can take many different forms, depending on the needs and preferences of the individuals involved in any specific relationship. As of 2019, over one-fifth of single Americans have, at some point in their lives, engaged in some sort of consensual non-monogamy.

Separate from polyamory as a philosophical basis for relationships are the practical ways in which people who live polyamorously arrange their lives and handle specific issues compared to those of a more conventional monogamous arrangement. People of different sexual orientations are a part of the community and form networks of relationships with the consent and agreement of their partners. Many things differentiate polyamory from other types of non-monogamous relationships. It is common for swinging and open couples to maintain emotional monogamy while engaging in extra-dyadic sexual relations.

The friend or partner boundary in monogamous relationships and other forms of non-monogamy is typically fairly clear. Unlike other forms of non-monogamy, "polyamory is notable for privileging emotional intimacy with others." Benefits of a polyamorous relationship might include: the ability to discuss issues with multiple partners, potentially mediating and thus stabilizing a relationship, reducing polarization of viewpoints, and emotional support and structure from other committed adults within the familial unit. Other benefits include a wider range of adult experience, skills, resources, perspectives. Some seek to open an existing relationship, even a marriage, in hopes that it will strengthen or preserve it. Core to this idea is the understanding that each relationship is unique and possibly complementary. As an example, someone who feels strong friendship and sexual chemistry with her partner but longs for romance the partner has no interest in could find an additional partner who is romantic.

The Kinsey Institute for Research in Sex, Gender and Reproduction estimated that there were half a million "openly polyamorous families" in the United States in 2009. Additionally, 15–28% of heterosexual couples and about half of gay and bisexual people have a "non-traditional" arrangement of some kind as reported in The Guardian in 2013. Polyamorous communities have been said to be outwardly feminist as women were central to the creation of such communities with gender equality as a central tenet. For those who are polyamorous, social distancing, as a result of the COVID-19 pandemic, created ripples in existing relationships, leading some to split apart and others to struggle to maintain their connections with one another.

=== Fidelity and loyalty ===
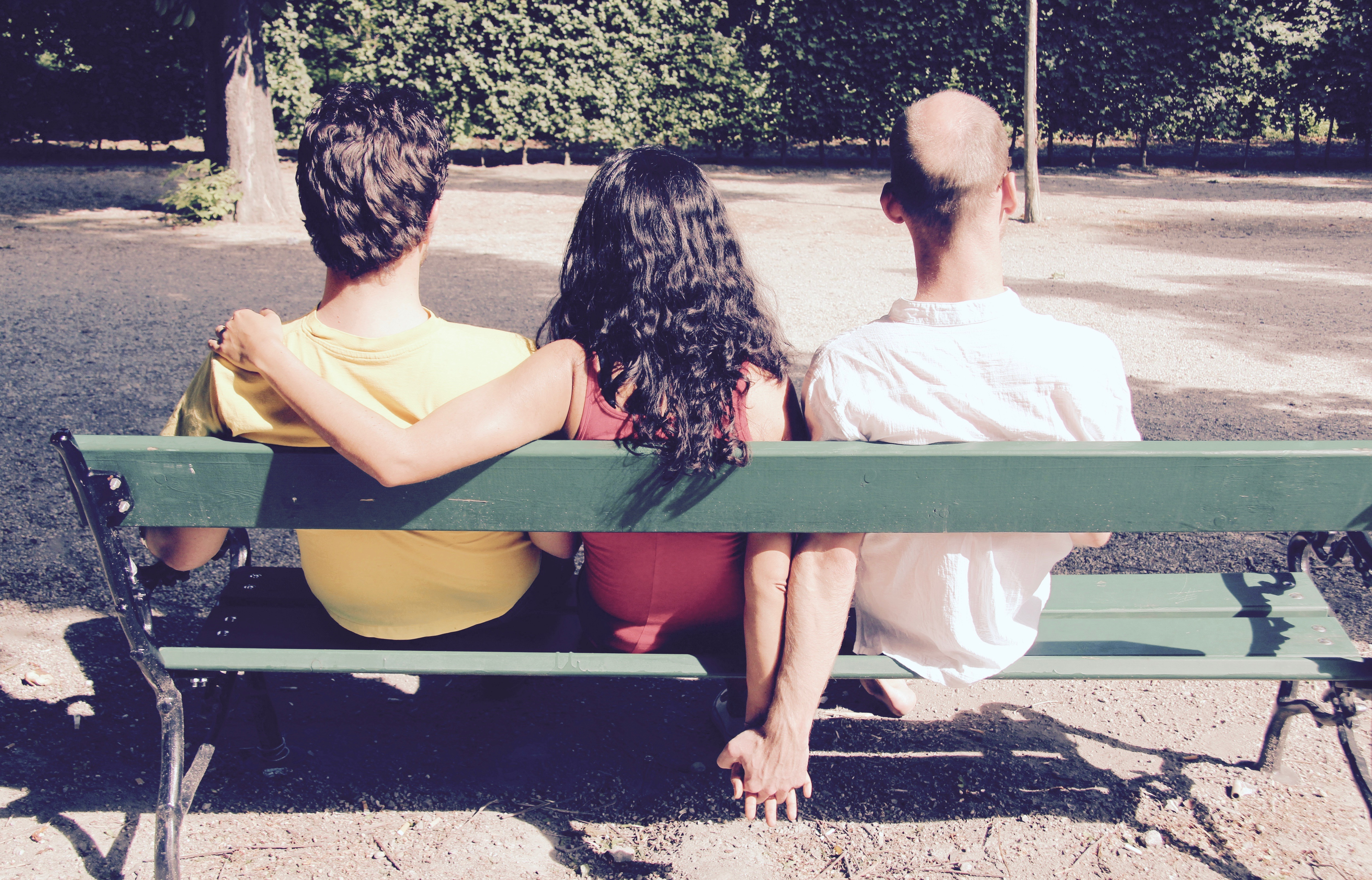
Three people in a polyamorous relationship.

A large percentage of polyamorists define fidelity not as sexual exclusivity, but as faithfulness to the promises and agreements made about a relationship. As a relational practice, polyamory sustains a vast variety of open relationship or multi-partner constellations, which can differ in definition and grades of intensity, closeness and commitment. Specifically, polyamory can take the forms of a triad (Note: The term "triad" for this type of arrangement was coined by Isaac Asimov in his 1972 novel The Gods Themselves.) of three people in an intimate relationship, a "vee" with one person as the pivot point of a relationship, and various other intimate networks. There are also those who are swingers and engage in polyamory or engage in poly-dating. A poly family is sometimes called kitchen table polyamory, a style in which all members of a particular polycule are comfortable and connected enough with each other that it is not uncommon for them to literally gather around the kitchen table, as they may spend holidays, birthdays, or other important times together as a large group. This emphasizes family-style connections, and not all members are necessarily sexually or romantically involved with every other person in the group.

Other styles of polyamory include parallel polyamory, where members of individual relationships prefer not to meet or know details of their partners' other relationships, solo polyamory defines non-monogamous individuals who do not want a primary partner and may resist the "relationship escalator" (the progression from dating to being exclusive to engagement to marriage to having children). For some, polyamory functions as an umbrella term for the multiple approaches of 'responsible non-monogamy'. A secret sexual relationship that violates those accords would be seen as a breach of fidelity. Polyamorists generally base definitions of commitment on considerations other than sexual exclusivity, e.g., "trust and honesty" or "growing old together". In an article in Men's Health, Zachary Zane states that commitment in a polyamorous relationship means that "you will be there for that person", supporting them, taking care of them, and loving them.

=== Communication and negotiation ===
Because there is no "standard model" for polyamorous relationships, and reliance upon common expectations may not be realistic, poly people advocate explicitly negotiating with all involved to establish relationship terms and often emphasizing that this should be an ongoing process of honest communication and respect. Communication is vital to repair a relationship when partners do not live up to these ideals. Some view polyamory, or their desire to practice it, as a response to challenges of monogamy.

=== Dignity and accord ===
Respect, trust, and honesty for all partners involved is a common tenet. Ideally, a partner's partners are accepted as part of that person's life rather than merely tolerated, and usually a relationship that involves deception or a "don't-ask-don't-tell" policy is seen as a less than ideal model.

=== Non-possessiveness ===
Some polyamorists view excessive restrictions on other deep relationships as less than desirable, as such restrictions can be used to replace trust with a framework of ownership and control. It is usually preferred or encouraged to view their partners' other significant others, often referred to as metamours or OSOs, in terms of the gain to their partners' lives rather than a threat to their own. Therefore, jealousy and possessiveness are generally viewed not so much as something to avoid or structure the relationships around but as responses that should be explored, understood, and resolved within each individual, with compersion as a goal. This is related to one of the types of polyamory, which is non-hierarchical, where "no one relationship is prioritized above the rest" and the fact that polyamorists insist on working through problems in their relationships "through open communication, patience, and honesty."

=== Compersion ===
Compersion is a term coined by members of the polyamorous community to describe an empathetic state of happiness and joy experienced when another individual experiences happiness and joy. In the context of polyamorous relationships, it describes positive feelings experienced by an individual when their intimate partner is enjoying another relationship. It has been variously described as "the opposite or flip side of jealousy", analogous to the "joy parents feel when their children get married", and a "positive emotional reaction to a lover's other relationship". The term has been compared to the four immeasurables and their near enemies in Buddhism. It is traced to the Kerista Commune in San Francisco.

=== Metamours ===
Metamour, sometimes spelled metamor, is a general term used to refer to an individual who is the lover of one’s lover, or partner of one’s partner, whom one is not directly romantically involved with. Examples could include the girlfriend of one’s husband, or the boyfriend of one’s boyfriend. It is a term that is commonly used within polyamorous communities.

==== Metamour dynamics ====
The dynamic of metamours varies widely. Some metamours are close friends, some are casual acquaintances, and some never meet. Some metamours make it a point to gift things to each other. Advice columns say there is no single way to have a relationship with a metamour and it is up to the individuals involved.

In their study of non-monogamous relationships among prominent Western intellectual figures, Brian Watson and Sarah Stein Lubrano found multiple examples of how metamours "found roles that allowed them to aid one another, exchange expertise and create mutually beneficial complimentary roles, and provide care to one another, often over a lifetime." Their examples include the long-term connections of Marianne Weber and Else von Richthofen (wife and later widow, and lover of Max Weber), and Erwin Schrödinger and both Peter Weyl (Schrödinger wife's lover) and Arthur March (whose wife Hilde was Schrödinger's lover). Marianne Weber and Richtofen stayed close for the three decades that followed Max's death.

The term is usually used to refer to a pair of people who are not romantically involved, but people can still be considered metamours if they have hooked up with each other.

=== Difficulties ===
Morin (1999) and Fleckenstein (2014) noted that certain conditions are favorable to good experiences with polyamory but that these differ from the general population. Heavy public promotion of polyamory can have the unintended effect of attracting people to it for whom it is not well-suited. Unequal power dynamics, such as financial dependence, can also inappropriately influence a person to agree to a polyamorous relationship against their true desires. Even in more equal power-dynamic relationships, the reluctant partner may feel coerced into a proposed non-monogamous arrangement due to the implication that if they refuse, the proposer will pursue other partners anyway, will break off the relationship, or that the one refusing will be accused of intolerance and not being open-minded.

Polyamorous relationships present practical pitfalls. One common complaint from participants is time management, as more partners mean one must divide one's time and attention between them, leaving less for each. Related is that the complexity of the arrangement can lead to so much effort being spent on the relationship that personal, individual needs can be overlooked. The strong emphasis on communication can unintentionally marginalize partners who are less articulate. Finally, negotiating the sometimes complex rules and boundaries of these relationships can be emotionally taxing, as can reconciling situations where one partner goes outside those boundaries.

The scientific studies of psychological well-being and relationship satisfaction for participants in polyamory have been limited due to mostly being a "hidden population." While some results could be interpreted as positive, these findings often suffer from bias and methodological issues. A significant number of studies rely on small samples, often recruited from referrals, snowball-sampling, and websites devoted to polyamory. Individuals recruited in this manner tend to be relatively homogeneous regarding values, beliefs, and demographics, which limits the generalizability of the findings. These samples also tend to be self-selecting toward individuals with positive experiences. In contrast, those who found polyamory to be distressing or hurtful might be more reluctant to participate in the research. Most of the studies rely entirely on self-report measures. Generally, self-reports of the degree of well-being and relationship satisfaction over time are flawed and are often based on belief rather than actual experience. Self-report measures are also at risk of self-enhancement bias, as subjects may feel pressure to give positive responses about their well-being and relationship satisfaction in the face of stereotype threat.

Almost anything that can go wrong in a monamorous relationship can go wrong in a polyamorous relationship as well, and more partners means more opportunities for these things to go wrong. In comparison to monamory, some issues are more common and some are less. Some are more readily resolved and others become thornier. Kathy Labriola wrote about the specific ways poly relationships are affected by conflict in The Polyamory Breakup Book (2019). Strengths that poly people have in navigating conflict include having more people to discuss the issue with, having likely selected partners who are open to communication, knowing a relationship ending might not leave them single, and probably having met friends who are also poly. Pitfalls include having unwanted opinions chiming in, worries partners could conspire against them, a sour mood from one partner causing trouble with another, a feeling that a breakup can't be effectively mourned, and feeling like the odd one out.

== Legal perspectives ==
=== Parenting ===
==== Canada ====
In June 2018, a court in Newfoundland and Labrador recognized three unmarried adults as legal parents of a child who was born within the polyamorous family they had formed; this was believed to be a first for Canadian law. The three adults included the child's mother and two men; the child's biological father was unknown.

In April 2021, a British Columbia Supreme Court justice declared a woman was the third legal parent in a polyamorous "triad".

In April 2025, the Superior Court of Quebec ruled that the province must recognize families with more than two parents. The court gave the provincial government one year to amend the Civil Code, and listed court rulings in five provinces and territories as precedent.

==== United States ====
In 1998, a Tennessee court granted guardianship of a child to her grandmother and step-grandfather, after the child's mother April Divilbiss and partners outed themselves as polyamorous on MTV. After contesting the decision for two years, Divilbiss eventually agreed to relinquish her daughter, acknowledging that she was unable to adequately care for her child and that this, rather than her polyamory, had been the grandparents' real motivation in seeking custody.

In 2013, California passed SB 274 (Family Code §7612(c)), legalizing state courts' recognition of more than two parents if the court finds that recognizing only two parents would be detrimental to the child. In 2017, three men became the first family in the state of California to have names of three fathers on their child's birth certificate under the law.

In November 2020, the issue of polyamory came to the Supreme Court of Vermont in the form of a custody dispute between two men and a woman in a polyamorous relationship, ultimately ruling against shared custody under the circumstances.

=== Domestic partnerships ===
In 2016, writer Rebecca Ruth Gould called for non-monogamy, including polyamory, to receive "the legal recognition it deserves", saying that polyamory remains a "negative identity".

In June 2020, the city council of Somerville, Massachusetts, voted to recognize polyamorous domestic partnerships in the city, becoming the first American city to do so. This measure was passed so that those in a polyamorous relationship would have access to their partners' health insurance amid the COVID-19 pandemic.

In March 2021, the Cambridge, Massachusetts City Council approved an ordinance amending the city's laws, stipulating that "a domestic partnership needn't only include two partners." The measure was supported by the Polyamory Legal Advocacy Coalition, also known as PLAC, composed of the Chosen Family Law Center, Harvard Law School LGBTQ+ Advocacy Clinic, and some members on the American Psychological Association's Committee on Consensual Non-Monogamy. This ordinance was originally proposed in July 2020. In April 2021, the adjacent town of Arlington, Massachusetts, approved domestic partnerships of more than two people through a motion at Town Meeting. Any motion approved at Arlington's Town Meeting is subject to review and approval from the state Attorney General's office; by early January 2022 that office (the office of Maura Healey) approved it.

In 2026, West Hollywood created a domestic partnership registry recognizing polyamorous relationships.

=== Anti-discrimination law ===
People in polyamorous relationships sometimes receive punishment at work when they are open about their relationships.

In 2010, Ann Tweedy, a legal scholar, argued that polyamory could be considered a sexual orientation under existing United States law. This argument was opposed by Christian Keese, who wrote in 2016 that advocating a "sexual orientation model of polyamory is likely to reduce the complexity and transformative potential of poly intimacies," while also limiting the reach and scope of possible litigation, obstructing the ability of poly activists to form alliances with other groups, and increasing the possibility that poly activists will have to settle for legal solutions which are "exclusive and reproductive of a culture of privilege".

Over the years, cities in the United States have passed ordinances banning discrimination against polyamorous people, with these ordinances prohibiting discrimination in employment, policing, businesses, city services, civil services, housing, or other aspects of life. This began with Somerville, Massachusetts in March 2023, and followed by the Oakland City Council in April 2024, Berkeley, California in May 2024, and three jurisdictions in March 2026: Olympia, Washington, Portland, Oregon, and West Hollywood, California. In September 2026, Seattle, Washington passed a bill that extended protection to both non-monogamous people and multigenerational households.

=== Marriage implications ===
Most western countries do not recognize polygamous marriages, and consider bigamy a crime. Several countries also prohibit people from living a polygamous lifestyle. This is the case in some states of the United States where the criminalization of a polygamous lifestyle originated as anti-Mormon laws, although they are rarely enforced. Having multiple non-marital partners, even if married to one, is legal in most U.S. jurisdictions; at most it constitutes grounds for divorce if the spouse is non-consenting, or feels that the interest in a further partner has destabilized the marriage. In some jurisdictions, such as North Carolina, a spouse can sue a third party for causing "loss of affection" in or "criminal conversation" (adultery) with their spouse, while more than twenty states in the US have laws against adultery, although they are infrequently enforced; the Supreme Court's ruling in Lawrence v. Texas did not explicitly hold such laws to be unconstitutional but its reasoning may imply that conclusion.

Polyamory, however, is on a continuum of family-bonds that includes group marriage and it does not refer to bigamy as long as no claim to being married in formal legal terms is made. The Social History of the American Family: An Encyclopedia (2014, edited by Marilyn J. Coleman and Lawrence H. Ganong) stated that under existing U.S. federal law, a polyamorous relationship is legal in all 50 states while polygamy is not. On November 23, 2011, the Supreme Court of British Columbia ruled that the anti-polygamy law of Canada does not affect unformalized polyamorous households; this is why Polyamory Day is celebrated every year on November 23. Even so, those in polyamorous relationships often face legal challenges when it comes to custody, morality clauses, adultery and bigamy laws, housing, and where they live.

In 2012, legal scholar Deborah Anapol called for the revision of existing U.S. laws against bigamy to permit married persons to enter into additional marriages, provided that they have first given legal notice to their existing marital partner or partners, with a "dyadic networks" model. In 2015, another legal scholar, Ronald C. Den Otter, wrote in the Emory Law Journal (in the article "Three May Not Be a Crowd: The Case for a Constitutional Right to Plural Marriage") that in the United States the constitutional rights of due process and equal protection fully support marriage rights for polyamorous families.

During a PinkNews question-and-answer session in May 2015, Redfern Jon Barrett questioned Natalie Bennett, leader of the Green Party of England and Wales, about her party's stance toward polyamorous marriage rights. Bennett responded by saying that her party is "open" to discussion on the idea of civil partnership or marriages between three people. Bennett's announcement aroused media controversy on the topic and led to major international news outlets covering her answer. A follow-up article written by Barrett was published by PinkNews on May 4, 2015, further exploring the topic.

In most countries, it is legal for three or more people to form and share a sexual relationship (subject sometimes to laws against homosexuality or adultery if two of the three are married). With only minor exceptions no developed countries permit marriage among more than two people, nor do the majority of countries give legal protection (e.g., of rights relating to children) to non-married partners. Individuals involved in polyamorous relationships are generally considered by the law to be no different from people who live together, or "date", under other circumstances.

In 2017, John Alejandro Rodriguez and Manuel Jose Bermudez, who were the first legally recognized gay marriage in Columbia, joined with Victor Hugo Prada to become Colombia's and the world's first legally recognized polyamorous relationship. Though not a strictly a marriage, as by Colombian law a marriage is defined between one man and one woman, a local notary and the throuple's lawyers were able to form a "special patrimonial union" between them. Some have called for domestic partnership laws to be expanded to include polyamorous couples and have said that marriage-like entitlements should apply to such couples.

== Prevalence ==
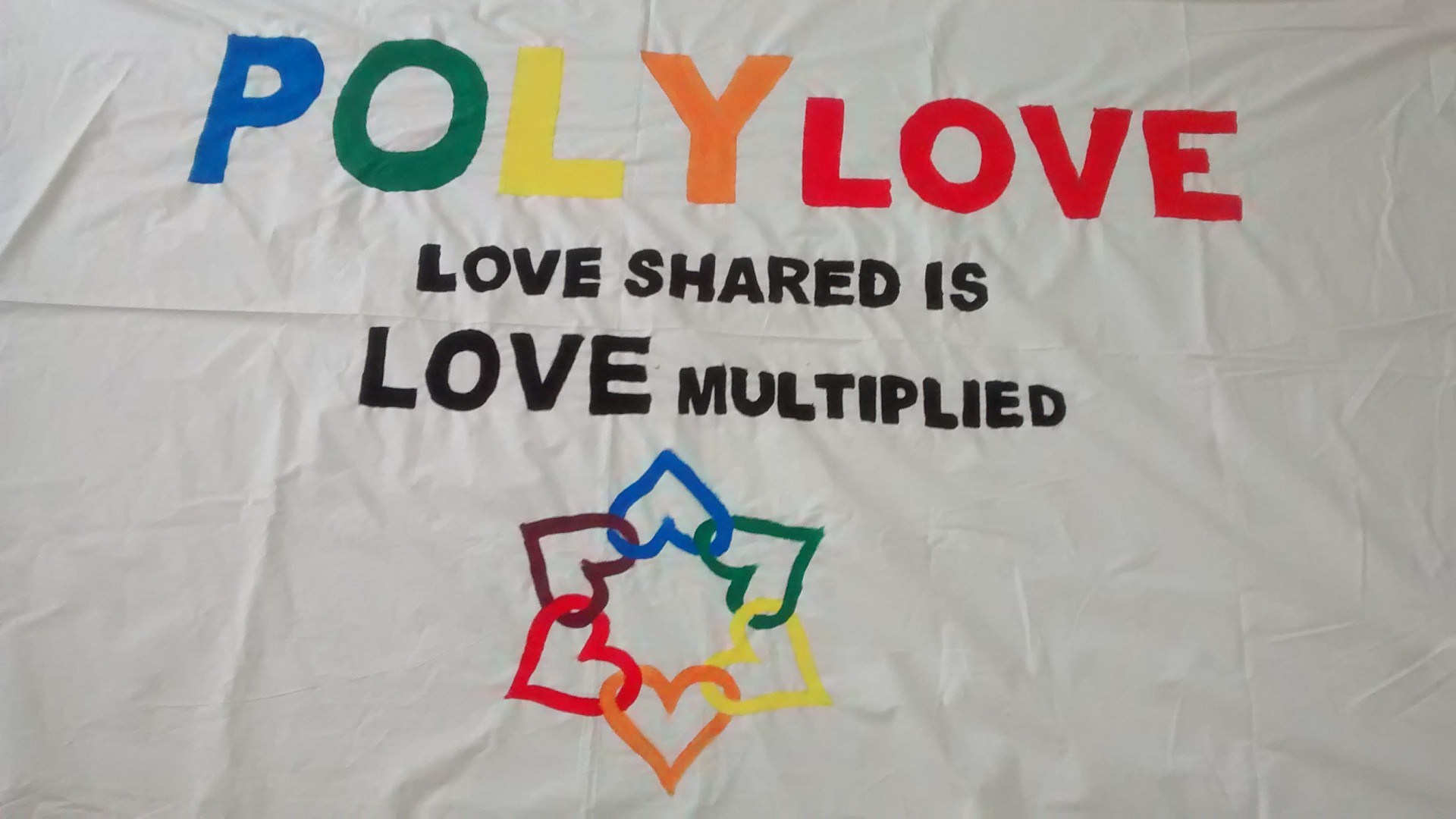
Preparations for Polyamory Pride at CSD Parade in Graz, Austria, in June 2017

Research into the prevalence of polyamory has been limited. A comprehensive government study of sexual attitudes, behaviors, and relationships in Finland in 1992 (age 18–75, around 50% female and male) found that around 200 out of 2250 (8.9%) respondents "agreed or strongly agreed" with the statement "I could maintain several sexual relationships at the same time" and 8.2% indicated a relationship type "that best suits" at the present stage of life would involve multiple partners. By contrast, when asked about other relationships simultaneously as a steady relationship, around 17% stated they had had other partners while in a steady relationship (50% no, 17% yes, 33% refused to answer).

The article What Psychology Professionals Should Know About Polyamory (by Geri Weitzman), based on a paper presented at the 8th Annual Diversity Conference in March 1999 in Albany, New York, states that while openly polyamorous relationships are relatively rare, there are "indications that private polyamorous arrangements within relationships are actually quite common." They also note, citing 1983 study of 3,574 married couples in their sample that "15–28% had an understanding that allows nonmonogamy under some circumstances," with percentages are higher among "cohabitating couples (28%), lesbian couples (29%) and gay male couples (65%)." According to Jessica Fern, a psychologist and the author of Polysecure: Attachment, Trauma and Consensual Nonmonogamy, as of September 2020, about 4% of Americans, nearly 16 million people, are "practising a non-monogamous style of relationship". A study by Amy C. Moors, Amanda N. Gesselman and Justin R. Garcia published on 23 March 2021 and using a sample of 3,438 individuals has shown that 10.7% of the sample were engaged in a polyamorous relationship at some point in their life, and 16.8% reported a desire to try or be in one. The study also revealed a correlation between educational background and polyamory, showing that lesser-educated male individuals were more likely to engage in or have been involved in polyamorous relationships. These findings indicate that the number of Americans who have engaged in polyamorous relationships is significantly higher than previously thought.

== Religious views on polyamory ==
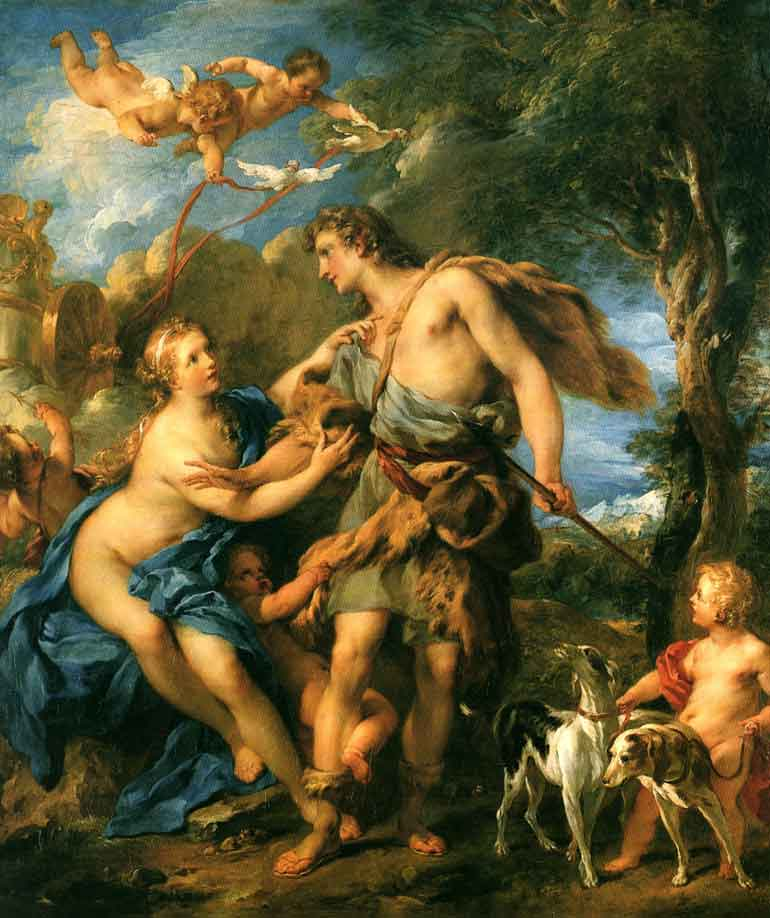
In Greek mythology, Adonis (center) was in a relationship with both Persephone and Aphrodite (left), who agreed to share his love. In some versions he was also in relationships with Dionysus, Apollo and Heracles.

It is difficult to compare modern polyamory to historic religions and cultures, given that the nature of relationships and consent have evolved over time. Some ancient religions allowed polygamous marriage for example, but would not meet the consent definition associated with the modern practice. Some polyamorous narratives are present in Greek mythology, most notably in the story of Adonis.

=== Christianity ===
Some Christians are polyamorous, although mainstream Christianity does not accept polyamory. The Oneida Community in the 1800s in New York (a Christian religious commune) believed strongly in a system of free love known as a complex marriage, where any member was free to have sex with any other who consented. In 1993, the archives of the community were made available to scholars for the first time. Contained within the archives was the journal of Tirzah Miller, Noyes' niece, who wrote extensively about her romantic and sexual relations with other members of Oneida.

In 2017, the Council on Biblical Manhood and Womanhood, an evangelical Christian organization, released a manifesto on human sexuality known as the "Nashville Statement". The statement was signed by 150 evangelical leaders and included 14 points of belief. Among other things, it states, "We deny that God has designed marriage to be a homosexual, polygamous, or polyamorous relationship."

=== Islam ===
Both Sunni and Shia Islam are accepting of polygyny, allowing men to have multiple wives. However, a woman may not have multiple husbands. The Qu'ran passage associated with this topic states:

If you fear that you shall not be able to deal justly with the orphans, Marry women of your choice, Two or three or four; but if you fear that you shall not be able to deal justly (with them), then only one, or (a captive) that your right hands possess, that will be more suitable, to prevent you from doing injustice. (Q.4:3)

The passage may have originally referred to providing care for women and orphans left without a husband or father during war. Polygyny is not widely practiced in modern Islam.

=== Hinduism ===
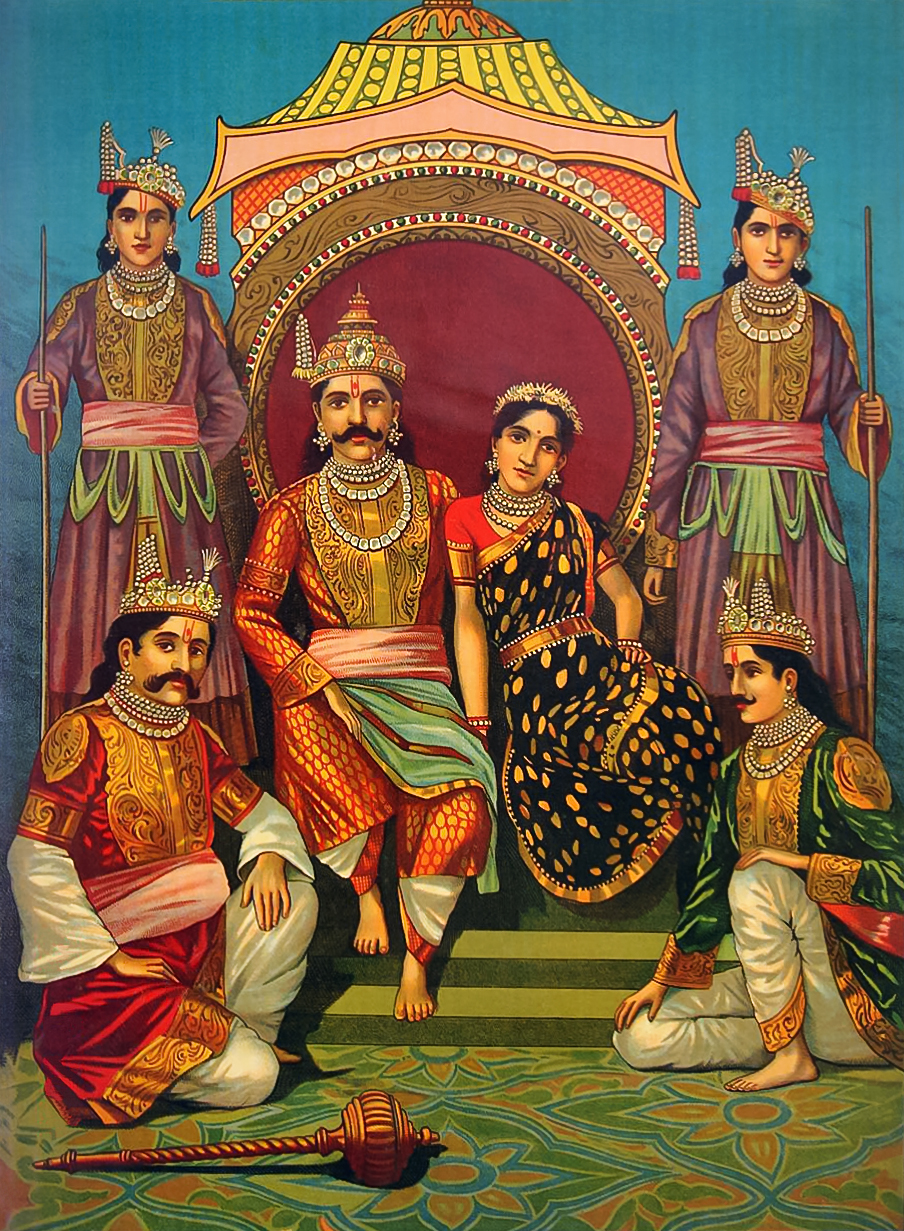
Draupadi and her five husbands

For thousands of years Hinduism has supported alternate conjugal forms, allowing both polygyny (one man with multiple wives) and polyandry (one woman with multiple husbands). There are several cases of polyandry in Hindu epics such as the Mahabharata. The manner of their presentation suggests tolerance for non-monogamy in ancient Hinduism. However, these alternate structures largely fell out of use in the twentieth century and today most Hindus are monogamous. In India, polygynous marriage was banned for Hindus in 1955.

Sambandam was a tradition in Kerala that allowed polyandry. The tradition has been compared to some modern European approaches to marriage, in that it offered women freedom of divorce, which was not usually available at the time. Sambandam was suppressed by British colonial authorities in the late 19th and early 20th centuries, for whom it was incompatible with a Christian worldview.

=== Buddhism ===
Buddhism is largely neutral on the subject of non-monogamy, given that it views marriage as a secular affair and not a matter of faith. There are some historical examples of Buddhist groups that practiced non-monogamy, including communities in Tibet. A 2024 study in the Asian Journal of Philosophy set out to examine the concept of compersion within a Buddhist philosophical framework.

=== Judaism ===
Traditional Judaism strictly prohibits multiple partners, both for men and women. Some Jews are polyamorous, although mainstream Judaism does not accept polyamory. Nikki DeBlosi is an openly polyamorous rabbi; she was ordained by the Reform Hebrew Union College – Jewish Institute of Religion. Also, in 2000, Rabbi Jacob Levin came out as polyamorous to his synagogue's board in California without losing his job as rabbi. As well, in his book A Guide to Jewish Practice: Volume 1 – Everyday Living (2011), Rabbi David Teutsch wrote, "It is not obvious that monogamy is automatically a morally higher form of relationship than polygamy," and that if practiced with honesty, flexibility, egalitarian rules, and trust, practitioners may "live enriched lives as a result". In 2013, Sharon Kleinbaum, the senior rabbi at Congregation Beit Simchat Torah in New York, said that polyamory is a choice that does not preclude a Jewishly observant and socially conscious life. Some polyamorous Jews point to biblical patriarchs having multiple wives and concubines as evidence that polyamorous relationships can be sacred in Judaism. An email list is dedicated to polyamorous Jews; it is called AhavaRaba, which roughly translates to "big love" in Hebrew, and which echoes God's "great" or "abounding" love mentioned in the Ahava rabbah prayer.

=== Satanism ===
LaVeyan Satanism is critical of Abrahamic sexual mores, considering them narrow, restrictive, and hypocritical. Satanists are pluralists, accepting polyamorists, bisexuals, lesbians, gays, BDSM, transgender people, and asexuals. Sex is viewed as an indulgence, but one that should only be freely entered into with consent. The Eleven Satanic Rules of the Earth only give two instructions regarding sex: "Do not make sexual advances unless you are given the mating signal" and "Do not harm little children", though the latter is much broader and encompasses physical and other abuse. This has been a consistent part of CoS policy since its inception in 1966. Magister Peter H. Gillmore wrote in an essay supporting same-sex marriage that some people try to suggest that their attitude on sexuality is "anything goes" even though they have a principle of "responsibility to the responsible".

=== Unitarian Universalism ===
Unitarian Universalists for Polyamory Awareness, founded in 2001, has engaged in ongoing education and advocacy for greater understanding and acceptance of polyamory within the Unitarian Universalist Association. At the 2014 General Assembly, two UUPA members moved to include the category of "family and relationship structures" in the UUA's nondiscrimination rule, along with other amendments; the GA delegates ratified the package of proposed amendments.

== Acceptance by non-religious organizations ==
In 2018, the Association of Humanistic Rabbis issued "A Statement on Sexual Ethics for the 21st Century", which states in part, "We commit to the freedom and empowerment of all adults to full consensual sexual expression, be it monogamous or polyamorous."

== In a clinical setting ==
In 2002, a paper titled Working with polyamorous clients in the clinical setting (by Joy Davidson) addressed various areas of inquiry. This included the importance of talking about alternatives to monogamy, how therapists can work with those who are exploring polyamory, basic understandings of polyamory, and key issues that therapists need to watch for in the course of working with polyamorous clients. It concluded that "Sweeping changes are occurring in the sexual and relational landscape" (including "dissatisfaction with limitations of serial monogamy, i.e. exchanging one partner for another in the hope of a better outcome"); that clinicians need to start by "recognizing the array of possibilities that 'polyamory' encompasses" and "examine our culturally-based assumption that 'only monogamy is acceptable'" and how this bias impacts on the practice of therapy; the need for self-education about polyamory, basic understandings about the "rewards of the poly lifestyle" and the common social and relationship challenges faced by those involved, and the "shadow side" of polyamory, the potential existing for coercion, strong emotions in opposition, and jealousy. The paper also states that the configurations a therapist would be "most likely to see in practice" are individuals involved in primary-plus arrangements, monogamous couples wishing to explore non-monogamy for the first time, and "poly singles".

In 2002, the rights of polyamorous people were added to the mission of the National Coalition for Sexual Freedom, an American sex-positive advocacy and educational organization; a manual for psychotherapists who deal with polyamorous clients was published by them in September 2009, called What Psychotherapists Should Know About Polyamory (written by Geri Weitzman and others).

The National Coalition for Sexual Freedom manages the Kink And Poly Aware Professionals Directory, which consists of an Internet directory of psychotherapeutic, medical, and other professionals who have volunteered to be contacted by people who are involved in polyamory (and/or BDSM, etc.).

The Polyamory-Friendly Professionals Directory is a directory on the Internet "of professionals who are sensitive to the unique needs of polyamorous clientele"; it includes psychologists, therapists, medical professionals, and other professionals.

== Media representation ==
=== 1970s to 2000s ===
The Gods Themselves is a 1972 novel by Isaac Asimov, a third of which is devoted to describing an alien race in an alien dimension where romantic relationships are usually composed of three individuals and where conception, and orgasm, is only possible during sexual intercourse between all three partners at the same time (i.e., a threesome).

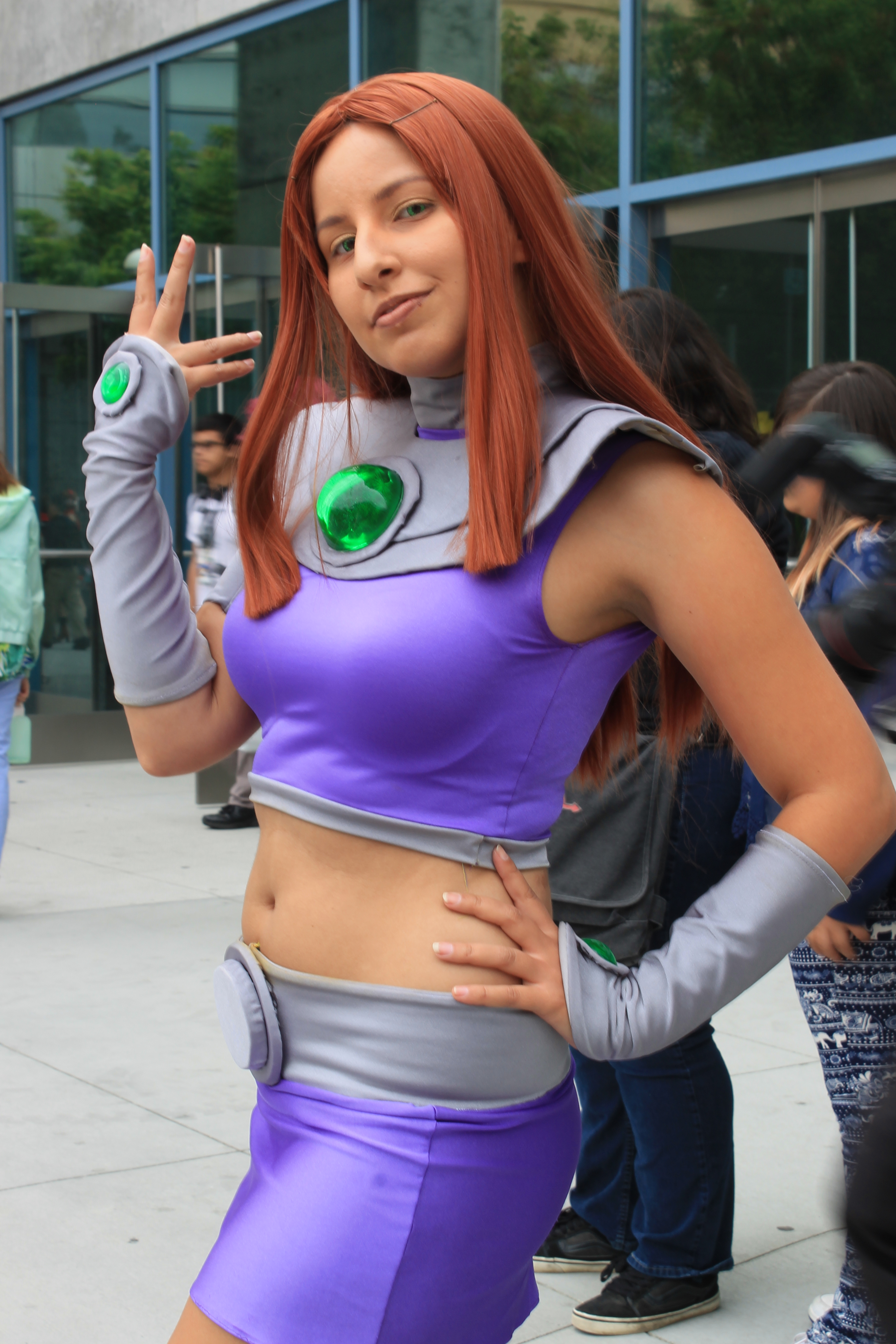
Cosplay of the superhero Starfire at FanimeCon 2015

Starfire, a superhero who debuted in a preview story inserted within DC Comics Presents #26 (October 1980), was shown to be a polyamorous character. Starfire was raised on the world of Tamaran where it was acceptable to have an open marriage. Some critics argue that after arriving on Earth, she remained sex-positive and free-thinking, remaining open to polygamous relationships, open sex, and pansexual "free-love" with anyone, often leading to conflict with Earth's more reserved culture and customs.

In 1989, the anime series Ranma ½ included a polyamorous character, Tatewaki, who is in love with both Akane and the "Pigtail Girl" (Ranma's female form) and proposes to date both, but they do not return his feelings.

Robert Jordan's fantasy book series The Wheel of Time, which began its run in 1990, is notable for its inclusion of various polyamorous relationships throughout the narrative. This includes the protagonist Rand al’Thor, who enters a romantic relationship with three women, Min, Aviendha and Elayne. The Aiel culture in the series also practice polyamory commonly. Jordan himself acknowledged that he had been in a non-monogamous relationship as a younger man, which inspired the relationships seen in his works. The books also hinted at a relationship between Alanna and her (male) warders Ihvon and Maksim, but it was not explored in detail until the 2021 television adaptation.

In 2002, the Futurama episode "A Taste of Freedom" showed Old Man Waterfall, who is Zoidberg's defense attorney until killed by a giant crab warship, having seven wives and one husband. While Waterfall's case for Zoidberg is unsuccessful, the Supreme Court holds polygamy as legal, though this leads to jeers from spectators. The made-for-TV Futurama film, The Beast with a Billion Backs (published 2008), featured two polyamorous characters: Colleen O'Hallahan and Yivo. Colleen had five boyfriends, Fry, Chu, Ndulu, Schlomo and Bolt Rolands, (Note: Fry breaks up with Colleen and becomes the messenger of Yivo after he states that their relationship is not working out.) while Yivo is a planet-sized alien with no determinable gender, dating, then marrying all people of the universe at once. Fry and Colleen eventually break up. Afterwards, Yivo remains in a relationship with Colleen.

The 21st century brought various new forms of representation of polyamory. The topic, which had been rarely the subject of news reporting, rapidly gained in popularity, "increased by three orders of magnitude between 1994 and 2023." In 2007, Daniel Help Justice's book Dreyd featured Tarsa, a priestess, warrior, and bisexual woman, as part of a polyamorous love triad. In 2009, Graham Nicholls founded www.polyamory.org.uk, the United Kingdom's first website about polyamory and the Mom of Pina in Maria Pallotta-Chiarolli's novel, Love You Two was shown to be polyamorous and bisexual, leading Pina on a journey to explore the "complex spectrum of sex and love" in humanity itself. In 2010, the series Lost Girl began. It included Bo Dennis, a bisexual succubus which must sustain herself by feeding from the life force of male and female Fae and humans, via oral intake or the energy created through sex. In the first two seasons she was involved romantically with Dyson (a heterosexual shapeshifter) and Lauren (a lesbian human). Later on, Bo tried to have a monogamous relationship with Lauren, with Bo and Lauren remaining in love with each other through ups and downs, and later accepting each other as a couple by the end of the series.

=== Increased representation in the 2010s ===
Polyamorous characters appeared in various media in the 2010s. In the 2010 television show Caprica, several main characters are portrayed as being in a polyfidelitous-style marriage consisting of multiple men and women, with each member being equal socially and legally. From 2012 to 2013, the American reality television series on the American pay television network Showtime, Polyamory: Married & Dating, was broadcast. It followed polyamorous families as they navigated the challenges presented by polyamory. Around the same time, the webcomic Kimchi Cuddles began, which portrayed polyamorous people like other characters, "only with more partners to steal their blankets." The following years featured a polyamorous captain in Jacqueline Koyanagi's novel, Ascension, and three characters (Reese, David, and Amber) in a relationship in Malinda Lo's novel, Inheritance. In 2011, American Horror Story: Hotel began, with Countess Elizabeth Johnson, played by Lady Gaga, beginning a relationship with famed film actor Rudolph Valentino and his wife, Natacha Rambova, as seen in episode seven. The following year, the YouTube show The Gay and Wondrous Life of Caleb Gallo would show a couple working through their decision to convert from monogamy to polyamory, like Brian Jordan Alvarez, who considers himself polyamorous.

From 2015 to 2017, in the webcomic Always Human by Ari North, the parents of Sunati (Nisa and Prav) were shown to be in a polyamorous relationship with a man named Vish, who Nisa calls "our boyfriend". In another webcomic, Unknown Lands, which began in 2015, Vard is shown to be polyamorous, along with most of the cast having a queer sexual identity. The webcomic itself has environmental, feminist, and LGBTQ+ themes. A few years later, the 2017 film Professor Marston and the Wonder Women focuses on the real-life polyamorous relationship between the professor, psychologist William Moulton Marston (the creator of Wonder Woman), his wife and research partner Elizabeth Holloway Marston, and their student, Olive Byrne, as they share a "workplace, a bed, a home and eventually a family." Furthermore, fiction writer Cassandra Clare stated that Mark Blackthorn in The Dark Artifices book series would "definitely be open to a polyamorous relationship", but would not cheat or lie, while noting that another such relationship between other characters would not be possible. Eventually, he ends up in a polyamorous triangle, with a girlfriend and a boyfriend who are dating each other. Additionally, writer K. Ancrum confirmed that polyamorous characters were in two of her books (The Wicker King and The Weight of the Stars), but did not name any specific characters. At the same time, Em, best friend of the protagonist in two books by Leigh Matthews (Don't Bang the Barista and Go Deep) is a bisexual woman dating a man in the first book, but by the second book she has "happily settled into a poly triad", wondering how she will get married.

On May 29, 2017, in the last season of Steven Universe, Fluorite, a member of the Off Colors, a fusion of six different gems into one being, with fusion as the physical manifestation of a relationship, was introduced. This character reappeared in various episodes in the show's fifth season ("Lars Head", "Lars of the Stars", "Your Mother and Mine"), the season 5 finale, "Change Your Mind", along with one in Steven Universe Future ("Little Graduation") and in Steven Universe: The Movie, with the latter two as non-speaking appearances. The series creator, Rebecca Sugar, confirmed that Fluorite is a representation of a polyamorous relationship at the show's Comic Con panel in San Diego. Sugar said at the panel, and at another conference, that she was inspired after talking with children at an LGBTQ+ center in Long Beach, California, who wanted a polyamorous character in the show. Steven Universe was not alone in this regard. The fourth season of BoJack Horseman, a mature animated series, featured a character named Hollyhock, the sister of the protagonist, who has eight adoptive fathers (Note: Dashawn Manheim, Steve Mannheim, Jose Guerrero, Cupe Robinson III, Otto Zilberschlag, Arturo "Ice Man" Fonzerelli, Gregory Hsung, and Quackers McQuack) in a polyamorous gay relationship. The same year, Unicornland premiered, with eight-episode web series focusing on Annie's exploration into polyamory after her divorce.

=== 2018–present ===
Polyamory was the subject of the 2018 Louis Theroux documentary Love Without Limits, where Theroux travels to Portland, Oregon, to meet a number of people engaged in polyamorous relationships. Also in 2018, 195 Lewis, a web series about a black lesbian couple dealing with their relationship being newly polyamorous, received the Breakthrough Series – Short Form award from the Gotham Awards. The series premiered in 2017 and ran for five episodes. The same year, the comic Open Earth premiered. The comic is set in the future and monogamous relationships are seen as outdated to all the young people on board the space station, all of whom are polyamorous. Author Sarah Mirk said that she wanted to write a story where "open relationships can be really positive and wonderful" and said that it is realistic to believe that people would "explore multiple relationships".

Trigonometry is an eight-part BBC TV drama series which started on March 15, 2020, and is about an existing couple being joined by a third person and forming a polyamorous relationship. The BBC said that Trigonometry is "A love story about three people who are made for each other." In July 2021, Australian soap opera Neighbours explored polyamory with three of its main characters. Actress Jacinta Stapleton was proud to be involved in the story arc, stating: "I think we should always try to reflect real intimate relationships in our society. Polyamory certainly is a part of that. The more we represent the beautifully diverse nature and uniqueness of humans, the more people will feel accepted and seen."

In May 2020, ND Stevenson, showrunner of She-Ra and the Princesses of Power confirmed the relationship between Kyle and Rogelio, and added that in his mind, Lonnie is also part of it, implying a possible polyamorous throuple.

Couple to Throuple is an American reality television show that premiered in 2024 and involves romantic couples experimenting with polyamory.

Riverdale is an American television series based on the characters of Archie Comics. In August 2023, the finale aired, revealing that Archie, Betty, Veronica and Jughead were in a polycule during their senior year of high school.

== Polyamory-related observances ==
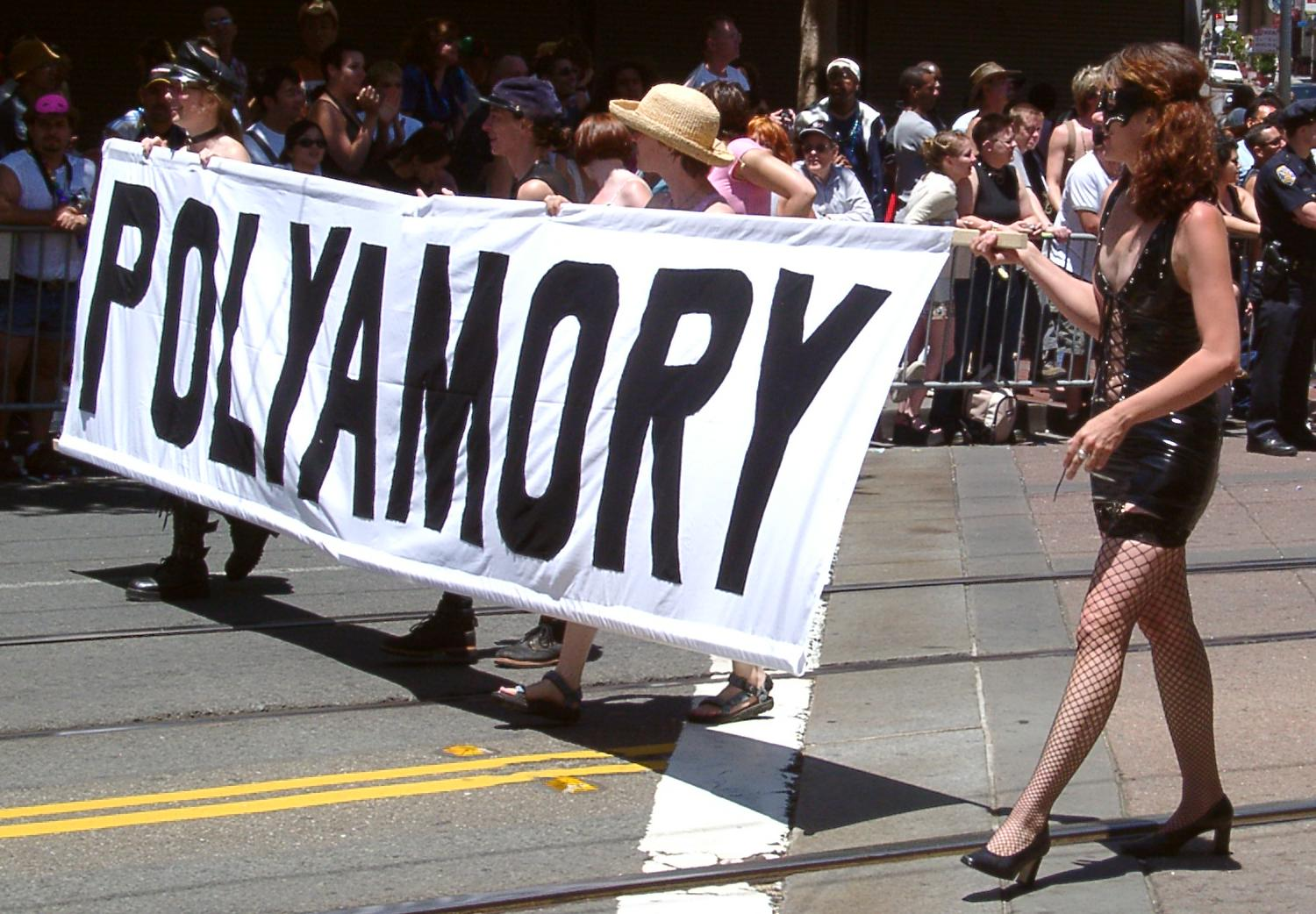
Start of polyamory contingent at San Francisco Pride 2004

There are various observances related to polyamory. For one, every year, on a day in Pride Month, Polyamory Pride Day is celebrated. In addition, polyamory groups sometimes participate in pride parades.

Later in the year, International Solo Polyamory Day and Polyamory Day are celebrated. International Solo Polyamory occurs every year on September 24, while Polyamory Day is celebrated every year on November 23. The day of the latter celebration was chosen because on November 23, 2011, the Supreme Court of British Columbia ruled that the anti-polygamy law of Canada does not affect unformalized polyamorous households.

Additionally, Metamour Day is celebrated every year on February 28. It celebrates the relationships people have with their metamours (partners' other significant others, often referred to as metamours or OSOs).

== Polyamory rights organizations ==
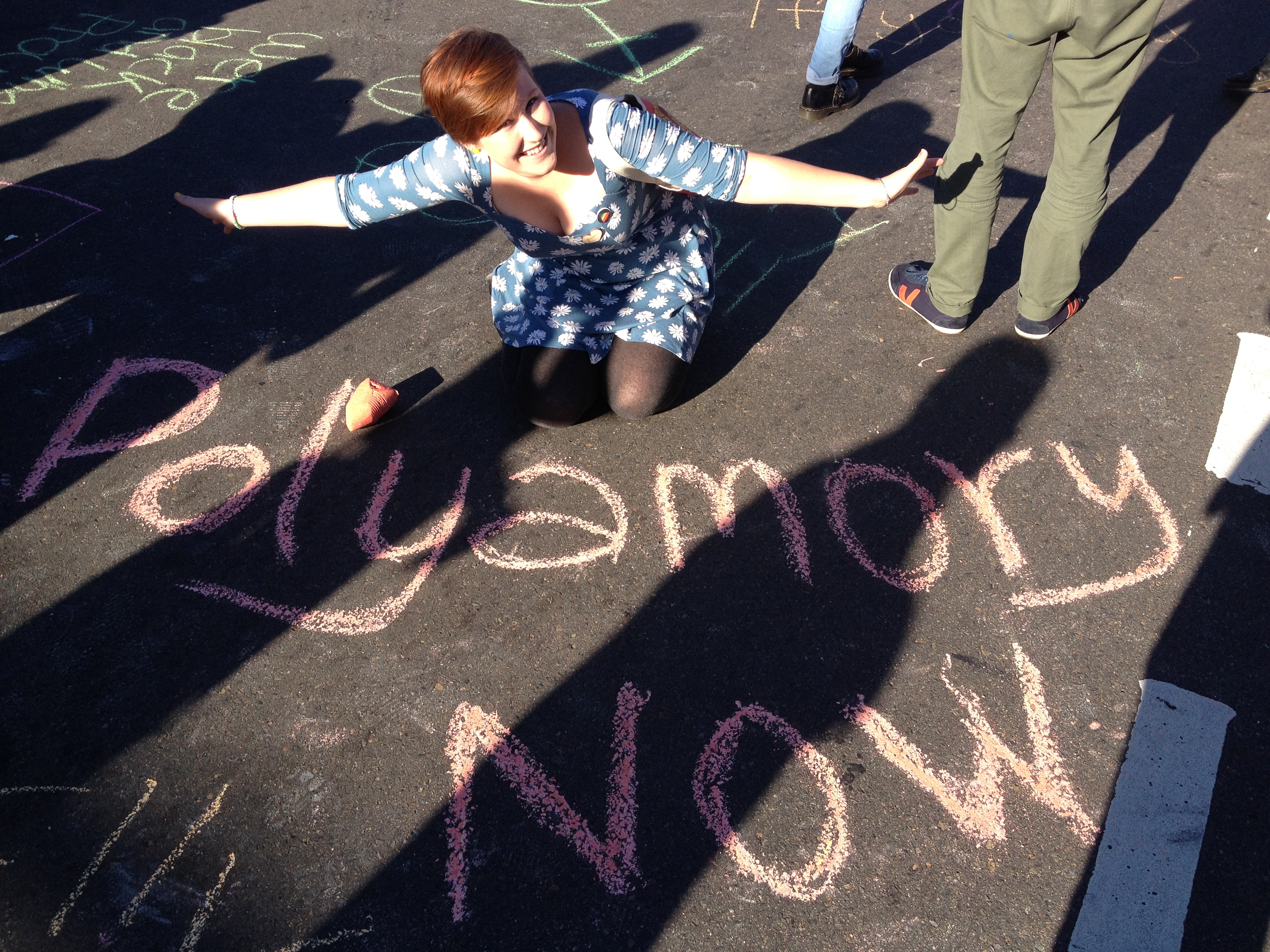
Bridgette Garozzo, spokesperson for the Polyamory Action Lobby, in May 2013

The Canadian Polyamory Advocacy Association (CPAA) was founded in 2009. It "advocates on behalf of Canadians who practice polyamory. It [also] promotes legal, social, government, and institutional acceptance and support of polyamory, and advances the interests of the Canadian polyamorous community generally."

Loving More was an American non-profit organization formed to support and advocate on behalf of polyamorous people. Founded in 1984, Loving More claimed to be the oldest and longest-running polyamory organization; Loving More became inactive in March 2024.

The Organization for Polyamory and Ethical Non-monogamy (OPEN) was founded in the United States in 2022 as "a nonprofit organization dedicated to normalizing and empowering non-monogamous individuals and communities."

The Polyamory Action Lobby (PAL) was founded in 2013 in Australia to fight cultural misconceptions about polyamorous people and to fight for their legal rights.

The Polyamory Legal Advocacy Coalition (PLAC), based in the United States, "seeks to advance the civil and human rights of polyamorous individuals, communities, and families through legislative advocacy, public policy, and public education."

The UK Polyamory Association (UKPA) was founded by Giulia Smith. Its mission statement is, “The UK Polyamory Association exists to support the needs of polyamorous people and communities across the UK. We aim to increase public awareness and acceptance of polyamory, and challenge stigma through advocacy, positive representation, and education.”

Unitarian Universalists for Polyamory Awareness (UUPA) was founded in 2001. It "has as its mission to serve the Unitarian Universalist Association and the community of polyamorous people within and outside the UUA by providing support, promoting education, and encouraging spiritual wholeness regarding polyamory."

== Opposition ==
Yasmin Nair, a co-founder of Against Equality, has criticized polyamory. She has stated that polyamorists are not inherently radical, and said that the discourse around polyamory is unengaging and not liberating, only fetishizing a "peculiar form of monogamy...and long-term relationships". In a 2013 article in The Guardian, Julie Bindel described polyamory as "co-opting and rebranding of polygamy". She argued that contemporary proponents of polyamory often overlooked gender dynamics and characterized it as a choice predominantly made by "overwhelmingly white, affluent, university-educated, and privileged folk". The conservative National Review claimed that "widespread acceptance of polyamory could make society worse off" with supposed false notions of honesty. Conor Friedersdorf, writing in The Atlantic in 2015, expressed his opposition to polyamorous civil marriages.

== Notable practitioners of polyamory ==
- Clint Eastwood, actor and director
- Jena Malone, actress
- Janelle Monáe, singer, songwriter, rapper and actress, has acknowledged having been in both polyamorous and monogamous relationships
- Dossie Easton, co-author of The Ethical Slut and other works
- Terisa Greenan, writer, actress, filmmaker, and creator of Family: the web series
- Laurell K. Hamilton, writer, known for Anita Blake: Vampire Hunter
- Janet Hardy, writer and sex educator, and founder of Greenery Press
- Magnus Hirschfeld, sexologist and LGBTQ advocate
- Brenda Howard, bisexual rights activist
- Jane Schoenbrun, filmmaker
- Willow Smith, musician

== Gallery ==
The earliest polyamory pride flag design, created by Jim Evans in 1995. The Greek letter Pi stands for the first letter in the word polyamory. Evans wanted a symbol that could be used without drawing wider attention.

A polyamory pride flag designed by Red Howell. The design was chosen in 2022, selected from four candidates via an online survey conducted by the blog PolyamProud with over 30,000 people participating.

The "infinity heart" is a widely used symbol of polyamory.

== See also ==
- Amatonormativity – Societal assumption about relationships
- Mononormativity – Social assumption of monogamous normativity
- Free love – Social movement that accepts all forms of love
- Group marriage – Three or more adults in a partnership
- Group sex – Sexual behavior involving more than two participants
- Ménage à trois – Romantic relationship with three partners
- Non-monogamy – Intimate relationship that is not strictly monogamous
- Open relationship – Interpersonal relationship to form of a non-monogamous relationship
- Polyamory in the United States
- Polyday – One-day convention/conference held in the UK, celebrating polyamory
- Polyfidelity – Form of polyamory
- Relationship anarchy – Belief that relationships should be unbound by rules except those with a mutual agreement
- Romantic orientation – Classification of a person's romantic attraction towards others
- Sociosexual orientation – Willingness for extra-relationship sexual activity
- Terminology within polyamory
