= Open relationship =

Interpersonal relationship to form of a non-monogamous relationship

An open relationship is an intimate relationship that is sexually or romantically non-monogamous. An open relationship generally indicates a relationship where there is a primary emotional and intimate relationship between partners, who agree to at least the possibility of sexual or emotional intimacy with other people. The term "open relationship" is sometimes used interchangeably with the term polyamory, but the two concepts are not identical.

Open relationships include any type of romantic relationship (dating, marriage, etc.) that is open. An "open" relationship means one or more parties have permission to be romantically or sexually involved with people outside of the relationship. This is opposed to the traditionally "closed" relationship, where both parties agree on being with one another exclusively. The concept of an open relationship has been recognized since the 1970s.

== Types ==
To a large degree, open relationships are a generalization of the concept of a relationship beyond monogamous relationships. A form of open relationship is the open marriage, in which the participants in a marriage have an open relationship.

There are several different styles of open relationships. Some examples include:

- Multi-partner relationships, between three or more partners where a sexual relationship does not occur between all of the parties involved.
- Hybrid relationships, when one partner is non-monogamous and the other is monogamous.
- Swinging, in which singles or partners in a committed relationship engage in sexual activities with others as a recreational or social activity.

The main unifying element to open relationship styles is non-exclusivity of romantic or sexual relationships. Another generic term for all these types of relationships is open love.

=== Swinging ===
Swinging is a form of open relationship in which the partners in a committed relationship engage in sexual activities with others at the same time. Swingers may regard the practice as a recreational or social activity that adds variety or excitement into their otherwise conventional sex lives or for curiosity. Swingers who engage in casual sex maintain that sex among swingers is often more frank and deliberative and therefore more honest than infidelity. Some couples see swinging as a healthy outlet and means to strengthen their relationship.

=== Open marriage ===
An open marriage, sometimes referred to as consensual non-monogamy or CNM, is a type of marriage wherein the involved parties unequivocally consent to their partners entering or engaging in romantic and/or sexual relationships with other people.

=== Polyamory ===
Polyamory is the practice, desire, or acceptance of having more than one intimate relationship at a time with the knowledge and consent of everyone involved. While "open relationship" is sometimes used as a synonym for "polyamory" or "polyamorous relationship", the terms are not synonymous; polyamorous people may choose between open relationships or polyfidelity. The "open" in "open relationship" refers to the sexual aspect of a relationship, whereas "polyamory" refers to allowing bonds to form (which may be sexual or otherwise) as additional long-term relationships.

The terms "polyamory" and "friends with benefits" are fairly recent, having come about within the past few decades though non-monogamy has existed since prehistoric times.

== Prevalence ==
Sociologists Elaine K. Hollander and Howard M. Vollmer observed open relationships occurring more frequently among certain demographics. According to their 1974 survey of American college students, youth, college-educated, middle-class, and people of certain ethnic and racial minorities have been observed to engage in open relationships more frequently than their counterparts. According to the 2012 National Survey of Sexual Health and Behavior, 4% of respondents reported being in an open relationship. It was also found that males and LGBT individuals are more likely to report being in an open relationship, with 33% of gay men, 23% of bisexual men, 5% of lesbian females, and 22% of bisexual females reporting an open relationship.

Hollander and Vollmer's 1974 study also showed that male students who either cohabit or live in a communal group are more likely to become involved in open relationships than females, and are still more interested in the concept than females even if not participating in open relationships. A survey taken by gay men's "health and life magazine", FS Magazine, of the 1,006 gay men they surveyed 41% are in, or have previously experienced, an open relationship. Of the men who are in an open relationship, 75% believe that open relationships are "great".

In a 1977 study performed by James W. Ramey, couples within open relationships were observed to be dual-career, meaning that both primary partners simultaneously hold stable employment. Ramey also found that couples in open relationships were more likely to hold managerial positions within their respective careers. Most were observed to be either childfree, or post child-rearing.

== Reward vs. risk ==
=== Reasons for entering an open relationship ===
An open relationship may form for various reasons. These include:

- liking another person but not wanting to end the old relationship
- pressure or coercion from the partner wishing for an open relationship
- being non-monogamous by nature (i.e. born that way)
- a difference emerging between two people in a relationship
- one partner realizing that they are unable to fulfill the other's needs
- varying sex drive between partners
- one or both partners desiring more freedom, companionship, intellectual variety, a variety of sexual partners, getting ahead career-wise or maintaining relationships
- a need for challenge: some people feel that their relationship is inadequate unless they are being challenged. Open relationships may create a sense of jealousy, attachment, or possessiveness, all of which are challenges for a relationship to work through. These emotions can also lead to greater self-awareness which may be seen as satisfying to those in open relationships. Some research has found that individuals in open relationships report less jealousy compared to those in monogamous relationships.
- the enjoyment of new relationship energy, the state of heightened emotional and sexual receptivity and excitement experienced during the formation of a new physical relationship
- being able to meet other couples and individuals with a similar outlook with whom the participants can connect with on an intellectual and emotional level
- being in a relationship of convenience, that is, one that is not primarily based on mutual feeling of love towards each other (anymore), but rather on economic or social factors (e.g.: the traditional practice of polyandry in rural Tibet)
- distance – when partners live in separate parts of the world for part or all of the time
- sex may be more pleasing, and the participants may engage in it more frequently than those in an average couple
- issues with sexual compatibility
- increased trust that comes with boundary setting and communication
- increased intimacy that comes with open discussion around sexual desires and experiences

"It has been proposed that men (both gay and straight), in contrast to women, are able to cognitively separate sex from emotions (or love) in a process commonly termed compartmentalization." This means it is not unusual for homosexual men to have open relationships, which means breaking the 'norm' of a committed and 'typical' heterosexual relationship. That is not to suggest that open relationships do not work; research has shown comparable relationship satisfaction for both monogamous and non-monogamous couples.

=== Reasons for avoiding an open relationship ===
Many couples consider open relationships, but choose not to follow through with the idea. If a person attempts to approach their committed monogamous partner about transitioning to an open relationship, the monogamous partner may convince or coerce them to either stay monogamous or pursue a new partner. There may also be concern that when beginning an open relationship, a partner may become only concerned in their personal development and pay less attention to their partner.

Jealousy is often present in monogamous relationships, and adding one or more partners to the relationship may cause it to increase. Results of some studies have suggested that jealousy remains a problem in open relationships because the actual involvement of a third party is seen as a trigger. In Constantine & Constantine (1971), the researchers found that 80% of participants in open marriages had experienced jealousy at one point or another.

Consensual non-monogamous relationships have negative stereotypes around them, including less sexually fulfilling, more sexually risky, and less moral. These stereotypes are reinforced by mononormativity, which is the belief that monogamous relationships are the most natural and culturally acceptable relationship.

Cultural pressure may also dissuade initiating or switching to an open relationship. There is a commonly held societal stereotype that those involved in open relationships are less committed or mature than those who are in monogamous relationships. Films, media, and self-help books present the message that to desire more than one partner means not having a "true" relationship. In the post-WWII 1950s-1970s, it was traditional to "date around" (with guidelines such as not going out with one particular suitor twice in a row) until ready to start "going steady" (the onset of exclusivity and sexual exploration); since then, non-exclusive dating around has lost favour and going directly to steady (now known simply as exclusive dating) has been elevated instead. Desiring an open relationship in these days often claimed to be a phase that a person is passing through before being ready to "settle down". The logistics of an open relationship may be difficult to cope with, especially if the partners reside together, split finances, own property, or parent children.

==== Sexually transmitted infection ====
Any sexual contact outside of a strictly monogamous or polyfidelitous relationship increases the possibility that one member of the group will contract a sexually transmitted infection and pass it into the group.

Neither barrier device use (such as condoms) nor more vigilant STI testing and vaccination can fully eliminate such risk, but can reduce the statistical increase attributable to nonmonogamy. Nevertheless, using data from the 2012 National Survey of Sexual Health and Behavior, Levine et al. (2018) found that individuals in open relationships reported more condom use in both vaginal and anal intercourse compared to monogamous couples.

The development of PrEP has led to a decrease in risk for HIV infection by as much as 92%. If both partners are on PrEP, risk of HIV infection is diminished, even if there are multiple partners.

== Successful open relationships ==
One of the most significant factors that aids a relationship in being successful is that it is about making the relationship fit the needs of all parties involved. No two open relationships will be the same, and the relationship will change due to the current circumstances at each specific moment. The style of the open relationship will mirror the parties' involved values, goals, desires, needs and philosophies.

The most successful relationships have been those that take longer to establish. By taking the time to develop a clear idea of what both partners want out of the openness of a relationship, it allows the parties involved to self-reflect, process their emotions, deal with possible conflicts, and (for those transitioning from monogamy to nonmonogamy) find ways to cope with the change.

Negotiating the details of the open relationship is important throughout the communication process. Topics that are commonly found in negotiations between couples include honesty, relationship maintenance, trust, boundaries, and time management.

Some proponents of open relationships argue that greater relational freedom often requires more, rather than fewer, agreements between partners. Communication, honesty, self-awareness, boundary-setting, and responsibility for one's own emotions are frequently cited as important skills for maintaining healthy consensually non-monogamous relationships.

Other tools that couples utilize in the negotiation process include allowing partners to veto new relationships, prior permission, and interaction between partners. This helps to reassure each partner in the relationship that their opinion is valued. Although ability to veto can be a useful tool in negotiation, a successful negotiation and open relationship can still occur without it. Some reject veto power because they believe it limits their partner from experiencing a new relationship and limits their freedom.

=== Boundaries ===
Types of boundaries include physical, which is along the lines of not touching someone without permission being given; sexual boundaries; and emotional boundaries, which is avoiding the discussion of specific emotions. Boundaries help to set out rules for what is and is not acceptable to the members of the relationship. They also help people to feel safe and that they are just as important in the open relationship as their partners.

Examples of boundaries that are set could include:

- Who (geographically and interpersonally, such as in the community, friends, family, et cetera) could be an additional partner;
- What types of physical limits are placed on that relationship (kissing, dating, or other sexual activities);
- Whether sexual relations will take place in a separate bedroom, playroom or premises (e.g. hotel).

Some couples create a physical relationship contract. These can be useful in not only negotiating, but also clearly articulating the needs, wants, limits, expectations, and commitments that are expected of the parties involved.

=== Time management ===
Adequate time management can contribute to the success of an open relationship. Even though having a serious commitment with one partner is common, negotiating the time spent among all partners is still important. Although the desire to give an unlimited amount of love, energy, and emotion to others is common, the limited amount of time in a day limits the actual time spent with each partner. Some find that if they cannot evenly distribute their time, they forego a partner. Time management can also be related to equity theory, which stresses the importance of fairness in relationships.

== Research on open marriages ==
=== Positive outcomes ===
Published 1974, a national study of sexuality conducted by Hunt found that relatively few people engage in swinging. Hunt attributed the low number of people in these open marriages to various social, psychological, and practical problems. Yet, some of these people "confirmed what the advocates and enthusiasts have claimed—namely, that marital swinging can provide physically intense experiences, that it can be immensely ego-gratifying and that it is a temporary release from confinement and responsibility and a brief chance to live out one's wildest fantasies" (pages 273–274).

Some studies show that couples in open marriages can maintain satisfying relationships. Rubin observed no differences in marital adjustment between couples in open marriages and couples in sexually monogamous marriages. Rubin and Adams reported no differences in marital satisfaction between couples in open marriages and couples in sexually monogamous relationships. Gilmartin likewise found no differences in marital satisfaction between sexually open and sexually monogamous couples. A study by Bergstrand and Willams found couples in open marriages had higher levels of satisfaction than couples in the general population.

Some couples in open marriages report high levels of satisfaction with their relationships. A study conducted by Wolf found that 76 percent of couples in open marriages described the quality of their relationships as "better than average" or "outstanding". Dixon found similarly high levels of marital satisfaction in a study of 100 bisexual and heterosexual husbands in open marriages. In another study, Dixon observed that 80 percent of wives in open marriages rated their marital compatibility as "excellent" or "good", and 76 percent of the wives rated their sexual satisfaction as "excellent" or "good". Buunk has also reported high levels of satisfaction in couples in open marriages.

Some couples feel open marriage has increased their marital satisfaction. Bergstrand and Williams collected online questionnaires from 1092 people involved in swinging style open marriages. Among those people who said they were "somewhat unhappy" or "unhappy" with their marriages before swinging, around 80–90 percent said they were happier with their marriages after they started swinging. Nearly half of people who said they were "very happy" with their marriages before swinging claimed to be even happier with their marriages after swinging. Open marriage can in some cases increase marital satisfaction.

=== Neutral outcomes ===
Couples sometimes drop out of the open marriage lifestyle and return to sexual monogamy. In a five-year study of bisexuals, 80 percent of whom initially had open relationships, Martin Weinberg, Colin J. Williams, and Douglas Pryor observed a definite shift towards sexual monogamy over time. When first interviewed, a majority of these bisexuals preferred sexual non-monogamy as their ideal form of romantic relationships. Five years later, around 60 percent had changed their views, and most of those who changed their views said sexual monogamy was their new ideal. Some of these changes were motivated by the emergence of the AIDS epidemic. Monogamy was seen as a way to avoid getting HIV/AIDS. But, for many, the shift to monogamy was due to a genuine change in what they sought in relationships. Their desire to be sexually monogamous had nothing to do with the AIDS epidemic.

Couples who try open marriages and decide to return to sexually monogamous marriages may be left with different feelings about open marriage. Some may have negative feelings about their open marriage experiences. Others may continue to "see nonmonogamy as possibly good for others but not for themselves". Overall, open marriage has a relatively neutral impact on these couples. Rubin and Adams did not observe any difference in the risk of divorce for couples in open marriages and couples in sexually monogamous marriages.

=== Negative outcomes ===
Couples in open marriages expose themselves to the potential for conflicts caused by jealousy. Studies have shown that 80 percent or more of couples in open marriages experience jealousy over their extramarital relationships. Jealousy within an open marriage can lead to potentially detrimental conflicts. For example, attempting to interfere with a rival relationship may make a partner angry. Insulting or berating a partner may provoke retaliatory responses. Demanding greater commitment may ignite arguments. Many studies have reported that conflict occurs during episodes of jealousy.

Even when jealousy is not an overwhelming problem, open relationships may cause other complications. Numerous authors have argued that open marriages disrupt relationships by interfering with intimacy and provoking insecurities.

Some couples report that open marriage contributed to their divorces. Janus and Janus asked divorced people to list the one primary reason for their divorces. Approximately 1 percent of men and 2 percent of women listed open marriage as the primary reason for their divorce. Open marriage is perceived as a primary cause of divorce in a substantial minority of the 1 to 6 percent of people who have open marriages.

The extent to which open marriage actually contributes to divorce remains uncertain. Blumstein and Schwartz note a slightly higher risk of divorce among couples who engage in extramarital sex, even if the couples agree to allow extramarital sex.

== See also ==
- Casual relationship
- Forms of nonmonogamy
- Open marriage
- Unicorn hunting
- Yes no maybe list
