= Non-monogamy =

Intimate relationship that is not strictly monogamous

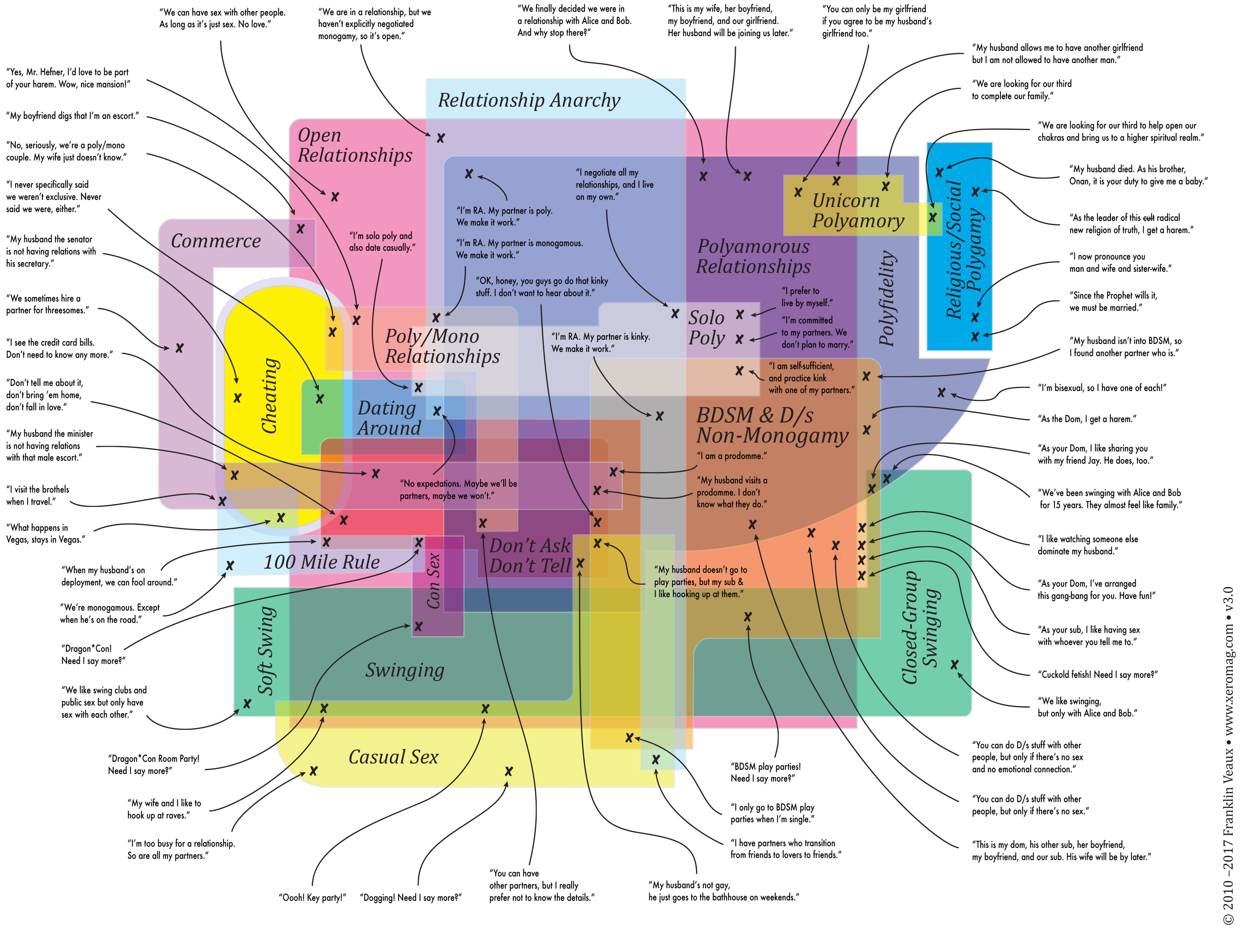
Depiction of many types of non-monogamy and how they overlap

Non-monogamy (or nonmonogamy) is an umbrella term that describes a relationship arrangement where one or more partners are not sexually and/or romantically exclusive to each other. Monogamy and non-monogamy are not strictly binary categories, but rather exist on a continuum encompassing various degrees of exclusivity and openness - at one end of this continuum lie strictly monogamous relationships, while at the other end are openly non-exclusive arrangements with numerous nuanced forms of varying degrees of openness in between. Non-monogamous relationships have been practiced across cultures and throughout history, reflecting diverse social norms, legal frameworks, and personal preferences.

In contemporary discourse, non-monogamy is understood to encompass a variety of practices, ranging from culturally institutionalised arrangements like polygamy to consensual agreements such as open relationships and polyamory, as well as non-consensual forms like infidelity.

== Major forms of non-monogamy ==
In the Western world, from a legal perspective, marrying more than one person is not permitted, as the law recognises only monogamous marriage - a union between two individuals. However, in many other regions, particularly Muslim-majority countries, polygamy is legally recognized and culturally normalized. Another key characteristic that distinguishes different forms of non-monogamous relationships is whether they are practiced with the knowledge and consent of all involved parties. These distinctions allow non-monogamy to be broadly categorised into three major forms:

- Culturally institutionalised non-monogamy refers to legally and culturally sanctioned practices of non-exclusive relationships that are formalised, regulated, and embedded within specific cultural traditions. The most prominent example is polygamy, which includes polygyny (when a man has more than one wife at the same time), and, less commonly, polyandry (when a woman has more than one husband), and polygynandry (a group marriage when more than one husband is married to more than one wife). Other culturally embedded practices, such as temporary marriages (e.g., Nikah Mut'ah in Shia Islam), may also fall under this category.
- Consensual non-monogamy (CNM), also known as ethical non-monogamy (ENM), refers to a relationship that explicitly allows for extra-dyadic romantic or sexual relationships. Consensual non-monogamy can take many different forms, depending on the needs and preferences of the individuals involved in specific relationships. The most studied and prevalent forms of consensual non-monogamy are swinging, polyamory, and open relationships. In a swinging relationship a couple tend to engage in sexual activities with people other than their primary partner, typically at a party or in another social settings. Polyamorous relationships are those in which people experience both sexual and emotional relationships with multiple partners concurrently, placing emphasis on a romantic and emotional aspects of the relationship, rather than on strictly sexual. An open relationship is a relationship arrangement in which one or both partners seek sexual relationships independently of each other. Some authors suggest the concept of relationship anarchy, which describes intimate relationships characterised by principles aligned with anarchism, that include autonomy, the rejection of hierarchies and critique of societal relationship norms. Unlike culturally institutionalised non-monogamy, CNM typically exists outside legal frameworks, as it does not involve formal marriage to multiple partners, but relies on mutual consent.
- Secretive non-monogamy (or non-consensual non-monogamy), commonly known as infidelity, adultery or cheating, refers to a situation in which one or both partners in a committed relationship engage in secret extra-dyadic sexual or romantic relationships with one or more additional partners, without the knowledge or consent of the other partner/s.

These categories are not mutually exclusive or collectively exhaustive as individual experiences often diverge from standard definitions due to the intricate nuances inherent in the complexity of human sexual relationships. The fluid and complex nature of human sexual and romantic relationships allows for diverse expressions that may not fit neatly into a single category, with subtle nuances often blurring the boundaries between these forms.

== Prevalence ==
Non-monogamy is practiced globally, but its prevalence varies significantly depending on cultural, legal, and societal factors.

- Culturally Institutionalised Non-Monogamy. Polygyny (a form of polygamy in which a man marries multiple women) is permitted in many Muslim-majority countries and is most often found in sub-Saharan Africa, where 11% of the population lives in arrangements that include more than one spouse. However, reliable statistics on the prevalence of polygamous marriages in Gulf countries and Sub-Saharan Africa are limited. Existing evidence suggests that while Islamic law permits polygamy in some regions, its actual practice is relatively uncommon and varies widely by country. For instance, the 2017-2018 Jordan Population and Family Health Survey found that approximately 4% of married women reported their husband had other wives, being most common among women with no education (13%). In contrast, the 2017 Senegal DHS reported that 32% of married women were in polygynous unions, demonstrating that rates can differ significantly across regions. Contemporary studies have identified 53 societies (out of over 1000) practicing polyandry (a form of polygamy in which a woman marries multiple men), though its prevalence within these societies is difficult to determine, with the highest recorded rate being approximately 12 percent. Polyandry is practiced in regions such as the Himalayan areas of India, Nepal, and Tibet, the Marquesas Islands in the South Pacific, and among indigenous groups like the Yanomamö in South America and the Inuit in the Arctic.
- Consensual non-monogamy. Studies suggest that CNM arrangements, such as open relationships and polyamory, are becoming increasingly visible in Western societies. It is estimated that 3%-7% of Americans, 2.5% of Canadians, around 3% of Norwegians, and 3.3% of Dutch and Flemish are engaged in consensual non-monogamy at an any given time and around a quarter of the Americans, Canadians, Norwegians, and Dutch and Flemish at least once have engaged in a consensually non-monogamous relationship in their lifetime. In two surveys in 2013 and 2014, one fifth of surveyed single United States adults had, at some point in their lives, engaged in consensual non-monogamy. YouGov poll reported that in 2020 about one-third of US adults believe that "their ideal relationship is non-monogamous to some degree" and in 2024 9% of Brits have been or would like to be in a polyamorous relationship.
- Secretive non-monogamy. Measuring the prevalence of infidelity presents significant methodological challenges, as estimates vary depending on the research design, sample population, and the definition of adultery used by the researchers. Studies differ in whether they categorize infidelity as sexual, emotional, or both, and they rely on respondents’ subjective interpretations of what behaviors qualify as unfaithful – ranging from sexual intercourse to kissing, or even online interactions like cybersex. Additionally, infidelity is often underreported due to associated guilt and shame, leading to potential biases in self-reported data. Typically, studies report infidelity rates in the range from 25% to 75%. Infidelity is generally more common among cohabiting and dating couples than married couples and has been found to show seasonal variation, peaking during summer months due to travel and reduced chances of detection. While older studies report men engaging in infidelity more often than women, more recent studies report that men and women engage in infidelity at similar rates. However, men tend to report their extra-dyadic relationships as more sexual, while women report theirs as more emotional.

== Legal frameworks of non-monogamy ==
=== Culturally institutionalised non-monogamy ===
Polygyny is legally recognised and regulated in many Muslim-majority countries, where Islamic law permits a man to marry up to four wives under specific conditions. In some countries like Saudi Arabia, Iran, Qatar, Jordan, Yemen, Algeria, and Mauritania polygyny is legal and regulated by a Family Law. In other countries like Pakistan, Egypt, Iraq, Syria, Morocco, Indonesia and Malaysia polygyny is allowed only under conditions like first wife’s disability or infertility, requires the written consent of the first wife and sometimes of a judge. However, over the past several decades, some of the Muslim-majority countries have experienced significant reforms in Muslim Family Law and several countries have taken steps to ban polygyny, reflecting changing societal attitudes and efforts to promote gender equality. For example, Tunisia banned polygyny as part of its family law reform under president Habib Bourguiba in 1956. As part of Mustafa Kemal Atatürk's secular reforms, Turkey banned polygyny in 1926, replacing Islamic family law with a Swiss-inspired civil code. In Kazakhstan, Uzbekistan, Kyrgyzstan, and Tajikistan polygyny was prohibited under Soviet law and these bans were reaffirmed or codified into new national family laws in 1998 after these countries regained independence.

Polyandry is considered incompatible with Sharia law and is therefore not recognised in Muslim-majority countries. Polyandry persists informally in certain traditional societies, such as in the Himalayan regions of Tibet and Nepal, where fraternal polyandry helps preserve family property and manage limited agricultural land, and among communities like the Toda tribe in South India and parts of Himachal Pradesh, though it is not legally recognised.

In the United States, Canada, all European countries, and Russia, marriage is legally defined as a union between two individuals, and no form of polygamy is legally recognised. In the United States and Canada, polygamy is strictly prohibited, with violations resulting in criminal penalties such as fines or imprisonment. Across Europe, polygamous marriages are not recognised due to public policy conflicts, gender equality principles, and fundamental legal values. For example, in France and Germany, polygamy is not recognised under civil law, and attempts to enter into such unions can result in criminal charges, denial of marital benefits, or annulment of subsequent marriages. Polygamy is broadly unrecognised in European countries, posing challenges for asylum seekers with multiple spouses, as typically only one spouse is granted a residence permit and international protection. However, some countries may evaluate such cases individually, considering specific circumstances.

=== Consensual non-monogamy ===
Unlike polygamy, CNM does not involve multiple legally recognised marriages but instead consists of consensual agreements between adults to engage in multiple romantic or sexual relationships. This distinction allows CNM to operate within the bounds of the law in jurisdictions where monogamy is the legal marital standard. At the same time, the lack of legal recognition for CNM relationships means they are excluded from many legal protections, such as inheritance rights, hospital visitation, spousal visas, and parental responsibilities, as existing legal frameworks typically do not accommodate multiple concurrent partnerships. However, in recent years Canada and some of the U.S. states have taken steps toward recognising CNM relationships. In April 2018, the Newfoundland and Labrador Supreme Court in Canada recognized three adults in a polyamorous relationship as the legal parents of a child, marking a significant precedent in family law. Similarly, in June 2020, Somerville, Massachusetts, became the first U.S. city to adopt an ordinance permitting domestic partnerships involving more than two adults, thereby legally recognising CNM relationships.

Consensually non-monogamous relationships have no legal recognition in Muslim-majority countries, and extramarital relationships, even consensual, are typically criminalised.

=== Secretive non-monogamy ===
Secretive non-monogamy (non-consensual non-monogamy), commonly referred to as infidelity or adultery, is addressed differently across global legal frameworks, with variations based on cultural, religious, and societal norms. In most Western nations like the United States, Canada, and much of Europe, while viewed as a moral transgression, infidelity is not punishable under criminal law. Conversely, in several Muslim-majority countries and others with laws influenced by religious doctrine, infidelity is criminalised under adultery laws. Countries such as Saudi Arabia, Iran, and Pakistan classify extramarital relationships as criminal acts, with punishments ranging from fines and imprisonment to flogging or, in extreme cases, capital punishment. Marital infidelity is explicitly recognised as grounds for divorce under the laws of Iraq, Algeria and the United Arab Emirates. In some jurisdictions, infidelity laws apply differently based on gender, with women often facing harsher consequences than men.

== Social attitudes toward non-monogamy ==
Universal relationship pros and cons can be isolated. Choosing (for or against) monogamy may be about fewer factors, like preserving bandwidth versus exploring abundance.

In Western cultures, monogamy is widely regarded as superior to relationships involving multiple partners. This preference for monogamous relationships is often referred to as mononormativity or monocentrism.

Consensually non-monogamous individuals face widespread stigma and are often misunderstood due to various stereotypes and myths. One of them is that those in CNM relationships are primarily motivated by a desire for more sex, leading to an increased risk of sexually transmitted infections. Studies have found that individuals practicing consensual non-monogamy are more likely to engage in safer sex practices and less likely to use condoms incorrectly compared to individuals who engage in extra-dyadic sex within ostensibly monogamous relationships or compared to monogamous population. This can be explained by CNM individuals tending towards prioritizing open communication and explicit agreements about sexual boundaries, which often include discussions about safer sex practices.

Several studies have explored societal attitudes toward different forms of CNM relationships, but the findings are often conflicting and inconclusive. While some research indicates more positive attitudes toward polyamorous relationships, emphasising emotional and romantic connections. Other studies suggest that swinging or group sex, which focus primarily on sexual activity, are viewed more favourably. In some circles, Polyamory has also been referred to as Ethical Non-Monogamy(ENM) and a subset of the more broad concept of Consensual Non-Monogamy (CNM). The Validity of this draws on Consent being a necessary, but not sufficient, condition for ethical behavior. Where the concepts of commitment in Polyamory demonstrate an aim to build deep connections responsibly; fostering a lasting support -even from short terms of intimacy- forming a defense against external objectification and other potentially problematic subjective circumstances. This isolates it from other forms of CNM, and may reflect as Virtue signalling leading to pushback from the proponents of, the historically more established, CNM.

Social attitudes toward secretive non-monogamy are overwhelmingly negative across most cultures. While being the most prevalent form of non-monogamy and as common as monogamy, secretive non-monogamy is widely condemned due to its association with betrayal, dishonesty, and the violation of trust within relationships. Factors such as societal gender norms, power dynamics, and the perceived acceptability of infidelity within certain contexts (e.g., among men versus women) influence attitudes toward secretive non-monogamy. Additionally, individuals in different relationship forms (e.g. dating, in a relationship, engaged, marriage, cohabiting, polyamory, etc.) might have different views on what constitutes infidelity. Research shows that people in different cultures view infidelity in very different ways. In collectivist societies, like many in East Asia or the Middle East, infidelity (especially sexual infidelity by women) is often seen as a serious threat to family honour. In contrast, individualist societies, such as those in Western Europe and North America, tend to focus more on personal trust and emotional honesty.

== Other minor forms of non-monogamy ==
While it is tempting to categorise non-monogamy in broad categories, human relationships are complex and multifaceted with many terms emerging to reflect the nuanced nature of non-monogamous arrangements. Some people use the term "monogamish" to describe relationships that are primarily monogamous but allow for some degree of flexibility in terms of sexual or romantic experiences outside the primary partnership. Partners in such relationships may, for example, agree to occasional flings, participation in group activities, or other consensual experiences that do not threaten the emotional core of their partnership. Similarly, the term "don't ask, don't tell" is used to describe a relationship arrangement where partners tacitly agree to allow sexual or romantic activities outside the primary relationship, but without explicitly discussing or disclosing the details of those activities.

== See also ==
- Adultery
- Extramarital sex
- Group sex
- Infidelity
- List of polyamorous characters in fiction
- Open relationship
- Plaçage
- Polyandry
- Polygamy
- Polygyny
- Romantic orientation
- Sexual revolution
