= Omorashi =

Bladder incontinence fetishism

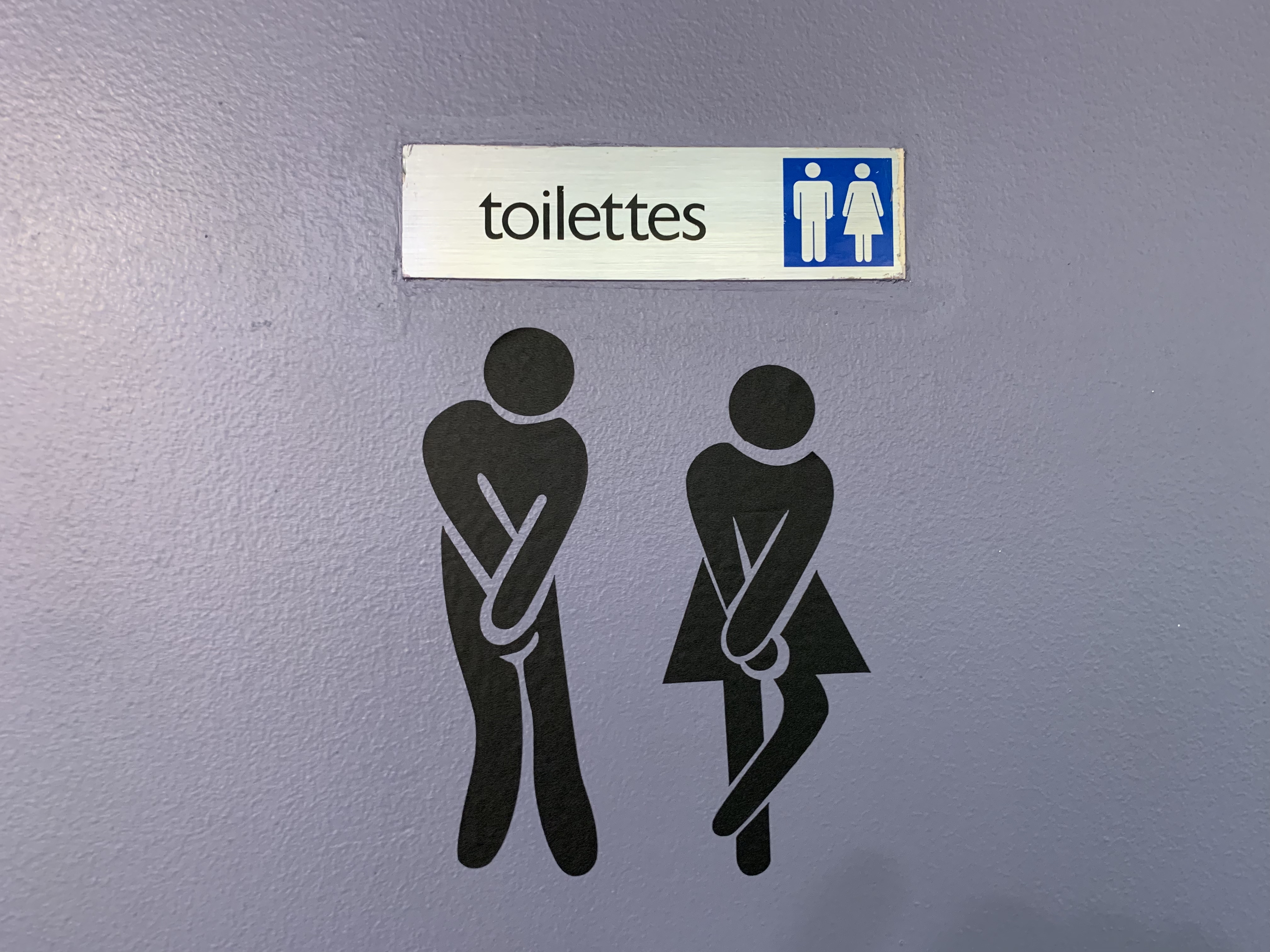
People who have this fetish tend to get aroused at the sight of people with full bladders.

Omorashi (Japanese: おもらし / オモラシ / お漏らし; IPA: [o̞mo̞ɾa̠ɕi]; lit. 'to wet oneself'), sometimes abbreviated as omo, is a form of fetish subculture first categorized and predominantly recognized in Japan, in which a person experiences arousal from the idea or feeling of having a full bladder and potentially wetting themself, or from witnessing another person in that situation.

While urinary desperation and "wetting" fetishes are not inherently or exclusively Japanese, the clear distinction and definition of "omorashi" as a specific sub-genre of urolagnia media has turned it into a loan-word amongst fetish communities worldwide.

Sub-genres of omorashi include "omorashi yagai" (public urinary desperation or wetting), "omutsu omorashi" (wetting oneself in a diaper), bedwetting, as well as a wide variety of cross-over with other garment fetishes.

== Terminology ==
Outside of Japan, "omorashi" has not always been clearly distinguished from the broader categories of urolagnia or "water sports", of which omorashi can be considered a specific form or sub-genre. In recent times, however, the Japanese-language loan-word "omorashi" (or "omo" for short) has grown popular and well-understood by fetish communities worldwide.

The Handbook of Clinical Sexuality for Mental Health Professionals specifically defines omorashi as the persistent sexual arousal toward a full bladder. Dr. J. Paul Fedoroff acknowledges this distinction, observing that "the theme of taking control of autonomic process is prominent in the paraphilia known as omorashi, which involves sexual arousal associated with the sensation of needing to urinate due to a full bladder." Westerners who make the distinction sometimes use the term "bladder desperation" or "pee desperation" to do so, though increasingly fetish communities in the West have taken to adopt the Japanese-language terminology.

The word is also occasionally romanized as "omorasi" in the Kunrei-shiki romanization system.

In the English-speaking BDSM community, the term "bathroom use control" is used to describe a specific form of omorashi play in which the dominant controls how, when and whether the submissive is allowed to use the bathroom.

== Variations ==
There are various ways in which omorashi is practiced, giving rise to a number of sub-genres.

=== Yagai (Public) ===
One of the variations is known as omorashi yagai, which translates as "to wet oneself outdoors (or publicly)." A further variation includes yagai hōnyō, or "outdoor (or public) urination", in which the subject publicly removes their clothes to urinate. Other yagai hōnyō practitioners operate much like graffiti artists, attempting public urination acts without being caught.

=== Omutsu (Diapers) ===
Another variation of omorashi play is omutsu play (おむつプレイ). It is also known as omutsu omorashi (おむつおもらし) or, less commonly, oshime omorashi (おしめおもらし), both of which translate as "to wet oneself in a diaper." The omutsu variation is essentially the same as the standard omorashi except that the participants are wearing a diaper. Thus, people specifically interested in this aspect of the subculture can also be considered a subset of the diaper lover community.

As a form of diaper fetishism with an added emphasis on urinary desperation and wetting, participants likely experience increased sexual arousal from the presence and use of adult diapers.

However, diapers may also be favorable for their convenience during public wetting scenes because they render wetting more discreet and eliminate mess, lowering the potential social impact of omorashi play. As such, their use is not solely limited to those with a diaper fetish.

In Japan, acceptance of adult diaper use is comparatively high, with the market for such products growing as much as 6–10% a year. However, these are largely intended for and worn by the elderly, with the growth due to Japan's aging population, and younger people wearing these have met with some criticism. In 2012, the Japanese magazine SPA ran an article entitled "The Ultimate Form of Slob", which criticized the trend of young Japanese women who wear diapers to avoid public restrooms. The article included an interview with a 25-year-old woman who had been wearing diapers "instead of going to the toilet" for a period of six months, "wearing [them] almost every day."

=== Clothing fetishism ===
Omorashi can easily overlap with garment fetishism, as some people may enhance their arousal by incorporating specific articles of clothing into their omorashi play.

For example, some individuals find it attractive when someone wets themself in a skirt, since it allows for upskirt views of the wetting. This is referred to as sukāto omorashi (スカートおもらし). This can combine with uniform fetishism, and pornography with skirted performers dressed as high school girls and office workers is common, as well as depictions of skirted people in casual dress.

== Sexuality in omorashi media ==
Most fetish activities concerning the use of bodily waste are considered by the general public as "hardcore" or taboo. However, because the object of the fetish is clothed incontinence, omorashi media does not necessarily feature direct sexual contact, though some use it as a form of foreplay. The focus on clothed (rather than overtly sexual images) makes garment fetishism a prominent feature in most omorashi erotica: commonly featured outfits include school uniforms, those worn by working professionals, and other people attempting to look dignified before succumbing to the need to urinate.

Fetishists who are into this kink may have specific scenarios they enjoy, such as while waiting in line for a bathroom or just doing it in front of the toilet.

== Inside of Japan ==
=== Fetish films ===
To avoid Japan's strict censorship laws, which limited depictions of actual sex and pubic hair, erotic films (known as pink films) often relied on fetish elements which could skirt such restrictions. One such film, Terrifying Girls' High School: Lynch Law Classroom in 1973, was the first to depict an omorashi scenario to a cinematic audience. The video depicts a high school girl wetting herself on her desk after drinking gallons of water.

As the AV (adult video) genre took hold in the 1980s, videos specifically devoted to omorashi began to appear. However, perhaps because of its softcore nature, omorashi never became a clearly pornographic genre.

Today, Japanese omorashi fans also enjoy game show-style videos in which contestants must compete in various urine-holding challenges. The Giga video company's "Desperation Tournament" series is an example of this kind of contest. One such activity is a panel of contestants competing to hold their bladders, or to guess which woman has to use the restroom the most.

=== Periodicals ===
Since the 1990s, magazine companies catering to the Japanese kink community have produced a number of periodicals dedicated to omorashi subculture, including most notably Sanwa Publishing's Omorashi Club (おもらし倶楽部, Omorashi Kurabu). First published September 22, 1994, Omorashi Club's success allowed Sanwa to extend the brand in 2006 to include a DVD magazine. The following year, the demand for material catering specifically to omutsu omorashi fandom led to further expansion with the spin-off periodical Diapers Club (おむつ倶楽部, Omutsu Kurabu). The scarcity of earlier issues of these magazines has caused them to become collector's items.

=== Anime and manga ===
Japanese-produced omorashi media also include manga and anime. These range from independently produced dōjinshi to large, commercially produced manga. Some focus exclusively on omorashi stories, while others include only the occasional scene. Some contain obvious sexual themes and could be considered a form of H manga, while others, like Mizutamari no dekiru asa, are well known to be suitable for all ages, since they have only mild ecchi content such as panchira.

Wetting scenes have existed in anime as early as the popular Doraemon and Devilman series of the 1970s. However, these did not have the erotic context which characterizes modern omorashi media, since they predated the first full-blown anime pornography, which was not available until 1984, when the advent of the first Hentai OVAs such as Wonder Kids' Lolita Anime were made possible by the widespread availability of home video. One example of this later erotic context is the 1994 Hentai OVA Vixens, which features scenes of incontinence in a setting that is overtly sexual.

=== Eroge ===
The crossover of omorashi and anime fandom has produced a number of eroge such as Water Closet: The Forbidden Chamber, which are specifically focused on omorashi. The limited popularity of omorashi in the West has prompted a number of programmers in the scene to create software patches for these Japanese games which translate the on screen text into English.

Some eroge game designers have capitalized on the omorashi fandom's niche market by including the occasional wetting scene in their games as a selling point. MAID iN HEAVEN SuperS, for example, which contains only a single, diapered wetting scene, was used to spin off an entire set of collectible figures in various omorashi poses.

=== Collectibles ===
With the translation of omorashi into manga and its subsequent adoption by otaku fandom, a number of omorashi themed collectibles have appeared on the Japanese market, including figurines and "Shizukuishi kyuun kyuun toilet paper" printed with wetting scenes featuring the character Shizukuishi from the omorashi manga, Iinari! Aibure-shon.

=== Games ===
Omorashi content can be found in video games, predominantly Japanese ones. These games often include a bladder meter in which a bar is used to represent a character's urinary continence, tending for a higher percentage correlating to higher chance of a character leaking. These games also usually have toilets and changing stations (in case of accidents) scattered throughout the map.

== Outside of Japan ==
Though there is a small community devoted to such fetishism outside Japan, it is usually overshadowed by the more popular fetishes, urolagnia and urophagia. Vice Media has documented an account of an omorashi community existing in the United States since at least 1970. Outside Japan omorashi groups sometimes refer to their shared interest as "desperation/wetting" fetishism, often making a distinction between content featuring males and females. In 2018, People magazine and the New York Post reported the use of the English language portmanteau word "peegasm" among people who practiced "releasing urine after a long period of time" to achieve "a stimulation of pelvic nerves" that "could feel like an orgasmic response." Some English language fetish websites with a focus on females simply identify as "panty wetting." Since such sites abandon the "desperation" title which implies an effort not to wet, they are more likely to include nudity, overtly sexual models and situations, as well as purposeful (as opposed to accidental) wetting. There are still communities which focus on the more tame or softcore aspects of omorashi, which are generally focused on simple wetting in fully or semi-clothed situations without the overtly sexual models and situations. However, this softcore side is more rare in English-speaking communities than the more explicitly sexual omorashi content.

Though there is generally no wide acceptance of incontinence-based play, studies in England have shown that urinary incontinence during sexual activity is a "common, but rarely volunteered symptom" observed in 24% of sexually active women. Moreover, no connection could be identified with any specific abnormality of bladder function associated with these symptoms, indicating that such leakage is both normal and healthy.

=== Western publications and media ===
Because of the western stigma in numerous countries against urine, omorashi subculture has not received such diverse exposure in non-Japanese media. In some countries, governments have even banned such materials. In New Zealand for example, creating, trading, distributing (e.g., making available on one's web page) anything promoting or supporting "the use of urine or excrement in association with degrading or dehumanising conduct or sexual conduct" is a felony punishable by up to ten years in jail. Nonetheless, urination is a common fetish in pornography; the 1915 film A Free Ride, widely considered the first pornographic film made in the US, contains scenes of urination.

==== Print ====
The underground Victorian erotic memoir My Secret Life features detailed descriptions of a fetish for urination, with the author saying "I recollect being very curious indeed about the way girls piddled after this, and seeing them piddle became a taste I have kept all my life." James Joyce mentioned the fetish briefly in his love letters to Nora Barnacle, mentioning a sexual fantasy of a woman "all the time pissing her drawers with pleasure and letting off soft warm quiet little farts behind". Another early example of urination and skirt-wetting appearing in a sexualized context in the west can be found in the 1928 erotic novel Story of the Eye by Georges Bataille.

Underground periodicals dedicated to pants wetting subculture outside of Japan began to appear in the 1991 with the British underground magazine Cascade, which collected erotic letters related to the fetish that occasionally appeared in older publications such as Fiesta and combined them with original stories, drawings, and photography. This was followed in 1993 by the Australia-based Wet Set Magazine. Wet Set publications were originally only available in English, but readership in German speaking countries proved high enough to justify printing some materials in German. Such publications facilitated the burgeoning subculture by providing opportunities for contact between its members via personal ads. The importance of these printed materials declined with the advent of the internet, and both Cascade and Wet Set ceased publication of physical magazines in the 21st century as the subculture shifted increasingly toward message boards and social media.

Though Wet Set did not generally acknowledge the comparatively large Asian fan base over any other country, it exposed its readers to the Japanese kink community through articles reporting on that subculture's activities. During the 21st century, some Western writers on the subject of omorashi began to recognize the Asian influence upon the subculture in a more direct way. For instance, in a February 2006 issue of The Brooklyn Rail, American poet Garrett Caples of Oakland, California chose to describe the shooting of an omorashi film in a Japanese setting. Aside from lending Western omorashi media an "authentic" quality, the inclusion of Japanese models and settings might also be seen as an attempt to play upon the stereotype of ultrapassivity globally associated with Asian women, further enhancing their perceived moe qualities and catering to Asian fetishists.

==== Film ====
In the 1993 film The Cement Garden, themed around incest, a boy tickles his older sister until she urinates in her skirt, with an upskirt view of her wet underwear. The 2002 award-winning film Secretary depicts a scene of bathroom use control in which the submissive has to sit in a chair until she wets her dress.

=== Fashion ===
==== Advent of incontinence fashion ====
Despite omorashi subculture's intrinsic relationship to garment fetishism, taboos in the west against relating sexuality and urine prevented mainstream acceptance of overtly sexual garments related to incontinence until the 21st century, when New Zealand-based underwear brand Confitex debuted a line of incontinence lingerie at New Zealand Fashion Week 2015. The organizers stated in a press release that "This is the first time, anywhere worldwide, that incontinence underwear has graced a catwalk as a designer range." In Cosmopolitan magazine's coverage of the event, they proclaimed that "You Can Feel Sexy Even if You Leak," despite the ban existing in that country against promoting or supporting incontinence-based play. The Sweden-based brand TENA subsequently followed the precedent set by Confitex with their Silhoutte Noir line of disposable incontinence undergarments, which were designed to "dismantle taboos around incontinence." Anna McCrory, senior brand manager for TENA UK, explained the goal of the product as "helping women to feel sexy, confident and able to wear what they like without being restricted by the colour or shape of their underwear, an important step towards normalising incontinence." According to the Canadian Trademarks Database, the word "Omutsu" began to be used in Canada for a line of designer adult diapers in 2017, catering specifically to the omutsu omorashi community in that country.

Similar sentiments regarding fashion as a tool for overcoming stigmas against adults wetting themselves were previously expressed by the organizers of a 2008 Japanese fashion show for adult diapers aimed at Japan's increasingly elderly population, in which an organizer stated that "Diapers are something that people don't want to look at, but if you make them attractive, then people can learn about them more easily."

==== Effect on industry ====
In 2021, NorthShore Care Supply (the leading direct-to-consumer brand of high absorbency adult diapers and incontinence supplies in the United States) published a statement via their website regarding people who wear their products out of preference rather than medical need. It affirmed that "people who wear adult diapers (aka tab-style briefs) voluntarily [...] have been the best thing to happen to the incontinence products industry since the invention of adhesive tape." According to the website, such people have "driven the whole category past the thin industrial products, past the drug store or even national brands, and into a place where there is a size, fit, thickness, absorbency, color, and yes, even print, for every imaginable application. They are hugely responsible for the mindboggling variety we have to choose from."

== See also ==
- Functional incontinence
- Panty fetishism
- Salirophilia
- Urolagnia
