= Clothing fetish =

Sexual fetish relating to particular type of clothing

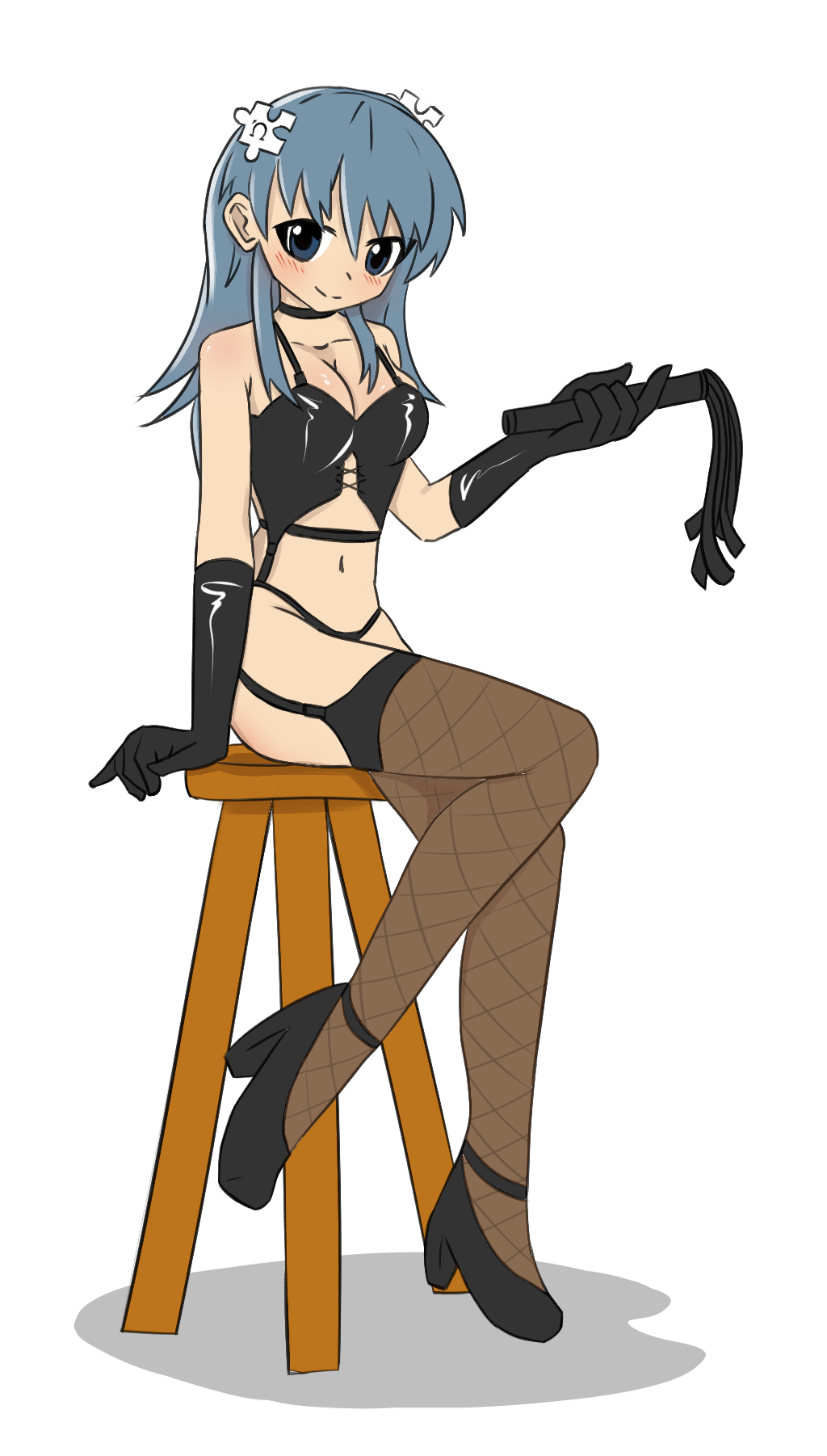
An illustration of Wikipe-tan in a stylized softcore adult-themed costume, featuring fishnet stockings, stiletto heels, and latex gloves, while holding a whip

Clothing fetishism or garment fetishism is a sexual fetish that revolves around a fixation upon a particular article or type of clothing, a particular fashion or uniform, a costume or a person dressed in such a style.

The clinical definition of a sexual fetish requires that a person be fixated on a specific garment to the extent that it exists as a recurrent (or exclusive) stimulus for sexual gratification.

An individual with a clothing fetish may be aroused by the sight of a person wearing a particular garment, like a costume or a uniform, or by wearing the clothing themselves. The arousal may come from the look one achieves by wearing the clothes or the way it feels while it is being worn. In the latter case, arousal may originate from the way its fabric feels (see clothing fetish by fabric type) or from the way the garment feels and functions as a whole (restrictive clothing being an example).

Others may also derive pleasure from collecting or destroying the fetishised garments.

== Relative prevalence of garment fetishism ==
In order to determine the relative prevalence of various clothing fetishes, the University of Bologna researchers obtained a sample of at least 5000 individuals worldwide from 381 Internet discussion groups. The prevalence was estimated based on (a) the number of groups devoted to a particular fetish, (b) the number of individuals participating in the groups and (c) the number of messages exchanged. The top garment fetish was clothes worn on the legs or buttocks of women (such as stockings or skirts), followed by footwear, underwear, whole-body wear (such as costumes and coats), and upper-body wear (such as jackets or waistcoats).

== By garment type ==
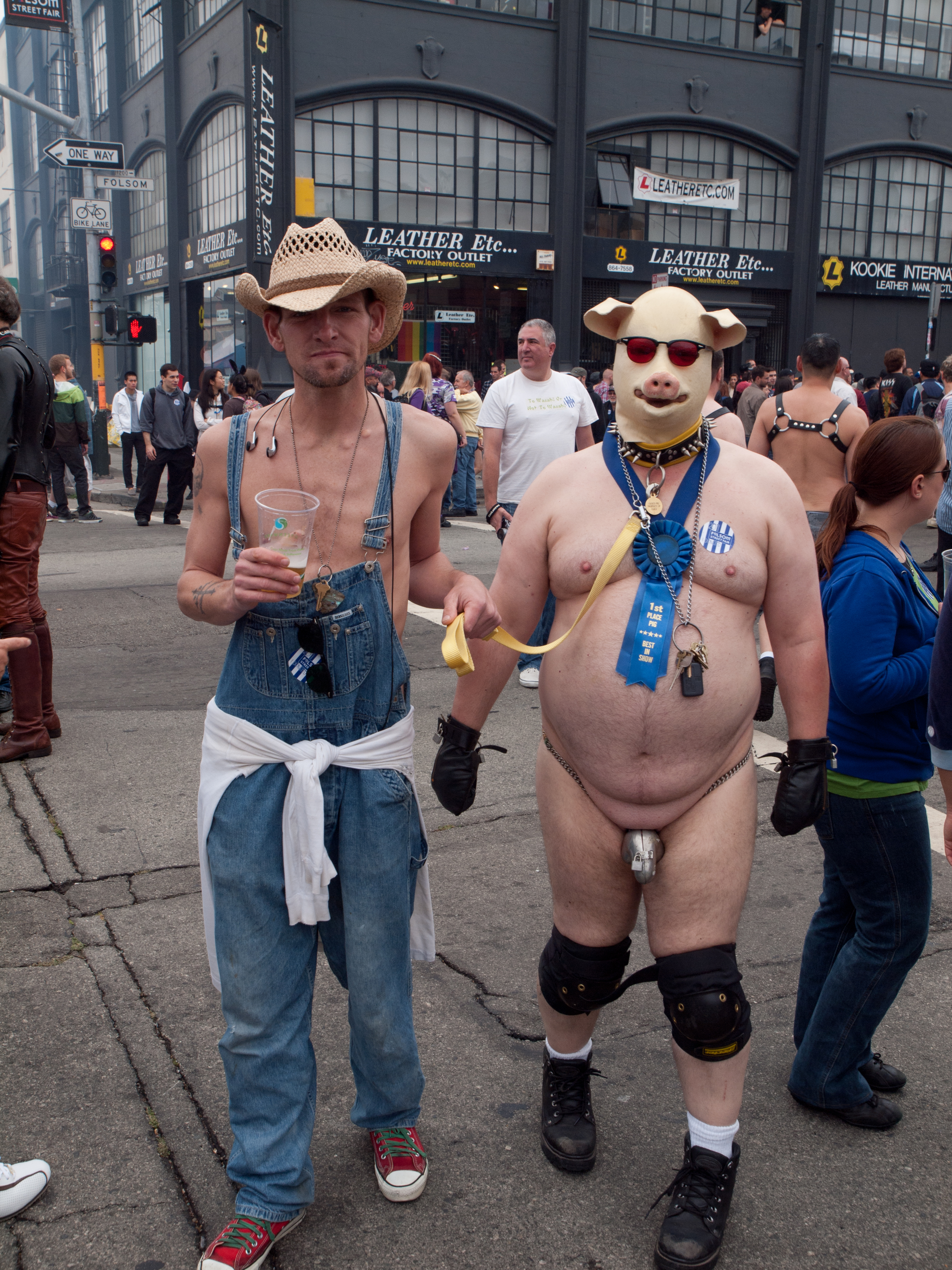
Farmer and pig costumes

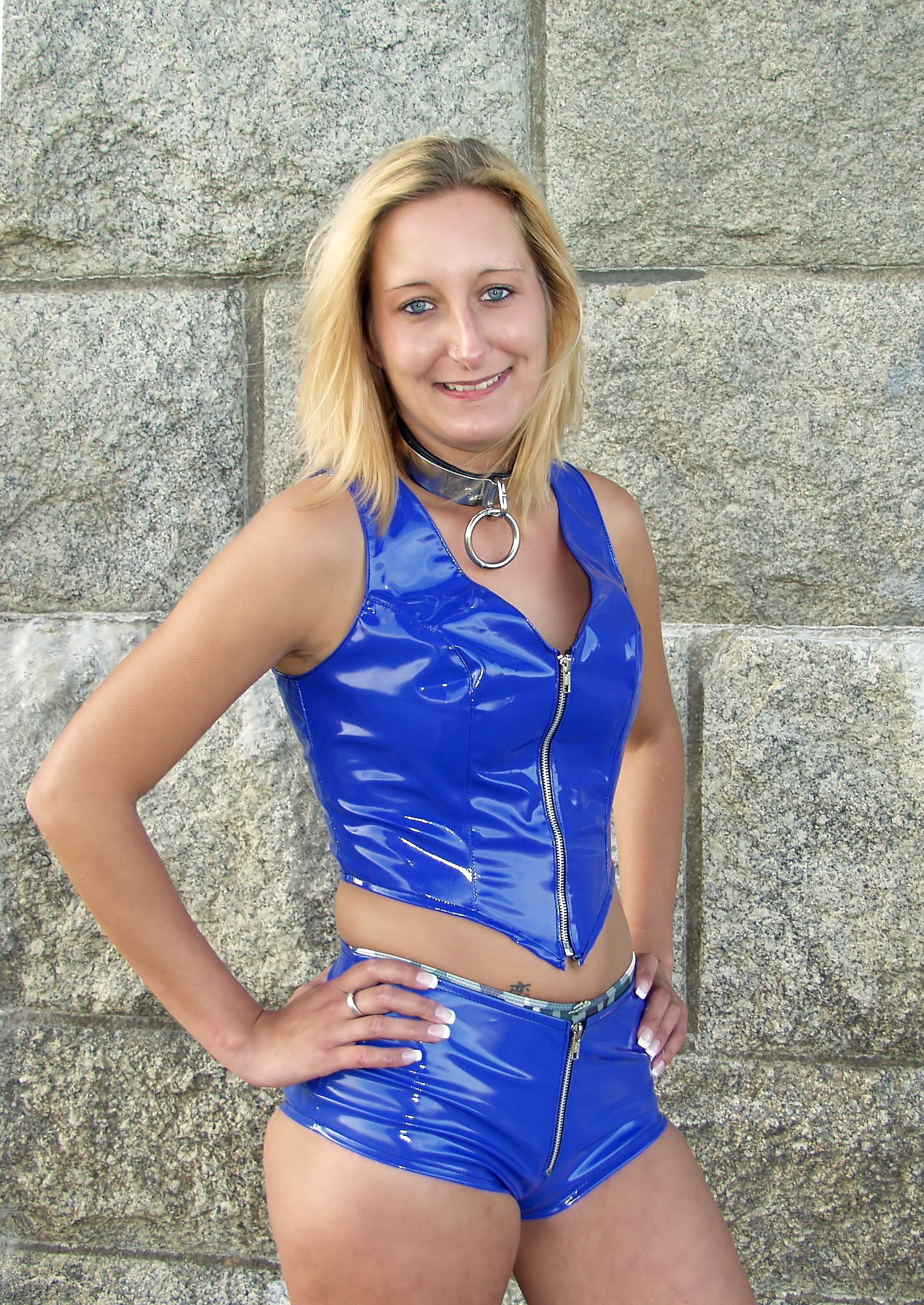
Woman wearing blue PVC shorts and top

Although almost any type of garment in theory can be the subject of a fetish, common clothing fetishes include footwear, female underwear and uniforms. A wide range of other garments have been the subject of less common fetishes.

Separate from fetishes as a paraphilia are garments worn to enhance appearance, such as tight jeans or other eye-catching clothing. The difference is whether, for the person concerned, the clothing is the focus of a sexual fetish, or is merely appreciated and found pleasing.

=== Restrictive clothing ===
Clothing that limits the wearer's movement is commonly used for this property, particularly among bondage enthusiasts, and often appears in bondage-related fetish fashion. Such restrictive fashion includes corsets, collars, strait jackets, and hobble skirts.

==== Corsets ====
The training corset and bondage corset has also become a staple in fetish wear, particularly among professional dominants. A submissive or slave may also be forced to wear a tightly laced corset as a form of punishment or simply restriction. And the masochistic practice known as tightlacing creates a particular type of pleasure for the wearer. In the 1980s, pop music performers such as Madonna and Cyndi Lauper reintroduced and popularized the corset as a daring example of underwear as outerwear. This influence continues to the present day in both fetish and mainstream fashion.

==== Hobble skirts ====
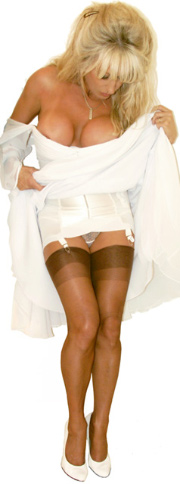
Lingerie model wearing full-fashioned stockings, with an open-bottom girdle, see-through panties, and high heels

A hobble skirt is a long, tight skirt, extending below the knees and often ankle length, which is so tight that it is difficult to walk in. When used as fetish clothing, it is often made of latex or PVC and sometimes corseted, to increase the restriction.

Such skirts were briefly a mainstream fashion in the 1910s; however, they were soon abandoned as impractical. They were revived in the 1950s by John Willie and others as a bondage/fetish style.

=== Stockings and socks ===
Stocking fetishists usually find sexual partners clothed in sheer nylon or silk stockings to be sexually stimulating, or find the act of a person donning or removing a pair of stockings arousing. Some men find it arousing to collect and wear stockings, sometimes hidden under a pair of trousers.

Like feet and shoes, sock fetishists often require some specific attraction in the object which may include particular styles or knit patterns. People with a fetish for socks may have no special attraction to feet or shoes.

Many male sock fetishists are also highly specific regarding the nature of the socks that stimulate them, and this may be a product of exposure to particular types of clothing during the teenage years. This belief is supported by observations that the nature of sock fetishism appears to differentiate according to age brackets and periods of clothing trends. Among men who exhibit an interest in women's socks who were in their early pubescent period during the late 1980s/early 1990s when slouch socks were a popular clothing trend, there is a tendency to exhibit a strong interest in very heavy slouchy socks, whereas younger men with a sock fetish tend to show greater interest in the short ankle-style socks that became popular in later years. There is also a regional trend in sock fetishes, with men who spent their teenage years living in northern climates exhibiting a strong interest in heavy wool socks.

=== Sneakers ===
Sneaker fetishism is another specific form of shoe fetishism. Like boot fetishism, it can be accompanied by a fetish for the material from which it is made. For example, the rubber which the outsole and sidewall are made of can be a source of rubber fetishism. Sneakers and other types of athletic footwear (such as football boots) are popular items to be fetishized over within certain LGBT subcultures, sometimes due to their association with athletes; particular models of sneaker (for instance certain models of Nike Air Max) are coveted by homosexual sneaker fetishists.

=== Swimwear ===
Swimwear fetishism is a sexual fetish relating to swimwear. It can also involve printed or electronic material with swimwear being worn.

=== Jackets and coats ===
Jacket fetishism is usually associated with the fixation or attraction to jackets – though it can also be associated with leather or down jackets, particularly in association with Bondage (BDSM). In a survey, researchers at the University of Bologna found that 9% of members of online fetish groups were in groups related to upper-body wear such as jackets.

=== Jeans ===
The style and cut of jeans can also enhance their sexual appeal to fetishists of either gender. Jeans without pockets on the back are sometimes viewed as showing off one's buttocks and therefore more flattering. Stretch jeans are often viewed as attractive because they have the appearance of being skin-tight, while not binding like regular denim jeans would. One example of fetish denim is "zip-around jeans", so called because they unzip from the front all the way around to the back. Other popular styles include the lace up jean and multi button style jeans.

=== T-shirts ===
A T-shirt fetish is often compared with Wet T-shirt fetishism seen at some public events (such as wet T-shirt contests) or on websites with wet T-shirt fetish videos, but there is debate about whether or not it should be treated as a clothing fetish.

=== Shorts ===
A shorts fetish involves sexual arousal triggered by short shorts, hotpants, bike shorts, yoga shorts or other variations of athletic shorts such as basketball shorts or gym shorts. One with this fetish can experience arousal which may be triggered from youthful experiences of being attracted to their peers wearing shorts. Some cross dressers also experience excitement from wearing short shorts designed for opposing gender, finding the style, look and feel, and texture of the fabric stimulating. Others may enjoy relieving sexual pleasure while wearing them, or even fantasizing having intercourse while wearing shorts.

=== Diapers ===
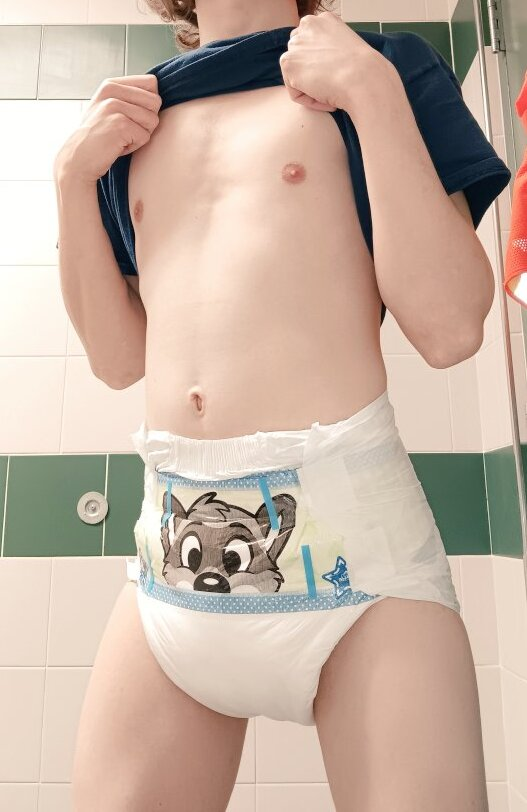
A man wearing an ABDL-oriented adult diaper

People with a diaper fetish (colloquially dubbed "diaper lovers" or "DLs" for short) are attracted to idea of themselves or others wearing adult diapers.

Arousal can be derived from the idea of the diaper itself, the materials (plastic, cloth, SAP, etc.) that they are made from, the urolagnic or scatologic connection to using them, as well as how they potentially relate to fetishes like BDSM, ageplay, medical roleplay, etc.

Though separate, diapers are also such a typical component of adult baby roleplay that an umbrella term, "adult baby/diaper lover" (or "ABDL"), is commonly used to refer to a spectrum of fetish subcultures.

== Gender-related clothes ==
Fetishism may include various garments typically worn by or associated with a particular gender or gender expression. For example, this could describe an individual who is attracted to people wearing masculine-associated clothing items, like basketball shorts or a man's suit. Certain gender-related elements of clothes could be the source of a fetish, include lace, ruffles, floral print, embroidery, back closures, or various colors (such as mauve and pink).

== Uniforms ==
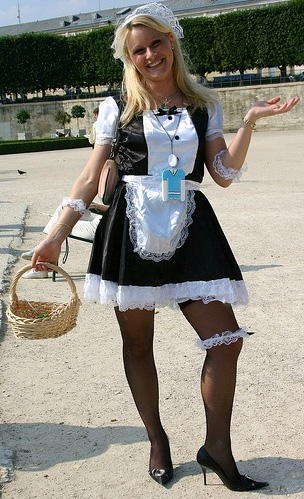
Woman in a French maid outfit, Paris

Among the most common uniforms to fetish are those of a doctor, schoolgirl, police officer, military officer, nurse, French maid, sports player, waitress, cheerleader and Playboy Bunny. Some people also regard nuns' habits or even aprons as uniforms. Sometimes, a uniform may be used appropriate to what is being done. For example, someone may wear a nurse's uniform to administer an enema, a police uniform to handcuff and cage someone, or two equals dress as inmates for cellmate-on-cellmate activities in a prison setting or as submissive to a third (guard) player. This may add a sense of authenticity to the game play.

== By fabric type ==
=== Fur ===
Venus with a Mirror by Tiziano Vecellio (c. 1555) inspired Leopold von Sacher-Masoch's novel Venus im Pelz (Venus in Furs).

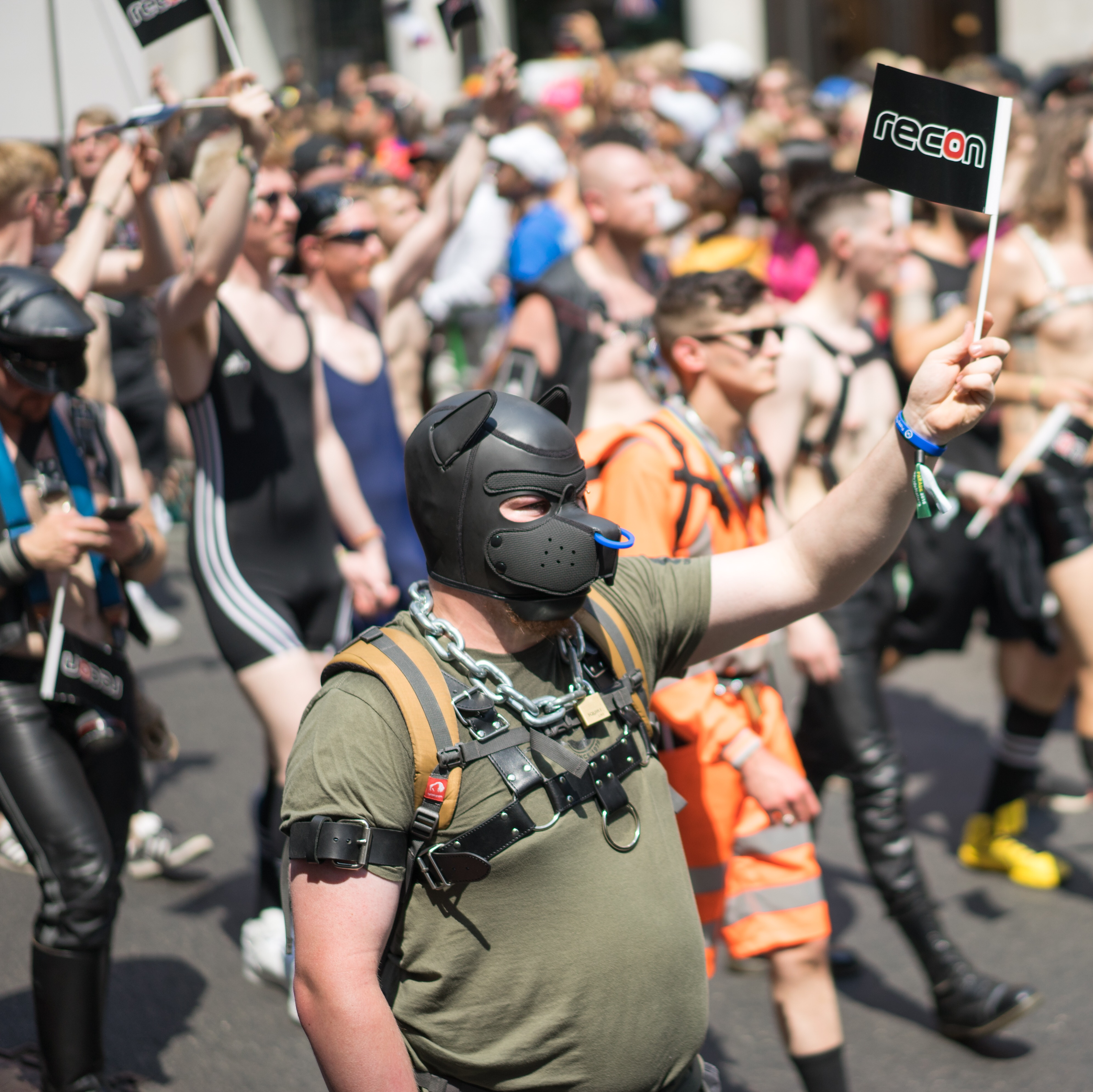
A person wearing a bondage puppy hood at London Pride 2018

Fur fetishism refers to the sexual fetishism that revolves around people wearing fur, or in certain cases, to the garments themselves.

These materials may be fetishised because the garment acts as a fetishistic surrogate or second skin for the wearer's own skin. The material may be regarded as providing a superstimulus that is more intense than the normal response associated with real skin. This is heightened by the fact that the fur was originally an animal's skin and hair.

The most famous, and one of the earliest, depictions of the topic was the semi-autobiographical novel Venus in Furs (1870) by Leopold von Sacher-Masoch. After the novel's success, Sacher-Masoch apparently decided to take on a fetish sadomasochism-lifestyle. In 1884, he had sent a copy of the novel to Richard von Krafft-Ebing, who gave Sacher-Masoch immortality when, in 1891, he coined the term masochism.

=== Wool, Cashmere, Angora ===
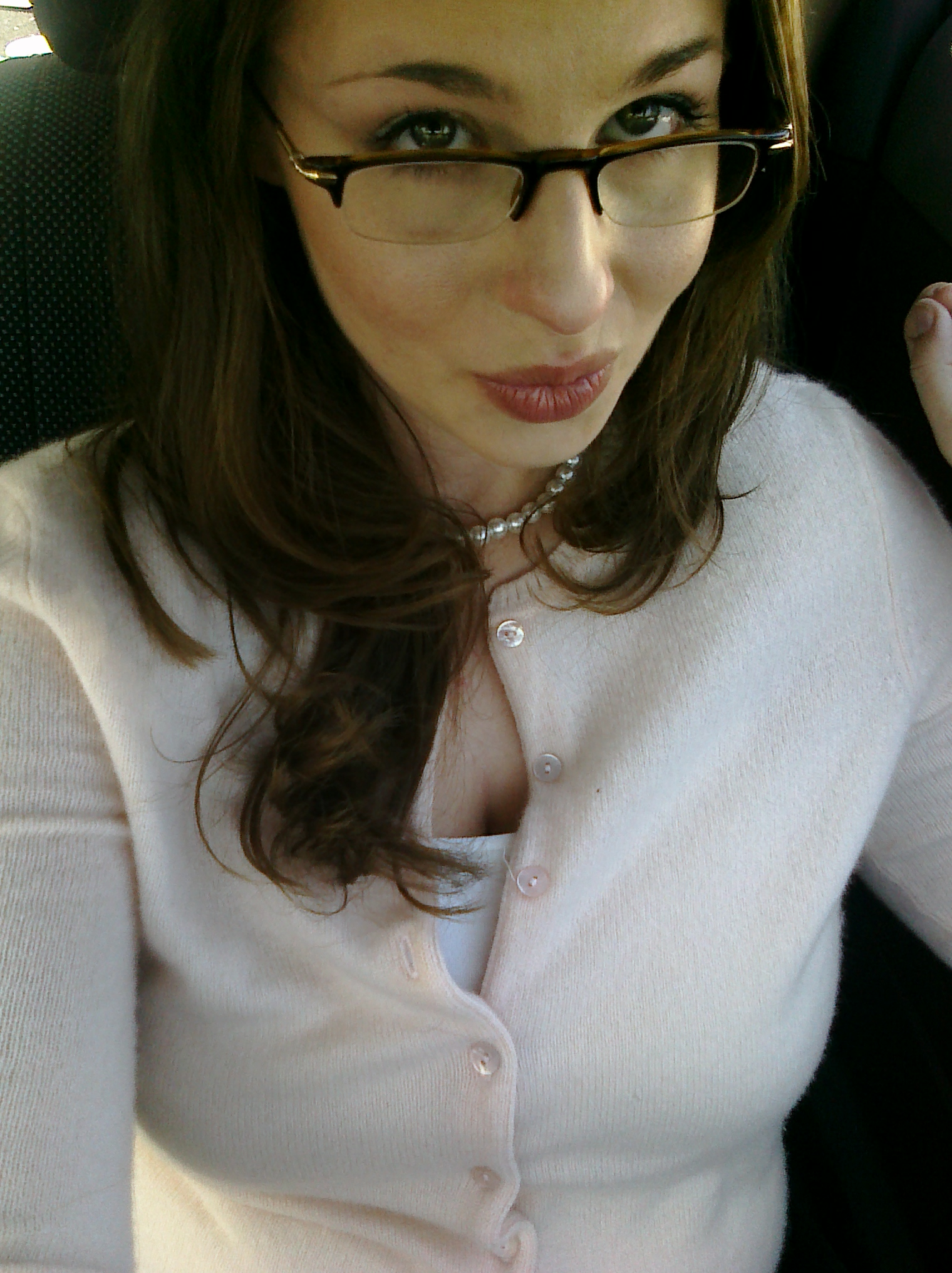
A classic cashmere cardigan look

Sweater fetish is a common name for finding attraction to soft feminine garments such as cardigans, twinsets jumpers/sweaters, dresses, jumpsuits made of soft natural fibres in particular lambswool, mohair, angora, and cashmere.

=== Leather ===
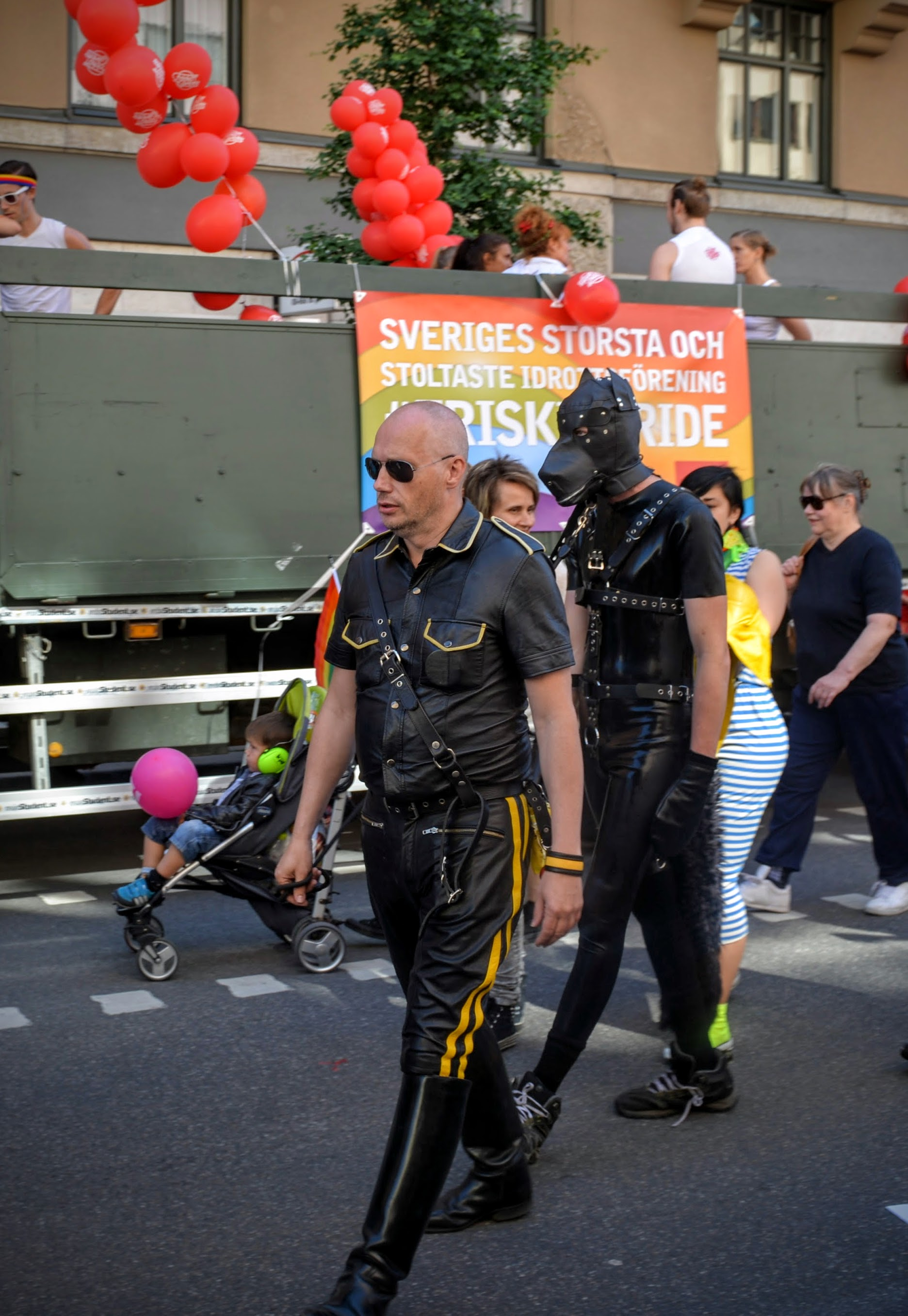
Leather fetish clothing

Leather fetishism is the name popularly used to describe a sexual attraction to people wearing leather and or to the garments themselves. The smell and the sound of leather is often an erotic stimulus for people with a leather fetish. Leather uniforms may also become a fetish. Leather is occasionally finished with a glossy surface and produced in bright colors, providing visual stimuli for some leather fetishists.

The feel of tight leather garments worn may be experienced as a form of sexual bondage. Some bondage equipment is made from leather straps. The term "leather culture" was applied in the 1960s in the American gay sadomasochistic subculture as an umbrella term for alternative sexual practices. The pony fetish involves the use of equestrian like gear fitted to humans.

=== Latex/PVC ===
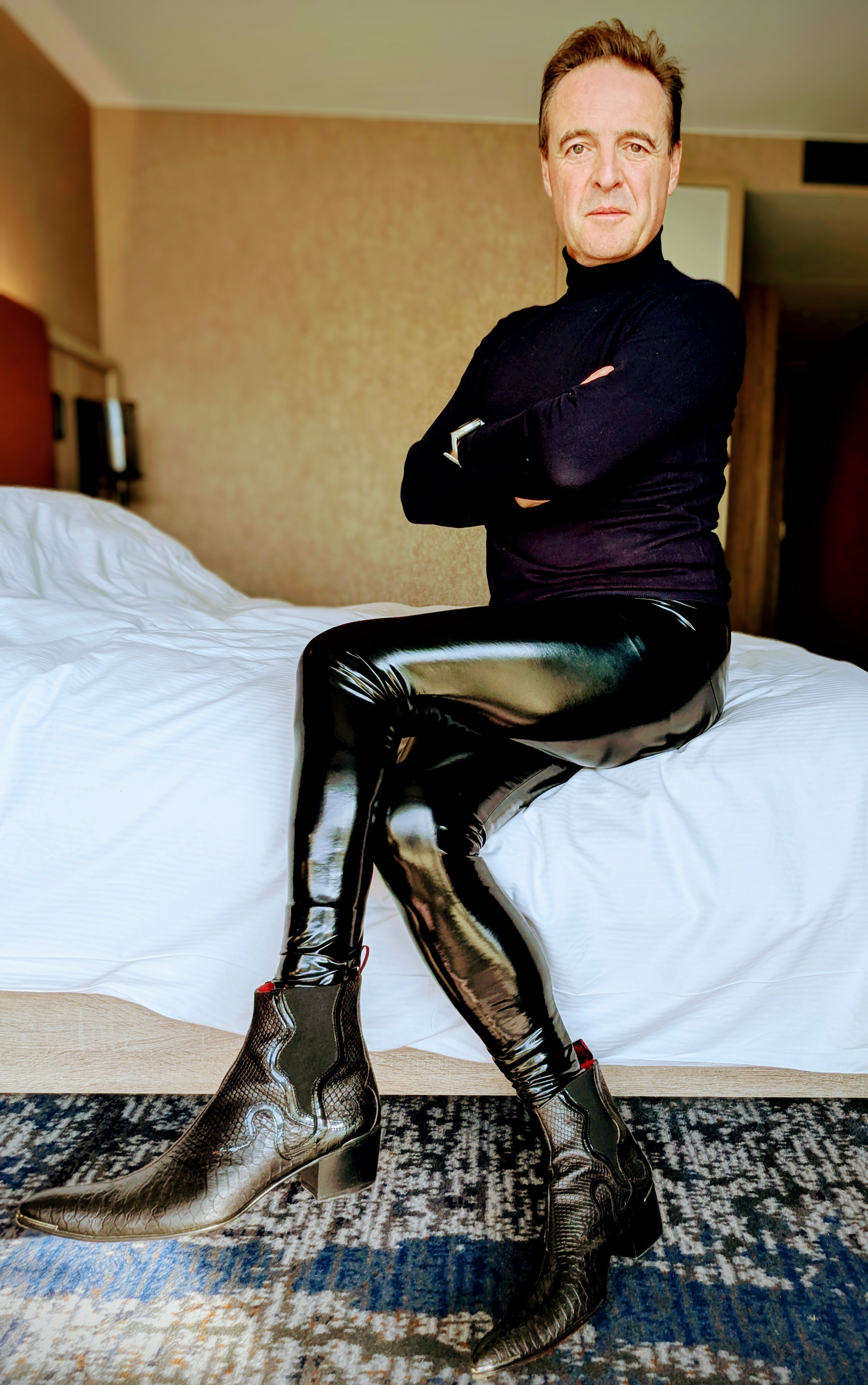
British historian Guy Walters wearing black PVC leggings

Latex fetish is the fetishistic attraction to latex clothing or garments and sometimes called rubber fetishism as latex is a type of rubber. Latex or rubber fetishists may refer to themselves as "Rubberists". Varieties of latex fetishism include body inflation and attraction to transparent rubber. Latex fetishism includes wearing clothing made from latex, observing it worn by others, and enjoyment of erotic fantasies featuring latex garments, catsuits, hoods, divers or industrial protective clothing. A common latex fetish icon is the dominatrix wearing a skin-tight glossy black latex or PVC catsuit.

PVC fetishism is often closely associated with latex fetishism even though the two materials are very different. PVC fetishism involves an erotic attraction to shiny plastic clothes made from polyvinyl chloride (PVC), polyurethane or similar man made materials. PVC may be mistaken for shiny patent leather. PVC fetishism also includes an erotic attraction to clothing such as clear plastic raincoats, slipcovers, custom clothing made out of clear PVC or inflatable items.

Nylon fetishism includes the wearing of shiny raincoats, jackets and trousers. In the case of heterosexuals, special preferences often include nylon clothing items designed for or belonging to the other sex.

=== Spandex ===
Spandex fetishism is a fetishistic attraction to people wearing stretch fabrics or, in certain cases, to the garments themselves, such as leotards. One reason why spandex and other tight fabrics may be fetishised is that the garment forms a "second skin," acting as a fetishistic surrogate for the wearer's own skin. Wearers of skin-tight nylon and cotton spandex garments can appear naked or coated in a shiny or matte substance like paint. The tightness of the garments may also be seen as sexual bondage. Another reason is that nylon-spandex fabric (preferred by many spandex fetishists) is often produced with a very smooth and silk-like finish, which lends a tactile dimension to the fetish – as well as a visual one. There is a sexual attraction to leotards and other dance related clothing. This also goes for gymnasts too.

In comic books, superheroes, superheroines, and supervillains are generally depicted as wearing costumes made of spandex or a similar material. The superheroines always wear skin-tight, very flashy and bright-coloured costumes that usually cover only just enough of the body to be presentable. Fantasies involving superheroes or the wearing of superhero costumes are commonly associated with spandex fetishism.

Full-body suits called zentai entirely immerse the wearer in skin-tight fabric. The suits are essentially catsuits with gloves, feet, and a hood. The wearer experiences total enclosure and those who enjoy erotic objectification might make use of the garment's anonymizing aspect. The word zentai means whole body in Japanese.

== See also ==
- Black leather
- Boot fetishism
- Cosplay
- Coulrophilia
- Fetish fashion
- Fetish magazine
- Glove fetishism
- Hentai
- PVC clothing
- Tightlacing fetishism
- Underwear fetishism

== Sources ==
- de Silva WP (1999). "ABC of sexual health. Sexual variations". BMJ. 318 (7184): 654–6. doi:10.1136/bmj.318.7184.654. PMC 1115095. PMID 10066212.
- Dr. Trimmer, Eric J. The Visual Dictionary of Sex, ISBN 0-89479-011-0; A & W Publishers, 1977
- Kunzle, David (2004). Fashion and Fetishism. Sutton. ISBN 0-7509-3808-0
- Mario Perniola (2004). The Sex Appeal of the Inorganic. Continuum, New York-London. ISBN 978-0-8264-6245-9
