= Paraphilic infantilism =

Role-playing of an infant-like state

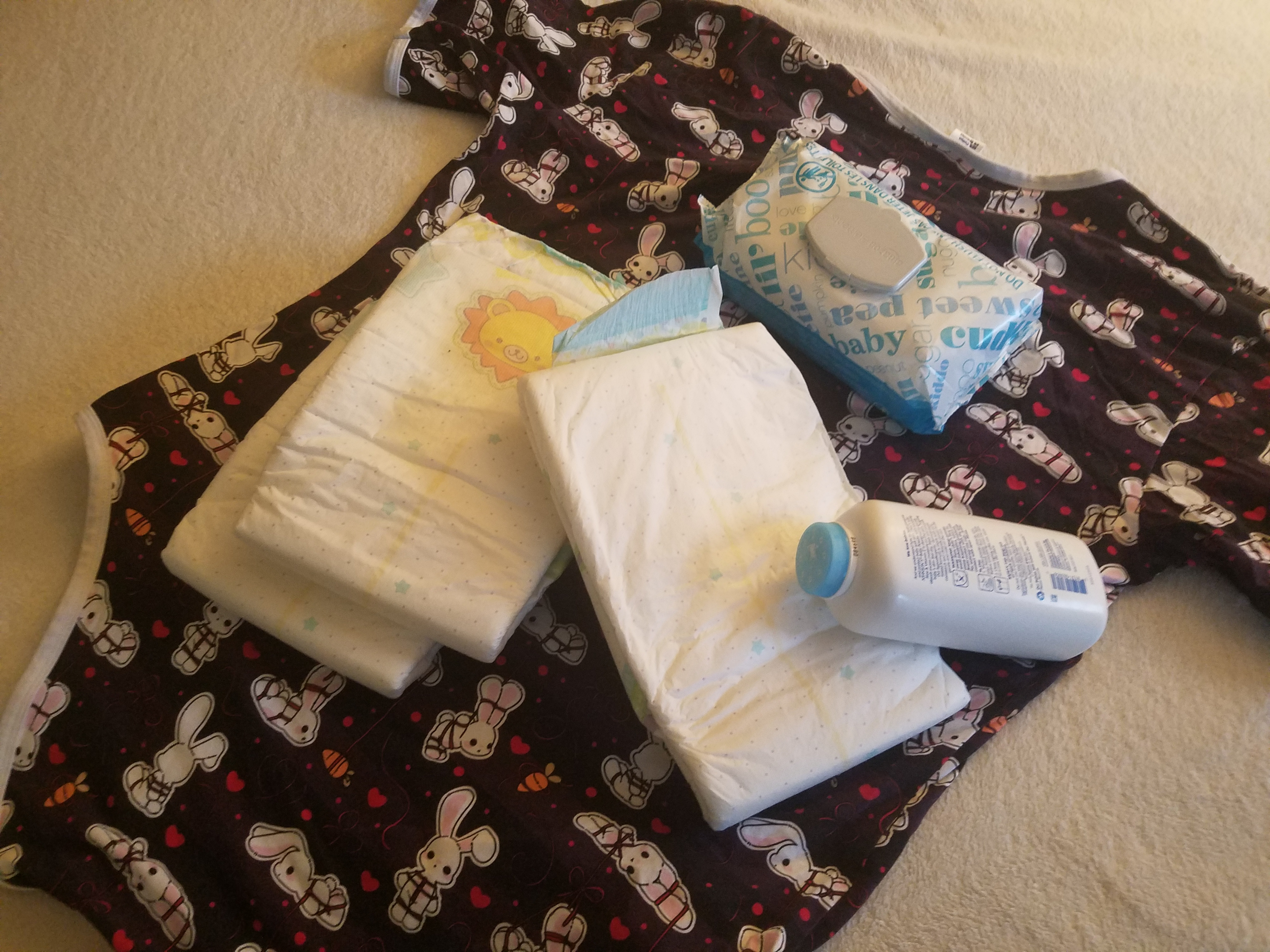
Various accessories associated with ABDL role-play, including decorated adult diapers (ABU "Little Kings", left), wet wipes (top), baby powder (right) and a patterned, adult-sized onesie (ODU "Rope Bunny", underneath)

Paraphilic infantilism, also known as adult baby (or "AB", for short), is a form of ageplay that involves role-playing a regression to an infant-like state. Like other forms of adult play, depending on the context and desires of the people involved, paraphilic infantilism may be expressed as a non-sexual fetish, kink, or simply as a comforting platonic activity. People who practice adult baby play are often colloquially referred to (by themselves and others) as "adult babies", or "ABs".

Behaviors vary, but may include things such as wearing and using diapers, drinking from a baby bottle or sucking on a pacifier, and (when done with others) engaging in gentle, nostalgic and nurturing experiences, baby talk, or BDSM power dynamics involving masochism, coercion, punishment or humiliation.

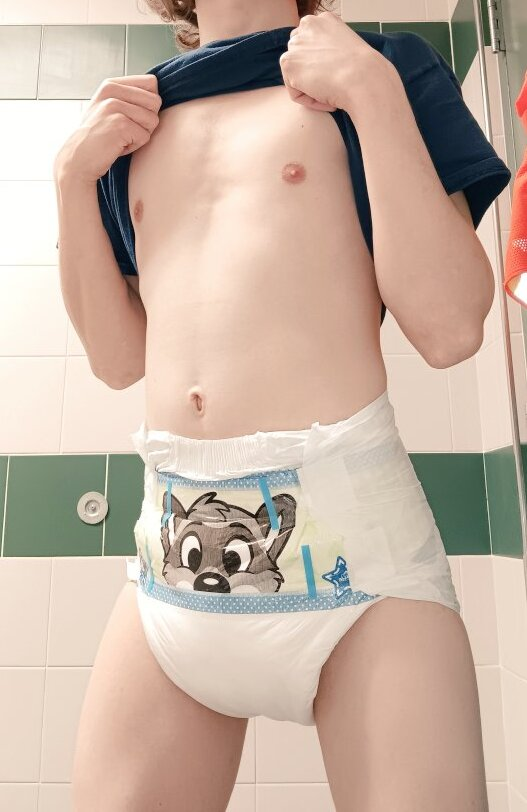
A man wearing an ABDL-oriented adult diaper

Paraphilic infantilism is often associated with diaper fetishism, a separate but related activity in which people derive pleasure or ecstasy from themselves or others wearing or using diapers, but without necessarily involving any form of ageplay. People with a diaper fetish are often informally called "diaper lovers", or "DLs". In practice, however, these strict labels do not always reflect the true diversity of expression. As such, when considered together, paraphilic infantilism and diaper fetishism form a spectrum of behaviors that are often colloquially referred to under the umbrella term "adult baby/diaper lover", or "AB/DL" (more commonly written "ABDL").

Like other sexual fetishes (paraphilias), there is no single recognized psychological origin for paraphilic infantilism and very little research has been done on the subject as of yet. A variety of theories have been proposed for fetish development in general, including unique lovemaps, imprinting or altered erotic targets, though no scientific consensus has emerged. Though it varies from person to person, paraphilic infantilism may sometimes be linked to masochism, urolagnia, garment fetishes, coprophilia, or other consensual kinks and fetishes.

== Characteristics and practices ==
Paraphilic infantilists (usually colloquially called "adult babies" or "ABDLs") are people who derive sexual pleasure and/or emotional comfort from imagining themselves as, and pretending to be, children. It is a specific form of ageplay and, more broadly, sexual role-play, that can be practiced alone or with consenting adult partners. As a paraphilia (a fetish or kink), paraphilic infantilism may represent an atypical sexual interest but is not usually associated with any psychological disorder or poor mental health, and adult baby play can be considered a conscious and valid act of sexual expression. In addition, some people participate in adult baby play purely for the positive feeling and emotional comfort associated with childhood and being cared for; to what degree (if at all) eroticism plays a role depends heavily on the participants and context.

Whether performed solo or with others, one large part of paraphilic infantilism can be dressing in childlike clothing (diapers, onesies, plastic pants, bibs, etc.) and using related accessories and items (pacifiers, nursery-style furniture, etc.) along with other behaviors, such as eating while sitting in a highchair, sleeping in a crib, drinking from a baby bottle or sippy cup, or eating off of children's tableware. As such, depending on the person, it may or may not be associated with a variety of garment and object fetishes, like diaper fetishism.

Another large part of adult baby expression can be behaving like an infant or toddler and engaging in activities such as crawling, sitting on the floor and playing with toys or games, coloring in children's coloring books and activity books, consuming food or drinks associated with childhood (juiceboxes, chicken nuggets, gummy candies, etc.), breastfeeding, using ("wetting" or "soiling") diapers or other clothes and being changed, taking naps, engaging in baby talk, etc.

=== Relationship dynamics ===
When engaging in paraphilic infantilism with partners, various dynamics are possible and participants may take up a variety of different roles, including one or more participants acting as "littles" (adult age players), while others may function as "caregivers" (or "CGs") or "switches" (people whose role may change during or between scenes). This relatively common dynamic is generally referred to as "caregiver/little", or "CG/L".

After consent, rules and play roles are established, the interaction between the little and their partner(s) can take on different forms depending on the desires of the people involved and the nature of the scene. During more nurturing scenes, the little may be cared for or comforted by their caregiver (for example, being cuddled, fed, having their diapers changed, etc.) In this case, the adult baby may want only gentle or comforting treatment, based on the desire to be cared for or to "surrender the responsibilities of adult life". In other types scenes, the presence of BDSM dynamics might involve being talked down to, being denied adult treatment, activities or facilities (for example, toileting restrictions), as well as being scolded, spanked or chastised for misbehaving, acting out, having wet or soiled their diapers, etc. In this latter instance, the mode of arousal is at least partially masochistic.

Potential participants may prefer one specific type of scene over others, or they might enjoy taking part in various different types of scenes.

=== Sexuality ===
Adult baby play may also involve masturbation or sexual intercourse between consenting adult partners. However, other participants may choose not to engage in sexual activity during adult baby play, either because it detracts from their ability to roleplay being in a baby-like state, or because their interest in paraphilic infantilism is non-sexual and motivated by feelings of comfort or being cared for.

Like many other fetishes, the erotic pleasure derived solely from paraphilic infantilism may partially or completely replace the need for conventional sex in reaching orgasm, though it depends on the individual and their level of sexual interest.

== Prevalence ==
Meaningful information on the incidence or prevalence of any paraphilias is lacking due to the private (and often taboo) nature of such practices. Similarly, it has been observed that adult baby play is often a closeted activity and it is not yet well documented in medical literature.

In one study of ABDL website participants, 93% of the sample was male (assigned male at birth, excluding transgender individuals). 58% of the men and 34% of the women were heterosexual. Males on average first became interested in ABDL at age 11, and started practicing it at the age of 13, compared to the ages of 12 and 16 for females, respectively. The most frequent activities were wearing diapers, wetting, and using other baby items. 87% of the men and 91% of the women reported that their ABDL had not caused any significant problems or distress.

It also reported that 9% of Yahoo groups devoted to fetishes dealt with paraphilic infantilism, which was high in relation to other fetishes. The same study, however, noted that males became interested in paraphilic infantilism earlier than females, at age 11 rather than 12, and also began to act on their interests earlier, at 13 rather than 16. It also found that while most males interested in paraphilic infantilism were primarily heterosexual (58%), most females were primarily bisexual (43%). 34% of women were primarily heterosexual. Although both men and women varied in terms of education, only 66% of men and 39% of women earned more than $25,000 a year (equivalent to $34,000 currently).

Because atypical sexual behaviors which do not cause functional impairment, personal distress, danger to others, or have legal implications are generally not considered to be unhealthy or have psychiatric significance, people who practice closeted fetish activities like paraphilic infantilism are often not under the purview of psychiatric awareness and knowledge. Likewise, many people who engage in paraphilic activity do not consider themselves as suffering from a medical condition and do not feel a need or lasting desire to change their behavior. Individuals who practice paraphilic infantilism may only seek therapy for other unrelated issues or, if discovered by others, be encouraged or coerced to seek treatment pertaining directly to the paraphilia itself. This, however, makes it difficult to know the exact prevalence and distribution of kinks among the general population, thus highlighting the potential of anonymous internet surveys for data collection on the ABDL community.

== Relation to other behaviors ==
Infantilism is a diffuse phenomenon and different authorities have taken varied approaches to the question of its medical and sexological classification.

=== With diaper fetishism ===
Strictly speaking, people with a diaper fetish may be aroused by the idea of wearing diapers as an adult, and may not participate in any form of ageplay. Practically speaking, there can be a great deal of variation and overlap between paraphilic infantilisms and diaper fetishists, and the term "ABDL" can be used as a catch-all term which includes a broad spectrum of related kinks and behaviors. As diapers are a commonly used prop for "adult baby" role-play, diaper fetishism may be considered a potential component of paraphilic infantilism.

Sexologist John Money distinguished between paraphilic infantilism (or autonepiophilia) and paraphilic diaper-wearing, stating that the latter is a paraphilic fetish that manifests as an erotic attraction to an article of clothing while the former is a non-fetishistic paraphilia directed at a change of status in terms of age identity.

=== With BDSM ===
In some cases, paraphilic infantilism can involve elements of BDSM. For example, the pseudo-forced used of childish clothing and/or diapers as a way of establishing a power dynamic of dominance and submission, as well as for scenes involving punishment and humiliation.

The Diagnostic and Statistical Manual of Mental Disorders (DSM) states that along with other behaviors, sexual masochists "[...] may have a desire to be treated as a helpless infant and clothed in diapers ('infantilism')" and this association is repeated by others. Masochism appears to be particularly important for female infantilists.

Psychologists D. Richard Laws and William O'Donohue state that "Although infantilism is classified as a sexual masochism in the DSM-IV and DSM-IV-TR, it is questionable whether the criteria for sexual masochism are always met. For example, if the infantile role playing does not involve feelings of humiliation and suffering, then the diagnosis of sexual masochism would not be appropriate and a diagnosis of infantilism as a paraphilia [not otherwise specified] is warranted." Sexologist John Money, in his book Lovemaps describes paraphilic infantilism as a possible "...adjunctive to masochistic discipline and humiliation." Sexologist William B. Arndt considers paraphilic infantilism to combine forms of fetishism, transvestism and masochism. Wilhelm Stekel considered sado-masochistic practices to be variant behavior arising from psychosexual infantilism.

A potential connection between paraphilic infantilism and sadomasochism has been noted in the Polish publication, Przegląd Seksuologiczny. Research results within the publication indicated that 28% of those paraphilic infantilists surveyed reported an interest in BDSM.

=== With cross-dressing ===
Some adult babies may also engage in cross-dressing by wearing clothes which are stereotypically associated with the opposite gender. This subset of the AB community is typically made up of males dressing in "feminine" styles of clothing. (This specific behavior is often referred to as being a "sissy baby".) People who are attracted to masochistic forms of infantilism may participate in forcible cross-dressing.

=== With furry fandom ===
At the intersection of paraphilic infantilism, diaper fetishism and the furry fandom exist the "babyfur" and "diaperfur" subgenres.

Like others in the furry fandom, "babyfurs" and "diaperfurs" enjoy creating and roleplaying as unique and personalized animal characters, but generally with characters that may be considered younger, exhibit anthropomorphic childlike qualities, wear diapers (potentially under and/or over a fursuit), etc.

=== Versus pedophilia ===
Paraphilic infantilism is not to be confused or conflated with pedophilia, as "adult babies" (adults who engage in paraphilic infantilism) only may be participating in sexual role-play, either by themselves or with consenting adult partners. People with this fetish are not as a rule attracted to children and do not seek them as sexual partners, and paraphilic infantilism is not related to pedophilia or any form of child sexual abuse. Sexologist Gloria Brame states that "...infantilists who recognize and accept their sexuality - and its possible roots in infantile trauma - tend to be acutely protective of real children."

In 1993, sexologists Ray Blanchard and Kurt Freund published and discussed a series of case studies involving paraphilic infantilists and noted a distinction between them and pedophiles. Pedophiles are sexually attracted to children and desire for a child sexual partner. In contrast, paraphilic infantilists merely imagine and role-play themselves as a child (usually by adopting the objects and mannerisms of childhood) to increase the power difference between themselves and their preferred adult sexual partners with whom they acted out masochistic fantasies.

Criminologists Stephen and Ronald Holmes believe that while there is no simple answer to the origins of infantilism, the practices may involve an element of stress reduction similar to that of transvestism. These criminologists state that this paraphilia is not inherently a crime in and of itself, and differ it from child sex abuse.

== Psychology ==
=== Etiology ===
Research on the etiology of paraphilias in general is minimal and as of 2008 had essentially come to a standstill; it is not clear whether the development of paraphilic infantilism shares a common cause with other paraphilias. A 2003 case report by psychiatrists Jennifer Pate and Glen Goddard found little research on the topic.

To date no broad-based scientific studies have been made on the cause, incidence and general impact of paraphilic infantilism on society at large. This may be due to both the rarity of the practice and because few paraphilic infantilists appear to seek professional mental health counseling pertaining directly to the paraphilia. A mental health evaluation of an 80 year old paraphillic infantilist whose paraphilia may have been related to a head injury at the age of six concluded that treatment was unwarranted.

An online survey conducted in 2020 indicated that "adults with interest in ABDL showed the presence of anxious traits and recollections of parental rejection during childhood."

==== Lovemap theory ====
Sexologist John Money developed the theory of a lovemap,

"A developmental representation or template in the mind and in the brain depicting the idealized lover and the idealized program of sexual and erotic activity projected in imagery or actually engaged in".

Money thought that the lovemap was normally fully developed by the age of 8, serving as a kind of sexual template through to the end of one's adult life. Money believed all paraphilias were caused by the formation of abnormal lovemaps during the preadolescent years and that such abnormal lovemaps can be formed by any number of contributing factors or stressors during this developmental period.

==== Imprinting theory ====
It has been hypothesized that, among other possible causes, sexual templates are established by a process akin to imprinting where lack of availability of female genitals during a critical period of development causes the imprinting mechanism to instead associate with the nearest visual or olfactory approximation. In the case of infantilism, the discipline of the mother or wearing diapers may create associations between pain, humiliation and sexuality.

Similarly, authors Zack Cernovsky and Yves Bureau hypothesize that erotic fixation to diapers may parallel a study conducted by Harry Harlow in which he deprived infant monkeys of their natural mothers and gave them an artificial mother made of wire and another made of cloth; the monkeys were more likely to spend more time with the mothers made of cloth.

==== Erotic location target error theory ====
An additional theory is that infantilism is an erotic identity disorder where the erotic fantasy is centered on the self rather than on a sexual partner and results from an erotic targeting location error where the erotic target was children yet becomes inverted. According to this model, proposed by Ray Blanchard and Kurt Freund in 1993, infantilism is a sexual attraction to the idea of the self being a child. However, this theory has also been criticized for being a "slippery slope" which "pathologizes nonstandard sexual expression".

==== Psychodynamic regression theories ====
In psychoanalytic theory, Regression is a defense mechanism involving the reversion of the ego to an earlier stage of psychosexual development, as a reaction to an overwhelming external problem or internal conflict. A study published in 2019 stated a correlation between childhood maltreatment and paraphilic infatilism and related fetishes. The regression theories in the psychodynamic area hypothesise that during sexual activities, individuals may subconsciously regress to an early state of childhood for comfort and pleasure, with some masochistic elements attached to the same.

==== Other theories ====
In the limited number of extant medical case reports some clinicians have attempted to explain the behaviors associated with infantilism in terms of obsessive compulsive disorder, as "a concurrent cluster of symptoms found in a variety of psychiatric disorders." Psychiatrist Jay Feierman considers infantilism a form of chronophilia in which the infantilist desires a sexual partner of the same biological age, but their own "sexuoerotic age" does not match his or her own biological age (i.e. the adult infantilist wishes an adult sexual partner who treats them as a baby). A 2011 letter to the editor in the Archives of Sexual Behavior reviewed several case studies and noted a common history of sexual abuse.

== History ==
The first public event for adult babies was "Baby Week", occurring in San Francisco in the early 1990s. Subsequently, the internet became a major forum, with numerous websites offering books, magazines, audio and video tapes and related paraphernalia, as well as a 24-hour hotline. Paraphilic infantilism has appeared as an alternative lifestyle in numerous Western countries including the United States, England, Germany and Australia.

The organization "Diaper Pail Friends" was established in San Francisco, growing to approximately 3,000 members in 1995 through magazine articles, books, talk shows and the Internet. The organization was studied in 1995 by a group of sexologists, though the results were not published. In 2001, the New York organization "Still in Diapers" was founded for diaper fetishists. In 2008, the Diaper Pail Friends had expanded to a national organization and claimed a membership of 15,000.

In 2016, Tykables opened the first wholly dedicated paraphilic infantilism physical retail store in Mount Prospect, Illinois, with controversy from the local community. The store owner believes it helps to break the stigma about the community.

=== Historical terminology and definitions ===
The original definition of "infantilism" meant the persistence of childlike traits in adults and, medically, the failure of an adult to attain sexual maturity. While "sexual infantilism" has also been used medically as a synonym for delayed puberty.

Similarly, the term "psychosexual infantilism" was first used in Sigmund Freud's theory of psychosexual development to refer to individuals who had not matured through his hypothesized stages.

Psychologist Wilhelm Stekel later used the term "psychosexual infantilism" as a category (similar to how paraphilia is used today), which would have included paraphilic infantilism and other fetishes, as well as sexual orientations.

Sexologist John Money initially coined the term "nepiophilia" to describe the attraction to diaper-wearing babies. "Nepon" is Greek for infant. In 1984, Money coined another different term, "autonepiophilia" to describe "diaperism" (diaper fetishism) or the desire of an individual to themselves "become" or act as a baby, without having any attraction to actual infants.

In 2003, Jennifer Pate and Glen Gabbard coined the term "adult baby syndrome" (inspired by an episode of the fictional medical television drama ER) to describe an extreme case of infantilism, which would have been on the level of what is currently considered a "paraphilic disorder" as defined by the DSM-5.

Today, the term "paraphilic infantilism" can be considered a academic term for the fetish, while the more common term "adult baby" is used colloquially. Another term, "ABDL" (also written "AB/DL"), is often used as a broad, non-specific, and inclusive shorthand for the wider community of people who engage in "adult baby" play, diaper play, or various other associated interests, both sexual and platonic in nature. The exact origins of the nicknames "adult baby" and "ABDL" are difficult to determine, but there is evidence to suggest that these names have been in kink community for decades.

== See also ==
- Sexual roleplay
- Ageplay
- BDSM
- Diaper fetishism
- Erotic lactation
