= Diaper fetishism =

Sexual fetish in which a person feels a desire to wear or use diapers

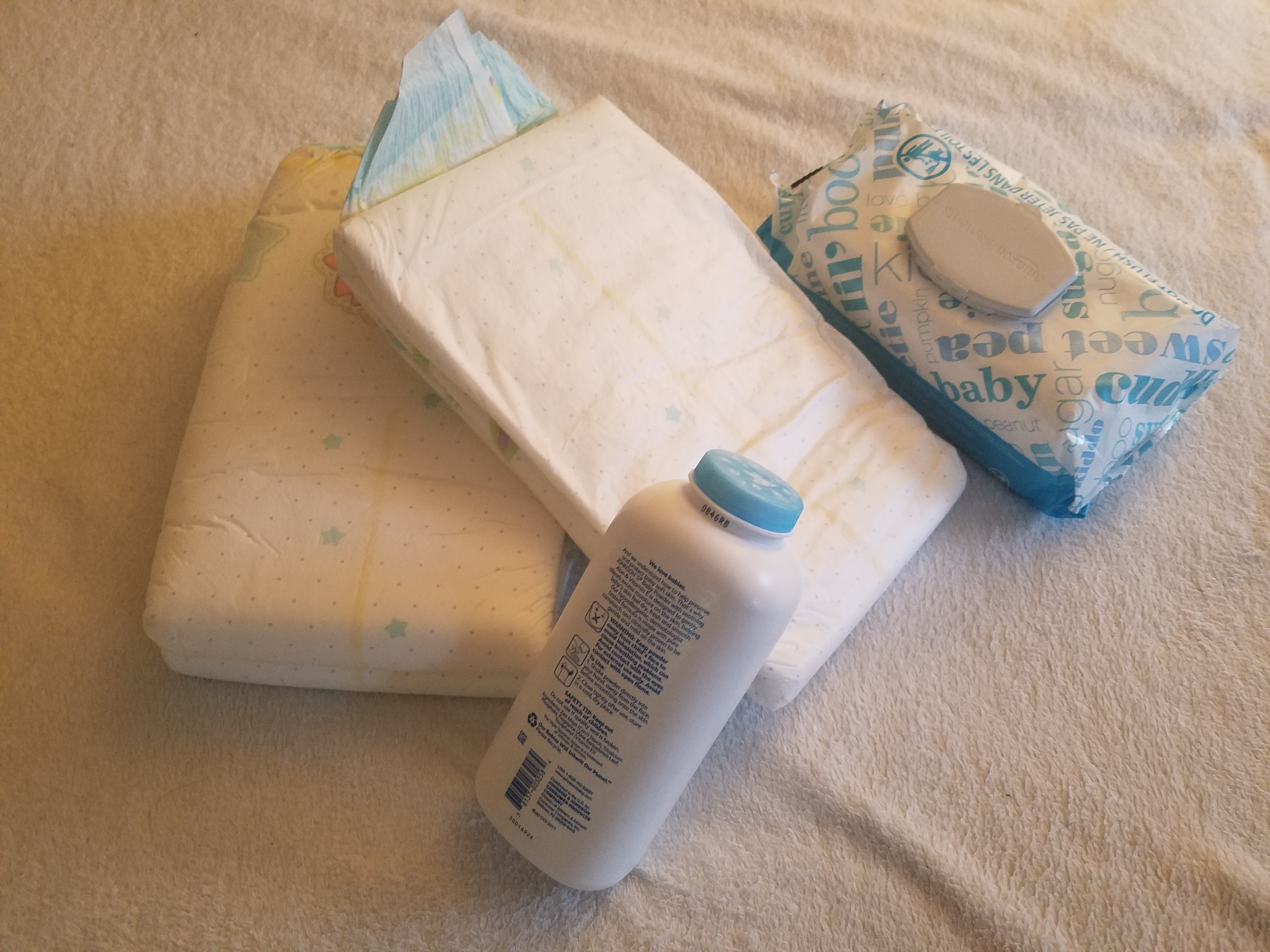
Various accessories associated with diaper fetishism and ABDL role-play; including decorated adult diapers (left), wet wipes (right) and baby powder (bottom).

Diaper fetishism (American English), or rarely nappy fetishism (British English), is a type of garment fetish in which a person derives pleasure from themselves or partners wearing or using a diaper.

Diaper fetishism can be performed on its own or incorporated into various other kinks, such as ageplay, urolagnia, omorashi, BDSM, furry, etc.

While diaper fetishism is objectively distinct from paraphilic infantilism, they are closely related to each other, with significant enough overlap between the concepts and communities to have given rise to the shared label of "adult baby/diaper lover", or "ABDL" for short.

== Behavior and attraction ==
Generally speaking, people who choose to wear diapers for recreational purposes (as opposed to medical need or situational convenience) may informally classify themselves as "diaper lovers" (DLs), yet vary widely in their motivation, interest and focus of attention.

While some use diapers to achieve or enhance sexual pleasure as part of a kink or fetish, others find diapers to be a source of non-sexual positive feelings, such as comfort, relaxation, nostalgia, as well as being loved or cared for. This is not a dichotomy, however, as many DLs experience both sexual and non-sexual gratification. (Strictly speaking, the term "diaper fetishism" may only apply to those who derive at least some degree of sexual arousal from the activity.) In other words, there is no singular or archetypal behavior and a wide range of thought patterns and activities exist, but all tend to be harmless forms of self-expression.

Whether motivated mainly by sexual pleasure or feelings of comfort, many DLs find wearing diapers to be an intense multisensory experience in which touch (the soft, bulky or squishy feeling of wearing a diaper), sight (seeing themselves or another adult in a diaper), sound (the crinkle of the material), and in some cases smell (baby powder, wet wipes, urine or feces) are all stimulated. For some people with a diaper fetish, any one of these sensations may be enough stimulus to derive some level of erotic pleasure or sexual arousal, and may or may not represent a connection or overlap with other paraphilias.

While some DLs prefer to simply wear diapers without using them at all, others may experience increased arousal from "wetting" and/or "messing" in their diapers. Others still may prefer to "simulate" the feeling of a used diaper by saturating the polymer gel core with water, other liquids, blood, semen, or soft solids. Additionally, some people may choose to primarily stick within their particular comfort zone, while others may feel the occasional desire to explore or experiment with various types of play.

Like many other forms of sexual expression, diaper play can be performed either solo or with one or more consenting partners. Further, while some participants only wear diapers in certain private settings or for limited amounts of time, others might endeavor to "go 24/7" by wearing diapers under their clothes during the course of their daily lives and for a longer period of time. Crucially, because most in the broader ABDL community subscribe to the notion of "safe, sane and consensual" expression of their kink, exposing others to unwanted sights or smells is highly frowned upon and most intentionally explore their fantasies in a way that would likely not be visible to or noticed by passersby on the street.

== Diapers in other fetishes ==
=== Ageplay ===
Diaper lovers (DLs), including those with a diaper fetish, are often associated with adult babies (ABs) and referred to under the umbrella term, "ABDL" (less commonly written "AB/DL").

While both may wear diapers for sexual arousal and positive feelings, a DL is someone whose interest lies mainly in the diaper itself, while an AB will use the diaper mainly as an element of ageplay; a prop which helps the person roleplay and imagine themselves as a child. In practice, however, ABDL represents an entire spectrum of interests and behaviors, with some who might classify themselves as DLs being open to some degree of ageplay, and some who might classify themselves as ABs (or maybe "littles" or "middles", depending on their age roleplaying preference) being only marginally interested in diapers.

Over time, as ageplay in general has become more popular, better understood, and less stigmatized, an entire industry has developed around the production of goods for the community. Today, a wide variety of adult diapers (including cloth diapers and disposables with elaborate and colorful designs), cute or childish clothing in adult sizes, and other ageplay accessories are sold to members of the ABDL community around the world. Furthermore, ABDL products are becoming increasingly available at sex shops and even mainstream online retailers.

Finally, though less common, diapers may also be used as a prop during ageplay scenes in which a participant is playing as an older adult.

=== BDSM ===
Diapers can also play a part in a variety of BDSM scenes, whether as a passive convenience during long bondage sessions where the bound participant may not be able to express or act upon their need to visit a toilet, or as an active element and focal point during a scene involving power dynamics like movement modification, bathroom restriction, diaper punishment, or humiliation.

Another dynamic that blends BDSM with ageplay is called "caregiver/little" (CG/L), in which one participant takes on the role of a caregiver (CG) or parental figure (often called "daddy", "mommy", etc.), and another participant takes on the childlike role of a "little". In some variations of this dynamic, CG/L can overlap significantly with ABDL play, and diapers may be used.

=== Rubber fetishism ===
Some rubber and plastic fetishists have an affinity for diapers and rubber pants. In the case of disposable diapers, this attraction would be to their crinkly plastic backing. In the case of cloth diapers, it would be towards the latex or PVC of the pants worn over them.

== Fetish diapers ==
Over time, many companies that make and sell adult diapers have begun to take notice of the fetish audience, creating new diapers and other products designed to appeal to kink community.

Also commonly called "ABDL diapers", adult diapers that primarily target the kink community often have increased absorbency as well as vibrant, cute or playful designs. While diapers marketed towards people with incontinence increasingly opt for "pull-up" designs and materials that prioritize discretion and mimic the look and feel of briefs, diapers made for the fetish community are typical "tape/tab" style and prioritize absorbency, aesthetics, feel, sound, eroticism and nostalgia. ABDL diapers may also have features like plastic backing material (popular for its distinctive crinkling sound), hook-and-loop tapes (allowing for improved fit and multiple adjustments), external wetness indicators, added scents, etc.

Though less popular than tabbed disposable diapers, adult cloth diapers, diaper covers and training pants designed and marketed towards the ABDL community also exist.

Finally, while medical diapers can be found at many supermarkets and drug stores, fetish diapers are typically only found online, at kink lifestyle conventions and specialty stores, or in some sex shops.

== Clinical significance ==
Like all kinks, diaper fetishism can be considered an atypical sexual interest, but that alone is neither problematic nor indicative of poor mental health.

In 2013, the American Psychiatric Association (APA) published the Diagnostic and Statistical Manual of Mental Disorders, Fifth Edition (DSM-5) which, among other things, draws a clear distinction between "atypical sexual interests" (otherwise known as kinks, fetishes, or paraphilias) and "paraphilic disorders". The APA states that "most people with atypical sexual interests do not have a mental disorder" and as such, in the vast majority of cases, kinks like diaper fetishism can simply be considered valid and harmless forms of human sexual expression.

However, it is possible for any fetish to become associated with a "paraphilic disorder", in which the behavior or underlying desire causes someone to "feel personal distress about their interest, [and] not merely distress resulting from society's disapproval".

While being forced to wear diapers as a form of humiliation was previously mentioned in the DSM-IV as an expression of sexual masochism, any reference to diaper fetishism has since been removed in the DSM-5 due to the declassification and depathologization of paraphilias (fetishes) in general.

An examination of changes in the DSM-5 discovered that it “distinguishes paraphilias from paraphilic disorders (allowing unusual sexual interests to be studied by researchers but only regarded as disorders when they cause distress or dysfunction)”.

== Cultural views ==
In September 2015, Huffington Post Arts & Culture published an interview on diaper fetishes. While this clothing fetish is obscure, diaper fetishists engage in the behavior privately or with a partner who shares a mutual interest in the fetish (sexual acts).

The South Korean public often views diaper fetishism in a negative light. A Naver cafe (similar to the Yahoo! Groups service) that is devoted to diaper fetishism was closed around September 2010 as the South Korean media outlets portrayed it negatively to the general public. Another incident occurred when a South Korean girl group, Girl's Day, were accused of wearing costumes that looked like oversized diapers, dubbed diaper fashion.

== See also ==
- Clothing fetish § Diapers
- Omorashi
- Paraphilic infantilism (adult baby)
