= Rothwell scale =

Absorbency scale for incontinence products

The Rothwell scale, or Rothwell system, or Rothwell method, applied to incontinence care products, is a scale that shows how absorbent a particular incontinence pad or adult diaper is, and how much liquid it can absorb and hold before it is likely to leak due to overfill.

The system provides a quick reference for assessing how much liquid can be held by a sheet, pad or diaper, and therefore how appropriate it will be for a particular individual in any given circumstance. The scale is based on the total absorbency test ISO 11948–1. The scale runs from 1 to 22, with 1 indicating the least liquid absorbed, measured in grams, and 22 the most liquid absorbed. The scale also applies a prefix to show what type of product is being referred to, with pads and sheets having an “I” prefix, and all in one diapers using a D prefix.

Scale	Absorbency	Scale	Absorbency
I1	0g to 49g	D14	1300g to 1699g
I2	50g to 99g	D15	1700g to 2099g
I3	100g to 199g	D16	2100g to 2499g
I4	200g to 299g	D17	2500g to 2899g
I5	300g to 449g	D18	2900g to 3299g
I6	450g to 599g	D19	3300g to 3699g
I7	600g to 799g	D20	3700g to 4099g
I8	800g to 999g	D21	4100g to 4499g
I9	1000g to 1249g	D22	4500g to 4899g
I10	1250g to 1499g		
I11	1500g to 1799g		
I12	1800g to 2099g		
I13	2100g to 2499g		
I14	2500g to 2899g		
I15	2900g to 3299g		
