= Incontinence pad =

Absorbent undergarment used to manage urinary incontinence

An incontinence pad is a small, impermeable multi-layered sheet with high absorbency that is used in the incontinence and health-care industries as a precaution against urinary incontinence.. They should not be confused with pull or tape on adult diapers that are used for heavier incontinence and bowel incontinence. They are generally made of cotton if washable, or nonwoven fabric paper if disposable. Incontinence pads are placed in an undergarment or on a bed or chair under a person. Incontinence pads are manufactured in light and heavy grades which offer a range of absorbencies, often referred to as a 'working capacity', which refers to the true absorbency an incontinence pad offers when in use. These sorts of pads can come as panty-liners, inserts, or pads.

Chair or bed-based protective pads, known as chair pads or bed pads, may be used to protect pieces of furniture from urine leakage in place of or in addition to pads and other incontinence products. They are usually constructed in layers of quilted absorbent fabric and alternating liquid impermeable plastic or polyurethane. Products containing polyurethane are generally considered better as they provide a waterproof backing, whilst still allowing air to circulate reducing the risk of rashes and sores.

== Healthcare ==
Incontinence pads are often overused in people with dementia. Guidelines suggest that treatment should always be preferred to containment as pads can be uncomfortable and negatively affect the person's dignity. A balanced diet, exercise, hand hygiene, and prompts to go to the toilet should be preferred over using pads. An ethnographic study in the UK pointed out the existence of "pad culture" which means that the main care strategy was the use of continence pads even in cases where people were continent. The main reasons for this strategy were fears about safety and falls which kept people in their beds and did not support independence. This mode of caring often leads to undignified situations and the use of demeaning language.

== See also ==
- Adult diaper
- Rothwell scale
