= Risk-aware consensual kink =

Precept for ethical BDSM play

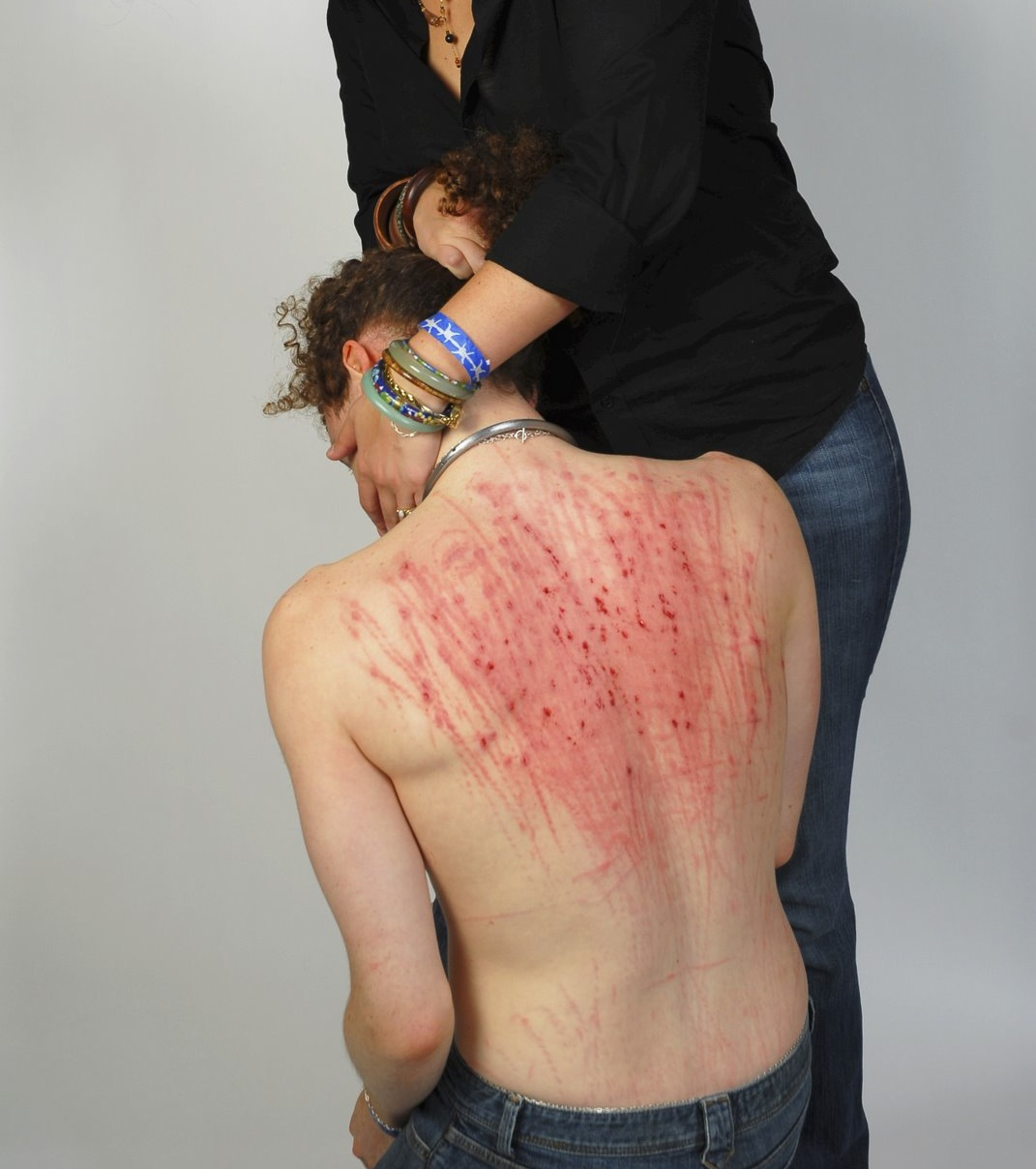
A man in a submissive role is consoled by his mistress after she has made his back bloody through beating.

Risk-aware consensual kink (RACK, also risk-accepted consensual kink) is an acronym used by some of the BDSM community to describe a philosophical view that is generally permissive of certain risky sexual behaviors, as long as the participants are fully aware of the risks. This is often viewed in contrast to safe, sane, and consensual which generally holds that only activities that are considered safe, sane, and consensual are permitted.

== Philosophy ==
The philosophy for RACK consists of the following components:

- Risk-aware: The partners involved are well-informed of the risks involved in the proposed activity.
- Consensual: In light of those risks, both or all partners have, of sound mind, offered preliminary consent to engage in said activity.
- Kink: Said activity can be classified as alternative sex.

While "Safe, sane and consensual" (SSC) attempts to describe and differentiate BDSM from abuse in ways that are easy for the non-BDSM public to comprehend, RACK differs from it in that it acknowledges that nothing is ever 100% inherently safe. By acknowledging that what may be safe or sane to one person may not be considered the same to another, the RACK philosophy tends to be more inclusive of activities that others may consider as edgeplay. There is no "safe" or "not safe" within RACK, only "safer" and "less safe."

== History ==
RACK was coined in reaction to dissatisfaction within the BDSM community regarding SSC. According to David Stein, the man who coined "Safe, Sane, and Consensual S/M" for New York's Gay Male S/M Activists organization, SSC was only intended to be put forward as a minimum standard for ethically defensible S/M play, to establish a distinction between play between loving S/M partners and the public perception of sadomasochism which would be more accurately described as abusive behavior. Over time, as the phrase started spreading through the larger community and appeared on bumper stickers and T-shirts, people started to associate "safe" with "risk-free," diluting the message. "Instead of asking people to think about what it means to do S/M ethically, and to make the hard choices that are sometimes necessary (if only between what's right and what's right now), many organizations today act as if these issues have all been settled, assuring us that sadistic or masochistic behavior not deemed SSC isn't S/M at all but something else — abuse, usually, or domestic violence or poor self-esteem."

In 1999, Gary Switch posted to The Eulenspiegel Society's USENET list "TES-Friends" proposing the term RACK out of a desire to form a more accurate portrayal of the type of play that many engage in. Noting that nothing is truly 100% safe, not even crossing the street, Switch compared BDSM to the sport of mountain climbing. In both, risk is an essential part of the thrill, and that risk is minimized through study, training, technique, and practice.

== Variations ==
Not all members of the BDSM community adhere to one principle to the exclusion of the other.

- Some people subscribe to both mottos, using SSC as a description of the activities to any member of the general public, while using RACK as a description of the activities within members of a community.
- Still others define their own terms, the term PRICK (Personal Responsibility, Informed Consensual Kink) in particular emphasizes the concept of taking personal responsibility for your actions, as well as an informed analysis of the risks.
- In some "old-guard" circles the term "Committed Compassionate Consensual" is circulated.

== See also ==
- BDSM
- Edgeplay
- Erotic asphyxiation
- List of universities with BDSM clubs
- Safe, sane and consensual
