= Functional incontinence =

Type of urinary incontinence caused by lack of access to a toilet

Functional incontinence is a form of urinary incontinence in which a person is usually aware of the need to urinate, but for one or more physical or mental reasons they are unable to get to a bathroom. The loss of urine can vary, from small leakages to full emptying of the bladder.

== Main causes ==
There are a number of causes of functional incontinence. These include confusion, dementia, poor eyesight, impaired mobility or dexterity or unwillingness to use the toilet due to depression or anxiety. Functional incontinence is more common in elderly people as many of the causes are associated with conditions that affect people as they age. For example, a person with Alzheimer's disease may not plan well enough to reach a bathroom in time or may not remember how to get to the bathroom.

== Non-medical causes ==
Functional incontinence can also occur at any age in circumstances where there is no underlying medical problem. For example, a person may recognise the need to urinate but is unable to do so because there is no toilet or suitable alternative nearby or access to a toilet is restricted or prohibited.

If a suitable place to urinate does not become available, the person may reach a stage where they are no longer able to refrain from urination and involuntary voiding of the bladder may take place. Instances of this sort will often result in full emptying of the bladder, but are likely to be one-off or rare occurrences. Excessive alcohol consumption can also cause episodes of incontinence in otherwise healthy adults.
