= Adult diaper =

Diaper made to be worn on a body larger than that of an infant or toddler

An adult diaper (or adult nappy in Australian English, British English, and Hiberno-English) is a diaper made to be worn by a person with a body larger than that of an infant or toddler. Diapers can be necessary for children, adolescents and adults with various conditions, such as incontinence, mobility impairment, severe diarrhea or dementia. Adult diapers are made in various forms, including those resembling traditional child diapers, underpants, and pads resembling sanitary napkins (known as incontinence pads). Superabsorbent polymer is primarily used to absorb bodily wastes and liquids.

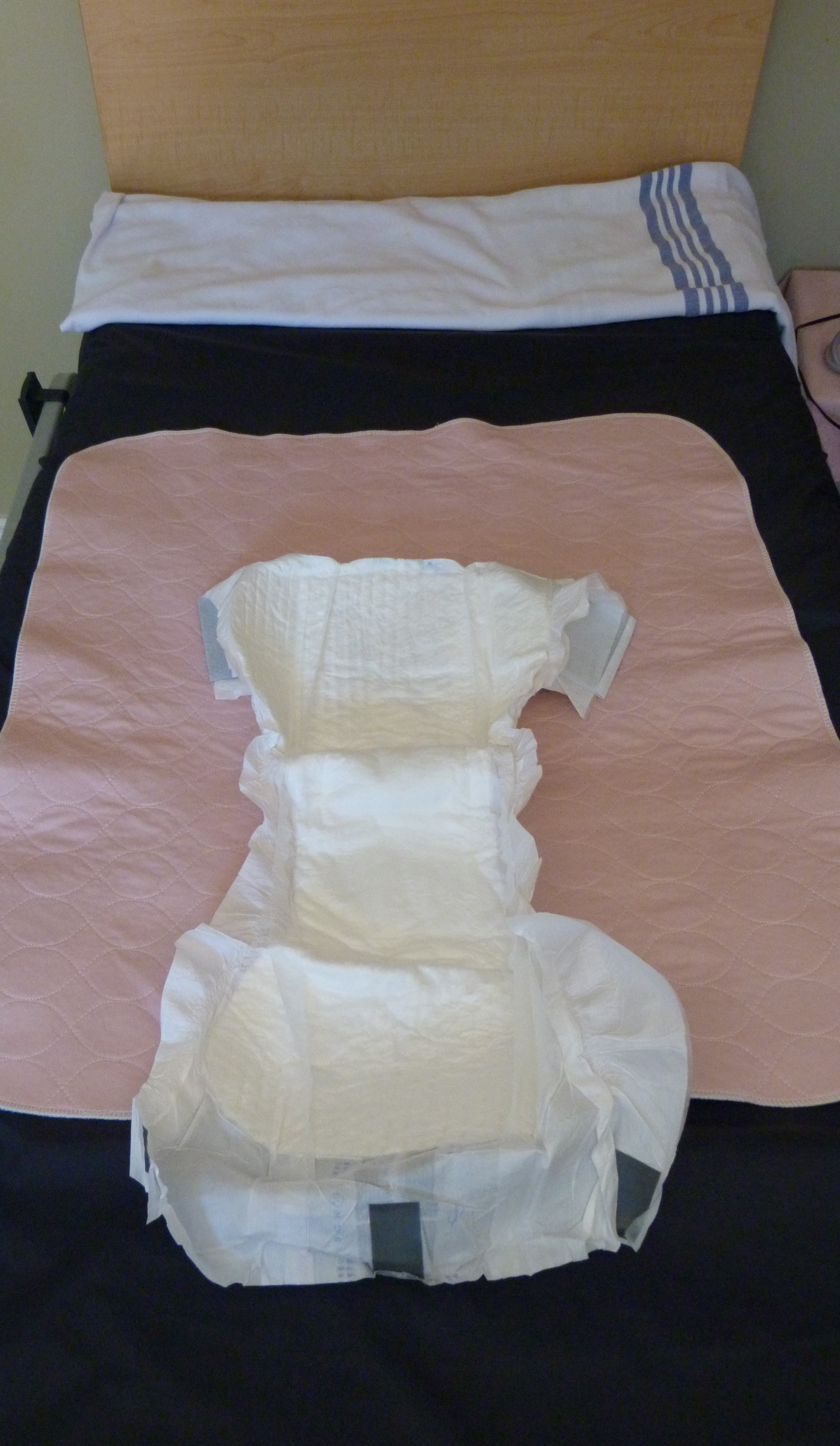
Adult diaper

Alternative terms such as "briefs", "incontinence briefs", or "incontinence products" are also used.

== Market trends ==
The size of the global adult diaper market in 2025 has been estimated by various sources to range between $11 and 22 billion, with the market expected to grow significantly by the 2030s. For example, the US adult diaper market is forecast to grow by 4.9% by 2030 as compared to 2022. Likewise growth by 2030 is in Japan forecast to be 6.8% as compared to 2024. The growth in the EU by 2036 as compared to 2026 is forecast to be 6.7%. The growth of the global market is attributed to an aging population in many countries.

The growth of the market in Japan has inspired adult diaper fashion shows, the first of which was held in 2008 and that still took place in 2025. The trend has now begun expanding to countries such as the US.

== Uses ==
=== Health care ===
"Although donning a diaper to decrease the number of bathroom stops is not something you or I would think to do, otherwise healthy adults do wear diapers more often than we realize for good reasons."

— Merlene Davis of the Lexington Herald-Leader, referring to the Lisa Nowak incident and adult diaper usage in general.

People with medical conditions which cause them to experience urinary or fecal incontinence often require diapers or similar products because they are unable to control their bladders or bowels. People who are bedridden or in wheelchairs, including those with good bowel and bladder control, may also wear diapers because they are unable to access the toilet independently. Those with cognitive impairment, such as dementia, may require diapers because they may not recognize their need to reach a toilet.

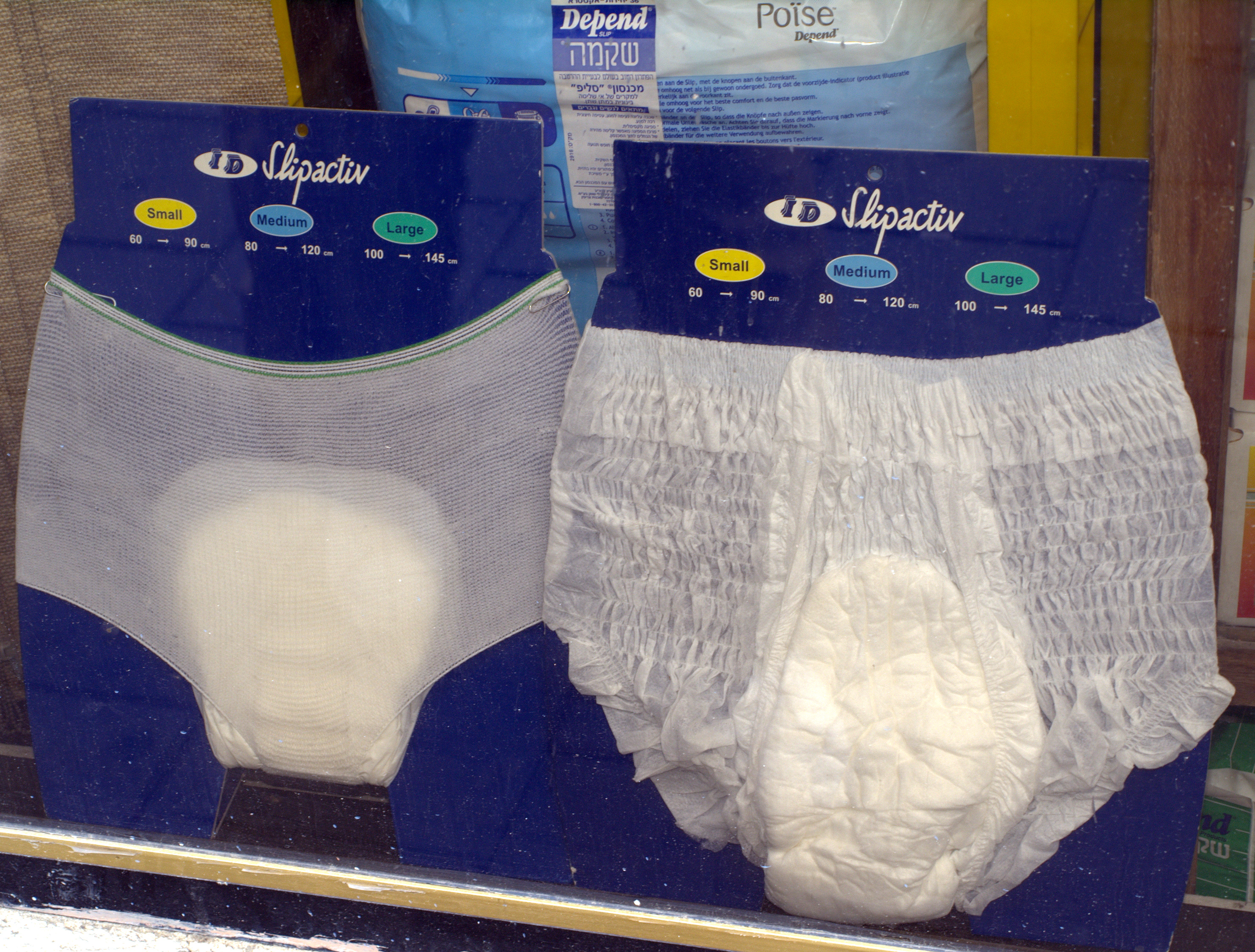
Men's and women's adult diapers in the form of underpants.

Absorbent incontinence products come in a wide range of types (drip collectors, pads, underwear and adult diapers), each with varying capacities and sizes. The largest volume of products that is consumed falls into the lower absorbency range of products, and even when it comes to adult diapers, the cheapest and least absorbent brands are used the most. This is not because people choose to use the cheapest and least absorbent brands, but rather because medical facilities are the largest consumer of adult diapers, and they have requirements to change patients as often as every two hours. As such, they select products that meet their frequent-changing needs, rather than products that could be worn longer or more comfort.

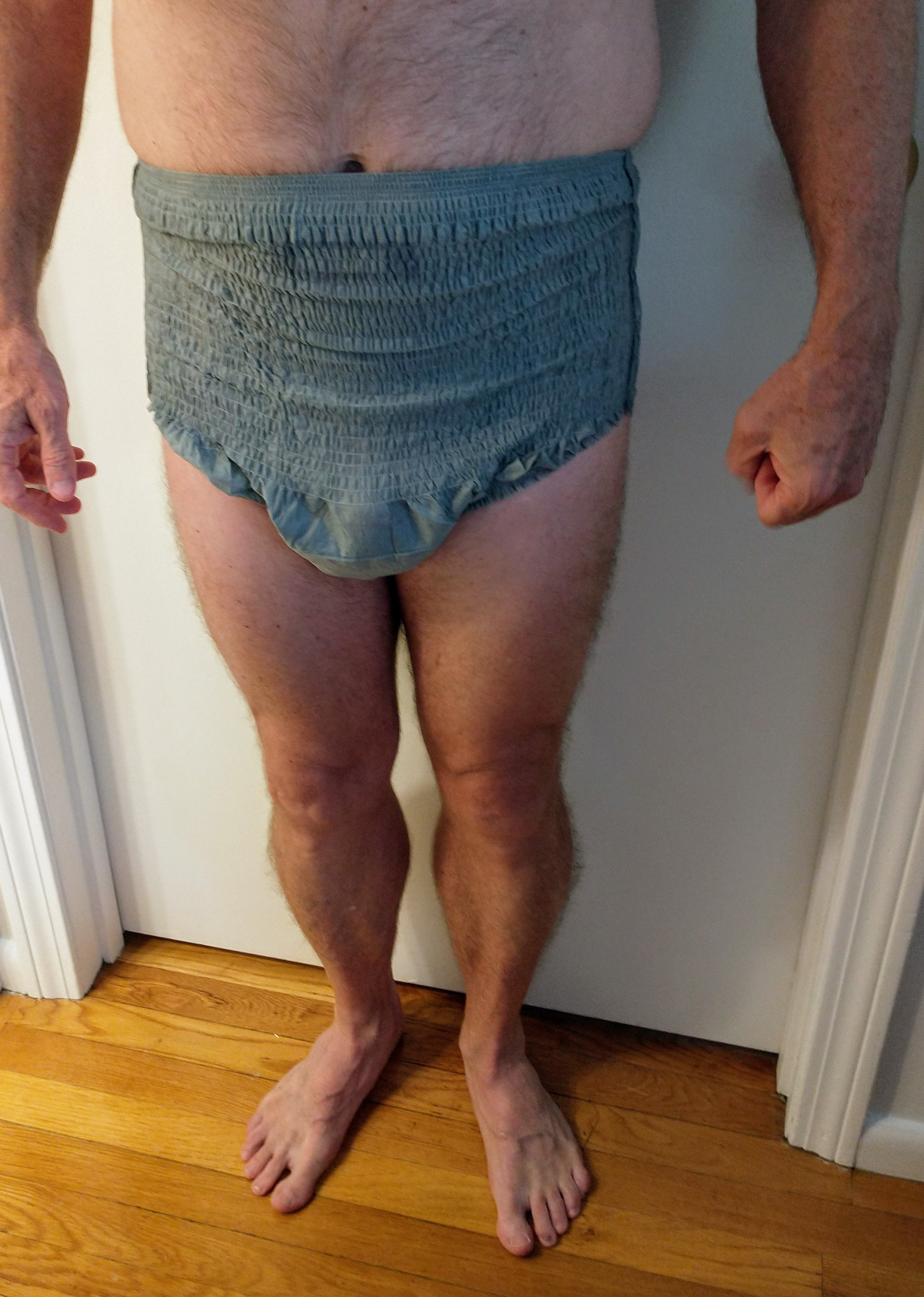
An adult male in a disposable diaper worn backwards (usually there is a way to tell the front from the back of a disposable diaper; in this picture the gray rectangle is on the back of the diaper, meaning it is being worn backwards).

Specialty diapers are required for swimming or pool therapy. These are known as swim diapers or containment swim briefs. They are intended mainly for fecal incontinence, but may sometimes hold minor urine leakage. Manufacturers such as Discovery Trekking, Splash About and Theraquatics commonly utilize a stretch fabric to allow increased adjustability for a snug fit. They are washable and reusable.

=== Astronauts ===
Astronauts wear trunklike diapers called "Maximum Absorbency Garments", or MAGs, during liftoff and landing. On space shuttle missions, each crew member receives three diapers—for launch, reentry and a spare in case reentry has to be waved off and tried later. The super-absorbent fabric used in disposable diapers, which can hold up to 400 times its weight, was developed so Apollo astronauts could stay on spacewalks and extra-vehicular activity for at least six hours. Originally, only female astronauts would wear Maximum Absorbency Garments, as the collection devices used by men were unsuitable for women; however, reports of their comfort and effectiveness eventually convinced men to start wearing the diapers as well. Public awareness of astronaut diapers rose significantly following the arrest of Lisa Nowak, a NASA astronaut charged with attempted murder, who gained notoriety in the media when the police reported she had driven 900 miles, with an adult diaper so she would not have to stop to urinate. The diapers became fodder for many television comedians, as well as being included in an adaptation of the story in Law & Order: Criminal Intent, despite Nowak's denial that she wore them.

=== Fetish and comfort use ===
Adult diapers are also associated with a number of sexual fetishes including diaper fetishism, in which the diaper itself is considered the main object of erotic enhancement, comfort, style, and other positive emotions. Other sexual uses include omorashi and sometimes certain BDSM scenes. Diapers are also a common non-sexual or sexual component of paraphilic infantilism.

=== Other ===
Other situations in which diapers are worn because access to a toilet is unavailable or not allowed for longer than even a normal urinary bladder can hold out include;

- Guards who must stay on duty and are not permitted to leave their posts; this is sometimes called the "watchman's urinal".
- It has long been suggested that legislators don a diaper before an extended filibuster, so often that it has been jokingly called "taking to the diaper."
- Some death row inmates who are about to be executed wear "execution diapers" to collect body fluids expelled during and after their death.
- People diving in diving suits (in former times often standard diving dress) may wear diapers because they are underwater continuously for several hours.
- Similarly, pilots may wear them on long flights.
- In 2003, Hazards magazine reported that workers in various industries were taking to wearing diapers because their bosses denied them toilet breaks during working hours. One woman said that she was having to spend 10% of her pay on incontinence pads for this reason.
- Chinese media reported in 2006 that diapers are a popular way to avoid long queues for the toilets on railway trains during the Lunar New Year traveling season.
- In Germany, younger patients in drunken coma are placed in hospital diapers.
- In 2020, during the COVID-19 pandemic, the Civil Aviation Administration of China recommended that flight attendants wear disposable adult diapers to avoid using the lavatories, barring special circumstances, to avoid infection risks while working onboard aircraft.
- In New York City during the Holidays (such as New Year's Eve) people wear them so that they are able to relieve themselves without losing their spot.

"Diapers are something that people don't want to look at, but if you make them attractive, then people can learn about them more easily."

— Kiyoko Hamada of the Aging Lifestyle Research Center, a leading organizer of the 2008 Tokyo diaper fashion show.

Certain people believe diapers are a preferable alternative to using the toilet. According to Dr. Dipak Chatterjee of Mumbai newspaper Daily News and Analysis, public toilet facilities are so unhygienic that it is actually safer for people, especially women, who are vulnerable to infections, to wear adult diapers instead. Seann Odoms of Men's Health magazine believes that wearing diapers can help people of all ages to maintain healthy bowel function. He himself claims to wear diapers full-time for this purported health benefit. "Diapers," he states, "are nothing other than a more practical and healthy form of underwear. They are the safe and healthy way of living." Author Paul Davidson argues that it should be socially acceptable for everyone to wear diapers permanently, claiming that they provide freedom and remove the unnecessary hassle of going to the toilet, just as social advancement has offered solutions to other complications. He writes, "Make the elderly finally feel embraced instead of ridiculed and remove the teasing from the adolescent equation that affects so many children in a negative way. Give every person in this world the opportunity to live, learn, grow and urinate anywhere and anytime without societal pressure to "hold themselves in."

== Dignity issues ==
The usage of adult diapers can be a source of embarrassment, and products are often marketed under euphemisms such as "incontinence pads".

In 2006, seventeen students taking a geriatrics pharmacotherapy course participated in a voluntary "diaper experience" exercise to help them understand the impact incontinence has on older adults. The students, who wore adult diapers for a day before writing a paper about it, described the experience as unfamiliar and physically challenging, noting that being in diapers had a largely negative impact on them and that better solutions to incontinence are required. However, they praised the exercise for giving them insight into incontinence and the effect it has on peoples' lives.

In 2008, Ontario's Minister of Health George Smitherman revealed that he was considering wearing adult diapers himself to test their absorbency following complaints that nursing home residents were forced to remain in unchanged diapers for days at a time. Smitherman's proposal earned him criticism from unions who argued that the priority was not the capacity of the diapers but rather staff shortages affecting how often they were changed, and he later apologized.

== See also ==
- Incontinence pad
