= Glove fetishism =

Sexual preoccupation with gloves

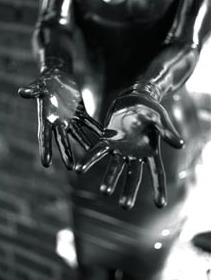
Black latex gloves

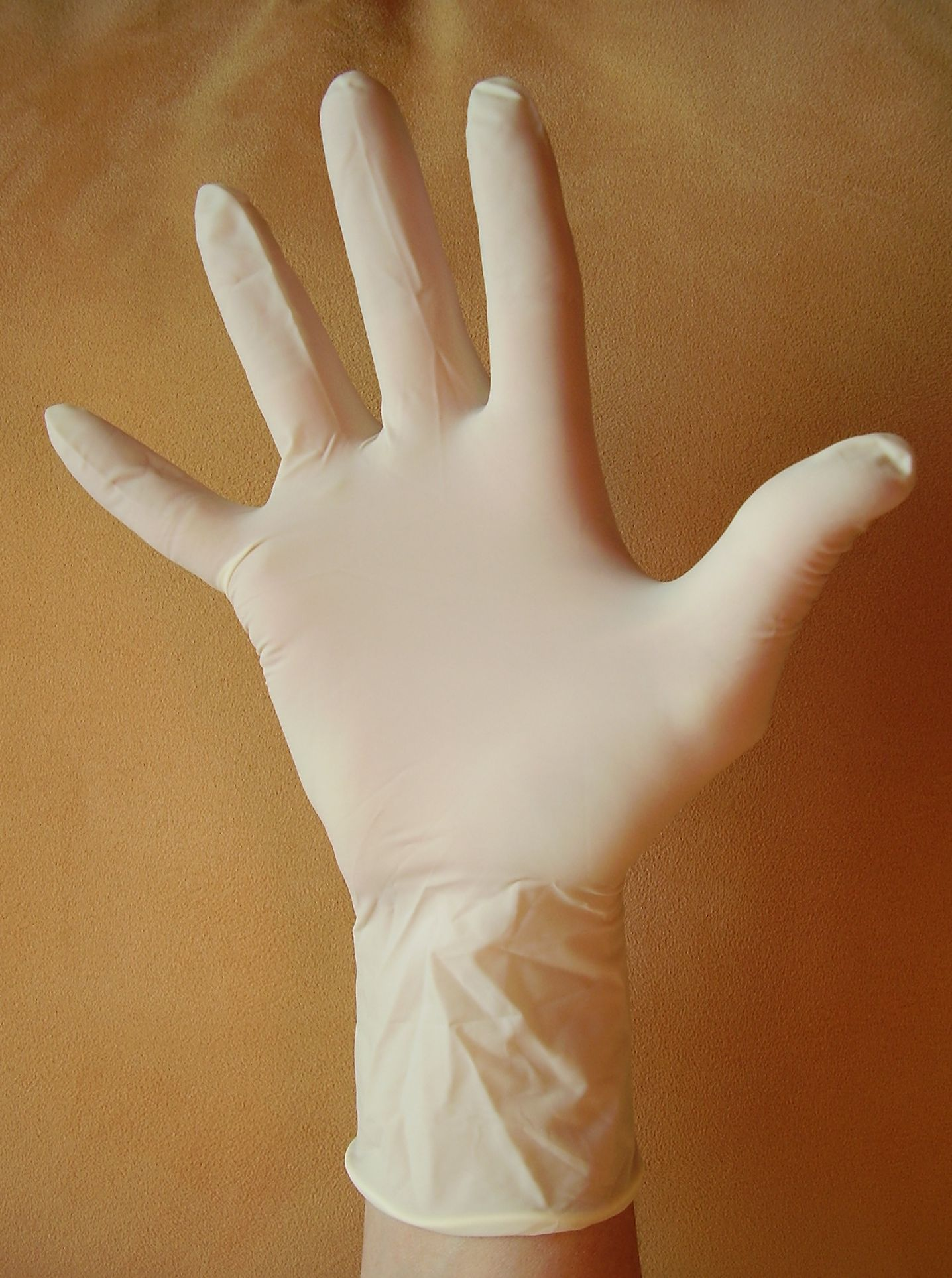
Latex

Glove fetishism is a form of sexual fetishism characterized by a sexual preoccupation with gloves of various kinds. Individuals with this fetish may experience arousal from visualizing, wearing, or interacting with gloves or gloved hands. The fetish can also be specific to gloves made from certain types of materials such as leather, cotton, latex, nitrile, PVC, satin, or nylon.

Movements made by gloved fingers or hands can provide the individual with a visual stimulus and sexual arousal. Additionally, many individuals report deriving sexual stimulation from sexual activities involving gloves worn by a partner, which can be a large part of the fetish.

== History ==
An article regarding eighteenth-century women’s gloving practices and representations of women’s gloves in the period was published in 2019 in a journal named University of Toronto Press.

== See also ==
- Fetish fashion
- Hand fetishism
- Uniform fetishism
