= Ageplay =

Roleplay involving acting as a different age

Ageplay or age play is a form of roleplay in which one or more individuals acts or treats another as if they are a different age. The term may describe a variety of roleplaying that involves a difference in age; in practice, however, ageplay usually involves one or more adults acting as young children. Ageplay generally focuses on the age aspect and its involvement in the roleplay, such as highlighting youthfulness, immaturity, or the taboo nature of one's age. Ageplay may include sexual interactions, but not necessarily.

== Characteristics and variations ==
Ageplay is a form of roleplay between one or more consenting adults. Within dominant/submissive relationships, ageplay can enhance power dynamics, and allow a partner to feel more comfortable with their dominance or submission.

A common myth is that caregiver dynamics (caregiver/little, daddy/little, mommy/little) all involve ageplay. However, these dynamics are more about caring for one another than re-enacting an incest fantasy. Research shows that there is an interest in this kind of "intergenerational play" that is distinct from incest—or kinship—play.

According to forensic psychologist Anil Aggrawal, ageplay is not related to pedophilia or any form of sex abuse. Individuals who engage in ageplay are consenting adults who enjoy imagining or portraying themselves as children, or merely enjoy childlike elements typical of children present in adults.

=== Paraphilic infantilism ===
Paraphilic infantilism, colloquially known as "adult baby" play, is a specific form of ageplay which involves one or more consenting adults roleplaying an age regression to an infant-like state. "Adult baby" play can be an expression of a fetish (or, more accurately, paraphilia) or simply as a non-sexual form of recreational adult roleplay.

Behaviors may include things such as wearing childish clothes, wearing or using diapers, cuddling with stuffed animals, drinking from a bottle or sucking on a pacifier, and (when done with others) engaging in gentle and nurturing experiences or baby talk. In more sexual cases, behaviors can extend into BDSM power dynamics involving masochism, coercion, punishment or humiliation. People who participate in paraphilic infantilism are often referred to as "adult babies" or "ABs".

Though distinct, within the kink community paraphilic infantilism is often associated with diaper fetishism under the umbrella term, "adult baby/diaper lover" or "AB/DL".

Some research has aimed to separate ageplay from the pathologized framing of paraphilic infantilism, noting in part that paraphilic infantilism is not listed within the DSM-V. This research also discourages thinking of ageplay in terms of discrete pathologized identity categories, but rather as a spectrum of intersecting identities, behaviors, and/or power dynamics.

== See also ==
- Age regression in hypnotherapy
- Disney adult
- Kidult
- Peter Pan syndrome
- Regression (psychology)
