= Paul Davidson (author) =

American author

Paul Davidson (born in Smithtown, New York in 1971) is an Entertainment executive who previously worked for Microsoft Xbox, The Orchard and IDW Entertainment. He is also an American author who is best known for his Words for My Enjoyment blog and his fiction novels Company of Foos, The Small Stuff and non-fiction humor books Consumer Joe: Harassing Corporate America, One Letter at a Time and The Lost Blogs: From Jesus to Jim Morrison. He hosts the podcast series The Side Track and has previously contributed to National Public Radio's All Things Considered, Wired Magazine, Mental Floss Magazine and The Los Angeles Times.

== Books ==
=== Consumer Joe ===
On September 9, 2003, he released his book Consumer Joe: Harassing Corporate America, One Letter at a Time. As of August 2005 the book was already entering its fourth printing and in 2007 remained on Amazon's top 200,000 book seller list.

=== The Lost Blogs ===
In July 2005, Davidson sold his second humor book, The Lost Blogs to Time Warner. The fictional humor book, which features weblogs "as written" by history's most famous figures, was published in 2006.

=== The Small Stuff ===
On April 12, 2022, Davidson released The Small Stuff, published by Hadleigh House Publishing. ISBN 978-1735773872

=== Company of Foos ===
On October 17, 2023, Davidson will release his book Company of Foos, inspired by true events.

== Film and television ==
Paul Davidson has worked as an Executive and Executive Producer in the entertainment industry. While running The Orchard indie film company he acquired and released films such as Taika Waititi's What We Do in the Shadows, Hunt for the Wilderpeople as well as Oscar-nominated documentaries Cartel Land and Life, Animated. While running the entertainment division for publisher IDW he was credited as an Executive Producer on Apple TV+'s Surfside Girls and CBC's Essex County. Previously he was also credited as a supervising line producer on The Princes of Malibu. He has also been on film crews in various capacities. He previously worked on the sci-fi comedy Grounded for Walt Disney Pictures.

== Outing Mr. Six ==
In February 2006, Davidson revealed the true identity of the Six Flags Dancing Guy Mr. Six on his blog as Queer Eye for the Straight Girl's Danny Teeson. The reveal was also confirmed in The New York Post and In Style Magazine.
