= Kink (sexuality) =

Non-normative sexual behavior

In human sexuality, kinkiness is the use of sexual practices, concepts or fantasies that are not conventional. The term derives from the idea of a "bend" (cf. a "kink") in one's sexual behaviour, to contrast such behaviour with "straight" or "vanilla" sexual mores and proclivities. It is thus a colloquial term for non-normative sexual behaviour.

The term "kink" has been claimed by some who practice sexual fetishism as a term or synonym for their practices, indicating a range of sexual and sexualistic practices from playful to sexual objectification and certain paraphilias. In the 21st century the term "kink," along with expressions like BDSM, leather and fetish, has become more commonly used than the term paraphilia.

Kink sexual practices go beyond what are considered conventional sexual practices as a means of heightening the intimacy between sexual partners. Some draw a distinction between kink and fetishism, defining the former as enhancing partner intimacy, and the latter as replacing it. Because of its relation to conformist sexual boundaries, which themselves vary by time and place, the definition of what is and is not a kink varies widely as well.

Kinks can also be engaged in non-sexually. In one study, up to 35% of participants highly involved in BDSM said it was primarily non-sexual for them. Additionally, people who identify as asexual sometimes engage in kink.

== Prevalence ==
In a study published in 2016, 1040 persons "corresponding to the norm for the province of Quebec" were interviewed; nearly half of this sample reported an interest "in at least one paraphilic category", and approximately one-third had "had experience with such a practice at least once."

A study in Czech Republic in 2020 found, in a nationally representative sample of 10,044 adults, 31.3% of men and 13.6% of women reported at least one paraphilic preference. Common interests included voyeurism, fetishism, and masochism. Men were more likely to report paraphilic preferences and behaviors overall.

In 2024, survey of 1,236 adults (18–50) in Switzerland found that 46.4% of respondents reported at least one paraphilic interest, with masochism and sexual sadism being the most common. Younger and male respondents had higher prevalence rates.

Some universities also feature student organizations focused on kinks, within the context of wider LGBTQ concerns.

== Cause ==
Speculation on the cause of kinks has implicated biological, psychological and social origins. It is sometimes assumed that kinks (particularly masochism) are the result of trauma or childhood abuse; however, research has shown that kink participants have slightly lower rates of childhood abuse and trauma than the general population.

== Precautions ==
Despite kinks being used for pleasure and enjoyment, there are some precautions people must take when participating in these actions. Especially with the rise of kinks and sexuality within recent years, this concerns young adolescents as they are more prone to indulging in risky sexual behavior. When referring to kinky behavior, it's suggested and implied that sexual practices are being conducted, which include but are not limited to BDSM, sexual and erotic behavior, fetishes, and more. Before conducting any of those behaviors, it's recommended to ask and verify for consent from all involved parties. The SSC (Safe, Sane, and Consensual) and RACK (Risk-Aware Consensual Kink) practices ensure consent and safety during kinky sex. After having the consent from the other participating party members, it's also recommended to have a safeword in place. This allows for any action to stop if a person feels it's getting out of hand

The risk of contracting HIV (Human immunodeficiency virus) and other sexually-transmitted diseases should be considered when engaging in any interpersonal sexual behavior, especially in the LGBTQ+ communities as same-sex relations may be more prone to HIV compared to heterosexual relations. Using condoms, minimizing the number of sexual partners, and using PrEP (Pre-exposure prophylaxis) can reduce the risk of HIV.

== See also ==
- Alt porn
- Dominance and submission
- Exhibitionism
- Glossary of BDSM
- Group sex
- Kink.com
- Master/slave (BDSM)
- Kink Aware Professionals (KAP)
- Risk-aware consensual kink (RACK)
- Safe, sane and consensual (SSC)
- Sexual roleplay
- Sex shop
