= Safe, sane and consensual =

Precept for ethical BDSM play

The fundamental principles for the exercise of BDSM require that it be performed with the informed consent of all parties. Since the 1980s, many practitioners and organizations have adopted the motto safe, sane and consensual, commonly abbreviated SSC, which means that everything is based on safe activities, that all participants are of sufficiently sound mind in their conduct, and that all participants do consent. It is mutual consent that makes a clear legal and ethical distinction between BDSM and such crimes as sexual assault and domestic violence. Given that many BDSM practices are illegal in many territories around the world and could result in a conviction regardless of consent, adherence to SSC and other principles and frameworks should never be considered a shield from legal liability.

Some BDSM practitioners prefer a code of behavior that differs from SSC. Described as "risk-aware consensual kink" (RACK), this code shows a preference for a style in which the individual responsibility of the involved parties is emphasized more strongly, with each participant being responsible for their own well-being. Advocates of RACK argue that SSC can hamper discussion of risk because no activity is truly "safe", and that discussion of even low-risk possibilities is necessary for truly informed consent.

== See also ==
- Consent (BDSM)
- Limits (BDSM)
- Risk-aware consensual kink (RACK)
- Safeword
