= The Hun (cartoonist) =

American cartoonist Bill Schmeling (1938–2019)

- Born: Bill Schmeling; April 30, 1938
- Died: November 12, 2019 (aged 81); Portland, Oregon
- Known for: Erotic illustration
- Notable work: Hun Comics, Gohr
- Style: Cartoonist
- Partner: Roland Bynum

Signature
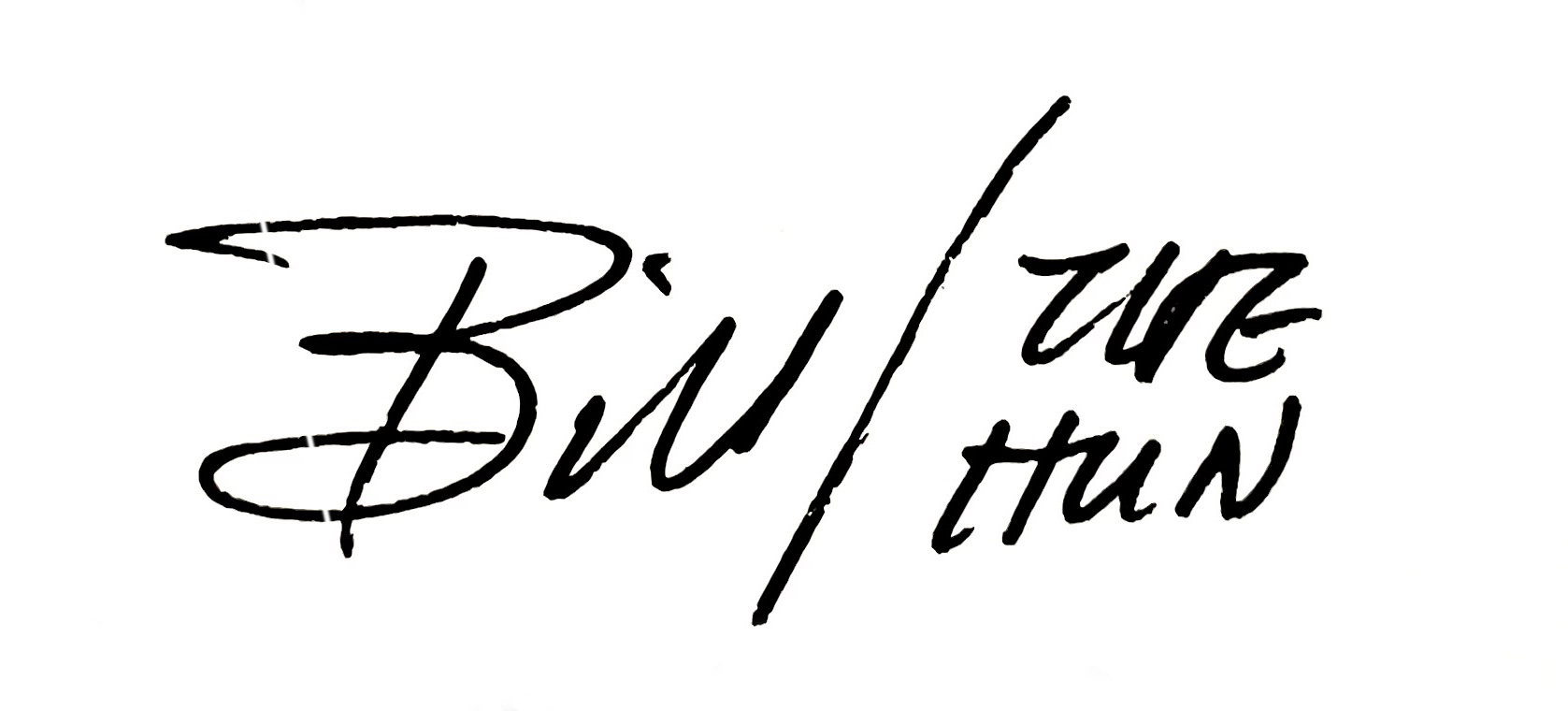

Bill Schmeling (April 30, 1938 – September 12, 2019), better known by his pen name The Hun, was an American artist active in the late twentieth and early twenty-first century, known for his explicit, homoerotic fetish illustrations and comics.

Recurring characters in his comics include Big Sig (a naïve but sexually adventurous, semi-literate young man) and Gohr (a barbarian living in a brutal, post-apocalyptic world). His art is characterized by hyper-masculine characters with exaggerated muscles, nipples, and genitalia. Sex scenes routinely involve BDSM with an emphasis on bodily fluids, including urolagnia and scatophilia. Prison rape, fisting, leather and uniform fetishes, and police and military settings are also commonplace.

== Biography ==
Cover of Hun Comics #12 by Schmeling

Schmeling lived in Portland, Oregon. At the age of five, he began drawing what he described as "hunky dudes in varying stages of undress, duress, and excess." He received no formal training, but cited Tom of Finland, Dom Orejudos, A. Jay, Rex, and Bill Ward as having considerably influenced his style.

He began professionally producing erotic art in the 1960s, doing work for Physique Pictorial and other beefcake magazines, initially under the name Torro. Using the pen name The Hun, he produced series of comics – Hun Comics and Gohr – featuring fantasy sexual adventures of gay men. Stories by Schmeling became regular features in publications such as Meatmen, Drummer, and Handjobs magazine. Schmeling also produced artwork for gay bars and businesses such as Bunkhouse (Los Angeles), Manhole (Chicago), Mineshaft (New York City), and Studstore (San Francisco), as well as commissions for private collectors.

Schmeling met his lifelong partner Roland Bynum in 1978.

Schmeling developed a close friendship with Tom of Finland during the 1980s when they lived in Los Angeles; the two men set up artist salons in their homes and shared their practices.

During the 1980s, Schmeling frequently donated art to charity auctions for AIDS patients across the country. In 1983, his work was exhibited at The Drum in Houston. Fey-Way Studios also exhibited his work. In 1986, he was featured in Naked Eyes, an artist showcase organized by Olaf Odegaard that highlighted gay men's visual art for the International Gay and Lesbian Archives.

In 1988, Schmeling collaborated with Jack Fritscher to produce two feature-length films for Palm Drive Video that highlighted hundreds of his drawings: The Hun Video Gallery 1: Rainy Night in Georgia and The Hun Video Gallery 2: Chain Gang Bang.

In 1997, Schmeling wrote a forward for 'Rasslers, 'Ranglers & Rough Guys: The Erotic of Matt, in which he expressed his longtime admiration for fellow erotic artist Charles Kerbs. In 1998, the Tom of Finland Company published The Hun Book, a collection of his work. In 2004, Nazca Plains published a second book, Fetish and Fetters: A Selection of Artwork.

In 2003, the Leslie-Lohman Museum of Art featured Schmeling alongside Michael Kirwan, Howard Cruse, Rob Clarke, and Adam (Jack Bozzi) in its Deliciously Depraved exhibit.

== Cultural impact and legacy ==
In 1995, Durk Dehner wrote:

But the truly fortunate aspect of this work is that the Hun allows us to be pigs, to be as cruel as all hell, to endure excruciating pleasure, and to dish out or take the slimy, grunting, brutal, hairy, messy, expansive limits of taboo kink. And all this happens without committing unsafe acts or cruelty to animals – oh, I mean men. He is the ultimate safe sex provider. Thank you Hun!

The Tom of Finland Foundation awards a Bill "the Hun" Schmeling Single Figure Award each year as part of its annual Emerging Artist Competition. In a 2023 online exhibit, the foundation wrote:

"His artist name (The Hun) personifies the intense subject matter of his work [...] The Hun’s works occupy a unique place among gay erotic artists. He has spearheaded a more intense style of artwork that captures scenes and fantasies often avoided by other artists as well as emphasizes a uniquely grotesque style involving oversized body parts, excess body fluids, and other features on a hyper-sexual scale."

In July 2019, Schmeling donated all of his remaining artwork, notes, and other materials to the Leather Archives & Museum (LA&M) in Chicago. The LA&M periodically sells comic reprints and merchandise featuring his art.

== Honors & awards ==
- In 1993, Schmeling received the Business of the Year award as part of the Pantheon of Leather Awards.
- In 1999, Schmeling and Hardy Haberman received the Steve Maidhof Award for National or International Work from the National Leather Association International.
- In 2002, Schmeling was inducted into the Tom of Finland Foundation's Erotic Artist Hall of Fame. He was the third person to be inducted following Tom himself (Touko Laaksonen) and H. R. Giger.
- In 2004, Schmeling received the Northwest Regional Award as part of the Pantheon of Leather Awards.
