= Domino (artist) =

American artist Donald Merrick (1929–1990)

- Poster for 1978 Stompers Gallery exhibition
- Born: Donald Merrick; August 11, 1929; Crosby, Minnesota
- Died: October 14, 1990 (aged 61); New York City
- Known for: Erotic illustration

Donald Merrick (August 11, 1929 – October 14, 1990), better known by his pen name Domino, was an American artist active in the mid to late twentieth century. He is best known for his erotic male illustrations.

== Biography ==
Merrick was born in Crosby, Minnesota on August 11, 1929. After graduating high school, he spent several years working his way across the country, including as a logger near Mount Rainier, a cab driver in Chicago, a forester in New Mexico, and a U.S. Navy serviceman. He earned a bachelor's degree in art from the School of the Art Institute of Chicago, followed by a master's degree from the University of New Mexico in 1955.

Merrick led a successful career producing mainstream art. He taught art at the University of Missouri and Virginia Commonwealth University before moving to New York City in 1960 to become art director for Arts Magazine. In 1963, he was appointed as head of the fine arts department at Farleigh Dickerson University in Rutherford, New Jersey. In 1984, he was profiled by The New York Times and his art was exhibited by at the Zim-Lerner Gallery.

Professionally, Merrick described himself as "more of a humanist - not perfect in detail, but more in terms of putting across the feeling of personality." He took inspiration from labor and preferred to depict his subjects going about their work, such police officers, truck drivers, gas station attendants, and restaurant workers. "I believe very strongly in the importance of a person's work to his life," he stated.

Despite his professional success, Merrick's true passion was producing erotic art. In a 1978 interview with Al Shapiro and Jack Fritscher, Merrick stated, "drawing the American Male was really far more vital, personal, and important to me than painting the American Scene, as I was doing professionally."

Merrick developed an attraction to men at an early age and began to draw them by his teenage years. He used the alias of Domino for his most lustful illustrations, many of which depict gay sex. (According to Fritscher, Merrick chose Domino as his pen name because it sounds similar to "Don Merrick" when quickly rolled off the tongue.) However, Merrick married a woman and during the marriage he hid and frequently destroyed his erotic art. Merrick and his wife eventually divorced.

Merrick's erotic art was heavily influenced by the working men he encountered in his youth, including dairy farmers, iron miners and U.S. Army recruits. Tight leather jackets and muddy boots "made my heart pound long before my dick did," he later recalled. Though he drew inspiration from gay erotic art, chiefly that of Tom of Finland, Merrick became disenchanted with the unattainable ideal of beauty that was often portrayed. Merrick stated:

My sexual turn-on in actual life was more real, more unique. So I set myself the ambitious task to capture in ink the different kinds of individual sex appeal that make even ugly, or dirty, or threatening men beautiful. If I could master making rough, raw, aggressive workingmen into sexual objects of desire, then, I figured, maybe I could someday match what Tom had accomplished–not with Tom’s man-of-our-fantasies, so much, as with the Domino men-of-our-realities.

After his divorce, Merrick began to preserve and share his erotic art, for which he was celebrated by the gay community. Merrick befriended other gay erotic artists, and his art was published in Drummer magazine. His erotic art was exhibited for the first time at Stomper's Gallery in New York from December 1978 through January 1979. Two months later, the exhibit moved to Fey-Way Studios, after which the show catalog was published in a book, Domino: Original Drawings and Prints.

In 1986, Merrick was featured in Naked Eyes, an artist showcase organized by Olaf Odegaard that highlighted gay men's visual art for the International Gay and Lesbian Archives.

Merrick died of AIDS-related complications on October 14, 1990.

== Cultural impact and legacy ==
In 1978, Merrick declared, "I wish to make of hot gay porn something as solid and lasting as the art of the museums." In 1980, Drummer stated, "Domino is one of the more secret erotic artists, seldom seen but constantly admired."

In 2016, Merrick's work was featured in a retrospective by the GLBT Historical Society entitled "Stroke: From Under the Mattress to the Museum Walls." In 2023, the Tom of Finland Foundation featured Merrick's erotic art in AllTogether, an exhibition of queer art to celebrate pride month. The Leather Archives & Museum in Chicago holds some of his surviving art.

== See also ==
- Leather Archives & Museum
- Michael Kirwan
