= Olaf Odegaard =

American artist and playwright (1938–1997)

Olaf
- Odegaard rehearsing Rashomon in 1959
- Born: December 15, 1938; Wisconsin
- Died: December 25, 1997 (aged 59); Los Angeles, California
- Known for: Erotic drawing

Olaf Odegaard (December 15, 1938 – December 25, 1997), better known by his pen name Olaf, was an American artist and playwright active in the latter half of the twentieth century, known for his homoerotic illustrations.

Olaf's art explores themes such as the devil, satyrs, and BDSM, including master/slave relationships. He is most well known for his graphite pencil drawings.

== Biography ==
Olaf was born in Wisconsin. He graduated from Carroll College in Waukesha in 1961. Olaf was actively involved in campus life at university. He variously wrote, directed, crewed, or starred in multiple theater productions including Macbeth, The Lady's Not For Burning, and Rashomon. He joined the Phi Theta Pi fraternity in 1958 became president of Alpha Psi Omega in 1960, and won numerous awards and honors for art and theater. In 1961, he won second place in the President's Cup oratory contest for a speech in which he "suggested that pornographic or "sick" humor is gradually replacing clever satire." That same year, Olaf and several classmates appeared on the television show "About Faces."

Olaf continued his education at Harvard Divinity School and the University of Tokyo, after which he obtained a Master of Fine Arts in play-writing from the University of Hawaii.

Olaf's erotic artwork gained prominence through features in Drummer magazine. In 1985, 30 of his erotic illustrations were published in Personals: Only Real Men Need Reply by Glenlee Enterprises; a portion of all sales from the book were donated to charity for AIDS victims.

In 1986, Olaf organized Naked Eyes, an artist showcase highlighting gay men's visual art for the International Gay and Lesbian Archives, featuring Harry Bush, Domino, The Hun, MATT, Steve Masters, Dom Orejudos, Rex, Sean, and Bill Ward, among others. His art was also exhibited at Fey-Way Studios.

Olaf reportedly lived a solitary life and struggled with housing insecurity. However, he developed close relationships with Jim Kepner and Durk Dehner, both of whom supported Olaf at times to prevent him from becoming homeless. With Dehner's help, Olaf moved into a home in Silver Lake, Los Angeles.

Cover of Beasts & Beauties: The Erotic Art of Olaf

In 1996, Dehner and the Tom of Finland Company published a 64-page book of Olaf's work entitled Beasts and Beauties: The Erotic Art of Olaf.

== Cultural impact and legacy ==
The Tom of Finland Foundation proclaimed Olaf to be the "erotic master of the graphite pencil" and one of the "greats" among Tom of Finland, Etienne, and Domino.

Olaf's remaining works were sold upon his death to fund his nephew's education. Although much of his art entered private collections, some of his works were acquired by the Leather Archives & Museum, ONE National Gay and Lesbian Archives, Leslie-Lohman Museum of Art, and Tom of Finland Foundation.

In 2015, Olaf's art was featured in The Stonewall Nation, a book and film by Sille Storihle exploring the history of the Stonewall Nation movement. Chuck Conner and Sean Platter cited Olaf as an inspiration for their 2008 comic series DEMONICSEX, which includes a foreword by Clive Barker.

In 2016, Olaf's work was featured in a retrospective by the GLBT Historical Society entitled "Stroke: From Under the Mattress to the Museum Walls." That same year he was also featured in Cock, Paper, Scissors, an exhibition and book published by the ONE Archives in collaboration with the Leslie-Lohman Museum.
