= Sean (cartoonist) =

American cartoonist

- Biff Bound, a comic by Klamik
- Born: John Klamik; July 22, 1935 Chicago
- Died: January 5, 2005 (aged 69) Anaheim, California
- Area: Cartoonist
- Pseudonyms: Sean, Shawn
- Notable works: "Gayer than Strange" "Up the Block" "Dick Darling, Hollywood Cover Boy"
- Partner: Jim Newberry

John Klamik (July 22, 1935 – January 5, 2005), better known by his pseudonyms Sean and Shawn, was an American artist specializing in gay male erotica and comics. His gay-themed cartoons were among the first to appear in US publications, including a regular feature in the early years of The Advocate. He worked under two pen names: Shawn for more mainstream gay publications such as In Touch, and Sean for fetish publications such as Drummer and Bound & Gagged.

== Career ==
Klamik was born on July 22, 1935, in Chicago, and studied at the Art Institute. He moved to West Hollywood, California in the mid-1960s, where he worked in an art factory producing paintings for hotel rooms, and as Display Director for the Akron stores.

His first erotic work was "published" in 1963, by taking photographs of the illustrations and making prints in home darkrooms. In 1965, he began doing editorial and gag comics for The Advocate, and in the late 1960s did a half-page series under the title "Gayer Than Strange".

In the 1970s he did both softcore and hardcore illustrations for erotic novels and collections of short stories published by Larry Townsend, and his Leatherman’s Handbook. In the mid 1970s he created stand-alone wordless hardcore comics Biff and Biff Bound for San Francisco publisher Le Salon, which featured centerfolds with 10 and 15 men having sex, respectively. During this time he produced eighteen 10-page comics stories for hardcore photo-story magazines published by Nova Studios, which were reprinted in Meatmen. In the 1980s he also did art direction for some of Nova's porn films and videos.

In the late 1980s Klamik produced "Up the Block", a humor comic strip set in a gay neighborhood, for Frontiers. He produced 27 installments of "Jake", a 4-page series for Jock magazine; over 20 episodes of "Dick Darling, Hollywood Cover Boy", a 2- or 4-page strip for a twink-themed porn magazine; and 7 episodes of "Johnny Guitar" for another magazine. In 1986, Klamik was featured in Naked Eyes, an artist showcase organized by Olaf Odegaard that highlighted gay men's visual art for the International Gay and Lesbian Archives.

At the end of the 1980s, he moved to Phoenix, Arizona, and continued to work with California publishers by mail. Some of his art is housed at the Leather Archives & Museum in Chicago.

== Personal life ==
Klamik advocated for gay rights by participating in picket lines and sit-ins and by helping plan the Los Angeles and West Hollywood annual gay pride parades.

In 1965 Klamik began a relationship with Jim Newberry; they remained companions until Klamik's death from lung cancer in 2005.

Klamik was a member of American Coaster Enthusiasts and reportedly rode every roller coaster in the United States, fulfilling a lifelong dream.
