= Rex (artist) =

American artist (1943–2024)

REX
- REX in 1984
- Born: 1943; United States
- Died: March 2024 (aged 80–81); Amsterdam, Netherlands
- Known for: Drawing

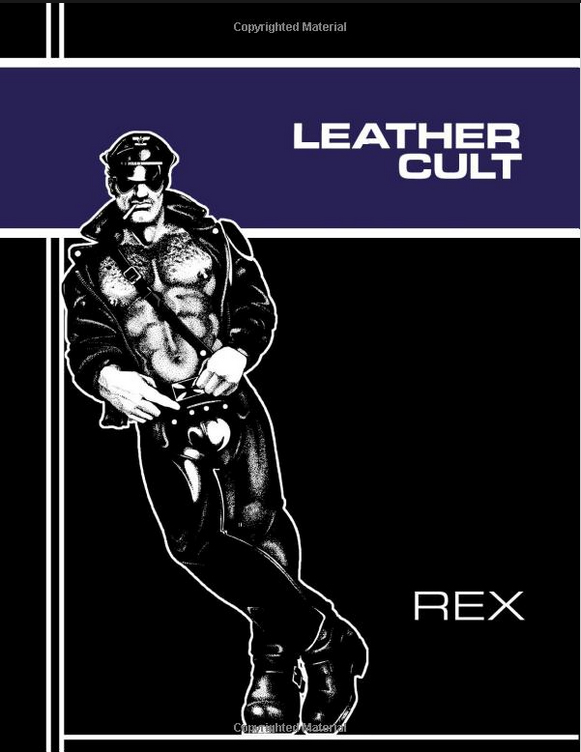
Cover of Leather Cult

REX (1943 – March 2024) was an American visual artist and illustrator closely associated with gay fetish art of 1970s and 1980s New York and San Francisco. He avoided photographs and did not discuss his personal life. His drawings influenced gay culture through graphics made for nightclubs including the Mineshaft and his influence on artists such as Robert Mapplethorpe. Much censored, he remained a shadowy figure, saying that his drawings "defined who I became" and that there are "no other 'truths' out there". REX died in Amsterdam in late March 2024.

== Early life and work ==
Abandoned at birth, his real name and exact birthday are unknown, but references indicate a date in the 1940s. Research by historian Jack Fritscher suggests his birthday was February 5, 1943. He was adopted at a young age. Being a teenager in the 1960s, he lived among beatniks and on the streets of Greenwich Village. He legally changed his name sometime in the 1970s or early '80s. While still in his teens he became the protégé of a fashion designer, who paid for two years of study at the School of Visual Arts in Manhattan. He later worked there in fashion illustration and commercial art, a career that brought him to London and Paris in the late 1960s, while maintaining an apartment on Saint Mark's Place in Manhattan's East Village. In Paris and London, "his fondest memories ... [were] the 'Cottages', the t-rooms, the public pissoirs, temples conceived and existing solely to bring relief to the male member, not distinguishing between straight or gay, and unconcerned with superficial conditions like color or religion, or how old or young, how pretty or ugly, how rich or poor the cock is."

== Career before 1980 ==
Disillusioned with commercial art, he dropped out for several years but re-emerged in the 1970s as one of the leading figures visualizing the fetish and S&M subculture in New York and later San Francisco. He was much influenced, he said, by his chance discovery of a probably bootleg magazine of the drawings of Tom of Finland, which "irrevocably changed his life." The depiction of men "having sex with men, passionately and enthusiastically" "spoke to him in a way no lover or anonymous stranger ever had."

His distinctively styled black-and-white pen-and-ink drawings quickly became synonymous with an emerging S&M graphic idiom that, in addition to Tom of Finland, included Dom Orejudos (aka Etienne and Stephen), Steve Masters ('Mike' Miksche, born David Leo Miksche, 1925–1964), and Luger (Jim French, born 1932). The raw sexual energy of REX's early drawings resonated with a leather scene that was just emerging in Greenwich Village, Chelsea and the meatpacking district (see Mineshaft).

The elusiveness of all the artists was deliberate because explicit sexual art, particularly homosexual in subject, was illegal, framed in vague language and enforced via contradictory judgments before the Stonewall riots. He said "I signed myself REX because it was non-specific and untraceable in those days by the cops". Although explicit nudes aimed at gay men would become more permissible, the conservative and homophobic social culture of the era still meant that involvement with gay pornography could have serious consequences.

As a freelance artist, initially working for pornographic series of Rough Trade pulp books (1972) illustrated with 12 images for each story, he produced poster commissions for a number of leather shops and gay bars around the US. His most famous works from this period were created for the notorious and legendary New York sex club the Mineshaft. The three posters and T-shirts he created for the club were sold in the tens of thousands during the 13 years of the club's existence and featured in the film Cruising (night interiors were filmed elsewhere, but recreated the club's interiors and include REX posters). His illustrations reflected the sexual activities and extreme end of newly empowered pre-AIDS gay community and celebrated the gay bathhouse culture blatantly and without apology. Other commissions included the 1976 poster for the pioneering sex boutique the Pleasure Chest (a sex shop) which led to his work appearing on early covers for the fledgling S&M-orientated Drummer magazine in 1977 and to advertisements for a brand of poppers, BOLT, in 1980. Commuting between New York and San Francisco, REX also produced posters, catalogues and calendars for The Trading Post, considered the first gay department store (1978 to 1981).

== Later career ==
On July 1, 1981, REX opened his own gallery, Rexwerk, in his South of Market (SOMA) studio on Hallam Street in San Francisco. Only ten days later it was destroyed in a fire started at The Barracks bathhouse that was undergoing renovation across the street. The fire could not have come at a worse time, for July 1981 was also the same month the first case of (what a year later was called) AIDS was diagnosed in the city of San Francisco. His commercial work and original art nonetheless continued to appear as regular features in sexual magazines such as Manifest, Just Men, Torso, Inches, Uncut, and In Touch. Other erotic artists such as Allen J ('A.Jay') Shapiro (died 1987), Harry Bush (1925–1994), and British artist Bill Ward were colleagues. Later commissions included posters for gay bars such as The Brig (San Francisco), The Eagle (Washington, D.C.), Lone Star Saloon (San Francisco), and The Lure (New York City). He also created posters for the original The Saint parties.

In 1986, Rex was featured in Naked Eyes, an artist showcase organized by Olaf Odegaard that highlighted gay men's visual art for the International Gay and Lesbian Archives.

When the AIDS epidemic emerged, the increasingly negative attitude towards the sexually liberated scene in both San Francisco and New York led to panic measures from civic authorities and calls from within the gay community to suppress and discourage sexual permissiveness and promiscuity, so prominently a feature of REX's work. Rather than submit to what he regarded as the resulting suffocating censorship, and increasingly depressed by the deaths from AIDS of nearly all his contemporaries, REX stopped publishing his work for several years. In 1992 he returned to New York and opened a 'by appointment only' private gallery called The Secret Museum at 218 Madison Avenue until the events of 9/11 closed down Manhattan's economy. In early 2002 he returned full-time to San Francisco where he had maintained a room over the Zeitgeist Bar on Valencia Street during his bi-coastal years between Manhattan and San Francisco (1976–2010). Disheartened by the conservative trend and lack of opportunities open to him in what he saw as an increasingly 'Politically Correct' America, he moved to Europe in 2010 to live and work in Amsterdam.

== Standalone works ==
REX published three 8- by 11-inch, 36-page bound portfolios of his black-and-white ink drawings entitled Mannspielen (Man Games). The increasingly conservative political climate meant newsstands refused to sell them and from the start of the 1980s, his main source of income came from his mail-order business called 'Drawings by REX', which issued privately printed, unbound portfolios of hard-core images. Beginning with Icons (1977), a series of portfolios were advertised. Rarely shown or seen in their entirety, these carefully considered and structured sets are diminished in isolation or redacted details. Most artists of the era issued photographic prints, not art prints. The only comparable previous works of this type were the commercially made lithographic prints of George Quaintance who also independently marketed his in the early 1950s.

His series of 8- by 10-inch, 12-print unbound portfolios were entitled (chronologically) Rexwerk, Uncut, Undercover, Armageddon, Scorpio, Rexland, Legends and REX Sex-Freak Circus. The unbound format proved popular with buyers who had been frustrated by the need to dismantle the earlier bound book format collections to frame their favorite images. Rex's drawings, made over months, defy the throw-away nature of most pure pornography and are more akin to a graphic novel, gay comics, and the Japanese tradition of shunga prints. The 'standalone' portfolio images are highly polished and sophisticated, akin to the work of Franz von Bayros (1866–1924), known for his scandalous Tales from the Dressing Table portfolio. The mood of REX's flophouse interiors find parallels in the private edition of Jean Genet's verses for Parade, illustrated with twenty explicitly homoerotic lithographs of drawings by Roland Caillaux (1905–1977).

== Reception and exhibitions ==
Robert Mapplethorpe knew REX and was attracted to his hard-core imagery relating to the Mineshaft. The photographer developed a photographic portfolio that reflected the same themes and, like REX, had strong links with the West Coast fetish scene (they both had work published by Drummer magazine editor Jack Fritscher). The photographer was more focused on Los Angeles whilst REX preferred San Francisco. His work secured an invitation in April 1978 from Robert Opel to have a one-man exhibit at his newly opened Fey Wey Gallery on Harrison Street in San Francisco. REX's hyper-masculine men of this period were best described by Jack Fritscher, who was also one of Mapplethorpe's lovers, who met REX in person for the first time at the opening:

Rex is artist of urban toilets, blue-collar hotels, filthy construction workers, greasy gas jockeys, muscled bikers, tattooed fighters, beautiful young homeless bums ... ex-cons, armpit-sweaty beautiful studs needing head – all these unshaved "lone wolves" in jockstraps, leather, boots, and torn tanktops ... who pay-per-night in sleaze-bag hotels where sailors, Marines, cops, and drifters lie back on stained mattresses, the smoke of their cigarettes drifting out the crack of their rooms, down to the toilet where the cracked urinal drips beer piss, and the graffiti-covered stall is drilled with gloryholes ...

Like Mapplethorpe's pictures, any exhibition of such scenes, which also include imagery occasionally suggesting bestiality, urolagnia and sexual involvement with boys, are rare and dogged by controversy. In 1985 REX was selected as one of the city's "100 Most Influential Artists" and shown as part of the Mayor's Art Gala. He was represented by a work entitled 'Dogtreats' which drew immediate press condemnation in the San Francisco Chronicle. Richard D. Mohr (Department of Philosophy at University of Illinois) struggled to find a publisher for Gay Ideas: Outing and Other Controversies (1994) specifically because it included work by REX. Richard Goldstein, writing in Village Voice, condemned the sexual activities of the fetish community and what he called its 'Naziphile' sympathies, pointing to REX's work as evidence. There have been few publicly accessible exhibitions of the artist's work as a result, although he found a more accepting climate in Amsterdam. The Leather Archives & Museum in Chicago featured an exhibit in 2021 showcasing a broad spectrum of REX's art, including a few of his controversial pieces.

== Cultural impact and legacy ==
A hardcover book of fifty drawings (Rexwerk) was published in Paris in 1986 by Les Pirates Associes, a private press run by photographers Ralf Marsault and Heino Muller, and Bruno Gmunder issued a book retrospective 'Verboten' in 2012 (the more controversial images were not included in this edition reflecting more nervousness around the subjects).

A retrospective 'Persona Non Grata' was held at the nascent Leslie Lohman Museum of Gay and Lesbian Art's early Prince's Street Address in 1994 (REX's work is held by the Museum), but the complex and compelling imagery of the late 1980s and early 1990s in particular is still largely ignored and invisible in the mainstream art world (Sex Freak Circus was shown for one night only on March 7, 2013, under the auspices of the Lohman Foundation and The Saint nightclub).

In a book about his friend the Photographer David Hurles REX discussed what he regarded as the hypocritical attitude towards his brand of gay erotica, over "cookie cutter nudes" and "antiseptic, nonthreatening males posed in luxurious settings... an idealized homo-eroticism with which viewers could feel at ease."

He exhibited with CNCPT13 in Amsterdam and Uncle Crickey's Closet in San Francisco. The artist lived and worked in both Amsterdam and the US, and maintained a pay-to-view website. An exhibition of his work took place during Folsom Europe in Berlin in September 2016. REX was inducted into the Leather Hall of Fame in 2022. A new authorized collection of the artist's work compiled by a supporter, entitled Leather Cult, was published in 2023.

REX's art considerably influenced the style of other erotic artists including Bill Schmeling. The Leather Archives & Museum in Chicago holds some of his art.
