= Michael Kirwan (artist) =

American artist (1953–2018)

- Kirwan in the 1970s
- Born: December 27, 1953; New York City
- Died: May 26, 2018 (aged 64); Los Angeles
- Known for: erotica
- Notable work: Just So Horny
- Website: http://KirwanArts.com

Michael Kirwan (December 27, 1953 – May 26, 2018) was an American artist, known for his distinctively stylized erotic illustrations and comics, published in more than 600 magazines. Although he focused primarily on homoerotic themes, he also produced substantial work for the heterosexual and fetish markets. He worked primarily in Prismacolor markers and permanent ink.

== Biography ==
Kirwan was born on December 27, 1953, in New York City. His family was poor, so as a child he drew on paper grocery bags. He attended a middle school run by the Catholic Archdiocese of New York that allowed the most gifted students to take art classes.

He married his high-school girlfriend when she became pregnant, and they had a son Larry. She divorced him due to his sexual infidelity with men, in the late 1970s.

Kirwan began producing homoerotic art in the early 1980s, inspired by his job as an attendant at St. Mark's Baths, a gay sex club. His first published work appeared in Playguy magazine. He produced monthly comic strips for Playguy, including The Roadboys, which ran from October 1995 through September 1997; The Adventures of Richie Tease, from October 1997 through January 1999; and Beginner's Luck, which began in July 1999.

In all, his art was published in over 600 magazines. As the market for magazine illustrations declined, Kirwan turned to commissioned work.

He spent a year as the first Artist in Residence with the Tom of Finland Foundation, which inducted him into its Erotic Artist Hall of Fame in 2004. The Leslie-Lohman Museum of Art featured Kirwan alongside Bill Schmeling, Howard Cruse, Rob Clarke, and Adam (Jack Bozzi) in its Deliciously Depraved exhibit in 2003. Bruno Gmünder published Just So Horny, a 128-page collection of his work, in 2011. A collection of his comics work – including the serials for Playguy – was published in 2026, as Just So Horny Comix.

In 2018, Kirwan was featured in the Museum of Contemporary Art Detroit's TOM House: The Work and Life of Tom of Finland exhibit.

Kirwan died in his sleep on May 26, 2018. The Leather Archives & Museum in Chicago houses some of his art.

== Style ==
Cover of Just So Horny by Michael Kirwan, showing some of the range of characters depicted in his work

Rather than a photorealist or idealist approach, he drew characters cartoonishly, to "universalize" the scenes for audience identification. He depicted diverse subjects – including inter-racial and inter-generational scenes, and people from different socio-economic backgrounds – who were not physical ideals, sometimes with disabilities or physical deformities.

Kirwan once wrote "my guys are stand-ins for everyone who's ever sucked a dick. [...] I'd like viewers to recognize familiar situations and see a spark of their own lives displayed in my work." His style has been likened to Paul Cadmus, Robert Crumb, and George Grosz, and contrasted with that of Tom of Finland.

== Cultural impact & legacy ==
Kirwan indicated his subjects were inspired by the people he encountered in what he called "the homo realm" of everyday life. Critics lauded his depiction of everyday, regular people.

In 2003, Wayne Snellen, director of the Leslie-Lohman Museum of Art, wrote:

Michael Kirwan's work finds a vibrantly colorful world in the day-to-day realities of gay erotic life. [...] Unlike many gay artists, Kirwan deliberately avoids idealizing his subjects, portraying men of ages, races and appearances well outside the "Tom of Finland" mold. The result provides an exuberantly raunchy, yet tender window into typical gay sexual experiences beyond the view of the larger straight world.

In 2018, the Tom of Finland Foundation wrote, "Michael’s drawings exposed the fevered excitement and erotic beauty in every body and face. Michael always said he did not draw “pretty” guys because he knew regular guys had better sex."

In 2019 the National Leather Association International established an award named after Kirwan for creators of erotic art in the style of Expressionism.

== See also ==
- Leather Archives & Museum
- Domino (artist)
