= Ad Schuring =

Dutch theatre set and lighting designer

Ad Schuring (1950–2024), born Adrianus Schuring, was a Dutch theatre set and lighting designer who was known for advocating for homoerotic art.

In 2016, Schuring received a Dedication Award from the Tom of Finland Foundation. Schuring was a longtime member of the Delft Homosexuality Working Group DWH.
