= George Dureau =

American artist (1930–2014)

- Dureau with his artwork, circa 1965
- Born: December 28, 1930; New Orleans, Louisiana, United States
- Died: April 7, 2014 (aged 83); Kenner, Louisiana, U.S.
- Education: LSU and Tulane University
- Known for: Painter, photographer

George Valentine Dureau (December 28, 1930 – April 7, 2014) was an American artist whose long career was most notable for charcoal sketches and black and white photography of poor white and black athletes, dwarfs, and amputees. Robert Mapplethorpe is said to have been inspired by Dureau's amputee and dwarf photographs, which showed the figures as "exposed and vulnerable, playful and needy, complex and entirely human individuals."

== Biography ==
Dureau was born to Clara Rosella Legett Dureau and George Valentine Dureau in the Lakeview neighborhood of New Orleans, Louisiana. He was raised in nearby Bayou St. John. He graduated with a fine arts degree from LSU in 1952, after which he began architectural studies at Tulane University. He briefly served in the U.S. Army. Before being able to survive as an artist, he worked for Kreeger's, a New Orleans department store, as a display designer/window dresser. For the vast majority of his life, he lived in the French Quarter, where he was well known for his eccentricity and hospitality. His friend and student, Robert Mapplethorpe restaged many of his earlier black and white photographs. Dureau died of Alzheimer's disease.

== Works ==
Some of his pieces are held by the Ogden Museum of Southern Art and the Leather Archives & Museum. Several of his works are displayed publicly throughout New Orleans, most notably, the pediment sculpture for Harrah's New Orleans, and his cast-bronze sculptures stand sentinel at the entrance gates of New Orleans City Park. His depiction of a Mardi Gras parade dominates one wall in Gallier Hall. "Black 1973–1986," an exhibition of black and white photographs concentrating on young black men at the Higher Pictures gallery in New York City, garnered rave reviews.

== Selected publications ==
- Lucie-Smith, Edward (1985). George Dureau New Orleans: 50 Photographs. London: GMP Publishers Ltd. ISBN 0-907040-47-0.
- Gefter, Philip (2016). George Dureau, The Photographs. New York: Aperture. ISBN 978-1-59711-284-0.
- Smith, Howard Philips (2025). George Valentine Dureau: Life and Art in New Orleans. Jackson: University Press of Mississippi.
