= Tony DeBlase =

American leatherman (1942–2000)

- Born: Anthony DeBlase; April 3, 1942; South Bend, Indiana, US
- Died: July 21, 2000 (aged 58); Portland, Oregon, US
- Other names: Fledermaus; Richard W. Krousher
- Years active: 1979–2000
- Known for: Designer of the leather pride flag Co-founder of the Leather Archives & Museum

Anthony DeBlase (April 3, 1942 – July 21, 2000) was an American author. A member of the BDSM and leather subcultures, he was the designer of the leather pride flag.

== Leather and BDSM activities ==
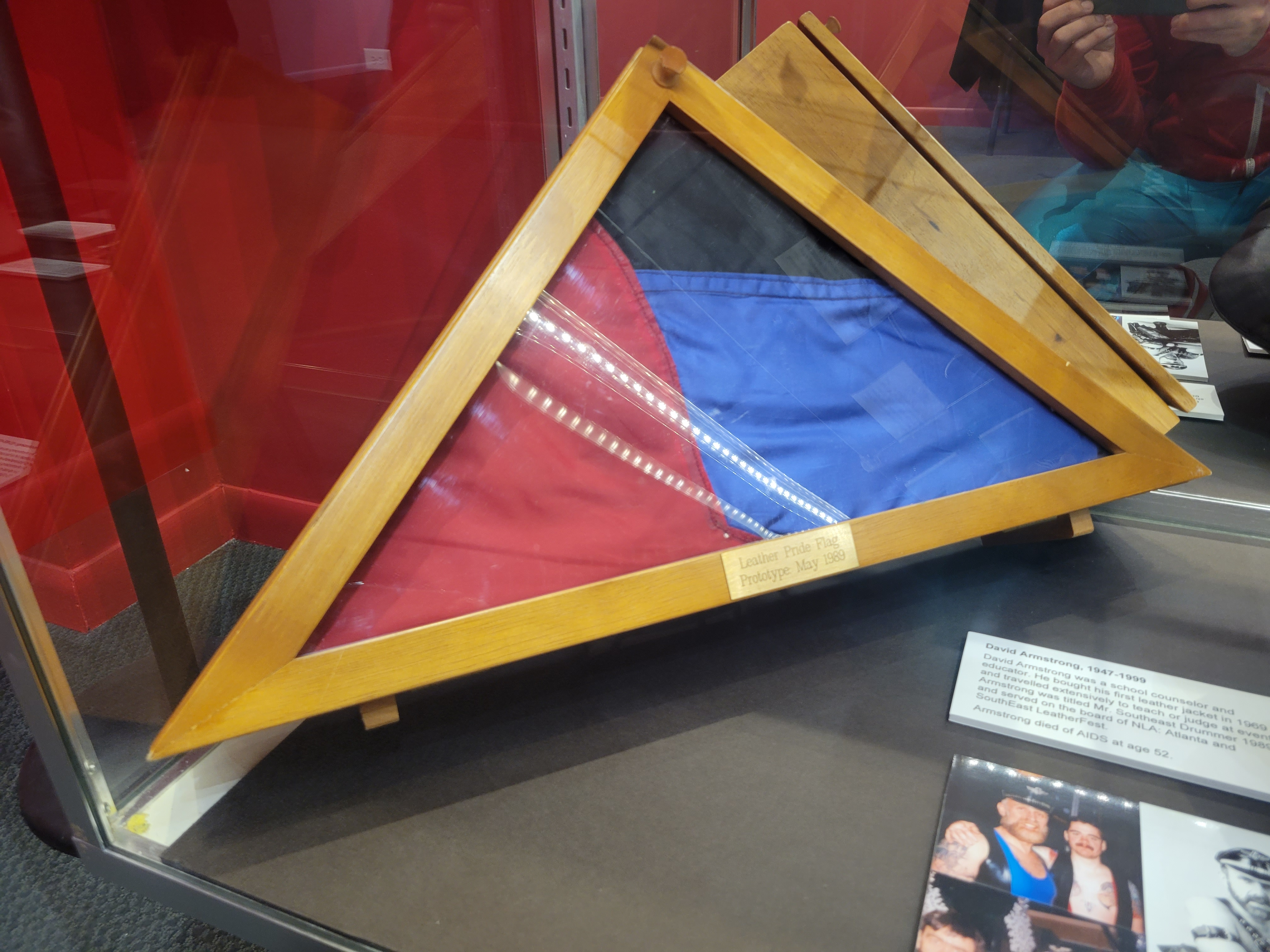
The prototype leather pride flag, created by Tony DeBlase in 1989, on display at the Leather Archives & Museum.

In 1979, he founded DungeonMaster, a magazine about sadomasochistic technique. Running from 1979 until 1994, he also wrote for it.

In 1982, under the pen name Fledermaus, he published a collection of fictional sadomasochism stories, titled The Fledermaus Anthology.

In 1986, the leather magazine Drummer was sold to DeBlase, who sold it in 1991 to Martijn Bakker, owner of RoB Amsterdam.

On May 28, 1989, DeBlase first presented the leather pride flag (which he had designed), at International Mister Leather.

Initial reaction to the flag was mixed. According to DeBlase's article A Leather Pride Flag,

"Some, particularly on the east coast, reacted positively to the concept, but were quite concerned, some even offended, that I had not involved the community in helping to create the design."

On September 18, 1990, Clive Platman (Mr. Australia Drummer) presented DeBlase with an Australian version of the flag, incorporating the Southern Cross, which is from the Australian national flag, with the original design of the leather pride flag.

In 1991, the Leather Archives & Museum (the LA&M) was founded by DeBlase and Chuck Renslow, "as a community archives, library, and museum of Leather, kink, fetish, and BDSM history and culture." DeBlase served as Vice President of the Board of Directors there from 1992 until 2000. He also began a Leather History Timeline, which was set up in the LA&M on the south wall of the main exhibit gallery. His papers (among other things) are held in the LA&M.

At International Mr. Leather 1999 DeBlase presented one of three original leather pride flags which he assembled as a prototype to the Leather Archives & Museum.

== Awards ==
- 1987: NLA's Man of the Year award
- 1990: Business Person of the Year Award during the Pantheon of Leather Awards
- 1997: Forebear Award during the Pantheon of Leather Awards
- 2001: Community Choice (Man) Award during the Pantheon of Leather Awards
- 2010: Induction into the Leather Hall of Fame
- 2014: Lifetime Achievement Award during the Pantheon of Leather Awards
- 2017: Induction in the San Francisco South of Market Leather History Alley
- Knight as a Chevalier at the Leather Coronation in San Francisco
- Caligula Award from the Chicago Hellfire Club, of which he was a member

In 2021, the Leather Archives & Museum gave out the Chuck Renslow & Tony DeBlase Founders’ Award.

== Career ==
DeBlase was a mammologist who specialized in bat biology. He co-wrote A Manual of Mammalogy: With Keys to Families of the World (1974) with Robert Eugene Martin. He also wrote "The bats of Iran: systematics, distribution, ecology", "New distributional records of bats from Iran", and "Notes on bats (Chiroptera: Vespertilionidae) new to the faunal lists of Afghanistan and Iran". He had experience collecting bats in Indiana, Oklahoma, and Texas.

== Personal life ==
DeBlase died of liver failure in 2000.
