= Robert Opel =

American photographer and art gallery owner (1939–1979)

- Opel streaking during the Academy Awards ceremony in 1974, with host David Niven
- Born: Robert Oppel; October 23, 1939; East Orange, New Jersey, U.S.
- Died: July 8, 1979 (aged 39); San Francisco, California, U.S.
- Cause of death: Murder
- Occupations: Photographer, art gallery owner
- Known for: Streaking incident at the 46th Academy Awards ceremony

Robert Opel (né Oppel; October 23, 1939 – July 8, 1979) was an American photographer and art gallery owner most famous for streaking during the 46th Academy Awards in 1974.

== Early life and education ==
Opel was born in East Orange, New Jersey, in 1939. As a child, he lived in Canada, Kansas, and Kentucky before his family settled in Pittsburgh, Pennsylvania, where he attended grade school, high school, and college. Born Robert Oppel, he dropped the second "p" from his name after becoming an activist to distance himself from his family in Pittsburgh. Opel was concerned his activities would cause the family embarrassment.

In college, Opel was elected to Student Congress, and served as chairman of a regional debate team.

== Career ==
In 1966, he worked as a speechwriter for Ronald Reagan's gubernatorial campaign. In 1974, Opel taught English as a second language for the Los Angeles Unified School District. He was fired from that job following the Oscars incident.

Opel owned his own photography business, Ideas Photographic. Among his clients were the LGBT publication The Advocate and Finger magazine, where he was also an editor.

In 1976, he announced his candidacy for the U.S. Presidency, using the slogans "Nothing to Hide" and "Not Just Another Crooked Dick", referring to the streaking incident and President Richard Nixon, respectively (Nixon had resigned from office in disgrace in 1974).

In March 1978, Opel opened Fey-Way Studios, a gallery of gay male art, at 1287 Howard Street in San Francisco. The gallery helped bring such erotic gay artists as Tom of Finland and Robert Mapplethorpe to national attention and showed others, such as Dom Orejudos, Domino, Bill Schmeling, Al Shapiro, Chuck Arnett, Olaf Odegaard, and Rex.

In 1979, he was in a relationship with Camille O'Grady, till his death the same year.

== Streaking incident at the 1974 Oscars ==
On April 2, 1974, Opel apparently posed as a journalist to gain entry to the stage at the 46th Academy Awards at the Dorothy Chandler Pavilion in Los Angeles. He ran naked past David Niven flashing a peace sign while Niven was introducing Elizabeth Taylor.

After breaking into laughter momentarily, Niven regained his composure, turned to the audience and quipped, "Well, ladies and gentlemen, that was almost bound to happen... But isn't it fascinating to think that probably the only laugh that man will ever get in his life is by stripping off and showing his shortcomings?"

Later, some evidence arose suggesting that Opel's appearance was facilitated by the show's producer, Jack Haley Jr., as a stunt. Robert Metzler, the show's business manager, believed that the incident had been planned in some way. He said that, during the dress rehearsal, Niven had asked Metzler's wife to borrow a pen so he could write down the famous ad-lib. Opel apparently had to cut through an expensive background curtain in order to reach the stage.

== Death ==
Opel was hosting friends at his studio on July 8, 1979, when two armed men, Robert E. Kelly and Maurice Keenan, stormed the studio in an attempted robbery. They demanded drugs and money; Opel denied he had money and proceeded to kick them out. Opel was shot at close range and was pronounced dead at 10:40 p.m. He was 39 years old. Kelly was sentenced to 25 years to life. Keenan was sentenced to death, but the sentence was later commuted to life imprisonment. As of 2025, Keenan is still serving his life sentence for the murder.

== Legacy ==
The 2010 biographical documentary Uncle Bob was produced and directed by Opel's nephew, Robert Oppel. In addition to narration and reenactments by Oppel, the film includes interviews with John Waters, Divine, Daniel Nicoletta, Mark Thompson, Jack Fritscher, and others. Oppel attempted to interview the two men serving life in prison for his uncle's murder, but was denied by Pelican Bay State Prison.

Robert Oppel and curator Rick Castro installed "Robert Opel: The Res-erection of Fey-Way Studios", a 2014 art show at Antebellum Gallery in Los Angeles, featuring original artworks, posters, and memorabilia from Fey-Way circa 1978–1979.

Opel was honored as part of the 2017 San Francisco South of Market Leather History Alley, named on a bronze bootprint.

His streaking was commemorated 50 years later during the 96th Academy Awards when John Cena presented the award for Best Costume Design naked and covered only by the envelope.
