= Gabriel Martinez (artist) =

American artist (born 1973)

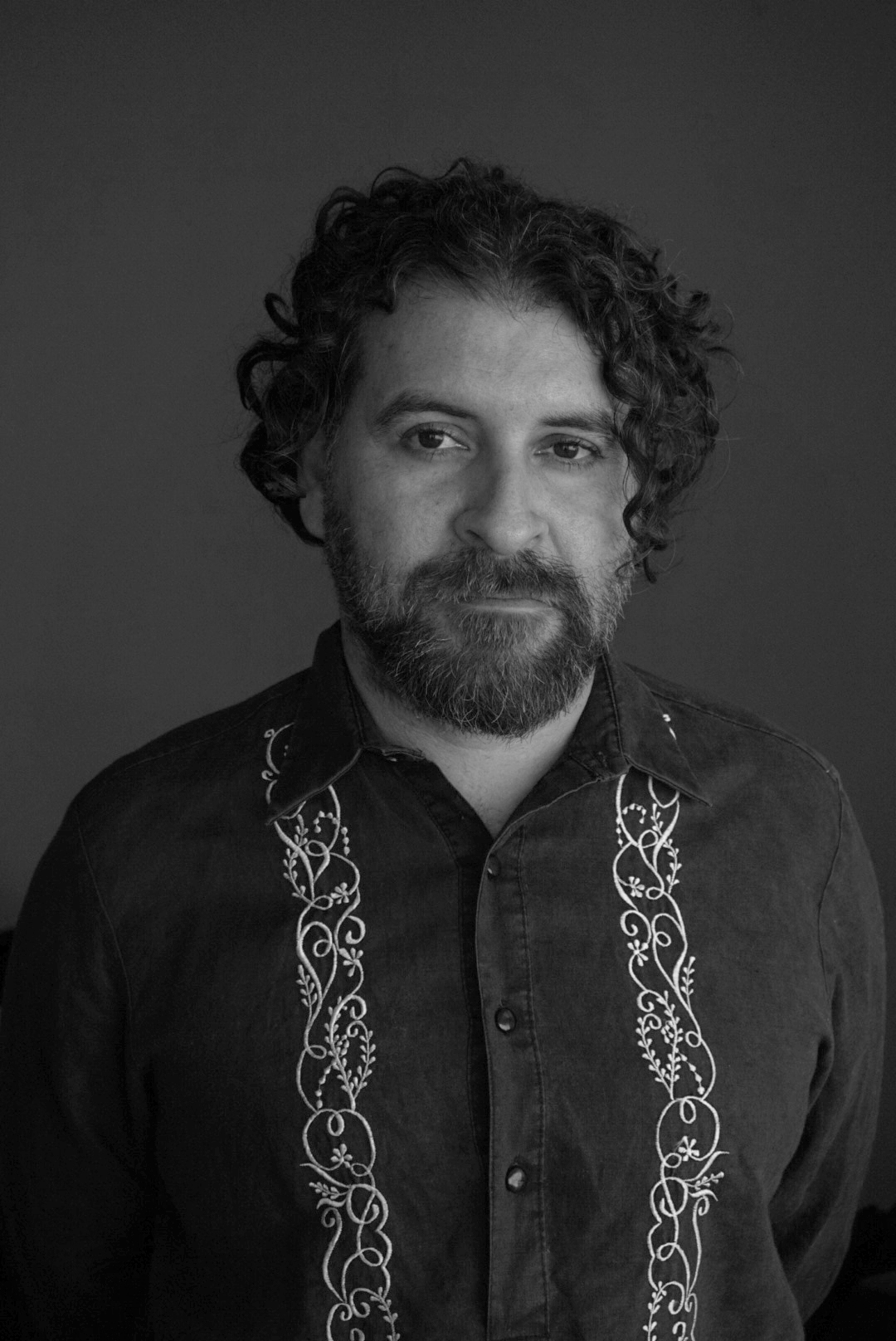
- Born: 1973; Alamogordo, New Mexico, United States
- Education: Columbia University
- Alma mater: Columbia University; School of Art
- Website: gabrielmartinezartist.com

Gabriel Martinez (born 1973 in Alamogordo, New Mexico) is an artist, writer, and performer based in Houston, Texas, working mostly in sculpture, installation and performance.

Martinez graduated from Columbia University in 2007 with a Masters of Fine Arts in Visual Arts. Martinez attended Skowhegan School of Painting and Sculpture in 2006 and the Whitney Independent Study Program. He was a Joan Mitchell Foundation Fellowship recipient in 2019. Martinez has been an artist-in-residence at both the Joan Mitchell Center and at MacDowell.

Martinez's work over the last twenty-two years digs into the relationship between art, public space and collective memory in order to uncover lost social histories. Martinez has established a set of ongoing gestures based on his interactions with American cities, including urban guerrilla interventions, gathering and repurposing street debris and re-appropriations of public semiotic codes. Martinez understands the relationship between art and public spaces not from the standpoint of an integration with architecture and the landscape, but in a more radical if precarious, civic sense of art in the public interest. Wandering through the narrow shoulders of car-centric cities, Martinez operates as a gleaner in a wasteland, rummaging through glass, bricks, trash and signage. The public artist becomes a rag picker of signs and refuse.

His best-known for his publication Garments Gathered from the Street Are Placed Back Into Circulation As Luxury Objects Published in 2025 by Sabian Press.

Martinez held the position of Editor-in-Chief of Glasstire from January 2024 to April 2025 and is director of Alabama Song Houston an experimental sound art space.

Martinez's work has been exhibited extensively: the Leather Archives & Museum (2023-2024); the Philadelphia Museum of Art (2006); Bernice Steinbaum Gallery, Miami, FL (2004); Philadelphia Art Alliance (2003); Nexus Gallery, Philadelphia (1998, 1995); White Columns, New York, NY (1995). Over seventy group exhibitions since 1989, including Exit Art, NY (2006, 2005); Art Mur Gallery, Montreal, Canada (2005); Gallery Muu, Helsinki, Finland (2004); Athens Institute for Contemporary Art, Athens, GA (2004); Miami Art Central, Miami, FL (2004); Goliath Visual Space, Brooklyn, NY (2004); Samson Projects, Boston (2004); Thread Waxing Space, New York, NY (2000); Cleveland Museum of Art, Cleveland, OH (2000); Fabric Workshop & Museum, Philadelphia, PA (1998); Philadelphia Museum of Art (1998, 1997); Franklin Furnace, New York (1997); Institute of Contemporary Art, Philadelphia (1996); Centro Cultural Ricardo Rojas, Buenos Aires, Argentina (1995); ABC No Rio, New York (1992).

== Books and catalogues ==
- Self-Portraits (Samson Projects, 2007)
- Garments Gathered from the Street Are Placed Back Into Circulation As Luxury Objects (Sabian Press, 2025)
