= Bound & Gagged (magazine) =

American fetish magazine

- Cover of Bound & Gagged #106, the final issue
- Editor-in-chief: Bob Wingate
- Categories: Gay Men's
- Publisher: Outbound Press
- Founder: Bob Wingate
- Founded: November 1987
- Final issue: June 2005
- Country: U.S.
- Based in: New York City
- Language: English
- Website: www.boundandgagged.com

Bound & Gagged (ISSN 1058-6849) magazine was published by the Outbound Press from 1987 to 2005. The magazine was dedicated to the interests of gay bondage and discipline practitioners and provided articles about actual encounters, fictional encounters, techniques, fantasies and images of bound and gagged men. It was headquartered in New York City.

According to Bob Wingate, owner of the Outbound Press, publisher and editor of Bound & Gagged,

"When Bound & Gagged first appeared on the scene, there was virtually nothing else out there. Drummer published bondage stories and photos from time to time, but there was nothing devoted to bondage in all its varied manifestations, from average guys simply cuffing and rope tying each other for fun, to whole ritualistic life-styles in leather and latex, making use of the most elegant and expensive restrictive devices—not to mention everything in between."

A complete set of Bound & Gagged is preserved at the Leather Archives and Museum, as are the 25-box collection of papers of Robert W. Davolt, the editor of Bound & Gagged. In 2017 Davolt was honored along with other notables, named on bronze bootprints, as part of San Francisco South of Market Leather History Alley.

== Suspension of operations ==
Bound & Gagged was first published in November 1987. The founder was Bob Wingate. The magazine suspended publication immediately after issue #106 in June 2005 following the death of Robert W. Davolt, the magazine's editor.
