= Drummer (magazine) =

American gay BDSM culture magazine

- Editor in Chief: Darkqwolf
- Former editors: Jack Fritscher (1977–1979); Robert Payne; Robert W. Rowberry; Mike Miksche; Drew Kramer
- Categories: BDSM, gay, leather subculture
- Publisher: Sir Jack MacCullum
- Founder: John H. Embry; Jeanne Barney
- First issue: 1975
- Country: United States
- Based in: Wilmington, Delaware
- Language: English
- Website: drummermen.com

Drummer is an American magazine which focuses on "leathersex, leatherwear, leather and rubber gear, S&M, bondage and discipline, erotic styles and techniques." The magazine was launched in 1975 and ceased publication in April 1999 with issue 214, but was relaunched 20 years later by new publisher Jack MacCullum with editor Mike Miksche.

During the late 20th century, it was the most successful of the American leather magazines, and sold overseas. The magazine was originally focused on quality writing about leather but gradually changed into more of a photo magazine.

Among the writers and artists featured in the magazine have been Phil Andros, Chuck Arnett, Tim Barrus, Rick Castro, Domino, Donelan, Lars Eighner, Tom of Finland, Fred Halsted, David Hurles, MATT, Scott Masters, Robert Opel, Olaf Odegaard, Dom Orejudos (Etienne), Rex, Anne Rice (as A.N. Roquelaure), Bill Schmeling, Larry Townsend, Aaron Travis, and Bill Ward. For a while, during its initial run, it featured comic strips starring gay secret agent Harry Chess by Al Shapiro (under the name "A. Jay"). Photographer Robert Mapplethorpe contributed a photograph for the cover of #24, September 1978.

== History ==
=== Original run ===
Drummer was founded in Los Angeles by John H. Embry and Jeanne Barney, but because of police harassment moved to San Francisco in 1977, with Jack Fritscher as new editor-in-chief. Fritscher became the magazine's most frequent contributor as editor, writer, and photographer. Subsequent editors included Robert Payne and Robert W. Rowberry.

Despite Fritscher's personal dislike for Nazism, the gay National Socialist League was allowed to advertise in Drummer during the 1970s and 1980s. Today, the magazine states a zero-tolerance policy for writers, artists, or organizations associated with hate of any kind, including racism, transphobia, and misogyny.

In his book Gay Pioneers: How Drummer Shaped Gay Popular Culture 1965-1999, Fritscher stated that Embry "allowed publication of advice, names, and addresses of magazines featuring minors, including younger children", as well as advertisements for purchasing pictures of minors. This included an advertisement labeled "Photos of Male High School Students", which allowed people to purchase photographs of high school boys playing during gym class that were taken with a "hidden camera", as well as "semi-nude" photos of high school boys swimming. There was also a half page advertisement for the Danish pederasty magazine Boy. Fritscher was against allowing anything endorsing or implying sexual activity with underage boys, and convinced Embry to drop the ads.

The magazine arranged yearly International Mr. Drummer contests in San Francisco from 1981 until it ceased publication in 1999. In 1982, Luke Daniel won both International Mr. Drummer and International Mr. Leather. On September 18, 1990, Clive Platman (Mr. Australia Drummer) presented Tony DeBlase with an Australian version of DeBlase's creation of the leather pride flag; this version incorporated the Southern Cross, which is from the Australian national flag, with the original design of the leather pride flag.

Fritscher's short-story collection Corporal in Charge of Taking Care of Captain O'Malley (Gay Sunshine Press, 1984) was the first collection of leather fiction, and the first collection of fiction from Drummer. The title entry Corporal in Charge was the only play published by editor Winston Leyland in the Lambda Literary Award winner Gay Roots: Twenty Years of Gay Sunshine - An Anthology of Gay History, Sex, Politics & Culture (1991).

The magazine was sold in 1986 to Tony DeBlase, who sold it in 1991 to Martijn Bakker, owner of RoB Amsterdam.

The last regular print issue of the magazine's original run – #214 – was published in April 1999. A complete set of this run is at the Leather Archives and Museum.

=== During publishing hiatus ===
Jack Fritscher's eyewitness recollections and interviews of Drummer history were published in 2007 as Gay Pioneers: How Drummer Magazine Shaped Gay Popular Culture 1965-1999.

In 2008 Drummer cofounder Jeanne Barney received the Lifetime Achievement Award as part of the Pantheon of Leather Awards.

A selection of Jack Fritscher's writing in Drummer was published in 2008 as Gay San Francisco: Eyewitness Drummer. This won the National Leather Association International’s Geoff Mains Nonfiction Book Award in 2009.

In 2014 and 2015 respectively Drummer cofounders John H. Embry and Jeanne Barney were inducted into the Leather Hall of Fame.

Drummer cofounder John H. Embry was honored in 2017 along with other notables, named on bronze bootprints, as part of San Francisco South of Market Leather History Alley.

=== Relaunch ===
Jack MacCullum, a titleholder in the D.N.A. ("Drummer North America") competitions, purchased the magazine and its associated events from Martijn Bakker in 2018, and relaunched it in October 2019 under editor Mike Miksche as a quarterly print and online publication. Jack Fritscher was a consulting editor on the first relaunch issue. The current editor in chief, Darkqwolf, was appointed 1 August 2023.

In 2025 the magazine was inducted into the Leather Hall of Fame.
