= Jacki Randall =

American cartoonist (born 1959)

- Born: 1959 (age 66–67); Los Angeles, California
- Occupations: Tattoo artist, cartoonist, writer, musician
- Website: jackirandall.com

Jacki Randall is an American cartoonist, tattoo artist, musician, and writer. Born in Los Angeles in 1959, Randall first garnered attention for her lesbian-focused cartoons in the Baltimore Gaypaper in 1981. Her comics have been featured in publications such as Gay Comics, The Baltimore Sun, On Our Backs, and Lesbian Connection. Randall is currently based in Baltimore, Maryland, where she works as a tattoo artist.

== Biography ==
Randall was born in Los Angeles, California, in 1959. While in high school, Randall worked at Hersheypark in Hershey, Pennsylvania, as a portrait artist. After graduating, Randall declined a scholarship from the York Academy of Art and decided to pursue work as a freelance artist and musician. In her work as a cartoonist, Randall's comic strips largely focus on lesbian themes and relationships, as well as leather and motorcycle culture. Randall's body of work has ranged from erotic paintings to commissioned artworks for churches and murals in Baltimore.

Since 1991, Randall has moved away from comics to work primarily as a tattoo artist, although she has published comic strips as recently as 1998. From 1994 to 2004, Randall worked at Sea Tramp Tattoo, Portland, Oregon's oldest tattoo parlor. In 2006, Randall and her partner moved to Baltimore, where she opened her own tattoo parlor, Charm City Tattoo.

== Published works ==
Randall's work as a cartoonist has been featured in the following publications:

- Illustrated the back cover of Women: A Journal of Liberation, Volume 8, Issue 13 (1983)
- "Dyke Dating Game" and "Angriest Dyke" in Gay Comix #14 (Winter 1991)
- "Fetishes" in Gay Comics #16 (Summer 1992)
- "I'm...," "Who's Flaunting What?" and "Terms of Endearment" in Gay Comics #18 (Spring 1993)
- "The REAL Meaning of: 'Lesbian Bed Death!"" and back cover illustrations in Brat Attack #4 (Summer/Fall 1993)
- "Devotion" in What is This Thing Called Sex?: Cartoons by Women, edited by Roz Warren (1993)
- "B.D.'s Day at the Mall" in Gay Comics #25 (Spring 1998)

Randall's comics have also been featured in many publications, including: the Baltimore Gaypaper, Lesbian Connection, Logomotion, Filth Monthly, The Spectator, Odyssey, On Our Backs, The Baltimore Sun, Calyx, Jewish Times, The Baltimore Afro-American, Amazon Times, Independent Biker, Tattoo, Tattoo Revue, Tabu Tattoo, Outlook, Skin Art, Skin & Ink, International Tattoo Art, Bad Attitude, and the Bay Area Reporter.

== Shows and exhibitions ==
- Harrisburg Museum of Art (1976)
- Louie's Cafe, Baltimore, Maryland
- National Cathedral College of Preachers
- "Kink: A Woman's Perspective," Leather Archives and Museum (1990)
- Maryland State House (1991)
- The Cartoon Shows, New York City (1993)
- Brown's Memorial Baptist Church, Baltimore, Maryland

== Interviews ==
- Tattoo Savage #11
- Outlaw Biker Tattoo Revue #60
- Tabu Tattoo #2
- JustOut, August 2004
- OutLoud, August 2004 and June 2008
- Electric City TV, San Francisco, 1991
- KBOOFM Portland, 1995
- BME/News, 2008

== Awards and recognition ==
Randall's work has been listed in the Michigan State University Special Library Collection as well as the Leather Archives & Museum in Chicago.

In 1991, Randall was awarded a special citation by Governor William Donald Schaffer.
