= Leather Archives & Museum =

Leather, kink, BDSM, and fetish museum in Chicago, Illinois

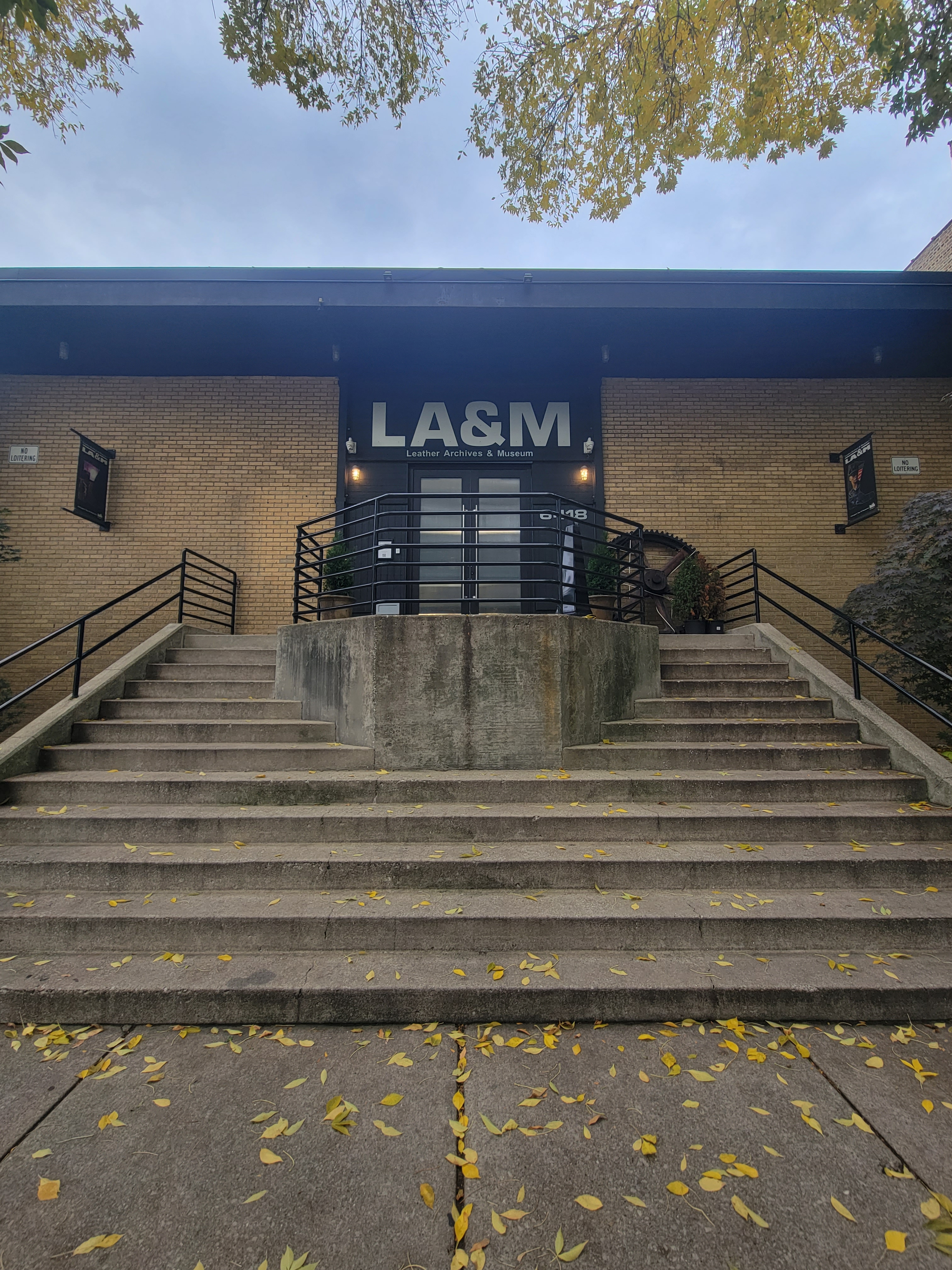
- LA&M entrance (2023)
- Established: September 18, 1991; 35 years ago
- Location: 6418 N Greenview Ave; Chicago, Illinois 60626; United States
- Coordinates: 41°59′55.06″N 87°40′5.93″W
- Founders: Chuck Renslow and Tony DeBlase
- Executive director: Gary Wasdin
- Website: leatherarchives.org

The Leather Archives & Museum (LA&M) is a community archives, library, and museum located in the Rogers Park neighborhood of Chicago, Illinois. Founded by Chuck Renslow and Tony DeBlase in 1991, its mission is making “leather, kink, BDSM, and fetish accessible through research, preservation, education and community engagement." Renslow and DeBlase founded the museum to combat the loss and suppression of leather and fetish community history during the AIDS crisis.

The LA&M is a leading conservator of queer erotic art. Its permanent collection features some of the most iconic LGBTQ artists of the twentieth century, including most artwork by Bill Schmeling and many works by Dom Orejudos.

The museum is open to patrons 18 years of age and over. It is a 501(c)(3) non-profit organization and a member of the Reciprocal Organization of Associated Museums (ROAM). Research assistance is available upon request.

The museum temporarily closed May 24, 2026 for a year-long renovation project.

== History ==
In 1991, Dom Orejudos, Chuck Renslow's partner of 40 years, died from AIDS-related complications. When Orejudos was alive, Renslow had begun selling off some of his art to pay for medical treatment, but upon his death, Renslow was determined to preserve Orejudos's art and legacy. Renslow was unable to find a museum willing to preserve Orejudos's entire body of work; although multiple museums expressed interest in his art, they wished to pick and choose specific artworks, whereas Renslow wished to keep the collection intact.

After consulting his friend Tony DeBlase, Renslow set about creating a new museum to preserve Orejudos's art and the legacy of the leather community. In Renslow's words, "we were in the thick of the AIDS epidemic and with each death, families and friends were unknowingly tossing our history into dumpsters. That there was a safe place to conserve that history simply made more sense." (According to former LA&M president Jon Krongaard, some families of AIDS victims intentionally erased their leather and fetish legacies because they found it "sick or perverse.")

The LA&M was incorporated in the State of Illinois in 1991. It held a ribbon cutting ceremony and its first public gallery show on November 4, 1995. Its first storefront was at 5013 N Clark Street, adjacent to Man’s Country bathhouse. As envisioned, the LA&M became a sanctuary for leather and fetish history and art; the scale of donated art and artifacts quickly overwhelmed the capacity of the Clark Street storefront.

Members of the leather and fetish communities played a pivotal role in establishing the museum. In addition to donating much of the collection, they provided crucial financial support. As the museum outgrew its storefront, Renslow and DeBlase identified a former synagogue on Greenview Ave ideal to house the growing collection. They could afford only $3,000 of the $60,000 down payment required to buy the Greenview Ave property, so they appealed to International Mr. Leather attendees, who raised $58,000 in donations in a single night. In 1999, the LA&M moved into the Greenview Ave building, in which it remains to this day. Over the next five years, the community raised the funds necessary to pay off the mortgage.

DeBlase served as Vice President of the Board of Directors of the LA&M from 1992 until 2000. In May 2006, the LA&M's executive director Rick Storer participated in a panel discussion entitled "Censorship & Sexually Explicit Materials" at the 2006 LGBTQ Archives, Libraries, Museums and Special Collections (ALMS) Conference.

In May 2009, the LA&M announced that International Mr. Leather proceeds would be placed in a trust to benefit the museum. The museum also receives funding from other leather events including Cleveland Leather Annual Weekend (CLAW) and Mid-Atlantic Leather Weekend (MAL) in D.C.

In 2016, the LA&M celebrated its 25th anniversary with a weekend-long celebration featuring Gayle Rubin and Guy Baldwin.

Since 2025, the museum has organized Chicago Leather Pride weekend, an annual three-day celebration of kink, fetish, and sexual identity.

LA&M temporarily closed May 24, 2026 for a year-long renovation project. The $2.2 million renovation includes the addition of dedicated research space, community event space, and ADA-compliant accessibility; it is scheduled to reopen in May 2027.

== Collection ==
It is estimated that just one percent of the museum's collection is on display at any given time.

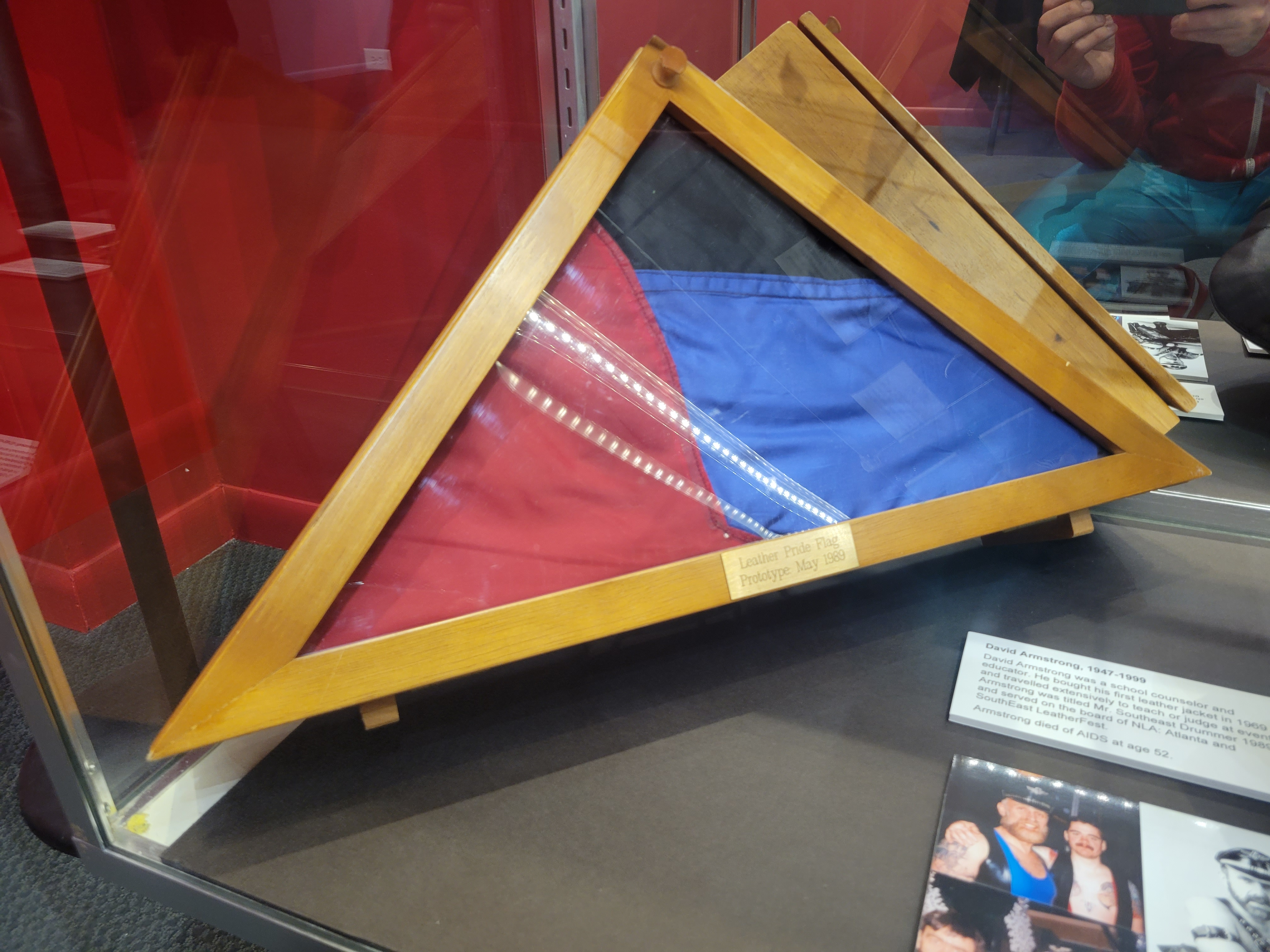
Original leather pride flag on display (2023)

=== Leather pride flag ===
The LA&M holds one of three original leather pride flags created by Tony DeBlase in 1989.

=== Drawings and illustrations ===
The LA&M has the world's largest collection of original work by Dom Orejudos (Etienne). In 2019, Bill Schmeling (the Hun) donated his entire personal collection of artwork and notes.

The museum also holds works by Chuck Arnett, Giacomo "Jack" Bozzi (Adam), Gerard Donelan, David Grieger, Beau Lee James, Charles Kerbs (MATT), Michael Kirwan, John Klamik (Sean), Touko Valio Laaksonen (Tom of Finland), Donald Merrick (Domino), Mike Miksche (Steve Masters), Olaf Odegaard, Jacki Randall, Rex, Al Shapiro (A. Jay), Joe T, Dennis Walsh, and Bill Ward.

One of the museum's largest paintings is The Last Supper In a Gay Leather Bar With Judas Giving Christ the Finger by Steven Brown, inspired by the artist's struggle to reconcile faith and sexuality.

=== Photography and videography ===
LA&M holds photographs by Kris Studios, a male physique photography studio founded by Renslow and Orejudos (named in part to honor transgender pioneer Christine Jorgensen). It also has photographs by Kenneth Anger, George Dureau, Efrain J. Gonzalez, Adam Kozik, Lochai, and Robert Mapplethorpe. LA&M's photos, videos, and oral histories chronicling International Mr. Leather and International Ms. Leather were featured in a 2015 documentary by Christina Court: High Shine: 15 Years of International Ms Bootblack.

=== Literature ===
LA&M holds complete sets of the magazines Drummer (original run) and Bound & Gagged. In 2009, the LA&M acquired the 25-box collection of papers of Robert Davolt, author and organizer of the San Francisco Pride leather contingent, and former editor of Bound & Gagged.

The collection includes records of leather and fetish organizations such as Chicago Hellfire Club, Conversio Virium, International Mr. Leather, Mid America Fists In Action (MAFIA), Mineshaft, MIR (formerly Mr. International Rubber), National Leather Association, and Society of Janus, as well as the papers of Tony DeBlase. Hundreds of oral history recordings, videos and transcripts by leather and fetish trailblazers such as Joe Laiacona (better known by his alias Jack Rinella) and Larry Townsend are also available to researchers.

=== Artifacts ===
The collection includes artifacts such as vests, patches and pins from LGBTQ motorcycle clubs and leather clubs around the world, including Centurions of Columbus, Crucible MC, Empire City MC, Rochester Rams MC, Stallions MC, and Wheels MC. LA&M also houses ephemera from historic gay establishments such as the Mineshaft and Chicago Eagle, including a glory hole from Man's Country.

LA&M holds hundreds of bootblacking artifacts, many from competitions such International Mr. Bootblack (IMBB), International Ms. Bootblack, and International Community Bootblack. These include IMBB 1994 William Shields, Jr.'s bootblacking kit, IMBB 2000 David Hawk's bootblacking chair, and a bootblacking chair used by Harry Shattuck and ‘Daddy’ William Shields, Jr. in gay bars in Chicago, Boston, Providence and New York City between the 1990s and 2000s.

Body modification artifacts in the collection include Cliff Raven's tattooing memorabilia; stories, artwork, and stencils by Samuel Steward; publications by Fakir Musafar; and photographs belonging to Sailor Sid Diller.

==== Gallery ====
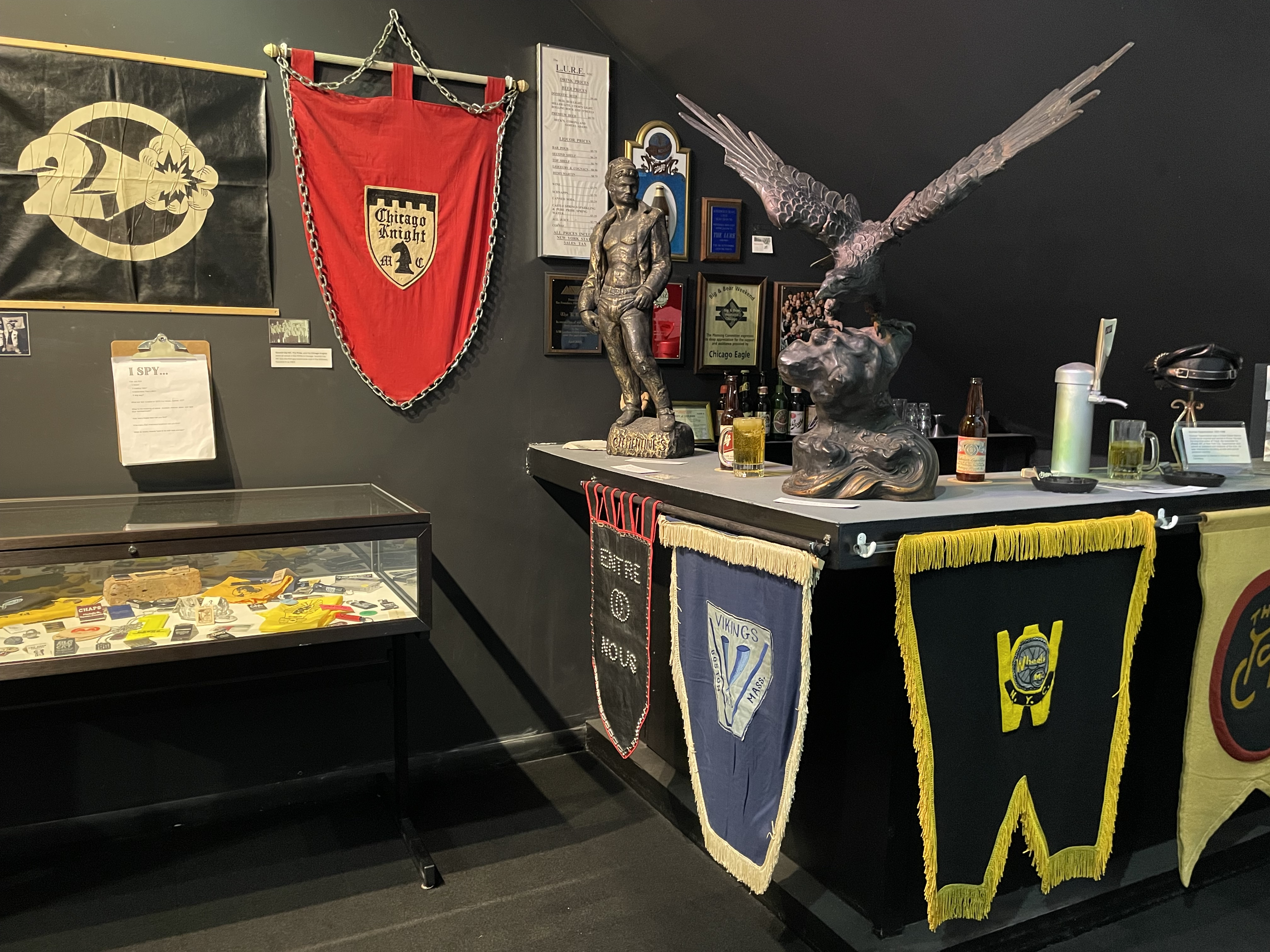
Artifacts on display (2024)

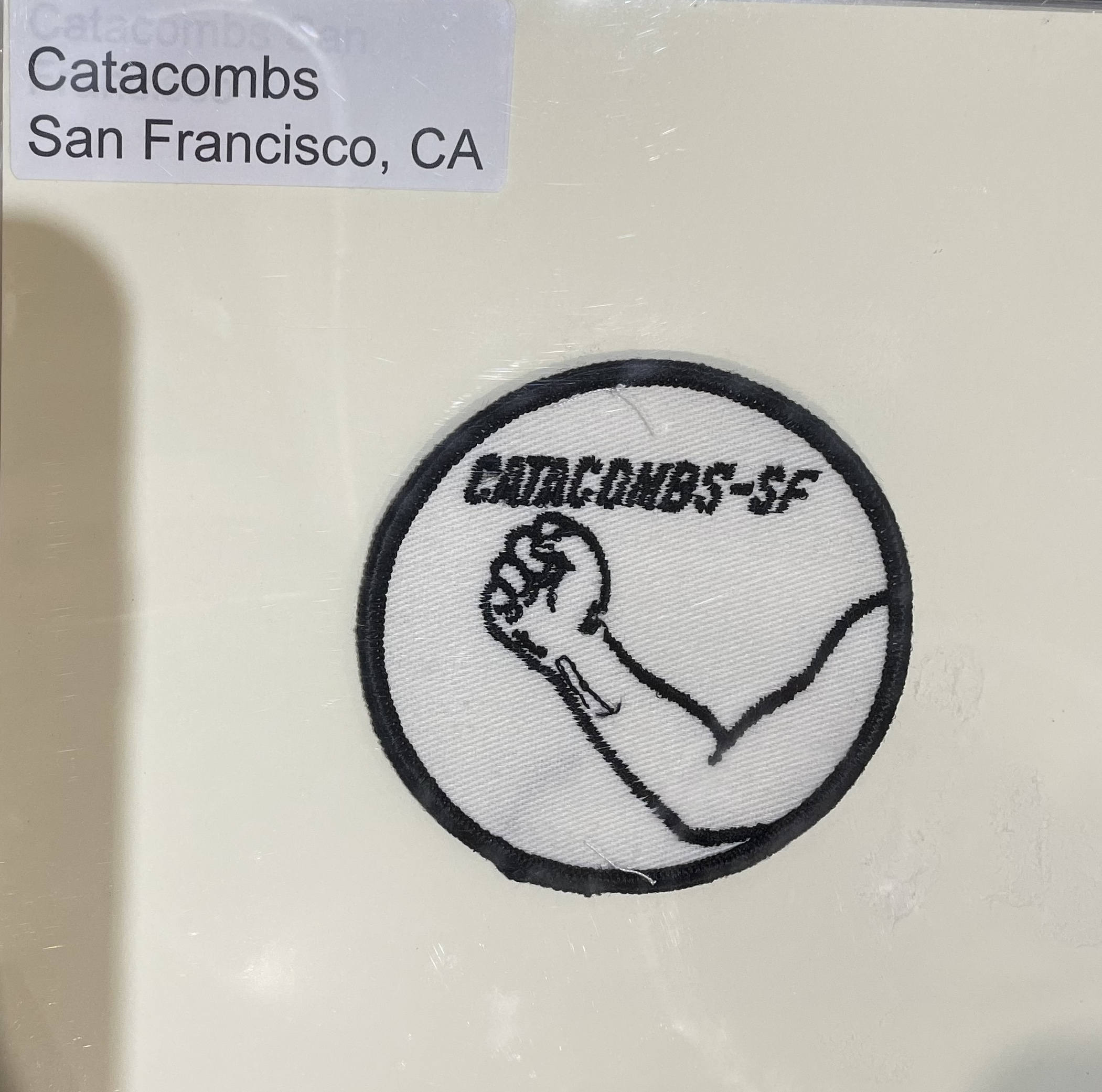
A patch for The Catacombs, a gay and lesbian S/M leather fisting club, from the museum’s collection

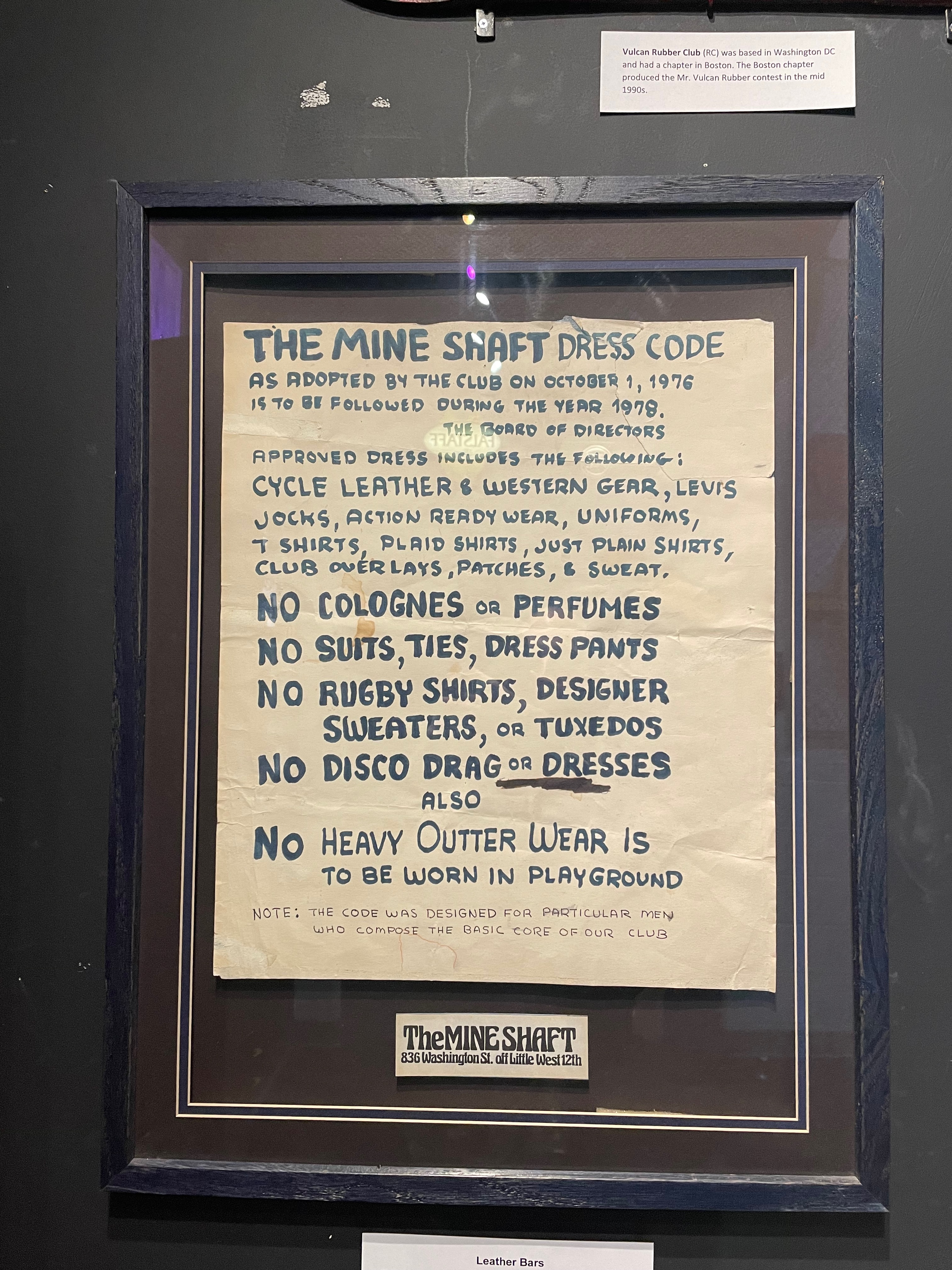
The Mineshaft’s dress code on display

== Facilities ==
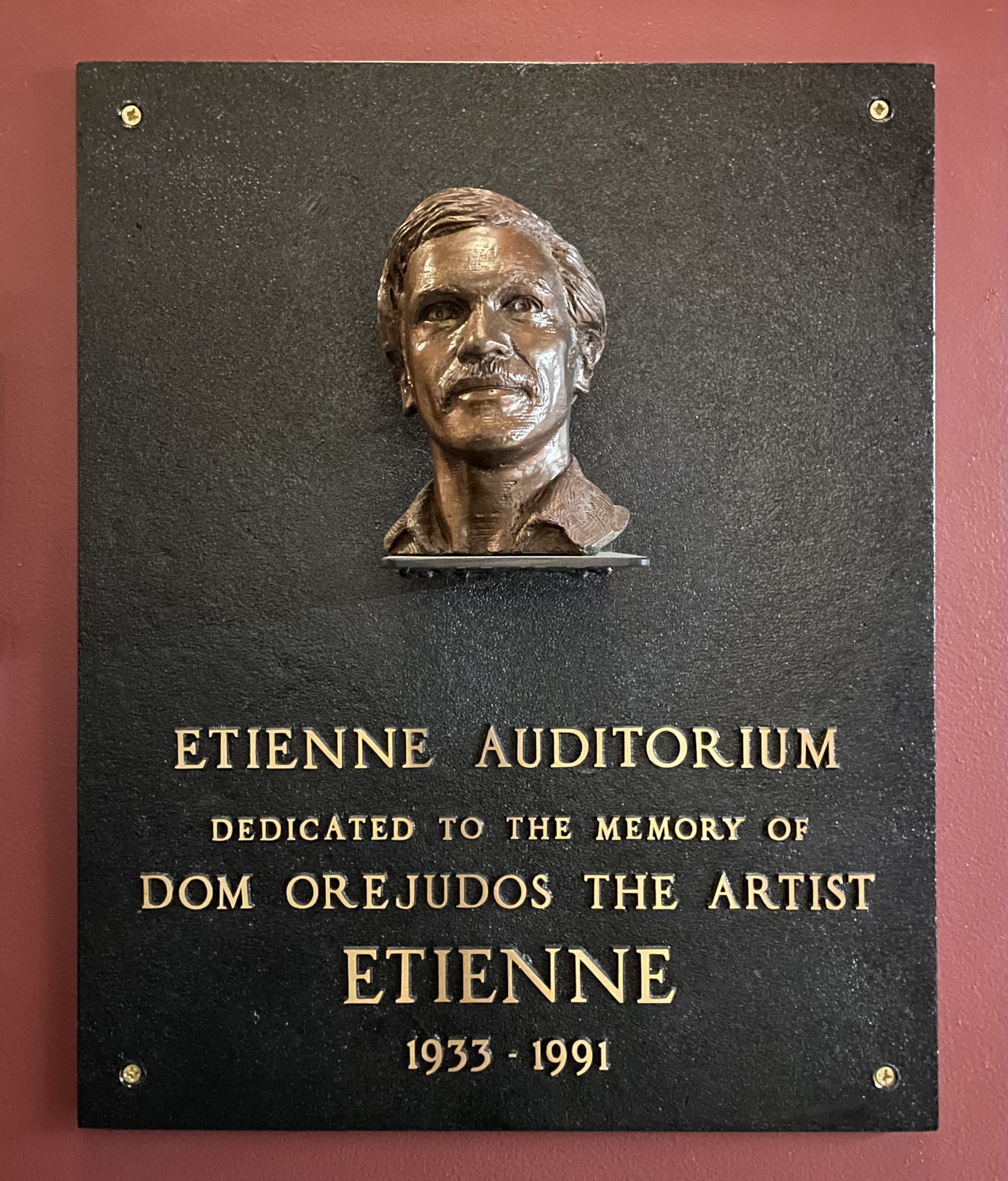
Etienne Auditorium plaque (2024)

=== Etienne Auditorium ===
The LA&M contains a 164-seat auditorium named in honor of Dom Orejudos (who signed his artwork under the alias Etienne); the auditorium is adorned with original Etienne artwork from the Gold Coast bar, Man's Country bathhouse, and elsewhere.

The auditorium is a hub for leather- and fetish-related events, community meetings, and lectures. The event space is available to rent for a fee, but is made available for free for small not-for-profit community group gatherings.

The auditorium is home to the LA&M's annual Fetish Film Forum.

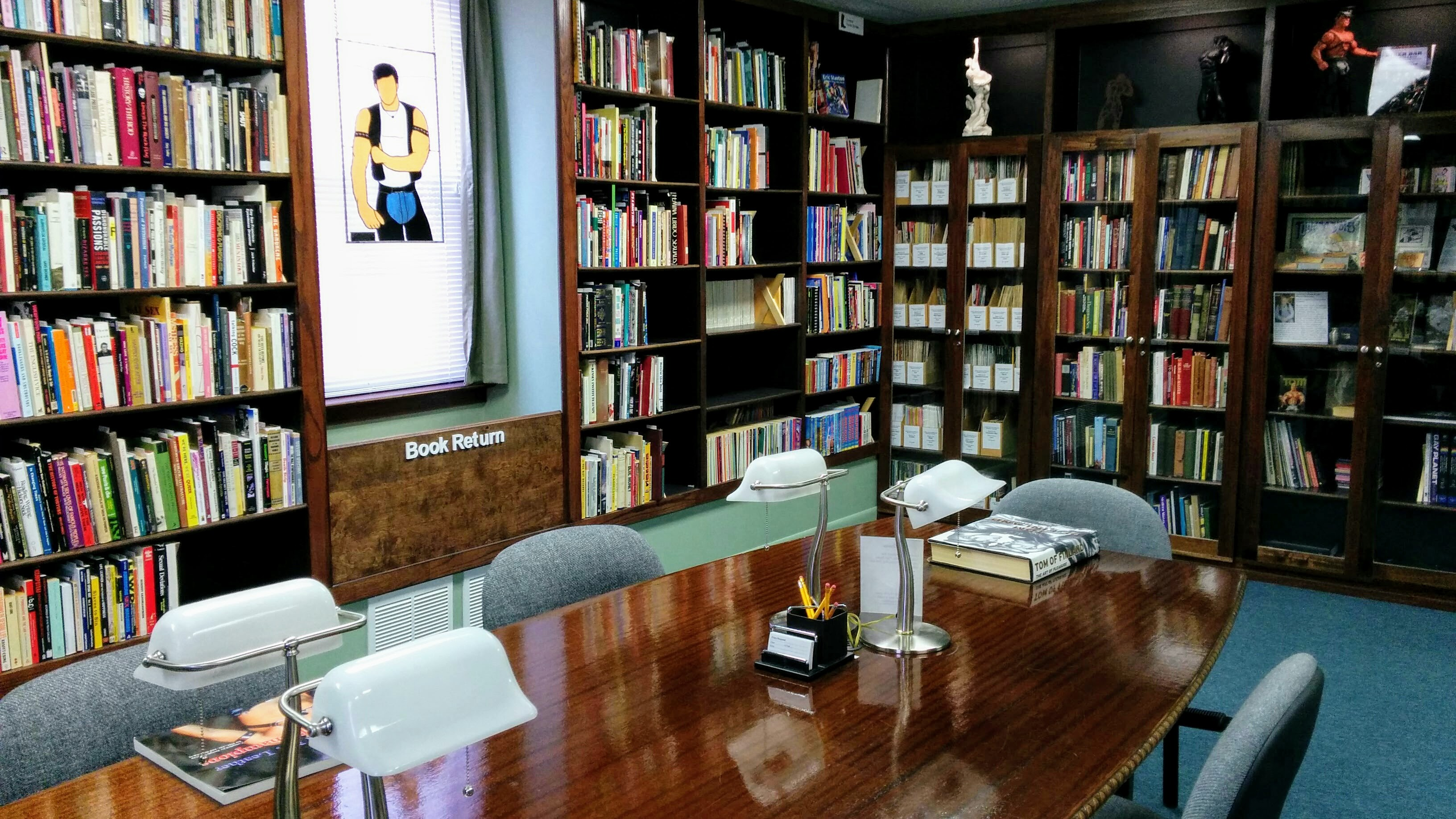
The Teri Rose Memorial Library (2015)

=== Teri Rose Memorial Library ===
The Teri Rose Memorial Library, opened in 2005, allows visitors and researchers free access to a wide variety of books, periodicals, and catalogs. The non-circulating library contains more than 5,000 books, 11,000 magazines (including Honcho, Mandate, and Mattachine Review), and 100 journals.

=== Gift shop ===
LA&M's gift shop sells vintage erotica, apparel, and a variety of merchandise, much of which features art by Etienne and the Hun. The gift shop has a small physical presence in the museum as well as an online store.

== Recognition ==
In 2016, Chicago City Council designated September 18, 2016 as "Leather Archives & Museum Day" in honor of the museum's 25th anniversary (Resolution R2016-704).

The LA&M was inducted into the Chicago LGBT Hall of Fame in 2017.

The LA&M has received numerous honors and awards from leather organizations, including:

- Pantheon of Leather Awards - Large Nonprofit Organization of the Year: 1997, 2001, 2006, and 2011.
- International Deaf Leather Recognition Award: 2011.
- Induction into Leather Hall of Fame: 2019.

LA&M leaders have also received numerous honors:

- Chuck Renslow, who died in 2017, is listed as the Chairman In Memoriam of the LA&M. The LA&M also gives out the Chuck Renslow President's Award to honor individuals and organizations for their contributions to the museum.
- Joseph Bean, while executive director of the LA&M, received the Man of the Year award as part of the Pantheon of Leather Awards in 1998 and 2000, and the Steve Maidhof Award for National or International Work from National Leather Association International in 1998.
- Rick Storer, while executive director of the LA&M, received the President's Award as part of the Pantheon of Leather Awards in 2005, the Man of the Year award as part of the Pantheon of Leather Awards in 2008, the Mr. Marcus Hernandez Lifetime Achievement Award (Man) as part of the Pantheon of Leather Awards in 2012, and the National Leather Association International Lifetime Achievement Award in 2015.

== Exhibits ==
Past and present exhibits include:

- Fakir Musafar (2016)
- A Room of Her Own (2016) - a chronicle of women's leather history
- Excavating Experience: The Presence of LGBTQ People of Color in Cook County, IL (2019)
- Verboten: Works by Rex (2021)
- The Golden Era: Leather, Levi and Motorcycle Clubs (2021)
- Sparks in a Dark Room by Gabriel Martinez (2023-2024)

In regard to the name of A Room of Her Own, curator Alex Warner wrote:

As I began work for the first exhibit installation of the Women's Leather History Project, I was excited that we were both literally and figuratively making room for Leatherwomen's history in the LA&M. It was out of this line of thinking that A Room of Her Own emerged, building on Virginia Woolf's 1929 feminist text A Room of One's Own that argues for women's need for space to think and create.

== See also ==
- Gerber/Hart Library and Archives
- ONE National Gay & Lesbian Archives
