= Larry Townsend =

American author (1930–2008)

- Born: Michael Lawrence Townsend; October 27, 1930
- Died: July 29, 2008 (aged 77); Los Angeles, California, U.S.

Larry Townsend (October 27, 1930 – July 29, 2008) was the American author of dozens of books, including Run, Little Leather Boy (1970) and The Leatherman's Handbook (1972), published by pioneer erotic presses such as Greenleaf Classics and the Other Traveler imprint of Olympia Press. Leatherman's Handbook, with illustrations by Sean, was among the first books to popularize BDSM and kink among the general public.

== Biography ==
Born Michael Lawrence Townsend, he grew up as a teenager in Los Angeles, where his neighbors included Noël Coward, Irene Dunne, and Laura Hope Crews. He attended the Peddie School and was stationed as Staff Sergeant in charge of NCOIC Operations of Air Intelligence Squadrons from 1950 through 1954 with the United States Air Force in Germany. Completing his tour of duty, he entered into the small, underground LA leather scene, where he and Montgomery Clift shared a lover.

With his degree in industrial psychology from UCLA (1957), he worked in the private sector and as a probation officer with the Forestry Service. He began his pioneering activism in the politics of homophile liberation in the early 1960s. During this time, he met Fred Yerkes (August 27, 1935 – July 8, 2006), who would become his companion of 43 years.

In 1972, as president of the 'Homophile Effort for Legal Protection', which had been founded in 1969 to defend gays during and after arrests, he led a group in founding the H.E.L.P. Newsletter, the forebear of Drummer Magazine (1975). He lived in the Silver Lake neighborhood of Los Angeles, the center of the Los Angeles leather scene (the equivalent of the SoMa neighborhood in San Francisco). As a writer and photographer, he was an essential eyewitness to the drama and salon around Drummer, which often excerpted his novels. Townsend's signature "Leather Notebook" column appeared in Drummer for twelve years beginning in 1980, and continued in Honcho until 2008. His last novel, TimeMasters, was published in April 2008. His last writing was Who Lit up the Lit of the Golden Age of Drummer, an introduction to Gay San Francisco: Eyewitness Drummer.

Townsend died on July 29, 2008, at Cedars-Sinai Medical Center in Los Angeles, at age 77. The cause of death was complications from pneumonia, according to family members.

An oral history recording featuring Townsend is housed at the Leather Archives & Museum in Chicago.

== Honors ==
In 1995, Townsend received the Steve Maidhof Award for National or International Work from the National Leather Association International.

In 2002, Townsend received the Forebear Award as part of the Pantheon of Leather Awards.

In 2016, Townsend was inducted into the Leather Hall of Fame.
