= Mike Miksche =

American artist Steve Masters (1925–1964)

Steve Masters
- Born: David Leo Miksche; 1925
- Died: 1964 (aged 38–39); New York City
- Other names: Mike Miksche, Steve Masters, Scott Masters
- Known for: Erotic illustration

Mike Miksche (1925–1964), widely known by his pen name Steve Masters, was an American artist active in the mid-twentieth century, known for his erotic illustrations.

== Biography ==
Born as "David Leo Miksche," Miksche was raised in Oregon but later relocated to New York City. He was of Czech ancestry and, having grown to a height of six foot three, became known for his formidable appearance.

Miksche enlisted in the United States Air Force, where he served as a flight captain. After completing his service, he became a fashion illustrator. In his professional life, Miksche drew advertising and commercial artwork for companies such as Sports Illustrated. He also modeled for Marlboro's "Marlboro Man" ad campaign.

In the 1950s and 1960s, Miksche created erotic art under the pen name Steve Masters (and reportedly Scott Masters as well). Miksche chose his pen name in part for its initials, SM, which were a coded indication of his sexual interest in sadomasochism (otherwise known as S&M). He depicted S&M in much of his art. His physique drawings and male nude drawings were featured in major gay publications such as Physique Pictorial and BIG Magazine.

Miksche's friend Glenway Wescott described him as "a giant Paul Bunyan type, very strong, with a magnificent physique [and a] tyrannous, psychological sadism... He wanted to dominate everybody... was a terrific performer... [and] a showoff."

Miksche met Alfred Kinsey in New York and guided him through the city's BDSM scene. Kinsey introduced Miksche to Samuel Steward, and the three agreed to allow Kinsey to film Miksche and Steward engage in S&M sex acts for his eponymous institute. Miksche and Steward's encounter was the first same-sex film shot by the Kinsey Institute.

Miksche was prone to violence; on at least one occasion, he broke a lover's ribs. According to Wescott, many in the S&M community feared Miksche. Kinsey came to regard Miksche dangerous and unstable.

Miksche died in 1964 after a long battle with depression. The cause of death is disputed. Miksche is reported to have committed suicide by jumping into the Hudson River. However, according to Wescott, Miksche was rescued from the river and died of a drug overdose on a rooftop. Whether this drug overdose was intentional or not is also disputed.

Following Miksche's death, much of his art was destroyed by his ex-wife. The Kinsey Institute and the Leather Archives & Museum hold most of Miksche's surviving art.

== Cultural impact & legacy ==
The Art of Steve Masters, a collection of Miksche's work, was published in octavo format circa 1970. In 1972, Greenleaf Editions featured Miksche in A Historic Collection of Gay Art, which was republished in 2006 by Arsenal Pulp Press as Gay Art: A Historic Collection. In 1986, his art was featured in Naked Eyes, an artist showcase organized by Olaf Odegaard that highlighted gay men's visual art for the International Gay and Lesbian Archives.

The Kinsey Institute and the Leather Archives & Museum hold most of Miksche's surviving art.

Jen Jackson Quintano, Miksche's great-niece, wrote of him:

He felt everything intensely, whether it be love or pain, curiosity or revulsion. And that made his life all the more remarkable. He felt his wounds acutely, and yet he did not sink into collapse; instead, he rose from it, time after time, open to beauty and cruelty in equal measure.

A Canadian sex columnist named James uses Mike Miksche as his pen name.

== See also ==
- Mike Miksche photo gallery by Jen Jackson Quintano
