= Jack Fritscher =

American writer

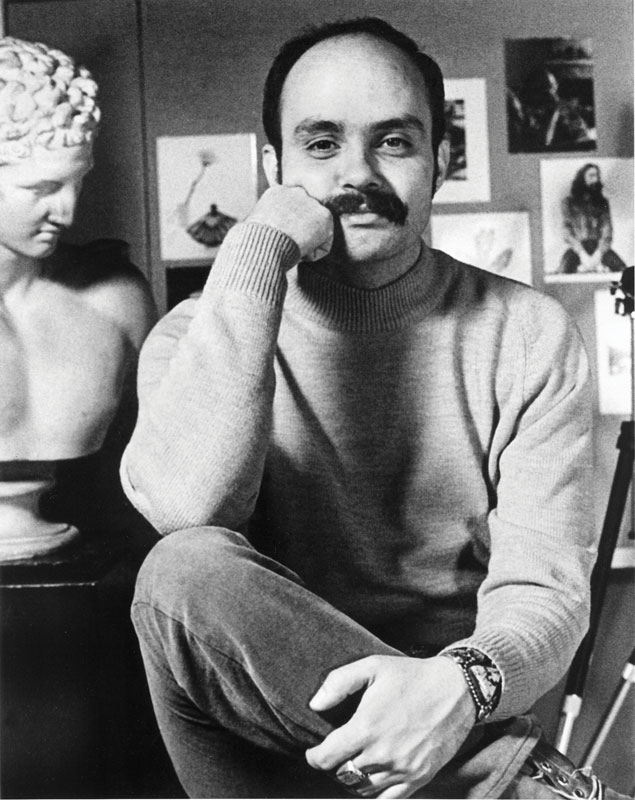
- Fritscher in 1972
- Born: John Joseph Fritscher; June 20, 1939 (age 87); Jacksonville, Illinois, United States
- Education: Pontifical College Josephinum; Loyola University Chicago
- Occupations: Writer; historian; professor; social activist
- Spouse: Mark Hemry
- Partner(s): Robert Mapplethorpe; David Sparrow
- Writing career
- Genres: Popular Culture; LGBT History; Literary fiction
- Movements: New Journalism; American Transcendentalism; American drama American film
- Website: jackfritscher.org

John Joseph Fritscher (born June 20, 1939) is an American author, university professor, historian, and social activist known internationally for his fiction, erotica, and nonfiction analyses of pop culture and gay male culture. An activist prior to the Stonewall riots, he was an out and founding member of the Journal of Popular Culture. Fritscher became highly influential as editor of Drummer magazine.

== Early life ==
Fritscher was born June 20, 1939, in Jacksonville and raised in Peoria, Illinois. His family was Catholic. Born during the Great Depression and growing up during World War II in rental housing, Fritscher was part of the gay generation who in their teens, during the 1950s, rebelled against conformity through the birth of pop culture and the Beats.

From a young age he was raised to believe he should be a priest. In 1953 at age 14, Fritscher attended the Pontifical College Josephinum, for both high school and college, studying Latin and Greek. He earned a degree in philosophy in 1961, followed by graduate work in theology and the Scholasticism of Thomas Aquinas (1961–1963). He was also schooled by Jesuits in the Humanism of Marsilio Ficino, Erasmus, and Jacques Maritain. While in school, Fritscher earned his first publication (1958) and the production of his first play (1959). He has said that while he was celibate at the seminary, "I probably became gay because of the Josephinum, although nothing happened (to me) there." In 1962 and 1963, inspired by French Worker-Priests and tutored by Saul Alinsky, Fritscher worked as a social activist on the South Side of Chicago. He was ordained by the Apostolic Delegate to the orders of porter, lector, exorcist, and acolyte.

In 1964, he entered Loyola University Chicago and completed his master's and doctoral program, writing a dissertation on Tennessee Williams entitled Love and Death in Tennessee Williams (1968).

== Academic life and writing ==
In 1961 Fritscher arrived in San Francisco and established a base there. Beginning in 1965, he taught at Loyola University Chicago, received tenure at Western Michigan University, and was a regular visiting lecturer at Kalamazoo College. From 1968 to 1975, he served on the board of directors of the Kalamazoo Institute of Arts where he founded and directed the museum film program. In 1969 he founded and taught the first film-as-literature courses at the Western Michigan University Department of English. In San Francisco in between academic posts, Fritscher used his academic credentials and publishing career in the Catholic press to find jobs as an editorial writer for KGO-ABC TV, as a technical writer for the San Francisco Muni Metro, and as manager of marketing at Kaiser Engineers, Inc. (1976–1982).

Fritscher has published both fiction and nonfiction. His first novel was What They Did to the Kid: Confessions of an Altar Boy (1965), and his first gay novel was I Am Curious (Leather) aka Leather Blues (1969). He authored the first book to investigate gay Wicca and witchcraft, Popular Witchcraft Straight from the Witch's Mouth (1972). His short-story collection Corporal in Charge of Taking Care of Captain O'Malley (Gay Sunshine Press, 1984) was the first collection of leather fiction, and the first collection of fiction from Drummer magazine. The title entry Corporal in Charge was the only play published by editor Winston Leyland in the Lambda Literary Award Winner Gay Roots: Twenty Years of Gay Sunshine - An Anthology of Gay History, Sex, Politics & Culture (1991).

Fritscher's academic writing has been published in the Bucknell Review, Modern Drama, Journal of Popular Culture, Censorship: A World Encyclopedia, and Playbill. His photographs have been published by Taschen, Rizzoli, Weidenfeld & Nicolson, St. Martin's Press, Gay Men's Press London, as well as by dozens of magazines, newspapers, and book publishers including his cover for James Purdy's Narrow Rooms (1996). His videos and photographs are in the permanent collections of the Maison européenne de la photographie, Paris; the Kinsey Institute for Research in Sex, Gender, and Reproduction; and the Leather Archives and Museum. He has appeared on The Oprah Winfrey Show and on BBC Channel 4 with Camille Paglia.

== Drummer magazine ==
Fritscher entered post-Stonewall gay publishing as founding San Francisco editor-in-chief of Drummer (March 1977 – December 1979), San Francisco's longest-running magazine (1975–1999). He was one of only two editors-in-chief in Drummer history. Fritscher was the magazine's most frequent contributor as editor, writer, and photographer through all three publishers, emerging as historian of the institutional memory of Drummer. While at Drummer, Fritscher introduced into gay media such artists as Robert Mapplethorpe and David Hurles (Old Reliable), and showcased talents such as Robert Opel, Arthur Tress, Samuel Steward (Phil Andros), Larry Townsend, John Preston, Wakefield Poole, Rex, and A. Jay.

As an analyst and framer of gay linguistics in the first post-Stonewall decade when gay journalists were inventing new words for the emerging gay culture, Fritscher coined the gay-identity word homomasculinity, as well as redefining S&M as "Sensuality and Mutuality" (1974). As such, he self-described as homomasculinist, which falls within the larger group of masculinist men. Documenting on page and on screen the dawn of the "Daddy" and "Bear" movements, Fritscher was the first writer and editor to feature "older men" (Drummer 24, September 1978) in the gay press.

Fritscher's eyewitness recollections and interviews of Drummer history was published in 2007 as GAY PIONEERS How Drummer Magazine Shaped Gay Popular Culture 1965–1999.

A selection of Fritscher's writing in Drummer was published in 2008 as Gay San Francisco: Eyewitness Drummer.

== Genre publishing ==
After leaving Drummer, Fritscher published eight quarterly issues of the raunchy gay zine Man2Man between 1980 and 1981. Primarily created on typewriter, under the slogans "What You're Looking For Is Looking for You" and "The Mag You Can Stick Your Nose In," issues ranged from 44 to 60 pages. Contents included uncensored and sometimes bizarre personal ads, readers' letters, artwork from Old Reliable, Rex, and others, interviews, pornographic fiction by Fritscher, ads by purveyors of erotic merchandise, and articles on such topics as "Clothes Harvesting" (stealing athletes' clothes from locker rooms), jockstraps, cigars, and other extreme fetishes. Mark Hemry is credited as publisher and graphic designer.

With California Action Guide, Fritscher became the first editor to refer to the gay "Bear" subculture on a magazine cover in November 1982.

Fritscher contributed to the start-up of dozens of other emerging gay magazines as well as booking anthologies for new publishers such as Gay Sunshine Press and Bowling Green University Press.

== Palm Drive Video ==
Together with producer Mark Hemry, Fritscher co-founded the pioneering Palm Drive Video in 1984, dedicated to homomasculine entertainment. Fritscher wrote, cast, and directed more than 150 fetish features for Palm Drive Video. The studio also produced documentary content of a wide range of street festivals and competitive events, including the first "Bear" contest (Pilsner Inn, February 1987).

The 2021 documentary film Raw! Uncut! Video! examines the output and influence of Fritscher and Hemry.

== Gay historian and cultural participant ==
As an eyewitness participant, Fritcher contributed an article on Chuck Arnett ("Artist Chuck Arnett: His Life/Our Times”), to editor Mark Thompson’s Leatherfolk: Radical Sex, People, Politics, and Practice. He was a frequent historical journalist for the Bay Area Reporter and Leather Times. In 1972, he was the first gay writer to unearth and interview Samuel Steward (Phil Andros); his Steward audiotapes were referenced in Justin Spring's biography of Steward, Secret Historian (2010). As a gay popular culture critic, Fritscher began collecting his extensive gay history archive in 1965.

Chris Nelson photographed Fritscher for Richard Bulger's original Bear magazine as well as for the photography book The Bear Cult, selected and introduced by Edward Lucie-Smith. As a writer and photographer, he contributed fiction and photographs for covers and interior layouts for Bear magazine and other Brush Creek Media magazines. He wrote the introduction to Les Wright's Bear Book II and contributed to Ron Suresha's Bears on Bears: Interviews & Discussions as well as to editor Mark Hemry's fiction anthology Tales of the Bear Cult. In addition to Chris Nelson, Fritscher has been photographed by Robert Mapplethorpe, Daniel Nicoletta, Arthur Tress, David Hurles, David Sparrow, Robert Opel and his nephew Robert Oppel, and Jim Tushinski.

== Personal life ==
Fritscher is married to Mark Hemry, founding owner of Palm Drive Publishing. The couple met May 22, 1979, the night after the White Night riots under the marquee of the Castro Theatre. Following a civil union in Vermont (July 12, 2000) and a Canadian marriage (August 19, 2003), they were married in California (June 20, 2008).

Fritscher's previous significant partners were David Sparrow and Robert Mapplethorpe.

Fritscher was portrayed by actor Anthony Michael Lopez in the 2018 biopic Mapplethorpe.

== Bibliography ==
=== Novels ===
- Fritscher, Jack (2005). Some Dance To Remember: A Memoir-novel Of San Francisco, 1970-1982. New York City, New York: Harrington Park Press. ISBN 1560233273.
- Fritscher, Jack (2002). What They Did to the Kid: Confessions of an Altar Boy, A Tale of Priest Abuse. San Francisco, California: Palm Drive Publishing. ISBN 1890834378.
- Fritscher, Jack (1984). Leather Blues: The Adventures of Denny Sargent, a Novel. San Francisco, California: Gay Sunshine Press. ISBN 0917342496.
- Fritscher, Jack (1998). The Geography of Women: A Romantic Comedy. San Francisco, California: Palm Drive Publishing. ISBN 1890834254.
- Fritscher, Jack (2012). Titanic: The Untold Tale of Gay Passengers and Crew. San Francisco, California: Palm Drive Publishing. ISBN 978-1890834081.

=== Nonfiction ===
- Fritscher, Jack (2010). Gay San Francisco: Eyewitness Drummer - A Memoir of the Sex, Art, Salon, Pop Culture War, and Gay History of Drummer Magazine - The Titanic 1970s to 1999. Vol. 1. Mark Hemry (Editor). San Francisco, California: Palm Drive Publishing. ISBN 9781890834395.
- Fritscher, Jack (1994). Mapplethorpe: Assault with a Deadly Camera: A Pop Culture Memoir-An Outlaw Reminiscence. New York City, New York: Hastings House Publishers. ISBN 0803893620.
- Fritscher, Jack (2004). Popular Witchcraft: Straight from the Witch's Mouth (2 ed.). University of Wisconsin Press/Popular Press. ISBN 0299203042.
- Fritscher, Jack (1971). Television Today. Mark J. Brummel, C.M.F., R.J. Liskowski, Tom Hogan. Chicago, IL: Claretian Fathers/Claretian Press.
- Fritscher, John (1968). "Love and Death in Tennessee Williams". Dissertations (Dissertation). Chicago, IL: Loyola University Library.
- Fritscher, John (1967). When Malory Met Arthur: Love and Death in Camelot (Doctoral Textual Qualification). Chicago, IL: Loyola University Library.

=== Anthology contributions ===
- Labonte, Richard (2010). Muscle Men: Rock Hard Gay Erotica (short story collection). Cleis Press. ISBN 978157344392-0.
- Leyland, Winston (1991). Gay Roots: Twenty Years of Gay Sunshine, An Anthology of Gay History, Sex, Politics, and Culture. San Francisco, California: Gay Sunshine Press. ISBN 978-0940567122.

== Awards ==
- 2020 - National Leather Association International: Samois Anthology Award for Mapplethorpe Movie
- 2020 – National Leather Association International: Cynthia Slater Non-Fiction Article Award for "Thom Gunn (1929-2004)"
- 2020 – National Leather Association International: Lifetime Achievement Award
- 2018 - National Leather Association International: Geoff Mains Nonfiction Book Award for Gay Pioneers: How Drummer Magazine Shaped Gay Popular Culture 1965-1999
- 2016 - National Leather Association International: Cynthia Slater Non-Fiction Article Award (award shared with Jaco Lourens) for “Conversations With Leather”
- 2014 - Pantheon of Leather Awards: Mr. Marcus Hernandez Lifetime Achievement Award (Man)
- 2010 - Pantheon of Leather Awards: Northern California Regional Award
- 2009 – National Leather Association International: Geoff Mains Non-Fiction Best Book Award for Gay San Francisco: Eyewitness Drummer Vol. 1
- 2009 – National Leather Association International: Cynthia Slater Non-Fiction Feature Article Award for "Spill a Drop for Lost Brothers: An Obituary for Larry Townsend"

== See also ==
- Mineshaft (gay club)
