= Durk Dehner =

Canadian businessman, film director and publisher (born 1949)

Durk Dehner (born May 23, 1949) is a Canadian businessman, film director and publisher who co-founded the culturally influential Tom of Finland Company, and later established the Tom of Finland Foundation dedicated to preserving, collecting, and exhibiting homoerotic art (including that of Tom of Finland), a registered historic landmark in Los Angeles, California, US.

== Personal life ==
Dehner was born on May 23, 1949, and raised in Alberta, Canada. His father was a farmer and his mother was the daughter of a doctor. Dehner was the youngest of three siblings. His parents stressed the importance of independence and self-reliance from an early age, and he often moved about his environment on his own, navigating his way through urban and natural settings with ease. At the age of 13, his parents gave him permission to begin practicing Transcendental Meditation. This daily meditation practice led Dehner to the belief that the solution to his "painful experience of self doubt" was to devote his life to other people. This was the beginning of his philosophical exploration and spiritual awakening.

He began visiting public areas, such as department store bathrooms, to view sexual situations as early as nine years old, and had his first sexual encounter at 11 with an 18-year-old male. Despite the age of his first partner, Dehner did not consider himself abused. Instead, he admits to seeking and enjoying sex with a variety of people throughout his youth.

Dehner fathered a son at age 16 with his then-girlfriend. Dehner recalled his parents being concerned, but non-judgmental about the situation. Dehner has multiple partners of both sexes and various ages throughout his youth. He and his friends would also gather for love ins, consisting of groups as large as 15 people. While his parents did stop these activities, Dehner recalls that they were not judgmental of them.

He learned to develop film at home, so he could develop erotic photography privately. A straight friend, whom he met at the Calgary Allied Arts Foundation, shot photos of Dehner in the woods and Dehner would develop the film in his basement. Dehner later posed for Bruce Weber. He studied fine arts at the University of Alberta, Edmonton, The Allied Arts Center in Calgary, and The Vancouver School of Fine Arts.

In 1976, Dehner met Dom Orejudos, who he later described as "my best friend for many years." Orejudos was a pen pal of Tom of Finland—both were gay erotic artists—and was responsible for introducing Dehner to Tom. In 1979, Dehner competed in the first International Mr. Leather competition, in which he placed second.

== Career ==
=== Tom of Finland Foundation ===
Dehner has worked in various jobs, including film direction, publishing, public relations and marketing, editing and production, photography, art collecting, public speaking writing, and event production. Dehner co-founded the Tom of Finland Foundation with Touko Laaksonen a.k.a. Tom of Finland in 1984. The foundation's original mission was to protect the artist's large collection of works. Later, the mission was enlarged to serve as an erotic art archive, which would protect such work from discrimination and destruction. The Foundation also focuses on promoting healthy, pro-sex attitudes and educating the public on the merit of erotic art. Dehner has taken a leadership role at the foundation since its inception.

He founded the Foundation to help promote the work of Laaksonen in the United States. He understood the effect that his work had on the LGBT community and how he affected the lives and styles of homosexual males. He also had noticed that Laaksonen's work been misused by publishers who reprinted his work without obtaining written permission. Therefore, he offered, as a token of their friendship, to assist Laaksonen in the promotion of his work in the states. In 1978, Dehner secured an exhibition of Laaksonen's work in New York where he met fellow artists Robert Mapplethorpe and Andy Warhol.

==== TOM House ====
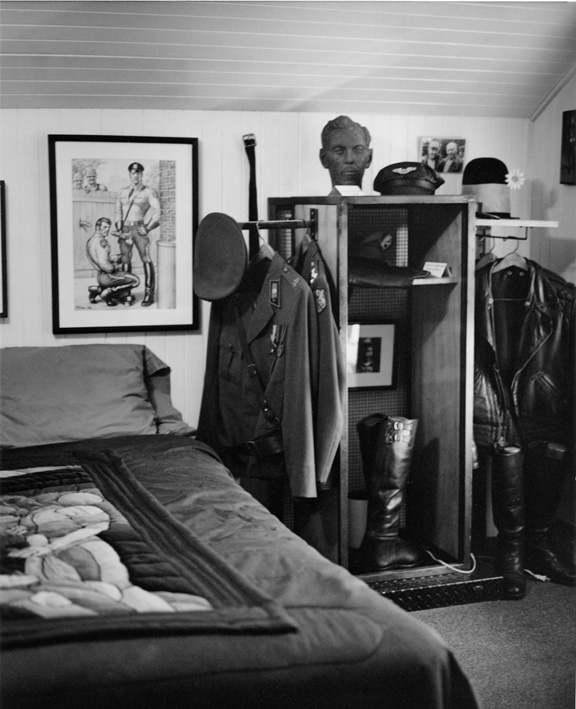
Tom of Finland's room at TOM House in Los Angeles (2002), photographed by Henning von Berg.

Dehner, along with administrators and volunteers, maintains the craftsman home in Echo Park, Los Angeles that houses the foundation, and was once home to Laaksonen during his final decade. Much of Laaksonen's original pieces are on display, while thousands of others are archived. To protect the space from development, Dehner submitted an application to the Los Angeles Cultural Heritage Commission asking it to make the house a historic monument due to its relation to Tom of Finland and the critical role it played in the LGBT rights movement. The Cultural Heritage Commission adopted the structure on November 23, 2016.

=== Nazi regalia scandal ===
In January 2025, International Mr. Leather, the world's oldest leather subculture conference and competition, removed Dehner as a judge following outcry after photographs of Dehner wearing Nazi regalia began circulating online. Dehner resigned as president of the Tom of Finland Foundation.

== Honors ==
In 2017, Dehner was inducted into the Leather Hall of Fame. In 2025, Dehner was asked to be a judge of that year's International Mr. Leather Contest. This honor was revoked after his history of wearing Nazi symbols came to light.
