= Tom of Finland =

Finnish artist (1920–1991)

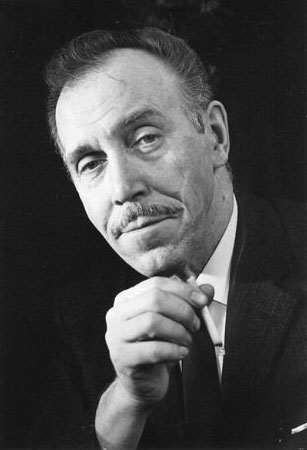
- Laaksonen c. 1959
- Born: Touko Valio Laaksonen; 8 May 1920; Kaarina, Finland
- Died: 7 November 1991 (aged 71); Helsinki, Finland
- Known for: Erotic illustration
- Partner: Veli "Nipa" Mäkinen (1953–1981)
- Awards: Puupäähattu Prize (The Finnish Comics Society, 1990)

Signature
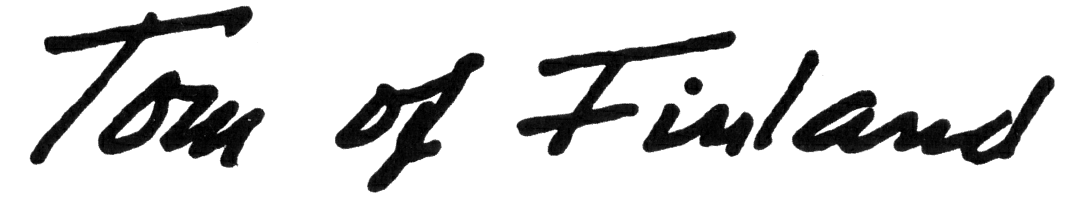
- Website: www.tomoffinland.org

Touko Valio Laaksonen (8 May 1920 – 7 November 1991), known by his pseudonym Tom of Finland, was a Finnish artist who made stylized erotic art featuring suggestively hypermasculine male characters. He worked primarily in pencil, producing drawings on paper and for publication in a variety of magazines and other formats. These works profoundly influenced late 20th-century gay culture and sexuality, their rise in popularity coinciding with gay law reform successes and the cultural and political emergence of LGBTQ+ communities from the 1960s onward. Tom of Finland has been called the "most influential creator of gay pornographic images" by cultural historian Joseph W. Slade. Over the course of four decades, he produced some 3,500 illustrations, mostly featuring men with exaggerated sexual traits, wearing tight or partially removed clothing. In 1984, he founded the Tom of Finland Foundation to preserve his catalogue of works and support erotic art generally; it continues to operate from TOM House in Los Angeles.

== Early life ==
Laaksonen was born on 8 May 1920 and raised by a middle-class family in Kaarina, a town in southwestern Finland, near the city of Turku. Both of his parents (Suoma and Edwin Laaksonen) were schoolteachers at the grammar school that served Kaarina. The family lived in the school building's attached living quarters.

He went to school in Turku and in 1939, at the age of 19, he moved to Helsinki to study advertising. In his spare time he also started drawing erotic images for his own pleasure, based on images of male laborers he had seen from an early age. At first he kept these drawings hidden, but then destroyed them "at least by the time I went to serve the army." Finland became embroiled in the Winter War with the Soviet Union, and then became formally involved in World War II, and he was conscripted in February 1940 into the Finnish Army. He served as an anti-aircraft officer, holding the rank of second lieutenant. He later attributed his fetishistic interest in uniformed men to encounters with men in army uniform, especially soldiers of the German Wehrmacht serving in Finland at that time. He said, "In my drawings I have no political statements to make, no ideology. I am thinking only about the picture itself. The whole Nazi philosophy, the racism and all that, is hateful to me, but of course I drew them anyway—they had the sexiest uniforms!" After the war, in 1945, he returned to studies.

Laaksonen's artwork of this period compared to later works is considered more romantic and softer with "gentle-featured shapes and forms". The men featured were middle-class, as opposed to the sailors, bikers, lumberjacks, construction workers, and other members of stereotypically hypermasculine working class groups that feature in his later work. Another key difference is the lack of dramatic compositions, self-assertive poses, muscular bodies, and "detached exotic settings" that his later work embodied.

== Career ==
A Tom of Finland drawing on the cover of a 1963 issue of Physique Pictorial.

In 1956 Laaksonen submitted drawings to the American magazine Physique Pictorial, which premiered the images in the 1957 Spring issue under the pseudonym Tom, as it resembled his given name Touko. In the Winter issue later that year, editor Bob Mizer coined the credit Tom of Finland. One of his pieces was featured on the Spring 1957 cover, depicting two log drivers at work with a third man watching them. Inspired by lumberjacks representing strong masculinity in Finnish culture, Laaksonen emphasized "homoerotic potentiality [...] relocating it in a gay context", a strategy repeated throughout his career.

The post-World War II era saw the rise of the biker subculture as rejecting "the reorganisation and normalisation of life after the war, with its conformist, settled lifestyle." Biker subculture was both marginal and oppositional, and provided postwar gay men with a stylised masculinity that included rebelliousness and danger. This was in contrast to the then-prevailing stereotypes of the gay man as effeminate (sissy), as seen in vaudeville and films going back to the first years of the industry. Laaksonen was influenced by images of bikers as well as artwork of George Quaintance and Etienne, among others, that he cited as his precursors, "disseminated to gay readership through homoerotic physique magazines" starting in 1950. Laaksonen's drawings of bikers and leathermen capitalized on the leather and denim outfits, which differentiated those men from mainstream culture and suggested they were untamed, physical, and self-empowered. This contrasted with the mainstream, medically and psychologically sad and sensitive young gay man who is passive. Laaksonen's drawings of this time "can be seen as consolidating an array of factors, styles and discourses already existing in the 1950s gay subcultures," which may have led to them being widely distributed and popularized within those cultures. He worked at an advertising agency in the 1960s.

=== U.S. censorship codes (1950s–1960s) ===
Laaksonen's style and content in the late 1950s and early 1960s was partly influenced by the U.S. censorship codes that restricted depiction of "overt homosexual acts". His work was published in the beefcake genre that began in the 1930s and predominantly featured photographs of attractive, muscular young men in athletic poses often shown demonstrating exercises. Their primary market was gay men, but because of the conservative and homophobic social culture of the era, gay pornography was illegal and the publications were typically presented as dedicated to physical fitness and health. They were often the only connection that closeted men had to their sexuality. By this time, however, Laaksonen was rendering private commissions, so more explicit work was produced but remained unpublished. Aside from his work at an advertising agency, Laaksonen operated a small mail-order business, distributing reproductions of his artwork around the world by post, though he did not generate much income this way.

In the 1962 case of MANual Enterprises v. Day the United States Supreme Court ruled that nude male photographs were not inherently obscene. Softcore gay pornography magazines and films featuring fully nude models, some of them tumescent, quickly appeared and the pretense of being about exercise and fitness was dropped as controls on pornography were reduced. By the end of the 1960s the market for beefcake magazines collapsed. Laaksonen was able to publish his more overtly erotic work and it changed the context with "new possibilities and conventions for displaying frontal male nudity in magazines and movies." Laaksonen reacted by publishing more explicit drawings and stylized his figures' fantastical aspects with exaggerated physical aspects, particularly their genitals and muscles. In the late 1960s he developed Kake, a recurring fictional character that appeared in 26 comics from 1968 to 1986.

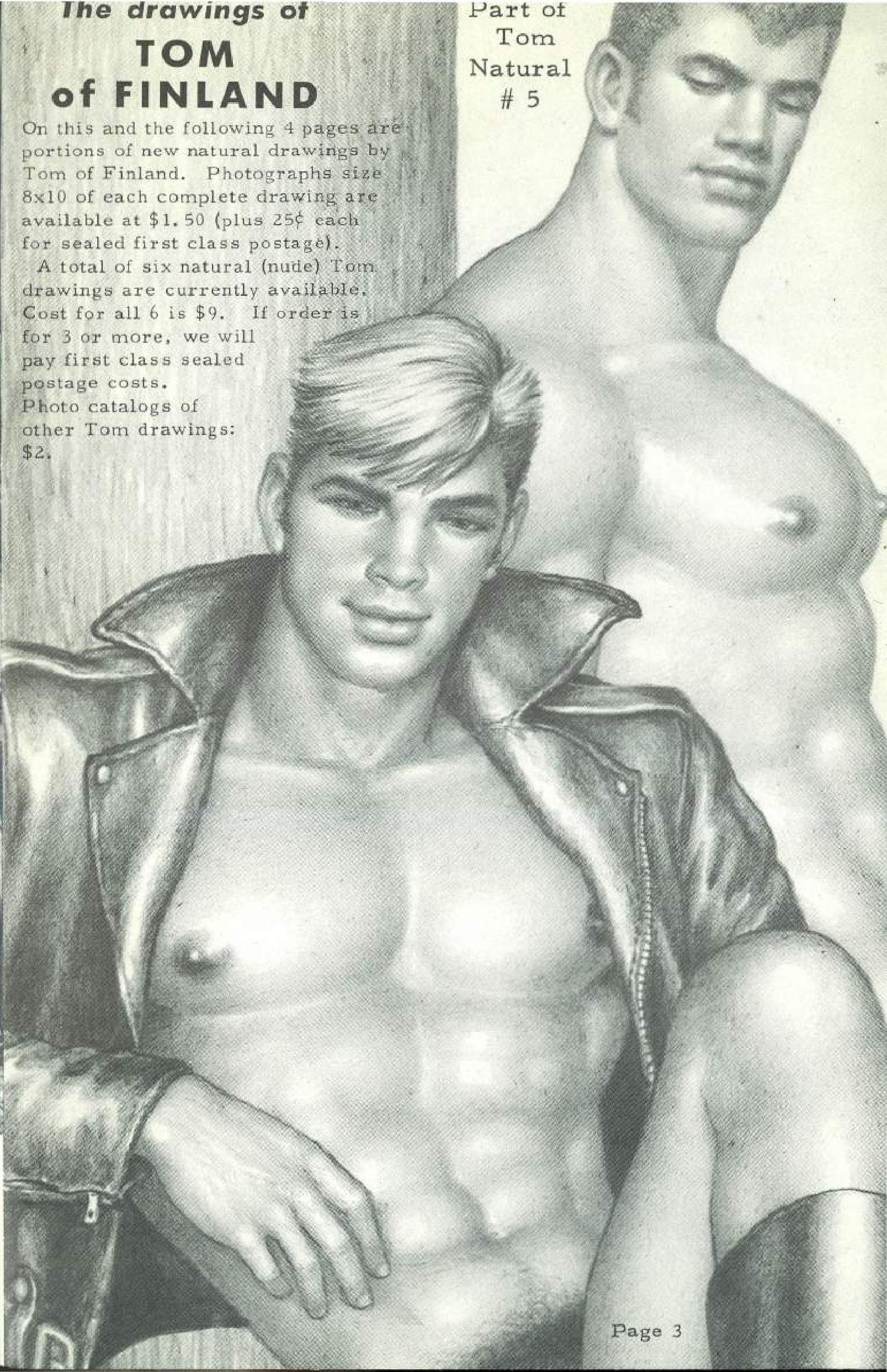
In gay magazines, Laaksonen's drawings were often cropped to be less explicit, as in this 1968 edition of Physique Pictorial. The caption notes that reproductions of the complete "natural (nude) Tom drawings" are for sale by mail order.

=== Gay mainstream appeal (1970s–1991) ===
With the decriminalization of male nudity, gay pornography became more mainstream in gay cultures, and Laaksonen's work along with it. By 1973, he was publishing erotic comic books and making inroads to the mainstream art world with exhibitions. In 1973 he gave up his full-time job at the Helsinki office of advertising agency McCann. "Since then I've lived in jeans and lived on my drawings," is how he described the lifestyle transition which occurred during this period.

By the mid-1970s he was also emphasizing a photorealistic style, making aspects of the drawings appear more photographic. Many of his drawings are based on photographs, but none are exact reproductions of them. The photographic inspiration is used, on the one hand, to create lifelike, almost moving images, with convincing and active postures and gestures while Laaksonen exaggerates physical features and presents his ideal of masculine beauty and sexual allure, combining realism with fantasy. In Daddy and the Muscle Academy – The Art, Life, and Times of Tom of Finland examples of photographs and the drawings based upon them are shown side by side. Although he considered the photographs to be merely reference tools for his drawings, contemporary art students have seen them as complete works of art that stand on their own.

In 1979, Laaksonen, with businessman and friend Durk Dehner, co-founded the Tom of Finland Company to preserve the copyright on his art, which had been widely pirated. Tom was introduced to Dehner by his pen pal and fellow erotic artist Dom Orejudos. Also in 1979, Laaksonen and Lou Thomas (a co-founder of Colt Studio) published Target by Tom; The Natural Man, a series of photographs and drawings of adult performers including Bruno, Jeremy Brent, Chuck Gatlin, and Steve Sartori.

In 1984 the Tom of Finland Foundation was established to collect, preserve and exhibit androerotic art. Although Laaksonen was quite successful at this point, with his biography on the best-seller list, and Benedikt Taschen, the world's largest art book publisher, reprinting and expanding a monograph of his works, he was most proud of the Foundation. The scope of the organization expanded to erotic works of all types, sponsored contests, exhibits, and started the groundwork for a museum of erotic art.

Laaksonen developed a "wonderfully rich relationship" with artist Bill Schmeling during the 1980s when they each lived in Los Angeles; the two men set up artist salons in their homes and shared artistic practices as well as life experiences. Schmeling cited Laaksonen as having considerably influenced his artistic style.

== Personal life ==
Laaksonen's romantic partner was the dancer Veli "Nipa" Mäkinen, with whom he shared his life for 28 years, until Mäkinen's death in 1981.

Laaksonen was diagnosed with emphysema in 1988. Eventually the disease and medication caused his hands to tremble, leading him to switch media from pencil to pastel. He died in 1991 of an emphysema-induced stroke.

== Reception ==
When examining the reception of Laaksonen's art, it is impossible to separate it from its original purpose. His "dirty drawings", as he himself called them, served primarily as gay erotica, intended to arouse the viewer. As described by Rob Meijer, owner of a leathershop and art gallery in Amsterdam, "These works are not conversation pieces, they're masturbation pieces." Many of his drawings were published in publications like Physique Pictorial, or were part of advertisements, decorations, and murals for male bath houses, leather bars and clubs—namely, for erotically charged or explicitly sexual spaces.

They also contributed to the spread of a new gay masculinity and confidence. In oral histories, for example, the works of Laaksonen are repeatedly described as influential in people's own sexual biographies. Many gay men were attracted to or identified personally with his characters, who were pictured as masculine, virile and often blue-collar, thus defeating homophobic stereotypes of effeminacy. Kate Wolf writes that "Tom of Finland helped pave the way to gay liberation".

Laaksonen's drawings were particularly popular in the flourishing leather subculture of the 1950s to 1970s. Tom's drawings were central to the development and dissemination of a more unified gay leather aesthetic, resulting in the so-called "clone look" of the 1970s and 1980s.

During his lifetime and beyond, Laaksonen's work has drawn both admiration and disdain from different quarters of the artistic community. Laaksonen developed a friendship with gay photographer Robert Mapplethorpe, whose work depicting sado-masochism and fetish iconography was also subject to controversy.

A controversial theme in his drawings was the erotic treatment of men in Nazi uniforms. They form a small part of his overall work, but the typically flattering visual treatment of these characters has led some viewers to infer sympathy or affinity for Nazism, and they have been omitted from most recent anthologies of his work. Laaksonen depicted a significant number of black men in his drawings and was at pains to dissociate himself and his work from fascist or racist ideologies. Laaksonen decried "the Nazi philosophy, the racism, and all the rest", but added "Of course I still drew them. They had the sexiest uniforms!"

Sheila Jeffreys offers a radical feminist critique of Laaksonen's work in her 2003 book Unpacking Queer Politics. Art critics have mixed views about Laaksonen's work. His detailed drawing technique has led to him being described as a "master with a pencil", while in contrast a reviewer for Dutch newspaper Het Parool described his work as "illustrative but without expressivity". Writing for Artforum, Kevin Killian said that seeing Tom of Finland originals "produces a strong respect for his nimble, witty creation".

== Cultural impact ==
In 2006, historian Jack Fritscher wrote:

If there is a gay Mount Rushmore of four great pioneer pop artists, the faces would be Chuck Arnett, Etienne, A. Jay, and Tom of Finland.

Laaksonen's artwork inspired numerous other artists to explore explicit sexuality in their own art, and some (like MATT) dedicated works of art in his memory. In 2019, the Los Angeles Times reported:

Tom’s cocksure leather look—a breakout sultry aesthetic dating to the 1950s—captured the early attention of artists such as Robert Mapplethorpe, Raymond Pettibon and Mike Kelley. It also influenced fashion and music: designers Jean-Paul Gaultier and Thierry Mugler and Queen’s Freddie Mercury. Today, Finland embraces its artist-son as a national hero, one backed by plenty of online merch—as diverse as sex toys and holiday ornaments. Tom’s bevy of built rogues, always affable and forever awash in unapologetic lust, has indeed aged well.

== Institutional and artistic legacy ==
=== Tom of Finland Company ===
Laaksonen and Dehner established the Tom of Finland Company in 1978 to oversee the publication of Laaksonen's work and to combat copyright infringement. In 1995, Tom of Finland Clothing Company introduced a fashion line based on his works, which covers a wide array of looks besides the typified cutoff-jeans-and-jacket style of his drawings. The fashion line balances the original androeroticism of the drawings with mainstream fashion culture, and their runway shows occur in many of the venues during the same times as other fashion companies.

=== Tom of Finland Foundation ===
Laaksonen and Dehner founded the nonprofit Tom of Finland Foundation (ToFF) in 1984 to preserve Laaksonen's catalog of work. After several years, they broadened ToFF's mission to "offer a safe haven for all erotic art." ToFF holds the world's largest collection of Laaksonen art (about 1,500 works) as well as one of the world's largest collections of erotic art generally (more than 100,000 images of materials).

ToFF holds an annual competition for emerging artists to exhibit their work for publicity and awards. The foundation also hosts social events to fundraise and provide opportunity for like-minded fans of erotic art to meet, including the annual, two-day Tom of Finland Art and Culture Festival.

ToFF's Erotic Artist Hall of Fame has recognized exemplary erotic artists, including H. R. Giger, Bill Schmeling, and Rex.

ToFF derives some income from its public programming and by licensing Laaksonen's images and name for commercial use, but it depends on donations and membership dues. ToFF is a separate entity distinct from the Tom of Finland Company, although the latter does provide the foundation with financial support.

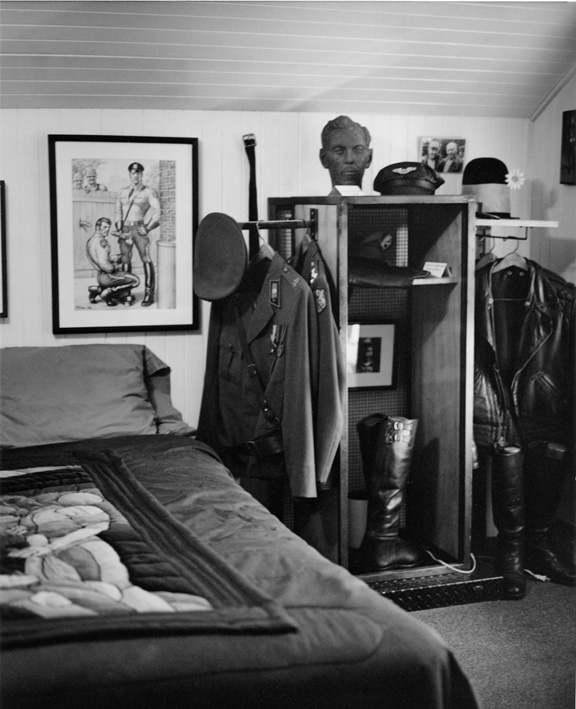
Tom of Finland's room at TOM House in Los Angeles (2002), photographed by Henning von Berg

==== TOM House ====
ToFF was previously headquartered at TOM House, a Victorian-style home at 1421 Laveta Terrace in Echo Park, Los Angeles, owned by Dehner at which Laaksonen lived for about a decade in his final years and where he created about 800 artworks (20% of his body of work). Laaksonen stayed for six-months at a time due to the restrictions on his visa. His bedroom in the attic has been preserved in much the same state as when he resided there before his 1991 death. The 14-room home is filled with erotic art (even the ceilings are covered in it). Other amenities include a basement dungeon (open by invitation only) and a "Pleasure Park" of sloped terraces and sitting areas in the backyard.

ToFF offers tours of the house by appointment. The home also hosts public events, including nude life drawing sessions. The Los Angeles City Council designated the house a Historic-Cultural Monument in 2016.

As of 2025, in light of California Department of Forestry and Fire Protection's updated Fire Hazard Severity Zone (FHSZ) map, ToFF plans to relocate the organization elsewhere in Los Angeles in an effort to safeguard its collection. ToFF chief executive officer Edward Cella has commented that the TOM House "was never designed to hold more than 8,000 historic LGBTQ+ artworks, more than 400 linear feet of historic archives, a reference library of more than 3,500 books..." A Facilities Task Force is leading this effort.

== Art collections and exhibitions ==
In 2009, Laaksonen was inducted into the Leather Hall of Fame. Some of his original works are at the Leather Archives & Museum in Chicago.

New York's Museum of Modern Art has acquired several examples of Laaksonen's artwork for its permanent collection. In 2006, MoMA in New York accepted five Tom of Finland drawings as part of a much larger gift from The Judith Rothschild Foundation. The trustee of The Judith Rothschild Foundation, Harvey S. Shipley Miller, said, "Tom of Finland is one of the five most influential artists of the twentieth century. As an artist he was superb, as an influence he was transcendent." Hudson, of Feature Inc., New York, placed Tom of Finland's work in the collections of Rhode Island School of Design Museum of Art and Art Institute of Chicago. His work is also in the public Collections of: The Museum of Contemporary Art (MOCA), Los Angeles, USA; Wäinö Aaltonen Museum of Art; Turku, Finland; University of California Berkeley Art Museum, Berkeley (California), USA; Los Angeles County Museum of Art, Los Angeles, USA; Kiasma, Museum of Contemporary Art, Helsinki, Finland; San Francisco Museum of Modern Art, San Francisco, USA; and Tom of Finland Foundation, Los Angeles, USA.

In 1999, an exhibition took place at the Institut Culturel Finlandais (Finnish Cultural Centre) in Paris.

In 2011 there was a large retrospective exhibition of Laaksonen's artwork in Turku, Finland. The exhibition was one of the official events in Turku's European Capital of Culture programme.

In 2012, Kulturhuset presented a retrospective, Tom of Finland, in Stockholm, Sweden; and Tom of Finland's work was in the Robert Rauschenberg Foundation's We the People in New York City, USA.

In 2013, MOCA presented Bob Mizer & Tom of Finland in Los Angeles, USA. The artist's work was also seen in HAPPY BIRTHDAY Galerie Perrotin – 25 years in Lille, France; Leslie Lohman Museum's Rare and Raw in New York City, USA; and the Institute of Contemporary Art's Keep Your Timber Limber (Works on Paper) in London, England.

In 2015, Artists Space presented the exhibition "Tom of Finland: The Pleasure of Play" in New York City, USA. The exhibition was also presented in Kunsthalle Helsinki in 2016, complemented with additional material such as photos from family albums.

In 2020, as part of the 100th birthday celebrations, "Tom of Finland: Love and Liberation" at London's House of Illustration showed 40 originals with ephemera emphasizing fashion as an aspect of his work.

== Film ==
In 1991, Filmitakomo and Yleisradio produced a documentary film, Daddy and the Muscle Academy, directed by Ilppo Pohjola. By the late 1980s, Laaksonen was well known in the gay world, but his "pneumatically muscled, meticulously rendered monster-donged icons of masculinity" received mainstream attention when the film—which includes hundreds of images of his work along with interviews—was released theatrically in Finland, won a Finnish Jussi Award in 1992, and was shown at film festivals and film art houses worldwide. While praising the artwork's quality, one critic noted the problems inherent in the film's lauding of Laaksonen as a gay pride icon while ignoring his work's "resemblance to both S & M pornography and Fascist art", which she tied to Laaksonen's early sexual experiences with German soldiers during World War II.

Filmmaker Wes Hurley credits Tom of Finland as an influence in his work, including his short Peter and the Wolf and his cult comedy musical Waxie Moon in Fallen Jewel.

Variety announced in 2013 that Finnish director Dome Karukoski was set to make a biopic of Laaksonen, entitled Tom of Finland. Helsinki-filmi produced it and secured exclusive rights. The film, released in February 2017 in Finland, is the first biopic of the artist.

== Postage stamps ==
In September 2014 the Finnish postal service, Itella Posti, published a set of three first class stamps featuring drawings by Laaksonen and in association with the stamps' release exhibited some of his correspondence at the Finnish Postal Museum. Two of the stamps include portions of an illustration of a nude man sitting between the legs of another man dressed as a police officer; the other depicts nude buttocks with a man's face included between the thighs. The stamp set exceeded Posti's expectations, with pre-orders from 178 countries, making it the best-selling stamp set in the service's history.

== See also ==
- Bara (genre)
- ONE National Gay & Lesbian Archives
- Off Sunset Festival

== Videography ==
- Ilppo Pohjola (author): Kari Paljakka and Alvaro Pardo (producers): Daddy and the Muscle Academy: Tom of Finland. Filmitakomo & YLE, Finland 1991. (Duration of Feature: 58 Minutes. Also features frames of Laaksonen's graphic art.)
