= The Leather Stallion Saloon =

Gay leather bar in Cleveland, Ohio

- Interactive map of The Leather Stallion Saloon
- Address: Cleveland, Ohio; U.S.
- Coordinates: 41°30′35.7″N 81°40′43.5″W
- Type: Gay bar

Construction
- Opened: 1970

The Leather Stallion Saloon is a gay leather bar in Cleveland, Ohio. Opened in 1970, it is Ohio's longest continuously operating gay bar and the oldest gay bar in Cleveland.

== Description and history ==
The Leather Stallion, established in January 1970, contains a bar and pool room decorated with "pictures of well-built men in jeans and cowboy hats, but without shirts," as well as a private patio with picnic tables. When it first opened, the Stallion was a private membership club catering to the gay Levi and leather subculture and acting as host bar to motorcycle clubs like the Leather Stallions and the Rangers. Dress code and membership were gradually relaxed over the following decades, with women allowed beginning in the late 1980s.

The Leather Stallion was purchased by current owner Ken Myers in 2014 and now hosts themed nights, community groups and events, and fundraisers throughout the year, in support of both the leather community and the broader LGBTQ+ community. The Stallion is also an event host and sponsor for CLAW (Cleveland Leather Annual Weekend), a leather convention and fundraiser held annually in Cleveland since 2002.

== See also ==
- List of LGBTQ bars
