= Folsom Street =

Street in California, U.S.

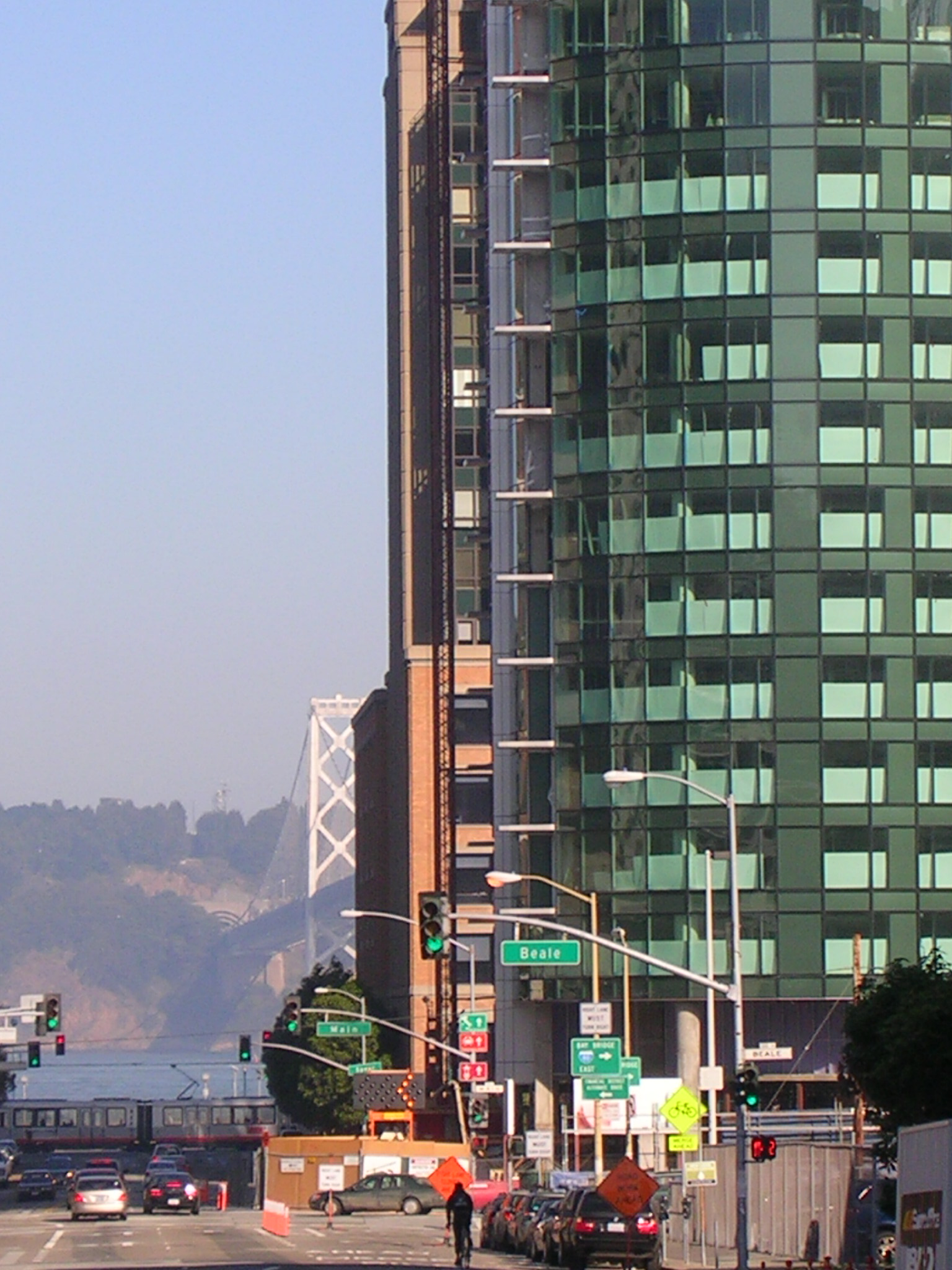
- Folsom Street in Downtown San Francisco.
- Interactive map of Folsom Street
- Location: San Francisco, California
- South end: Alemany Boulevard in Bernal Heights
- North end: The Embarcadero

Folsom Street is a street in San Francisco which begins perpendicular to Alemany Boulevard in San Francisco's Bernal Heights district and ends perpendicular to the Embarcadero on the San Francisco Bay. For its southern half, Folsom Street runs north–south, but it turns northeasterly at 13th street. It runs through San Francisco's Bernal Heights district, Mission District, SoMa District, Yerba Buena District, and South Beach district.

When the Stud, along with Febe's, opened up on Folsom Street in 1966, other gay leather bars and establishments catering to this subculture followed, creating a foundation for the growing gay leather community.

Since 1984, the street has been home to the Folsom Street Fair, an annual BDSM and leather subculture street fair held in September in the South of Market portion of Folsom Street, which, from approximately 1975–84, was the center of San Francisco's gay and lesbian BDSM community.

In 2008 and 2012, Folsom Street Events received the Large Nonprofit Organization of the Year award as part of the Pantheon of Leather Awards. However, in 2012 it tied with Cleveland Leather Annual Weekend. Then in 2015, Folsom Street Events received the Nonprofit Organization of the Year award as part of the Pantheon of Leather Awards.

The San Francisco South of Market Leather History Alley consists of four works of art along Ringold Alley honoring leather culture; it opened in 2017. One of the works of art is metal bootprints along the curb which honor 28 people (including Alan Selby, founder of the store Mr. S Leather and known as the "Mayor of Folsom Street") who were an important part of the leather communities of San Francisco.

== See also ==
- Folsom, California
