= Satyrs Motorcycle Club =

Gay men's motorcycle club

- Founded: 1954
- Founder: Chapin "Smitty" Smith
- Founded at: Los Angeles, California
- Website: satyrsmc.org

The Satyrs Motorcycle Club (Satyrs MC) is a gay men's motorcycle club based in Los Angeles, California. Founded in 1954, it is one of the oldest continuously operating gay organizations in the United States. The club is part of the history of the leather subculture in the United States.

== Establishment and influence ==
The Satyrs Motorcycle Club was founded in Los Angeles on November 5, 1954 at the home of Chapin "Smitty" Smith, where, along with seven founding members, the club held its first official meeting. The club's incarnation had begun a few weeks prior, after a night of drinking, partying, and sex. It was the first gay organization with a set of bylaws and a club constitution. It did not use the secretive "cell structure" of the contemporary Mattachine Society, a strategy established by Harry Hay to try to minimize persecution of Mattachine Society members.

Founding members were: Chapin "Smitty" Smith, Clint "Bud" Olsen, Roy Whitney, Dub Keith, Randy Kinney, Raul Vargas and Don Gath. Several early participants were World War II veterans. Don Gath is recorded in the minutes of the Oedipus Motorcycle Club of Los Angeles, the second oldest continuously running gay motorcycle club, as their founding member in 1957 or 1958.

The Satyrs Motorcycle Club helped spawn many motorcycle clubs across the nation in its early years. Many groups copied or adapted the club's bylaws, as they were unsure how to establish themselves during and after the McCarthyism of the 1950s.

== Activities ==
The Satyrs Motorcycle Club continues to sponsor activities, including the Labor Day Badger Flats Run, which is one of their most well known events. It also sponsors charity fundraising activities, community involvement, and motorcycle-relevant events.

== Legacy and recognition ==
The club's archives are held at the ONE National Gay & Lesbian Archives in Los Angeles. A documentary about the club, Original Pride: The Satrys Motorcycle Club, was released in 2005 and shown at the Frameline Film Festival. It includes interviews with longtime members and archival footage. The Cultural Alliance of Long Beach, an arts organization in Long Beach, California, hosted an exhibit about the history of the club in 2014, titled "Rumble — The Long Road to Equality".

In 2010 the Satyrs Motorcycle Club was inducted into the Leather Hall of Fame.

== See also ==
- Homophile movement
- LGBTQ culture in Los Angeles County
- LGBTQ history in the United States
