= Leather and LGBTQ Cultural District =

Cultural district in San Francisco, California

Coordinates: 37.7739571°N 122.4125042°W

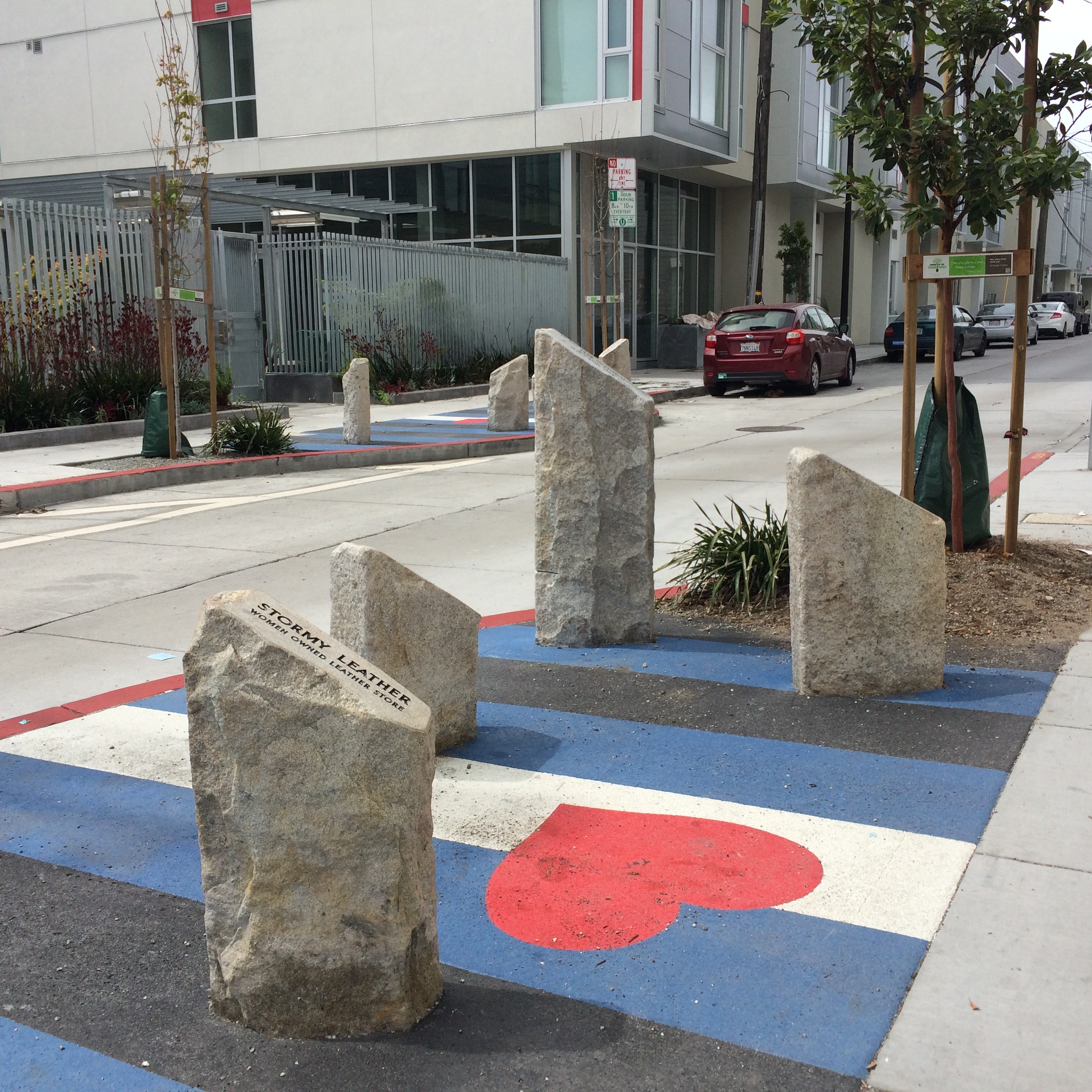
San Francisco South of Market Leather History Alley on Ringold Street

The Leather and LGBTQ Cultural District is a cultural district in San Francisco's South of Market (SoMa) neighborhood commemorating the history and culture of the leather subculture active in the area for over half a century. The San Francisco Board of Supervisors established the district with legislation signed into law by the mayor on May 9, 2018. A ribbon cutting was held on June 12 that year outside the Stud on 9th St.

The area is bounded approximately by Howard St. on the northwest, 7th St. on the northeast, I-80 on the east and US 101 on the south. There is also an exclave between 5th and 6th streets, Harrison and Bryant. It includes the San Francisco South of Market Leather History Alley, which opened in 2017.

The aim of the district is to "honor and commemorate the people, places and institutions that gave South of Market its distinctive culture and appeal, and would also help protect the remaining businesses and spaces, and sustain the people who live, work and recreate there."
