= Cleveland Leather Annual Weekend =

American leather subculture event

CLAW
- Status: Active
- Genre: Leather, Fetish, Kink
- Frequency: Annually
- Location: Columbus, Ohio
- Country: United States
- Inaugurated: 2002
- Most recent: April 2-6, 2026
- Organiser: Claw Corp
- Website: clawinfo.org

Cleveland Leather Annual Weekend, more commonly referred to as CLAW, is an American multi-day convention celebrating the leather and kink communities.

== History ==
CLAW was initially designed by leather titleholders Dennis McMahon and Bob Miller and registered as a nonprofit in 2001, with the aim of raising awareness about the spread of Hepatitis B. The first CLAW event was a bar party in 2002 at the Tool Shed, a Cleveland gay bar that closed in 2013.

In 2003, a host hotel was added, and CLAW was subsequently held at Cleveland area hotels including historic venues like the Renaissance, the Hyatt Regency, and the Westin through 2024, with the exception of events in nearby suburb Independence from 2017-2019, a virtual event in 2020 due to the COVID-19 pandemic, and an event in Los Angeles in 2021. The first induction ceremony for the Leather Hall of Fame was held during CLAW in 2009. Beginning in 2022, CLAW held a second event in Los Angeles in the fall, with the primary event remaining in Cleveland in the spring. In 2025, CLAW was held at the I-X convention center.

=== 2026 relocation ===
In 2025, CLAW announced that the 2026 spring event would be held at the Masonic Auditorium. However, in September 2025, the TempleLive company operating the venue announced that it was ending operations nationwide and all future events were cancelled.

In October, CLAW leadership announced that the event was moving from Cleveland to the Hyatt Regency hotel in Columbus. Following social media backlash, local LGBTQ+ newspaper The Buckeye Flame profiled long-time attendees and volunteers who felt "betrayed" by the move out of Cleveland, as well as the owner of host and sponsor The Leather Stallion Saloon, but highlighted event organizers' efforts to overcome persistent venue booking challenges and positive engagement from the Hyatt around the event's BDSM programming.

Following the 2026 event, CLAW announced that the 2027 and 2028 events would be held at the same venue in Columbus.

== Community engagement ==
=== Education ===
Unlike most leather events, CLAW does not host a title competition. Rather, CLAW programming is focused on education, offering workshops and classes on a variety of topics including safety in kink, leather history, HIV and safer sex. CLAW also offers HIV and STI screenings for attendees.

=== Fundraising ===
CLAW has funded LGBTQ+ initiatives around Cleveland, including the LGBT Community Center of Greater Cleveland, the AIDS Task Force of Greater Cleveland, and the MetroHealth Pride Clinic. CLAW has also provided charitable support to Rainbow Railroad, the Leather Archives & Museum,, the Woodhull Freedom Foundation, and LGBTQ+ youth programs including the Trevor Project, as well as funding sociological and psychological research relevant to attendee communities.

As of 2024, CLAW had raised more than $1,000,000 for charitable causes.

=== Recognition ===
CLAW has won multiple awards from the Pantheon of Leather, including:

- Small Event of the Year: 2003
- Large Event of the Year: 2006
- Large Non-Profit Organization of the Year: 2007 and 2012 (tied with Folsom Street Events)
- Large Club of the Year: 2012

== See also ==
- International Mr. Leather
- Folsom Street Fair
- LGBT culture
