= The Stud (bar) =

Gay bar in San Francisco, California

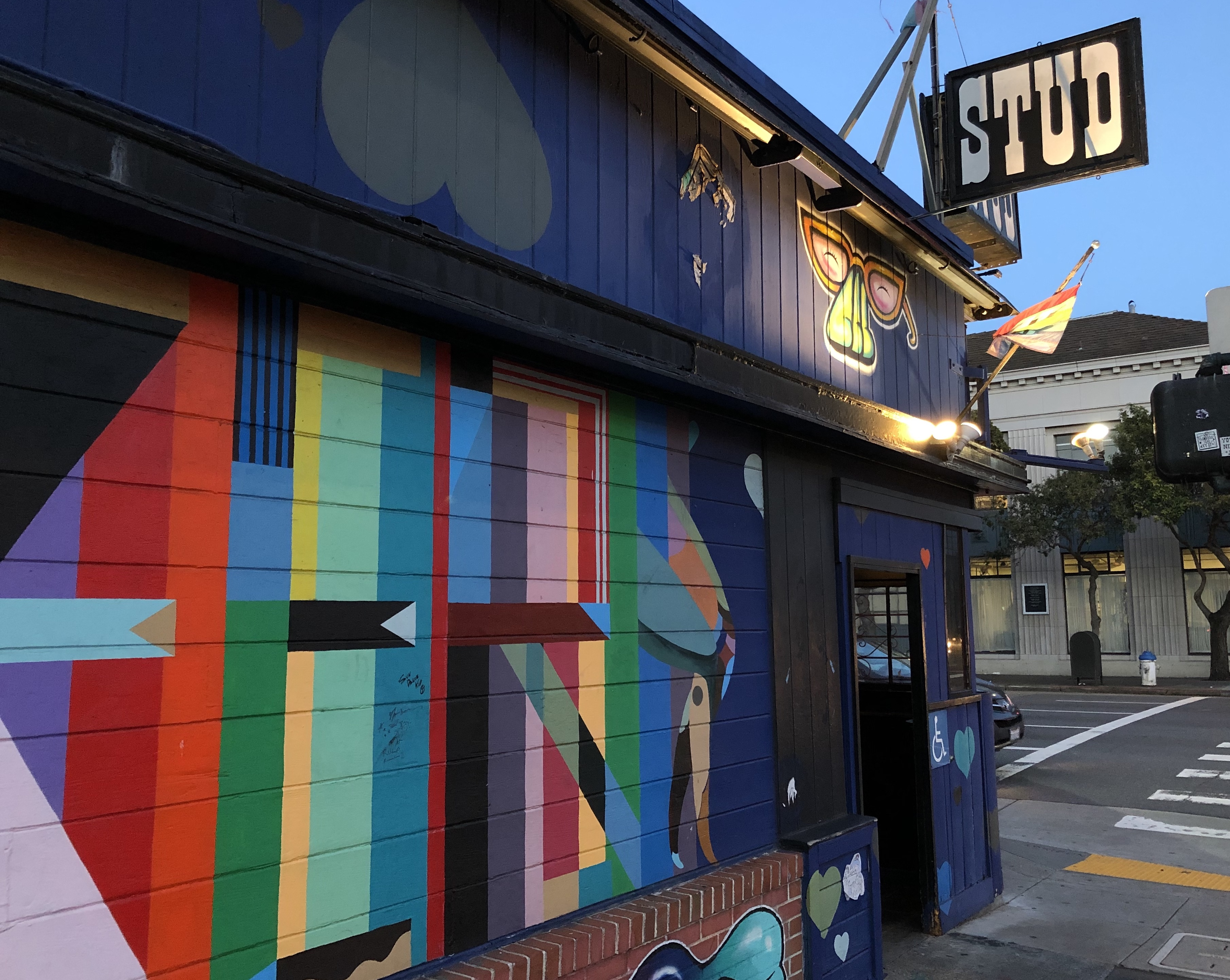
- The Stud in 2019
- Interactive map of The Stud
- Address: 1123 Folsom Street; San Francisco; U.S.
- Coordinates: 37.77613°N 122.40843°W
- Type: Gay bar

Construction
- Opened: May 27, 1966
- Years active: 57 years in business (not continuously; has been closed before)

The Stud is a gay bar currently located on 1123 Folsom Street in San Francisco.

It was started by associates George Matson and Alexis Muir (Muir was a transgender woman then known as Richard Conroy) on May 27, 1966. According to George Matson, it was a "bar for people, not just pretty bodies". Originally, the Stud was located at 1535 Folsom Street; in 1987, it moved to Ninth and Harrison Streets.

The Stud closed in May 2020, due to financial troubles stemming from a shutdown caused by the COVID-19 pandemic; however, the Stud reopened on April 20, 2024, at 1123 Folsom Street.

== History and ownership ==
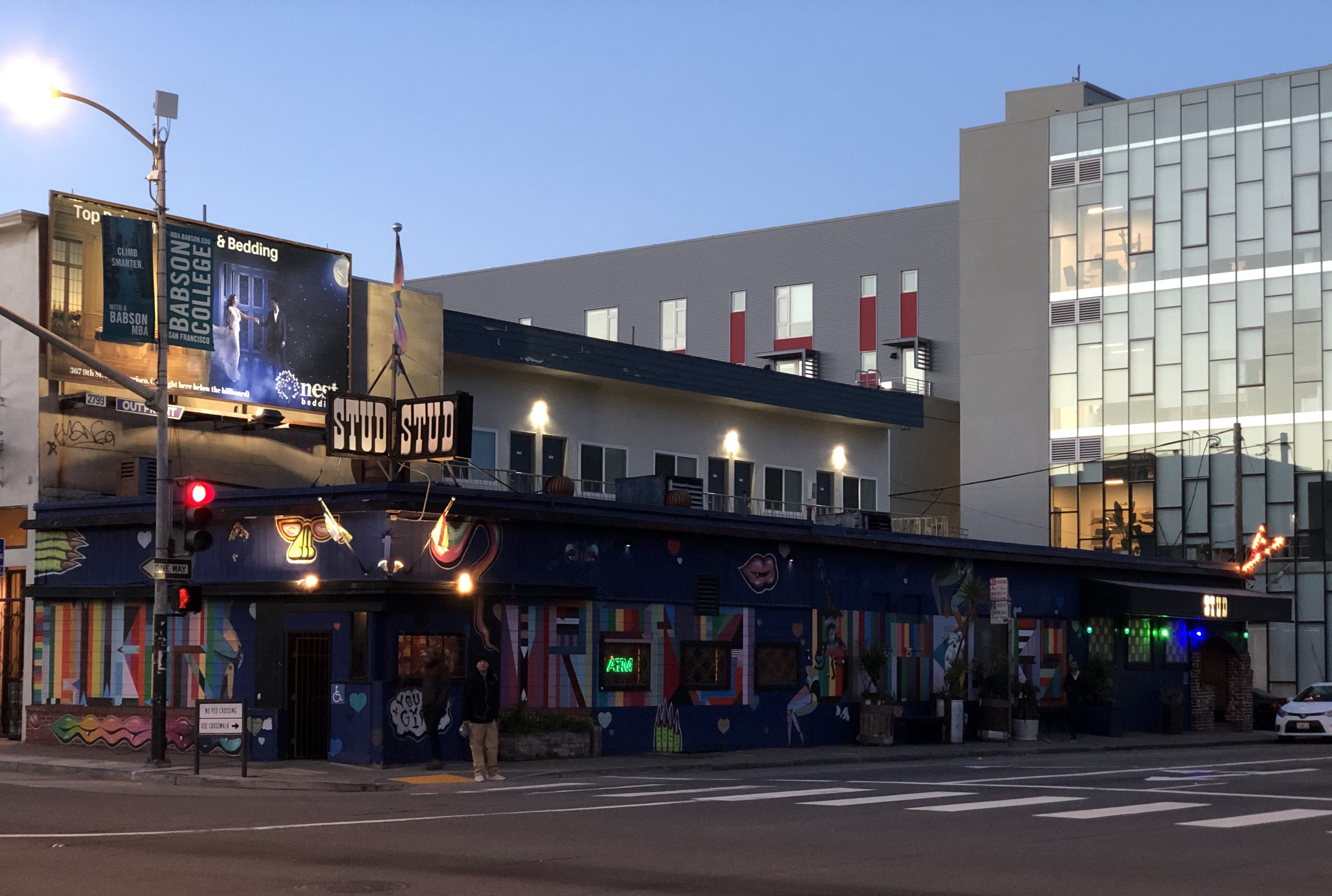
This mural was painted on The Stud in 2017 by Xara Thustra and collaborators Monica Caniao and You Go Girl

The Stud was originally started by George Mason and Alexis Muir in 1966. (Alexis Muir was a transgender woman then known as Richard Conroy; her surname Muir may be a reference to John Muir, who was her great-uncle.) In the early 1970s, George sold his half to Alexis. Alexis then sold it to Jerry "Trixie" Jones, Heidi Steffan, and Jan Hill. Jerry "Trixie" Jones was also a partial owner of Hamburger Mary's, an iconic gay restaurant, across the street. In 1974, the Stud was bought out by Jim "Edie" Fleckenstein. Edie died in 1994, leaving the Stud to his partner and resident DJ Larry Holloway aka LaRue and his accountant Ben "Fiesta" Guibord. They then partnered up with Michael McElheney. LaRue died in the 1990s due to complications from HIV/AIDS. Ben "Fiesta" Guibord died in 2011, at the age of 63, also due to complications from HIV/AIDS.

Originally, the Stud was located at 1535 Folsom Street; in 1987, it moved to Ninth and Harrison Streets. In the summer of 2016, the Stud was given a very large rent increase and Michael McElheney decided it was time to retire. When the bar was faced with closure, members of the local community began to organize in hopes of preserving the historic bar. This organizing resulted in the formation of a collective of nightlife professionals, which bought the business from Michael McElheney. Members of the collective include artists, DJs, and performers such as Honey Mahogany, Siobhan Aluvalot, Vivvyanne Forevermore, and Rachel Ryan. The collective took ownership of the Stud on December 30, 2016, making it, according to collective member Nate Allbee, "the very first co-op nightclub in the United States."

The Stud closed in May 2020, due to financial troubles stemming from a shutdown caused by the COVID-19 pandemic; however, the Stud reopened on April 20, 2024, on 1123 Folsom Street.

In 2026, The Stud announced the opening of the Stud School of Drag, and called for applications from aspiring drag performers to be mentored by local drag artists. Honey Mahogany will serve as headmistress.

== South of Market gay culture in the 1960s and the Stud's significance ==
In the 1960s, San Francisco's primarily gay areas were Polk Street, the Tenderloin district, and South of Market. South of Market became the hub of the leather subculture in the gay community in 1961 when the gay bar the Tool Box opened its doors as the first leather bar in the neighborhood. When the Stud, along with Febe's, opened up on Folsom Street in 1966, other gay leather bars and establishments catering to this subculture followed creating a foundation for the growing gay leather community. The Stud and the other establishments in this neighborhood created a safe space for gay people to gather, be themselves, and create a community. The Stud was also originally a Hell's Angels hangout; by 1969 it had become a dance bar for hippies on the margins of the leather scene and had a psychedelic black light mural by Chuck Arnett.

== Trannyshack ==
One of San Francisco's longest running drag shows, Trannyshack, was started in 1996 by Heklina, a well known San Francisco drag queen. Many famous drag queens and celebrities graced the stage at Trannyshack, including many contestants from RuPaul's Drag Race and RuPaul himself. Due to controversy over the use of the word "tranny", the show's name was called into question, prompting Heklina to end it and rebrand. In 2008, Trannyshack ended its run at the Stud.

== Honors ==
Alexis Muir, a cofounder and former owner, was honored in 2017 along with other notables, named on bronze bootprints, as part of San Francisco South of Market Leather History Alley.

The Stud is part of the Leather and LGBTQ Cultural District. The San Francisco Board of Supervisors established the district with legislation signed into law by the mayor on May 9, 2018. A ribbon cutting was held on June 12 that year outside the Stud.

== In popular culture ==
The Stud appears in the 2014 HBO show Looking. In 2024, Land and Sea Press published The Stud Pin Archives by Chloe Miller.

== See also ==
- List of LGBTQ bars
