= Leather subculture =

Subculture involving leather garments

The Leather Pride flag, a symbol for the leather community, designed by Tony DeBlase in 1989

Leather subculture denotes practices and styles of dress organized around sexual activities that involve leather garments, such as leather jackets, vests, boots, chaps, harnesses, or other items. Wearing leather garments is one way that participants in this culture self-consciously distinguish themselves from mainstream sexual cultures. Many participants associate leather culture with BDSM practices and its many subcultures. For some, black leather clothing is an erotic fashion that expresses heightened masculinity or the appropriation of sexual power; love of motorcycles, motorcycle clubs and independence; and/or engagement in sexual kink or leather fetishism.

== History ==
The emergence of gay leather as a coherent subculture can be traced back to the second half of the 1940s and the 1950s in major cities of the US. Later, it also developed in other urban centers in most industrialized capitalist countries. While gay leather developed 20 years after heterosexual European and American fetish styles, it did so relatively isolated from those existing circles and organizations.

Although there is some evidence of BDSM activities among gay men before the Second World War, this "pre-leather" scene has not been extensively researched. Due to pathologization and criminal prosecution of homosexuality and kinkiness in many parts of the world, many practitioners were extremely cautious and secretive about their activities. As a result, few sources have survived. The same is true for the early days of the leather scene after World War II. One exception is Samuel Steward (1909–1993) who lived in the US and extensively documented his kinky sexual encounters with other men. He also was part of a study of gay BDSM practices by Alfred Kinsey in 1949.

=== Formative years (1940–1968) ===
The formative period of gay leather subculture took place in the 1940s and 1950s. It mainly originated from two groups: Post-WWII California bikers in Los Angeles and "pre-leather" butch BDSM practitioners in New York City. The leather look first emerged in Los Angeles and, in subsequent years, was adopted by men in New York City, Chicago and San Francisco. A significant portion of the leather community consisted of queer servicemen and servicewomen returning from WWII, who were congregating in large US cities after returning to their home country in 1945 and 1946.

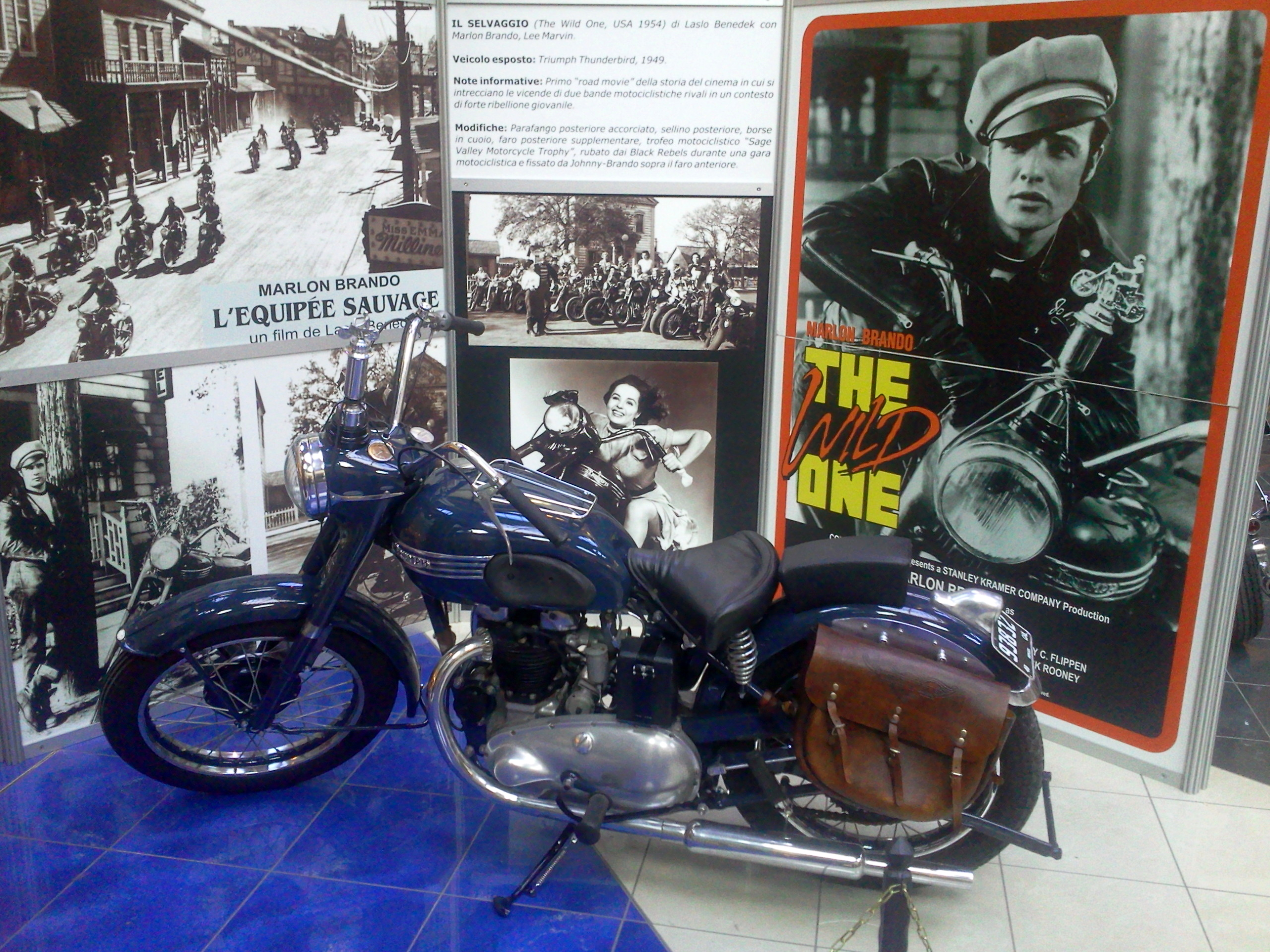
Triumph Thunderbird from the movie "The Wild One"

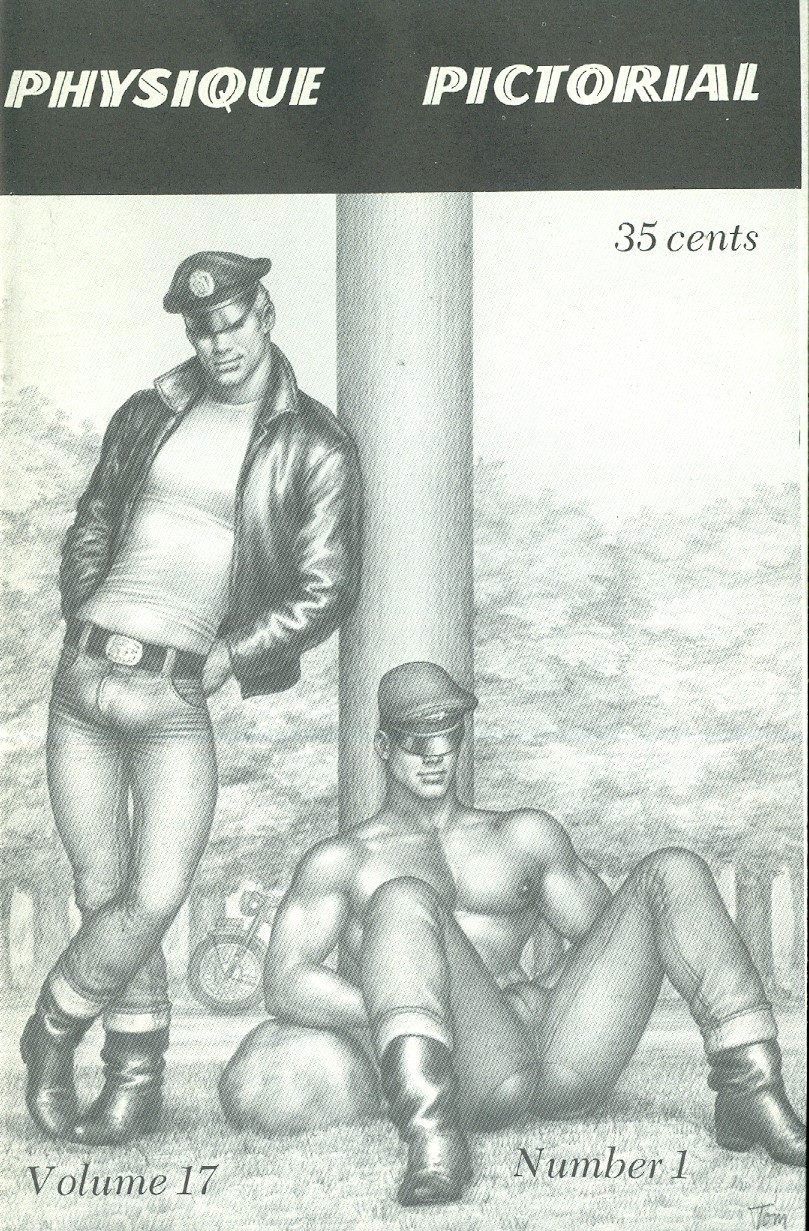
Cover of the magazine Physique Pictorial volume 17 number 1 by Tom of Finland, 1968

In Los Angeles, the gay leather scene developed from a broader biker-leather culture. Protective motorcycle clothing at this time was made of tough leather, usually cowhide or horsehide. Biker culture reflected a disaffection with the mainstream culture of post-World War II America, a disaffection whose notoriety — and therefore appeal — expanded after the sensationalized news coverage of the Hollister "riot" of 1947. The 1953 film The Wild One, starring Marlon Brando wearing jeans, a T-shirt, a leather jacket, and cloth biker cap that later inspired leather bike caps, played on pop-cultural fascination with the Hollister "riot" and promoted an image of masculine independence that resonated with some men who were dissatisfied with mainstream culture. The Wild One has been quoted numerous times as formative imagery by leathermen, who described its leather look as masculine, sexual and radical. Although the film did not create the symbolics of leather, it helped to standardize the masculine leather aesthetic and provided it with nationwide exposure. Artists such as Tom of Finland and Etienne, whose suggestive drawings of well-endowed leather-clad muscle men were published in Physique Pictorial and elsewhere, contributed to the spread of the outlaw biker aesthetic among gay men. Motorcycle culture also reflected some men's disaffection with the cultures more organized around high culture, popular culture (especially musical theater), and/or camp style.

Pioneering gay motorcycle clubs included the Satyrs Motorcycle Club, established in Los Angeles in 1954; Oedipus Motorcycle Club in Los Angeles, which split from the Satyrs in 1958. As well, the gay leather community that emerged from the motorcycle clubs also became the practical and symbolic location for men's open exploration of kink and S&M. Even in those early years, different styles of gay male leather practices could be observed: Strict, formal S&M that was based on military traditions, informal "rough sex" or "buddy sexuality" associated with motorcycle clubs, and leather fetishism, as well as a mixture of all of those three. These varied widely between regions, causing much debate today over which traditions are the original or true traditions, or whether the "romanticized versions of leather history" ever existed at all. Over time, the practitioners of kink and BDSM were joined by those who were primarily interested in the aesthetics and atmosphere of the leather scene.

New York City, which was a hub for queer life at the time, had a small community of gay BDSM practitioners that was already established in the 1940s. It was organized in the form of informal social networks, mostly through word of mouth and supplemented by encoded personal ads in newspapers. Another fixture were private parties by local players. One facilitator of recurring parties between 1950 and 1953 was Bob Milne, who had moved from Boston to New York City after multiple altercations with law enforcement, including a conviction for homosexual acts in his home. He was well known beyond the city limits.

The New Yorker community appropriated California-style biker leather in the mid-1950s, probably around the release of The Wild One (1953). Dedicated motorcycle clubs did not emerge in New York City until the 1960s, though. The earliest documented bars frequented by leathermen were a cluster of venues in New York City at 50th Street and 3rd Avenue, called the "bird circuit", namely the Golden Pheasant Restaurant, the Blue Parrot Cafe, and the Swan Club. Later, Shaw's (1953), the Lodge (1954), and the Big Dollar (1959) emerged as early "leather-friendly" bars. The lodge also imposed a dress code of leather, meaning mostly leather motorcycle jackets.

After Milne's departure in 1953 Frank Olson became a central player in New York City, mostly by facilitating contacts between practitioners via telephone and in leather-friendly bars, and organizing private parties in New York City and at Fire Island resort. Especially during the mid-60s crackdown on gay bars leading up to the 1964 New York World's Fair he held the loose group together. In 1970 Olson opened his own leather bar with his lover Don Morrison, the Eagle's Nest, later renamed the Eagle.

"If you knew Frank Olson, it was your ticket to meeting other people who were into S&M. [...] Frank was the go-to-guy New York — in London it was Felix, Berlin it was George. It guaranteed you could always find a heavy sex night in the city. You could be pretty sure that if you got tied up, you wouldn't get killed."

— Don Morrison, Fire Island Pines Historical Society, Interview with New York's original leather daddies: Frank Olson and Don Morrison

Dedicated leather bars slowly emerged between the 1950s and the 1960s in major Cities of the US (notably New York, Chicago, Los Angeles and San Francisco) and in Europe, gaining immense popularity in the 1970s. According to Lucas Hilderbrand, leather bars played an important role by giving the scene coherence as well as providing sites for assembly. Especially in the period before Stonewall, the patrons were regularly threatened by police raids. In contrast, the motorcycle clubs' regular bike runs provided opportunities for undisturbed partying and sex outdoors. In the 1970s, leather bars also became sponsors of leather contests, as well as sexual spaces (sex in bars was illegal, but mostly tolerated), evident in the back rooms, dark corners or basements which had become a regular feature of many establishments.

From the 1960s onward, leather bars became a central fixture of gay leather life, that provided a gathering space for the community and a point of entry into the scene for newcomers. Bars also played a key role in turning leather into a consumable aesthetic and identity, often enforced by dress codes. Several influential authors, who would later write about the leather subculture, are known to have joined the scene during the mid-1960s, among them Joseph Bean, Guy Baldwin, and John Preston. As Guy Baldwin stated:

"My introduction to leather life was really my introduction to leather bar life."

— Guy Baldwin, A second coming out

The first leather bars had their origins in ordinary venues that were regularly patronized by groups of leathermen. The best-known example of this is the Gold Coast in Chicago, which became a popular meeting place for the local scene in the late 1950s. After the unexpected death of the owner, Chuck Renslow bought it and reopened as a queer-owned leather bar in 1960. An iconic feature were the murals done by Renslow's partner Dom Orejudos (pen name Etienne), who also designed its logo and posters.

In San Francisco, South of Market became the hub of the leather subculture in the gay community in 1962 when the Tool Box opened its doors as the first leather bar in the neighborhood. operated from 1962 to 1971 on the east corner of 4th Street and Harrison Street and was often frequented by motorcycle clubs like the Satyrs and Oedipus. The Tool Box became famous nationwide due to the June 1964 Paul Welch Life article entitled "Homosexuality In America," the first time a national publication reported on gay issues. Life's photographer was referred to the Tool Box by Hal Call, who had long worked to dispel the myth that all homosexual men were effeminate. The article opened with a two-page spread of the mural of life-size leathermen in the bar, which had been painted by Chuck Arnett in 1962. The article described San Francisco as "The Gay Capital of America" and inspired many gay leathermen to move there. When the Stud, along with Febe's, opened up on Folsom Street in San Francisco in 1966, other gay leather bars and establishments catering to the leather subculture followed, creating a foundation for the growing gay leather community.

=== The golden age (1969–1982) ===
The 1970s are considered the heyday of leather culture, also referred to as the Golden Age. During this time, the subculture grew by leaps and bounds worldwide, accompanied by increasing organization, diversification, improving networks and visibility. Leather bars became sponsors of leather contests, inspired by beauty pageants, as well as sexual spaces (sex in bars was illegal, but mostly tolerated), evident in the back rooms, dark corners or basements which had become a regular feature of many establishments. Another feature of US-leather bars in the 1970s were bootblacks, e.g., the Gold Coast in Chicago and the Ramrod in New York City were fitted with bootblack stands. Another new development was the hanky code, which communicated sexual preferences through colored handkerchiefs.

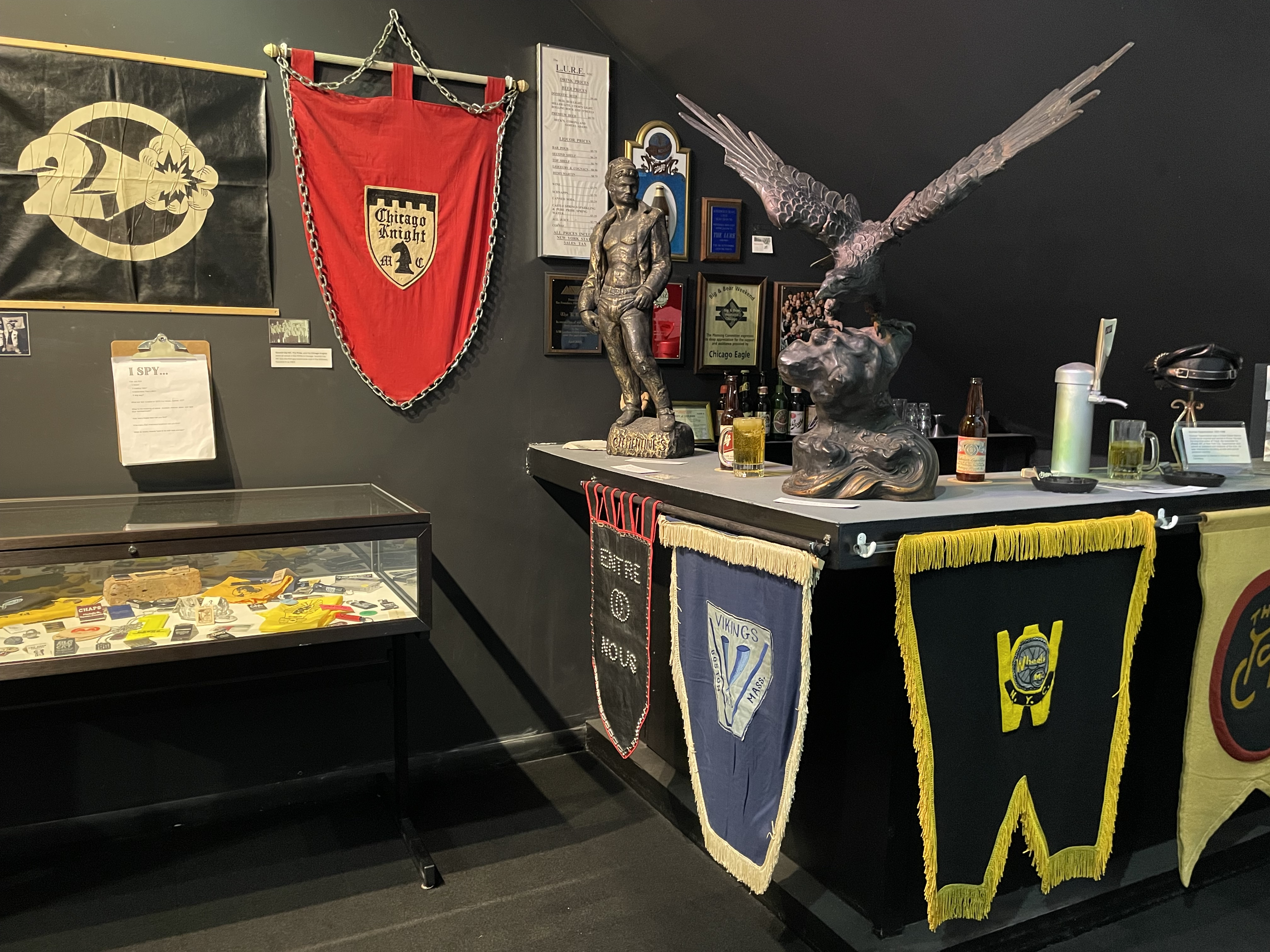
Artifacts from motorcycle clubs and leather bars on display at the Leather Archives & Museum (2024)

The first leather contest was most likely the "Mr. Gold Coast" pageant held in 1972 in the Gold Coast in Chicago, which was rebranded as International Mr. Leather in 1979. Notable sex clubs of the time include the Mineshaft (1976–1985) in New York City, Inferno weekend in Chicago (since 1976) and the Catacombs (1975–1984) in San Francisco. The "leather daddy" archetype from the late 1970s, which has sadomasochistic associations, led to the creation of the daddy archetype in queer culture.

While the scene had functioned via oral tradition and personal referral in the previous decades, the rapid growth in numerous cities was accompanied by the emergence of printed publications. This also led to greater formalization and standardization — the communities on the East and West coasts had previously developed differing traditions, such as whether S or M stood for sadist and masochist or for slave and master, or on which side keys were worn to indicate one's role. Larry Townsend's The Leatherman's Handbook (1972) is considered the first non-fiction book about the leather scene. In 1974, the first issue of Drummer magazine was published in Los Angeles, which was the most successful of the American leather magazines, and sold overseas. The publication had a major impact of spreading gay leather as a lifestyle and masculinity as a gay ideal. The magazine was focused on quality writings about leather, accompanied by erotic foto series and illustrations, and written erotica. For example, the erotic novel Mr. Benson by John Preston was first published in serialized form in Drummer magazine between 1979 and 1980 with a claimed press run of 42,000 copies per issue.

In the 1970s Berlin, Germany had a huge leather scene with several leather clubs in the area around Nollendorfplatz. The pornographic films of one of Tom of Finland's models Peter Berlin from Berlin, such as his 1973 film Nights in Black Leather, also reflected and promoted the leather subcultural aesthetic. In 1975, Europe's biggest fetish event started, Easter Berlin Leather Festival, organized annually by Berlin Leder und Fetisch e.V. MSC Hamburg began hosting an annual "international leather-party" in Hamburg in 1972. Also in Europe younger men combined the aesthetic and exploration of sexual power with the gay skinhead movement and social-fraternal organizations, from the late 1970s.

Cynthia Slater's activism for women to be accepted within the gay leather scene in San Francisco during the late 1970s brought her to mainstream attention. Slater persuaded the management of San Francisco's S/M leather club the Catacombs, the most famous fisting club in the world, to open up to lesbians; it was originally a gay men's club. It operated from 1975 to 1981, and reopened at another location from 1982 to 1984. Slater was also an early proponent of S/M safety, and one of the major AIDS activists and educators during the late 1970s. Slater hosted Society of Janus safety demonstrations during the late 1970s, cultivating a space for women within the 'plurality of gay men' already present within the leather/kink/fetish Venn-diagramatic culture.

Pat Califia, who was a lesbian at the time, was an activist in the San Francisco leather subculture, and is credited for defining the emergence of lesbian leather subculture. On June 13, 1978, Califia, Gayle Rubin, and sixteen others co-founded Samois, a lesbian-feminist BDSM organization in San Francisco that existed from 1978 to 1983 and was the first lesbian BDSM group in the United States. (More under "Lesbian" below). In recent decades the leather community has been considered a subset of BDSM culture rather than the BDSM community being considered a subset of leather culture. Even so, the most visibly organized SM community related to leather has been a subculture of leather, as evidenced by the American competition known as International Mr. Leather (IML, established 1979), and SM in the UK (established 1981). International Ms. Leather was first held in 1987.

In 1979 the newly formed San Francisco lesbian motorcycle club, Dykes on Bikes, led what was then called the San Francisco Gay Freedom Day Parade for the first time and has done so ever since. Since 1994, the event has been called the San Francisco Pride Parade. The parade now has a leather contingent. By the mid-1980s, lesbian motorcycle enthusiasts in other cities besides San Francisco began to form motorcycle clubs.

Leather and Lace, a woman's leather/BDSM support and social group, was founded in Los Angeles in 1980. The women of Leather and Lace learned the "old guard" traditions from the men of Avatar. Leather and Lace had a code of conduct and a uniform that could only be worn once a member earned the right.

=== The age of political mobilization (1983–present) ===
The leather community was hit hard by several effects of the HIV/AIDS epidemic in the mid-1980s. In the 1980s and early 1990s, lesbian leatherwomen were often involved in helping to care for gay leathermen who had been stricken with AIDS. In addition, leather title holders used their platform for fundraising purposes and advocacy work, and kinksters became more active in existing rights groups, joining the fight against AIDS. On the one hand, the leather community faced increased hostility—both mainstream society and the vanilla queer community blamed the allegedly "extreme" and "unsafe" sex practices of gay kinksters for the outbreak of the epidemic, with fisting being especially frowned upon. On the other hand, a nationwide political campaign to close sex clubs, bathhouses and similar establishments was successful, and within a few years many institutions that had played a central role within the community were shut down. The forced closing of bathhouses and increased regulation of leather bars sped up the ongoing gentrification in big cities, that already threatened their existence, so that the leather districts shrank rapidly after the explosive expansion of the 1970s.

In 1984, the Folsom Street Fair in San Francisco was held for the first time, made possible by housing activists and community organizers, to provide means for fundraising, and create opportunities for members of the leather community to connect to services and vital information (e.g., regarding safer sex) that bathhouses and bars might otherwise have been situated to distribute. It was and still is the world's largest leather event and showcase for BDSM products and culture.

Jack Fritscher's short-story collection Corporal in Charge of Taking Care of Captain O'Malley (Gay Sunshine Press, 1984) was the first collection of leather fiction, and the first collection of fiction from Drummer. The title entry Corporal in Charge was the only play published by editor Winston Leyland in the Lambda Literary Award winner Gay Roots: Twenty Years of Gay Sunshine - An Anthology of Gay History, Sex, Politics & Culture (1991).

Competing in the 1986 International Mr. Leather contest inspired Steve Maidhof to organize a conference for members of the growing leather, SM, and fetish community, which would focus on education and political activism. To host this conference, named Living in Leather, Maidhof recruited several friends and leading members of Seattle's leather community including: Cookie Andrews-Hunt, Wayne Gloege, Billy Jefferson, Jan Lyon, George Nelson, and Vik Stump. Together, they formed the National Leather Association (NLA), which officially incorporated in the summer of 1986. In October, they hosted the first Living in Leather (LIL) conference. Adding "International" to its name in 1991, the National Leather Association-International staged "Living in Leather" gatherings until 2002. After a period of decline around the turn of the millennium, NLA-I has become more active again and runs a series of awards for fiction and non-fiction writing.

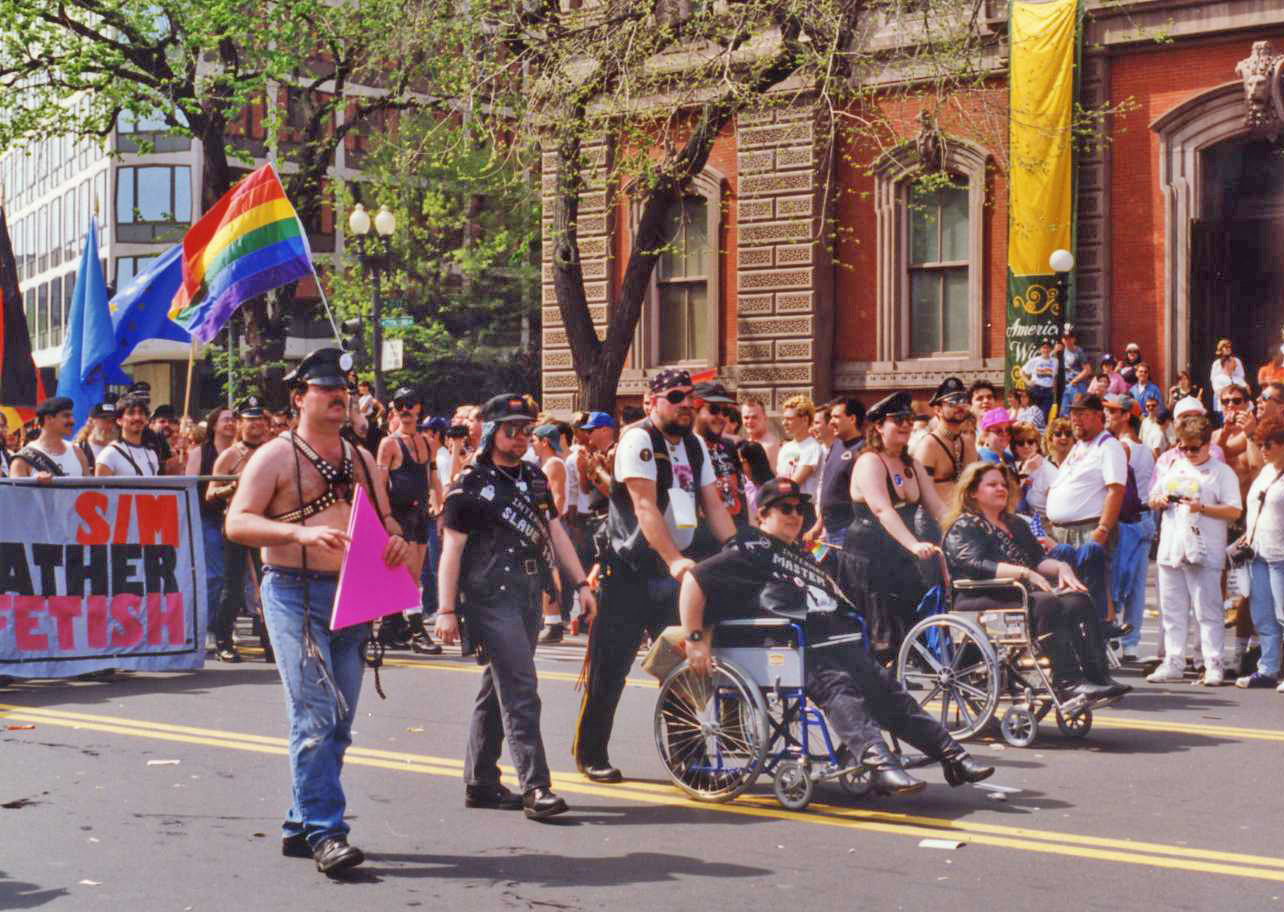
Participants representing S/M Leather Fetish in the March on Washington for Lesbian, Gay, and Bi Equal Rights and Liberation 1993

In 1987, Judy Tallwing McCarthey was the leather community's keynote speaker at the Second National March on Washington for Lesbian and Gay Rights.

The leather community doubled down on its efforts to depathologize consensual BDSM and end the stigmatization of BDSM practitioners. From 1987 onwards, leathermen Race Bannon and Guy Baldwin in particular campaigned for the removal of BDSM practices from the Diagnostic and Statistical Manual of Mental Disorders (DSM). The current version of the DSM, DSM-5, excludes consensual BDSM from diagnosis when the sexual interests cause no harm or distress.

The Leather Archives & Museum in Chicago was founded in 1991 by Chuck Renslow and Tony DeBlase as a “community archives, library, and museum of leather, kink, fetish, and BDSM history and culture.”

In 1997 the (American) National Coalition for Sexual Freedom was founded; the NCSF's mission as described on its web page is:

The NCSF is committed to creating a political, legal and social environment in the US that advances equal rights for consenting adults who engage in alternative sexual and relationship expressions. The NCSF aims to advance the rights of, and advocate for consenting adults in the BDSM-Leather-Fetish, Swing, and Polyamory Communities. We pursue our vision through direct services, education, advocacy, and outreach, in conjunction with our partners, to directly benefit these communities.

In 2002, an article in The Washington Post publicly highlighted Jack McGeorge's leadership in the Washington, D.C. leather and BDSM community. McGeorge had made no attempt to conceal his involvement in the BDSM and leather lifestyles; his full name appeared prominently on websites, and he said as much to the Post and other media. He did, however, offer his resignation to Hans Blix, hoping to preserve the credibility of his organization (the U.N. Monitoring, Verification and Inspection Commission, called UNMOVIC) before the weapons inspections in Iraq. Blix refused to accept McGeorge's resignation. Later, Hua Jiang, spokeswoman for U.N. Secretary General Kofi Annan, said that being into BDSM was no more likely to be a cross-cultural problem in the Middle East than any number of other issues.

Mark Leno was the first out leatherman to be a state legislator in the United States; he served in the California State Assembly from 2002 to 2008.

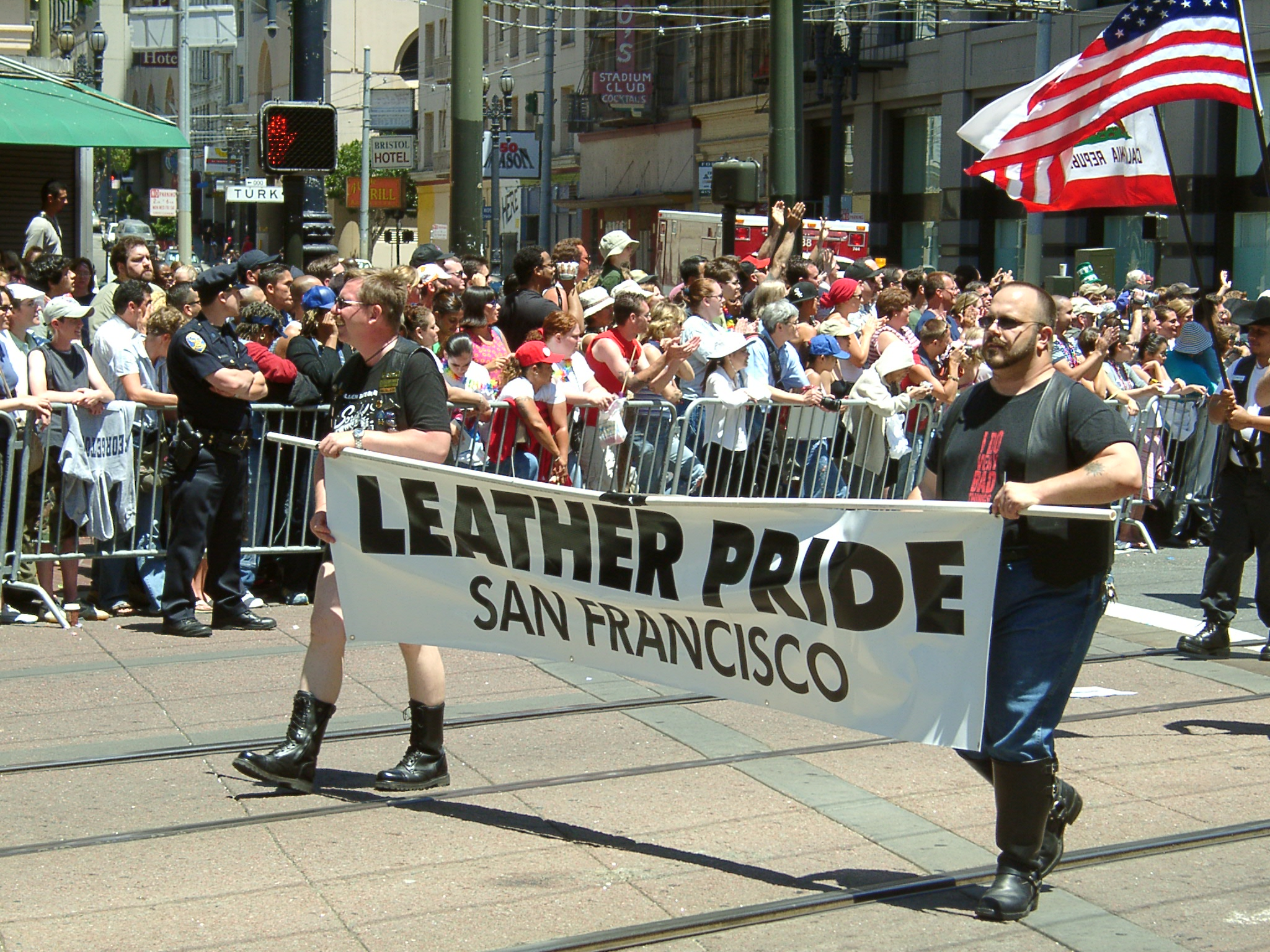
A leather contingent at the San Francisco Pride Parade.

In 2005 Viola Johnson started The Carter/Johnson Library & Collection, a “collection of thousands of books, magazines, posters, art, club and event pins, newspapers, event programs and ephemera showing leather, fetish, S/M erotic history."

In 2009 the Leather Hall of Fame began inducting members.

Leather & Grace, a (now defunct) organization of Unitarian Universalist kinksters, was founded in 2011, and combined a red flaming chalice with the stripes of the leather pride flag for their logo.

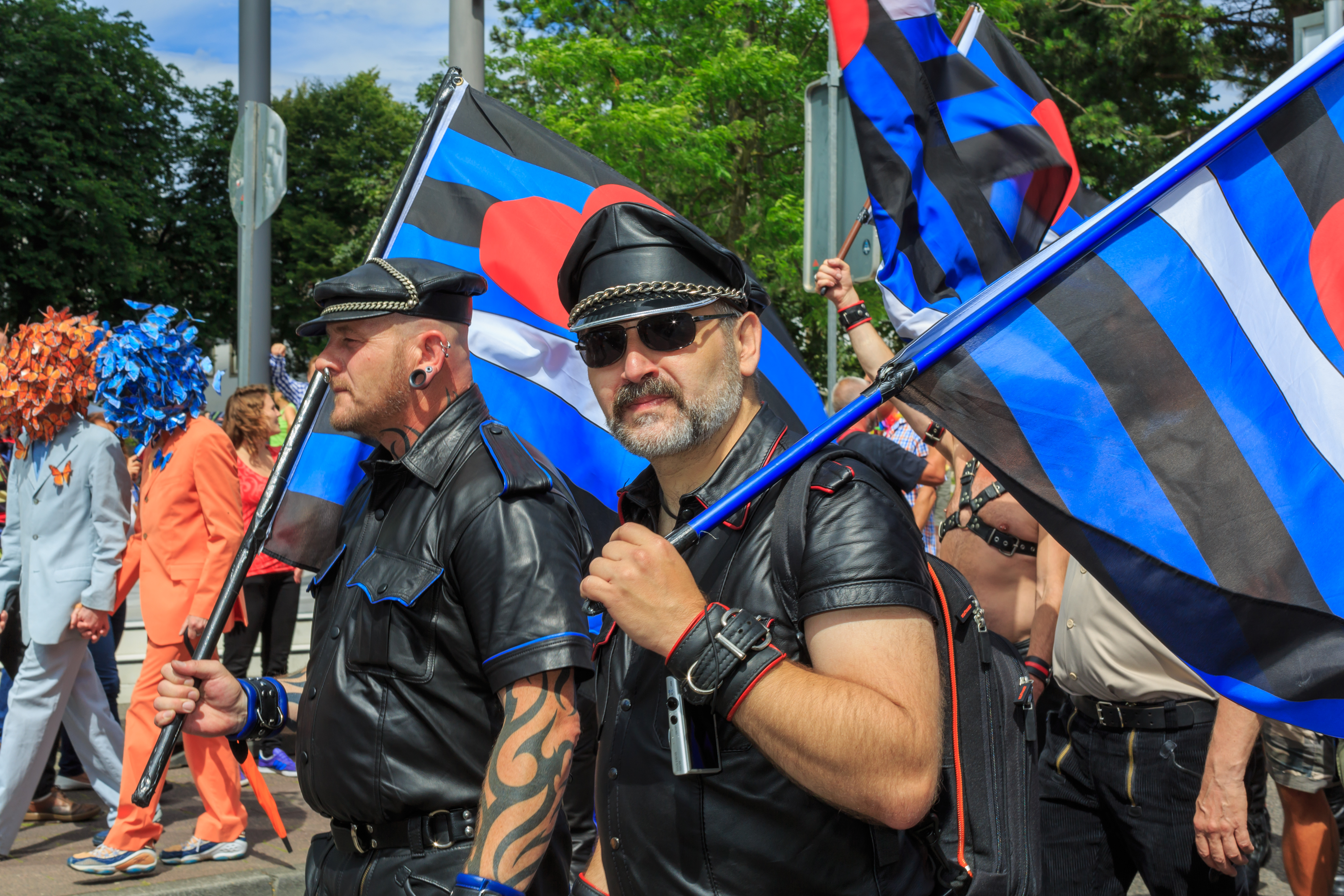
Leathermen at Cologne Pride, 2014

The LGBTQ and Leather Cultural District was created in South of Market, San Francisco in 2018. It includes the San Francisco South of Market Leather History Alley, consisting of four works of art, which opened in 2017.

In 2024, the San Francisco Recreation and Park Commission voted to name a park at Natoma and 11th streets Rachele Sullivan Park. As she (Rachele Sullivan) was a leather leader, this vote meant San Francisco is believed to be the first American city to name any public park after a leather leader.

Lately, the leather subculture is one of many facets to semi-organized alternative sexuality. Many individuals describe long periods of introspection leading to their choice to identify as "leather". Others do not necessarily associate their leather lifestyle with BDSM, and simply enjoy the sensory experience of leather.

== The myth of the Old Guard ==
Today, the term "Old Guard", "Old Leather" or "Old Guard Leather" has several meanings. Originally, "Old Guard" refers to the beginnings of the leather scene, from around the end of WWII in 1945 to the mid or late 1960s. Over the decades, this early period has been so strongly romanticized and idealized, both in fictional works and by practitioners themselves, that it is considered the origin myth of the leather subculture by some, and its roots by others. An example of this are the fictional works of Thom Magister. The Old Guard is usually portrayed as a secret close-knit community of like-minded men (e.g. in the form of motorcycle clubs), who developed a uniform hierarchical, high-protocol set of BDSM practices based on military models and lived according to a strict ethics, that included initiation, brotherhood, discipline and the pursuit of excellence. This "pure form" of leather culture allegedly was increasingly pushed underground in the 1960s, when the first leather bars established themselves and the leather scene received an enormous influx of newcomers, not all of whom were interested in the BDSM and fetish aspects of the scene. This narrative often includes serious criticism of the increasing commodification and politicization of the leather scene, as well as the introduction of safety principles like sane, safe, consensual (SSC), the inclusion and further education of outsiders, which all slowly gained momentum in the 1960s and reached a peak in the 1980s.

The discourse about the Old Guard and its historical existence has mainly been conducted since the end of the 1980s. One example of this is the anthology Leatherfolk: radical sex, people, politics, and practice by Mark Thompson, which was published in 1992 and brought together different, sometimes contradictory perspectives on leather culture. The term "New Guard" or "New Leather" emerged in distinction from "Old Guard", with both often being portrayed as polar opposites—casual versus strict, informal versus formal. But as Gayle Rubin, Jack Rinella and Joseph Bean have pointed out, both of those expressions existed from the start within the subculture.

With this context in mind, today "Old Guard" is often used pejoratively to describe older members of the leather community who hold conservative views which are seen as outdated or toxic, e.g. in terms of "correct" behavior or the inclusion of different groups of people within the scene.

There have been several revival attempts of a leather culture modeled after the ideal of the Old Guard, such as John Weal's The Leatherman's Protocol Handbook (2010). The author refers to his initiation by Old Guard instructors and presents a uniform protocol that allegedly all traditional leathermen followed. However, the book has been criticized as not being true to the historical facts, and incorporates practices which can be traced back to different sources, such as submissive positions of heterosexual Gorean BDSM.

== Subcultures ==
Today, while some may still use the term strictly in the old-fashioned sense (i.e., the romanticized Old Guard), more than ever the leather subculture in the 21st century represents the activities of several major sub-communities. These include BDSM practitioners, and people who have a preference for aggressive or masculine sexual styles; people who love motorcycles; people involved in kink or leather fetishism; and people who participate in large-scale cultural and marketing events such as Folsom Street Fair or leather-themed circuit parties.

=== Lesbians ===
Although gay men are the most visible demographic of the leather community, there are numerous women who identify as leatherwomen – and women have the International Ms. Leather (IMsL) event as their corollary to International Mr. Leather (IML). An example of a leatherwoman is Joan Jett, who has a leather pride sticker prominently displayed on her guitar.

Relatively few lesbian women were visible during the early emergence of the leather subculture. Patrick Califia, a trans man who was a lesbian at the time, was an activist in the San Francisco leather subculture, and is credited for defining the emergence of lesbian leather subculture. On June 13, 1978, Califia, Gayle Rubin, and sixteen others co-founded Samois, a lesbian-feminist BDSM organization in San Francisco that existed from 1978 to 1983 and was the first lesbian BDSM group in the United States. (More under "Lesbian" below) In recent decades the leather community has been considered a subset of BDSM culture rather than a descendant of that culture. Even so, the most visibly organized SM community related to leather has been a subculture of leather, as evidenced by the American competition known as International Mr. Leather (established 1979), and SM in the UK (established 1981). International Ms. Leather was first held in 1987, with the first winner being Judy Tallwing McCarthey, a lesbian.

In 1979 the newly formed San Francisco lesbian motorcycle club, Dykes on Bikes, led what was then called the San Francisco Gay Freedom Day Parade for the first time and has done so ever since (since 1994, the event has been called the San Francisco Pride Parade).

Leather and Lace, a woman's leather/BDSM support and social group, was founded in Los Angeles in 1980. The women of Leather and Lace learned the "old guard" traditions from the men of Avatar. Leather and Lace had a code of conduct and a uniform that could only be worn once a member earned the right. In New York, there was LSM. Only members of the club were allowed to know that LSM stood for Lesbian Sex Mafia.

By the mid-1980s, lesbian motorcycle enthusiasts in other cities besides San Francisco began to form motorcycle clubs.

In the 1980s and early 1990s, lesbian leatherwomen were often involved in helping to care for gay leathermen who had been stricken with AIDS.

=== Deaf people ===
In 1986, Baltimore Leather Association of the Deaf (BLADeaf), the first deaf leather club in America, was founded. Its original name was Maryland Lambda Alliance of the Deaf and it had three name changes before its name was changed to BLADeaf. It was founded by Elwood C. Bennett, Scott Wilson, and Harry "Abbe" Woosley Jr. According to BLADeaf, the fact of the Baltimore Eagle being BLADeaf's home bar means the Baltimore Eagle is the world's first bar to home a deaf leather organization.

In 1989, a deaf chapter of the National Leather Association called “NLA: Deaf Chapter”, which eventually became International Deaf Leather, was founded by Michael Felts, Philip Rubin, Bob Donaldson, Rolf Hagton, Jim Dunne, Bobby Andrascik and Charles Wilkinson. International Deaf Leather held contests for the titles International Ms. Deaf Leather, International Mr. Deaf Leather, and International Deaf Leather Boy. International Deaf Leather also bestowed the Michael Felts Lifetime Achievement Award, which in 1997 was given to Baltimore Leather Association of the Deaf (BLADeaf) cofounder Harry “Abbé” Woosley Jr., and the International Deaf Leather Recognition Award, which in 1998 was given to Baltimore Leather Association of the Deaf (BLADeaf). International Deaf Leather ended in 2021.

Deaf leathermen have continued to compete at IML; in 1992, IML featured three deaf contestants.

=== Bootblacks ===
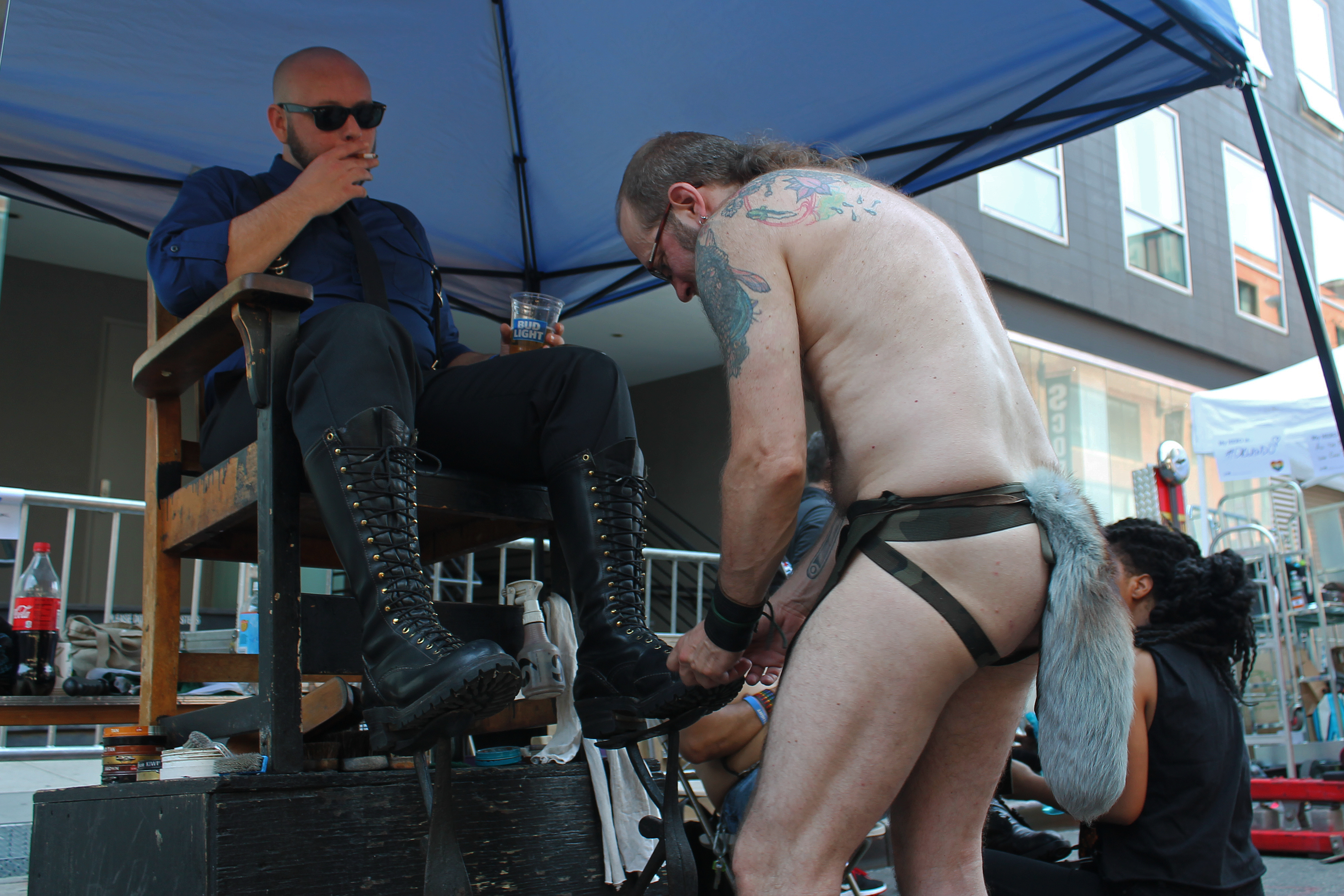
Bootblack working the stand at Folsom Street Fair.

With the establishment of local, regional and international bootblack contests in the 1990s and early 2000s, bootblacks began to gain visibility as a subculture in their own right. Nowadays, bootblack stands as well as classes on bootblacking are common fixtures at events, contests, conferences and parties. Bootblacking is rooted in service to the leather community and the care of the gear Leatherpeople use, such as leather jackets, vests, boots, chaps, harnesses, or items made from rubber, neoprene or other materials. They are not only preserving the physical items (many of which have been gifted, earned or inherited) but are also collecting the stories of their wearers. Therefore, bootblacks play a central role in the oral history of the leather scene.

=== Various age groups ===
In the United States, men's leather culture has been associated with men above the age of 40, but recent years have seen growing numbers of younger leather men. Also, in much of the rest of the world, including Europe and Australia, there is a merging of the established older leather community with young leathermen and leatherwomen and kink/fetish/gear communities. In Europe, younger men have combined the aesthetic and exploration of sexual power with the gay skinhead movement and social-fraternal organizations like BLUF, from the late 1970s.

== Leather pride flag ==
The Leather Pride flag, a symbol for the leather community, designed by Tony DeBlase in 1989

The leather pride flag was designed by Tony DeBlase, who first presented it at International Mr. Leather in Chicago, Illinois on May 28, 1989. DeBlase considered the flag to be a first draft and expected the community would suggest changes to the design. While some community members wanted a say in the final design, the majority embraced DeBlase's original design as-is. To this day, the flag has not undergone any significant revisions.

In June 1989 the flag was used by the leather contingent in a Portland, Oregon pride parade, which was its first appearance at a pride parade.

== Art ==
Artists and photographers have played a crucial role in the leather scene. In the early days, they created works that gave the emerging subculture a face and visualized taboo sexual fantasies, whether in the form of murals in bars and clubs, drawings and photo spreads in magazines (e.g. Drummer magazine) or comics, and made a decisive contribution to its dissemination.

In oral histories, for example, the works of Tom of Finland are repeatedly described as influential for one's own sexual biography. Many men identified with his characters, who were pictured as masculine and virile, thus defeating homophobic stereotypes of effeminacy. Tom's drawings were central to the development and dissemination of a more unified gay leather aesthetic, resulting in the so-called "clone look" of the 1970s and 1980s.

Tom's work wasn't pornography. It was salvation.

— Robert J. Pierce, Tom of Finland: The Case for Gay Art, The Soho News (6 February 1980)

Many artists who play a major cultural role in the leather scene are usually hardly known beyond this due to the erotic and pornographic content of their works. Exceptions are the photographer Robert Mapplethorpe and the illustrator Tom of Finland. The Tom of Finland Foundation (ToFF), which was founded in 1984, aims to promote erotic art and support erotic artists through scholarship programs.

Influential artists of the leather scene include:

- Chuck Arnett
- Tom of Finland
- Robert Mapplethorpe
- Dom Orejudos

The San Francisco South of Market Leather History Alley, consisting of four works of art, opened in 2017.

In 2022 a leather pride tartan was registered with the Scottish Register of Tartans.

== Organizations ==
The leather scene has thrived on its organizations and clubs, from informal networks in the 1940s and motorcycle clubs in the 1950s and 1960s to today's organizations focused on information and education.

Particularly in the early days, motorcycle clubs were central social hubs, which not only provided a community for like-minded men, but also inconspicuous covers for the first BDSM associations. Pioneering motorcycle clubs formed in Los Angeles, namely the Satyrs Motorcycle Club (1954) and Oedipus Motorcycle Club in Los Angeles, which split from the Satyrs in 1958. Early San Francisco clubs included the Warlocks (1960) and the California Motor Club.

In Chicago, the first club was Second City Motorcycle Club (1965), with Chuck Renslow as its first president. It built the foundation for Chicago Hellfire Club (1971), which had the express purpose of facilitating BDSM sex and has been sponsoring Inferno since 1976.

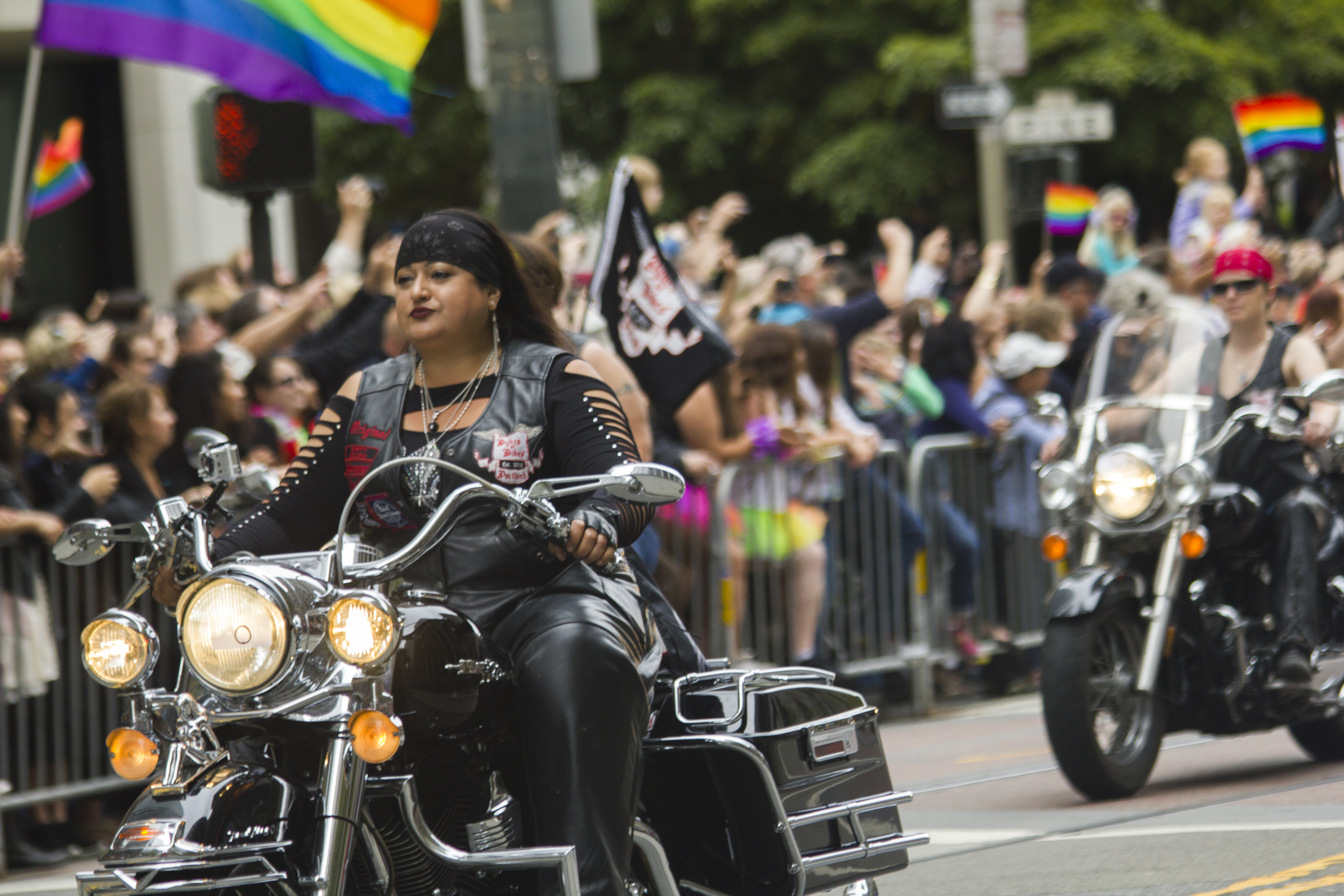
Dykes on Bikes during a Pride Parade

In New York City gay motorcycle clubs developed later than in California: Empire City MC (1964) was the first gay motorcycle club in New York, followed by the New York Motorbike Club (1967) and Cycle MC (1968).

In Europe, the first Leather Club was the Sixty Nine Club (1965) in London, other early European leather clubs include Senses (1969) in UK, MS Amsterdam (1970) and MSC Rhein-Main Frankfurt (1970), Loge 70 (1973) in Switzerland, MSC London (1973) and MS Belgica (c. 1974) in Brussels. The European Confederation of Motorcycle Club (ECMC) was founded as first confederation of kink and leather clubs in Europe in 1974, with leatherman Felix Jones being an important figure in that development.

Early clubs in Sydney included the South Pacific Motor Club (SPMC).

In 1979 the first lesbian motorcycle club Dykes on Bikes was formed in San Francisco. It has been leading the San Francisco Pride Parade since its establishment. By the mid-1980s, lesbian motorcycle enthusiasts in other cities besides San Francisco began to form motorcycle clubs.

Over time more clubs were founded that were explicitly linked to leather and BDSM. These include Samois (1978–83) in San Francisco as the first lesbian BDSM organization in the US, Chicago Hellfire Club (1971), 15 Association in San Francisco, Eulenspiegel Society in New York and the Society of Janus in Chicago.

The Gay Male S/M Activists (GMSMA, 1981–2009) and the Lesbian Sex Mafia (LSM) were founded in 1981 in New York City. Both were committed to open enrollment, as well as a focus on education for newcomers. The principle of "safe, sane, consensual" (SSC) stems from GMSMA's environment.

There are leather clubs that are particularly committed to improving the rights of different marginalized groups within the leather scene through advocacy work and community building. The best known and most established is Onyx, which was founded 1995 for and by gay and bisexual BIPOC men. More recently, Proteus Leather Club was founded in Europe for and by trans and non-binary people in leather.

== Locations ==
=== Bars, sex clubs and urban districts ===
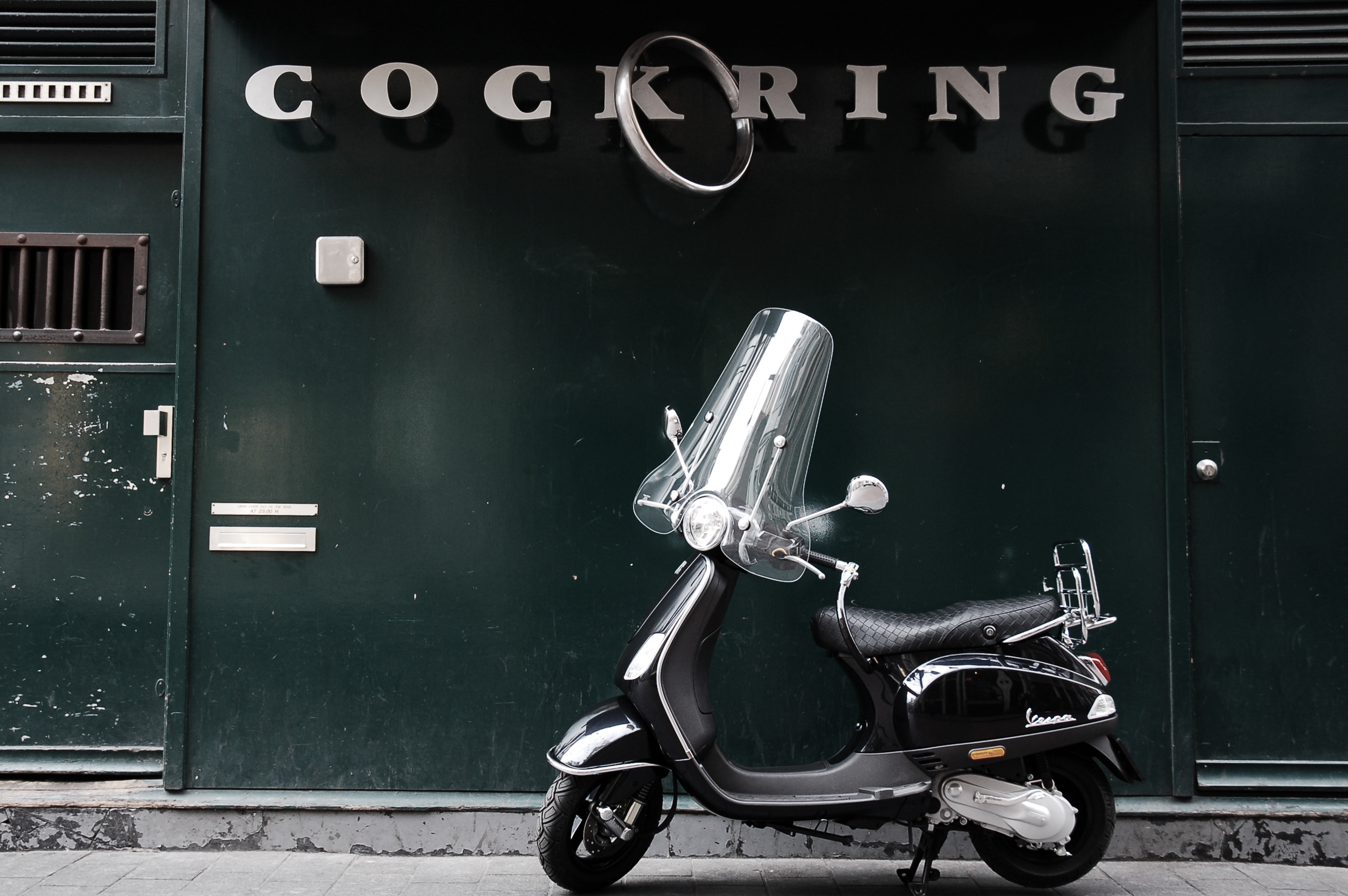
Cockring, now closed, was a popular leather and sex club in Amsterdam's Warmoesstraat.

Bars and clubs played a key role in the development of the gay leather scene, providing a gathering space for the community and a point of entry into the scene for newcomers, as well as turning leather into a consumable aesthetic and identity, often enforced by dress codes. They are considered the first distinct subgenre of gay bars, and with their characteristic visuals are often depicted as gay bars' most iconic form. Designated leather bars started appearing between the 1950s and 1960s in major cities, exploding in popularity in the 1970s. Usually, leather bars were found in industrial and working-class city neighborhoods, like South of Market in San Francisco and the Manhattan Meatpacking District.

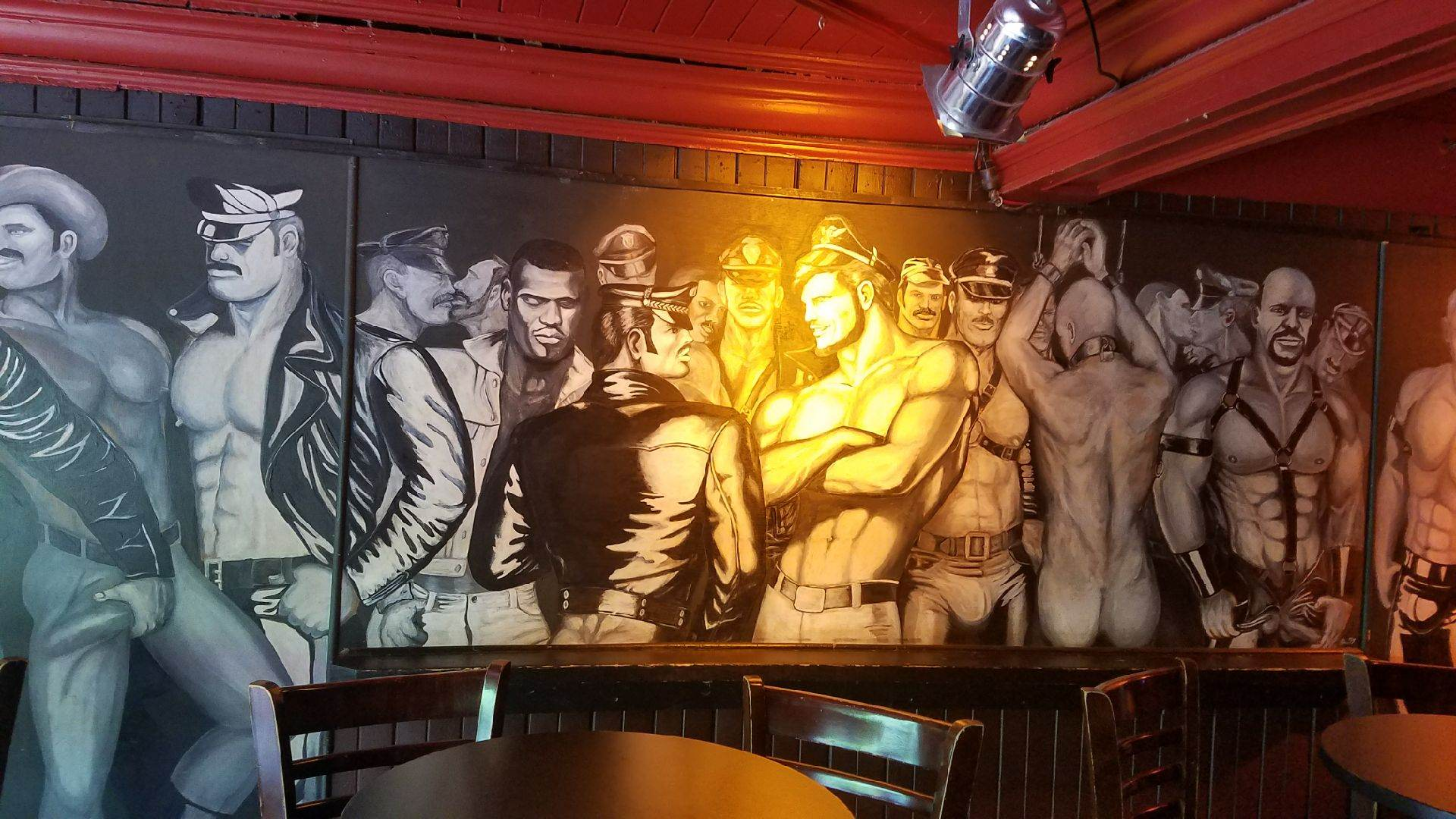
Black Eagle (Montreal)

Many major cities around the world had or have leather bars and clubs, and in some cases a concentration of these associated a particular district with the leather scene, with the most well known being the "Miracle Mile" on Folsom Street in San Francisco.

Dozens of leather bars are named "Eagle" or some variant thereof; although they are independently owned, these Eagle bars share a focus on leather, kink, and masculinity.

Leather districts include:

- Amsterdam: the Cockring (now closed) and Eagle bars and Warmoesstraat street — noting the closing of most of the leather bars once here, newspaper Het Parool stated in 2015 that "the darkroom has been consigned to history because of Grindr". On Warmoesstraat, the first leather bar in the country opened around 1955.
- Berlin: Scheune (bar), Tom's Bar, both on Motzstraße, New Action on Kleiststraße and the area around Nollendorfplatz
- Chicago: The Gold Coast, GayLife newspaper, Man's Country bathhouse and the Chicago Eagle all were located on a street block of Clark Street (from Ainslie to Winnemac).
- New York City: the sexclubs Mineshaft (1976–85) and Anvil (1974–85) in the Meatpacking District.
- San Francisco: the LGBTQ and Leather Cultural District covers the area which traditionally has had a concentration of leather bars and clubs, among others Fe-Be's, SF Eagle, The Stud, The Ramrod and the In Between.
- Mexico City: in the gay-friendly Condesa neighbourhood, Tom's Leather Bar serves special nights for the Mexican leather community since 1995.

Influential leather bars and clubs
Name	City	Country	Opening year	Closing year	Significance	Ref.
Tool Box	South of Market, San Francisco	United States	1962	1971	First leather bar in South of Market, murals by Chuck Arnett. Featured in "Homosexuality in America", an article published by Life magazine 1964.	
Gold Coast	Chicago	United States	1960	1988	First designated leather bar in Chicago, owned by leatherman Chuck Renslow, murals by Dom Orejudos (Etienne). Sponsor of the "Mr. Gold Coast" pageant (1972–78), which in 1979 developed into International Mr. Leather.	
Shaw's	New York City	United States	c. 1953	c. 1964	First "leather friendly bar" in New York City	
Big Dollar	New York City	United States	c. 1959	c. 1964	Early dedicated leather bar in New York City	
Lodge	New York City	United States	c. 1954	c. 1964	First leather bar in New York City that imposed a dress code.	
Why Not	San Francisco	United States	1961	1961	First leather bar in San Francisco, managed by leatherman Tony Tavarossi, closed after a vice squad arrest.	
Eagle's Nest (later: the Eagle)	New York City	United States	1970		Owned by leatherman Bob Milne, became the model for numerous "Eagle" bars.	
Fe-Be's	Folsom Street, South of Market, San Francisco	United States	1966	1986	Most influencal leather bar in San Francisco in the second half of the 60s, part of the "Miracle Mile" on Folsom Street, also housed the shop A Taste of Leather.	
Loreley	Hamburg	Germany	1969		Probably the first leather bar in Germany.	
Ochsengarten	Munich	Germany	1969		First leather bar in Bavaria and one of the first leather bars in Germany.	
The Anvil	New York City	United States	1974	1985	Gay BDSM after-hours sex club	
The Backstreet	East End, London	United Kingdom	1985	2022	London's longest running, and last remaining leather bar.	
Atlanta Eagle	Atlanta	United States	c. 1985/1987		Subjected to the Atlanta Eagle police raid in 2009, named a historic landmark by the City of Atlanta as the first recognized and protected LGBTQ landmark in the Deep South.	
Coleherne Arms 1866	Earl's Court, London	United Kingdom	1866	2008	Internationally known leather club in the 1970s and 1980s, nicknamed 'The Cloneherne'.	
Mineshaft	Manhattan, New York City	United States	1976	1985	Members-only BDSM leather bar and sex club for gay men. Predecessor leather bars in the same building since 1968.	
Ramrod	Folsom Street, South of Market, San Francisco	United States	1968	?	Part of the "Miracle Mile" on Folsom Street	
San Francisco Eagle (also SF Eagle; formerly Eagle Tavern)	South of Market, San Francisco	United States	1981		San Francisco Designated Landmark designated in 2021.	
Seattle Eagle (formerly J&L Saloon)	Seattle	United States	c. 1982		First leather bar in Seattle.	
Ramrod	Greenwich Village, Manhattan, New York City	United States	1973	1980	The bar was shuttered and never reopened after an act of anti-gay gun violence in 1980.	
The Stud	San Francisco	United States	1966		Originally part of the "Miracle Mile" on Folsom Street, owned by George Matson and Alexis Muir (Muir was a transgender woman then known as Richard Conroy).	
Catacombs	San Francisco	United States	1975	1984	Gay underground sex club, mostly known for fisting.	
Toms Saloon	Hamburg	Germany	1974		Murals by Tom of Finland	

=== Museums, archives and libraries ===
Many LGBT museums, archives and libraries collect material relating to leather communities, with many holding substantial collections, including the Australian Queer Archives in Melbourne and the Leather Archives & Museum in Chicago.

In 1991 Chuck Renslow and Tony DeBlase founded the Leather Archives & Museum “as a community archives, library, and museum of Leather, kink, fetish, and BDSM history and culture.” Renslow and DeBlase founded the museum in response to the AIDS crisis, during which the leather community's history and belongings were frequently lost or intentionally suppressed and discarded.

In 2005 Viola Johnson started The Carter-Johnson Leather Library, "a non-profit [501(c)(3) pending] organization that consists of a traveling collection of thousands of books, magazines, posters, art, club and event pins, newspapers, event programs and ephemera showing leather, fetish, S/M erotic history."

=== Official recognition ===
The LGBTQ and Leather Cultural District was created in the South of Market (SoMa) neighborhood of San Francisco in 2018. It includes the San Francisco South of Market Leather History Alley, with four works of art, which opened in 2017: the four works of art are: A black granite stone etched with a narrative by Gayle Rubin, an image of the "Leather David" statue by Mike Caffee, a reproduction of Chuck Arnett's 1962 mural that was in the Tool Box (a gay leather bar), engraved standing stones that honor community leather institutions (one being the Folsom Street Fair), leather pride flag pavement markings through which the stones emerge, and bronze bootprints along the curb which honor 28 people who were an important part of the leather communities of San Francisco.

On May 25, 2018, the Chicago City Council voted to designate a stretch of Clark Street in Uptown (between Winnemac Ave and Ainslie Ave) as "CHUCK RENSLOW WAY." Renslow founded numerous leather and LGBT institutions, many of which were once located on Clark St, including the Gold Coast bar and Man's Country bathhouse. The city unveiled the new street sign during the anniversary of the International Mr. Leather competition that Renslow founded.

== Events ==
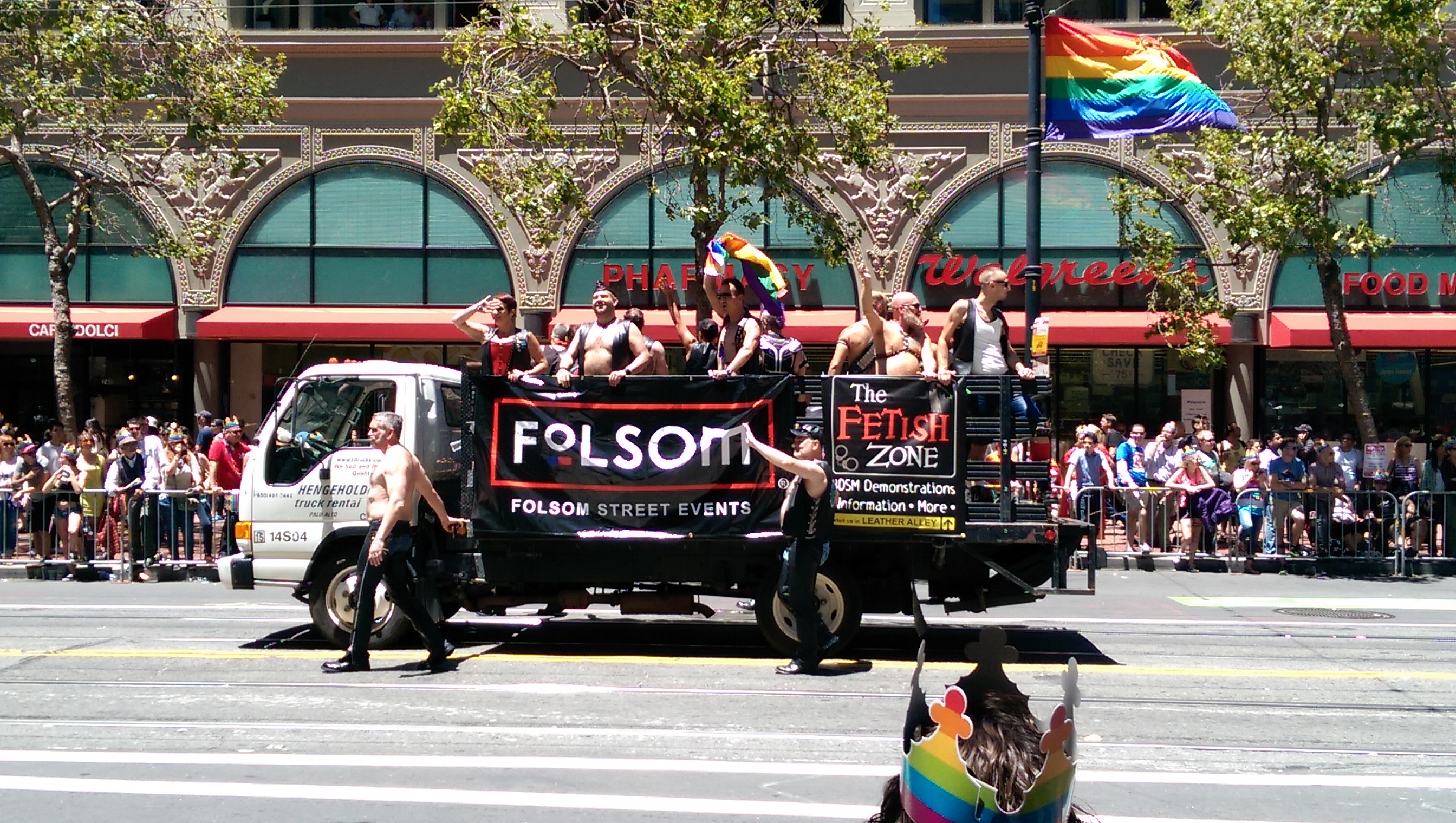
Folsom Street Fair float at San Francisco Pride, 2014

The Folsom Street Fair, begun in 1984, is an annual BDSM and leather subculture street fair held in September, that caps San Francisco's "Leather Pride Week". The Folsom Street Fair, sometimes simply referred to as "Folsom", takes place on Folsom Street between 8th and 13th Streets, in San Francisco's South of Market district. The event is California's third-largest single-day, outdoor spectator event and the world's largest leather event and showcase for BDSM products and culture. Folsom Street Events now organizes many events each year including Folsom Europe.

Other large events include Easter Berlin (the largest leather event in Europe), International Mr. Leather and Mister Leather Europe, Amsterdam Leather Pride (see Wikipedia article in Dutch) and Folsom Street East in New York City.

=== Contests ===
Many leather bars and organizations hold annual pageant contests, some of which serve as feeder contests for larger regional, national, or international competitions such as International Mr. Leather and Mister Leather Europe. The following table includes a non-exhaustive list of past and present leather contests:

Title	Organizer	Location	Established	Status	Ref.
Mr. Gold Coast	Gold Coast	Chicago, United States	1972	Reorganized into IML	
International Mr. Leather (IML)	International Mr. Leather Inc.	Chicago, United States	1979	Active	
Mr. Drummer	Drummer magazine	Los Angeles, United States	1980	Disbanded	
Mr. San Francisco Leather	SF Bay Area Leather Alliance	San Francisco, United States	1982	Active	
Mr. D.C. Eagle	D.C. Eagle	Washington, D.C., United States	1982	Disbanded	
SF Leather Daddy	Alan Selby	San Francisco, United States	1983	Inactive	
Mr. Missouri Leather	Gateway Motorcycle Club	St. Louis, United States	1983	Active	
Mister Leather Europe (MLE)	European Confederation of Motorcycle Clubs	Rotating	1985	Active	
Mr. Mid-Atlantic Leather (MAL)	Centaur Motorcycle Club	Washington, D.C., United States	1985	Active	
Mr. L.A. Leather Bear	Bears L.A.	Los Angeles, United States	1986	Active	
International Ms. Leather (IMsL)	IMsLBB LLC	Rotating	1987	Active	
Mr. Leather UK	MSC London	London, United Kingdom	1988	Inactive	
International Mr. Deaf Leather	International Deaf Leather	Rotating	1991	Disbanded	
International Mr. Bootblack (IMrBB)	International Mr. Leather Inc.	Chicago, United States	1993	Inactive	
Mr. GNI Leather	Gay Naturists International	Rotating	1994	Active	
Mr. Palm Springs Leather	Palm Springs Leather Order of the Desert	Palm Springs, United States	1994	Active	
Mr. Leather Italia	Leather Club Roma	Italy	1994	Active	
Mr. Michigan Leather (MML)	Mr. Michigan Leather	Saugatuck, United States	1995	Active	
Mr. San Diego Eagle	San Diego Eagle	San Diego, United States	1995	Active	
Mr Ramrod	Ramrod Fort Lauderdale	Fort Lauderdale, United States	1995	Active	
Mr. Texas Leather	Dallas Eagle	Dallas, United States	1996	Inactive	
International Ms. Bootblack (IMsBB)	IMsLBB LLC	Rotating	1999	Active	
Bavarian Mr. Leather	Münchner Löwen Club e.V.	Munich, Germany	2001	Active	
Mr. Fire Island Leather	Excelsior M.C.	Fire Island, United States	2001	Active	
Mr. Eagle NYC	Eagle NYC	New York City, United States	2002	Active	
Mr. Chicago Leather	Touché	Chicago, United States	2004	Active	
Mr BOLT Leather	The BOLT Sacramento	Sacramento, United States	2006	Active	
Mr Eagle LA Leather	Eagle LA	Los Angeles, United States	2007	Active	
Mister Leather Berlin	Berlin Leder und Fetisch (BLF) e.V.	Berlin, Germany	2010	Active	
Mister Leather Belgium	MSC Belgium	Antwerp, Belgium	2010	Active	
Israel Mr. Leather	32 Degrees North	Tel Aviv, Israel	2015	Active	
Mister Leather France	ASMF	Paris, France	2016	Active	
Mr. Leather Cymru-Wales	Leathermen Cymru	Cardiff, Wales	2016	Active	
Mr. Leather Spain	Leathermen Club of Spain	Spain	2018	Active	
Hong Kong Leatherman	Hong Kong Leatherman	Hong Kong, China	2019	Inactive	
Mr. & Ms. Austin Eagle	Austin Eagle	Austin, United States	2023	Active	
Midwest Leather	Chicago Fetish Weekend	Chicago, United States	2023	Active	
Mr. Leather London	London Leathermen	London, United Kingdom	2024	Active	
Mr. Texas Eagle	Eagle Houston	Houston, United States			

== Representation in popular culture ==
Aspects of leather culture beyond the sartorial can be seen in the 1970 murder mystery novel Cruising, by Gerald Walker. The novel was the basis for the 1980 movie Cruising, which depicted aspects of the men's leather subculture for a wider mainstream audience. Homosexual desire and violence were presented as two sides of the same coin. Some scenes are set at the Mineshaft (although filming took place in the Hellfire Club), with extras recruited from the Mineshaft's patrons. Among other things, the movie features a fisting scene. The filming in 1979 was hindered by protests from the gay community.

A band associated with leather culture is Village People, which began in 1977. According to Jack Fritscher, Jacques Morali drew his inspiration for the four characters of Village People from the gay BDSM leather bar and sex club the Mineshaft's dress code. Glenn Hughes, the original leather biker of the group, frequently attended there. He sported an extravagant horseshoe moustache and wore his trademark leather outfit on and off stage. As he was the band's "biker" and a real-life fanatic, he kept his motorcycle parked inside his home. Eric Anzalone was the Leatherman/Biker of Village People from 1995 to 2017, replacing original member Glenn. However, Glenn continued with management of the band. During his later years, he was known for storming the streets of New York City with his custom Harley-Davidson motorcycle. Glenn, who was also referred to by the masses as "Leatherman", was named on People Magazine's 1979 list of most beautiful people.

Distinct aspects of heavy metal fashion can be credited to various bands, but the band that takes the most credit for revolutionizing the look is Judas Priest, primarily with its singer, Rob Halford, who is gay and wears black leather. Halford wore a leather costume on stage as early as 1978 to coincide with the promotion for the Killing Machine (Hell Bent for Leather in the United States) album. In a 1998 interview, Halford described the leather subculture as the inspiration for this look. Shortly after appropriating the leather look, Halford started appearing onstage on a roaring motor bike. Soon, the rest of the band followed.

In the late 1970s, many fans of Judas Priest, AC/DC and Meat Loaf began imitating the clothing of leathermen due to the association of such fashions with toughness. Typical heavy metal fashions in the UK, US and Australia included leather battle jackets, combat boots, studded belts, and black leather jackets like the Schott Perfecto.

Freddie Mercury of Queen began incorporating leather into his stage costumes during the band's 1978 News of the World Tour. By their 1979 Jazz Tour, Mercury was wearing a full leather outfit, which he explained was inspired by clubs he frequented. Leather jackets, trousers, and accessories would feature prominently in his wardrobe for the rest of his touring career.

The touring guitar used by Joan Jett has a leather pride sticker prominently displayed on it, likely as part of celebrating gay identities.

The satirical mystery novel The Killer wore Leather (2013) by Laura Antoniou is about the murder of a leather titleholder during an international leather convention (fictional event based on IML).

== Gallery ==
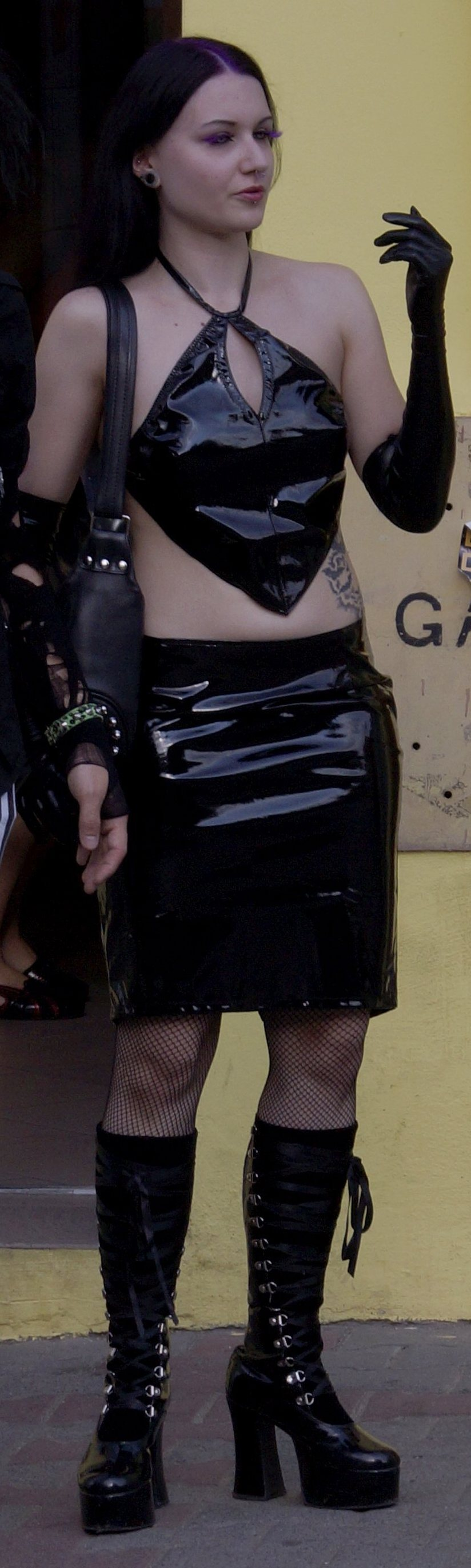

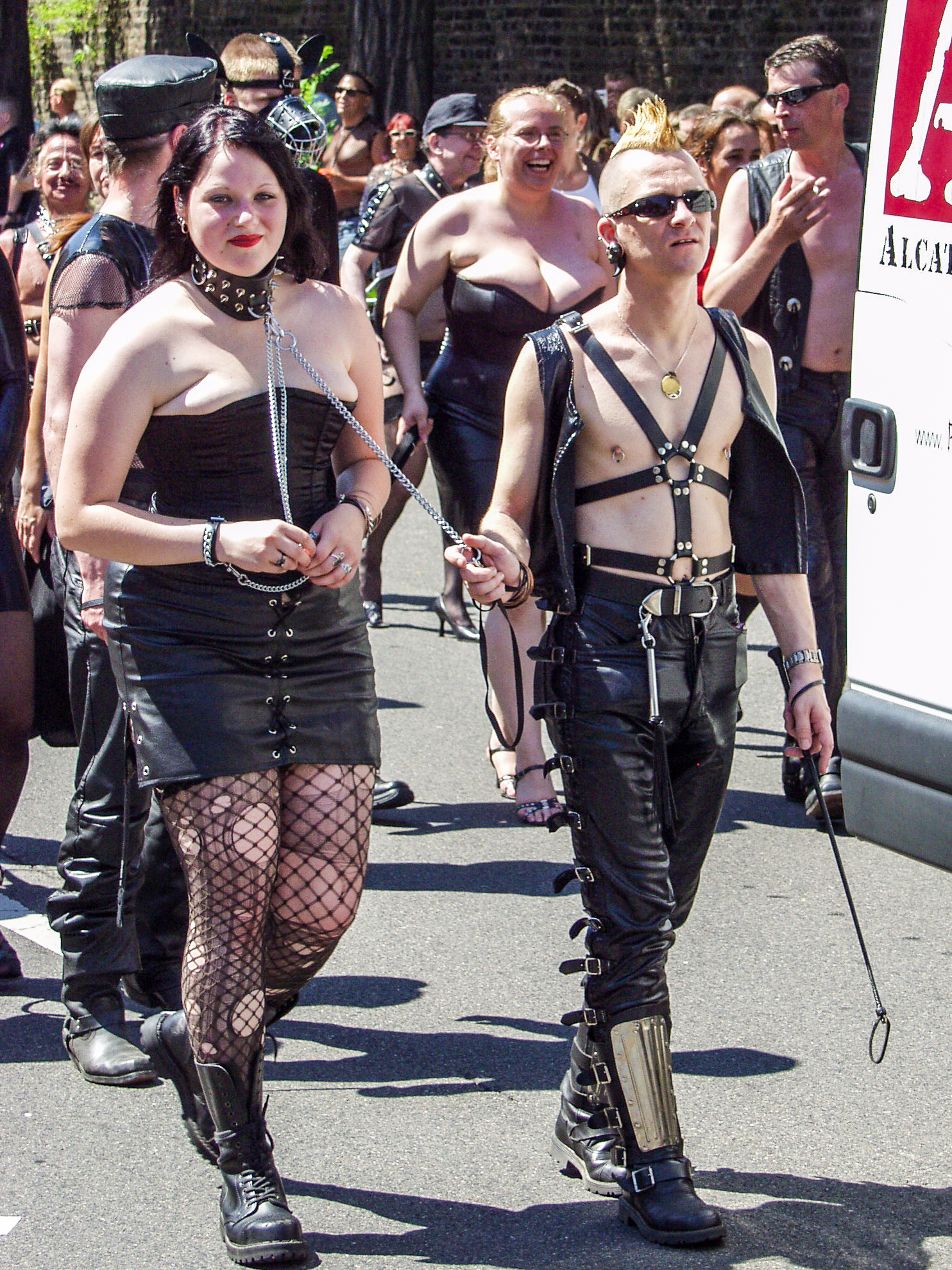

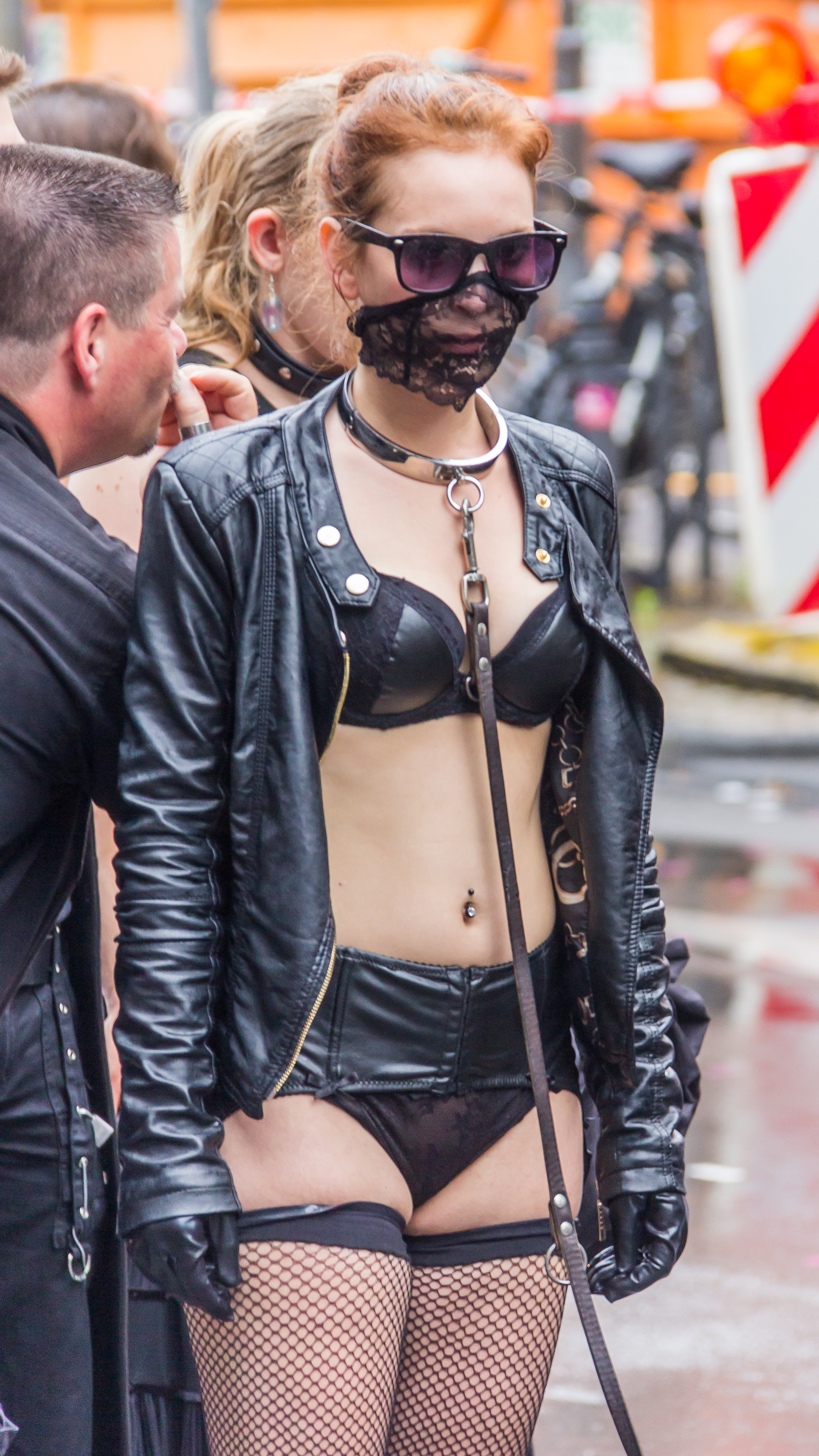

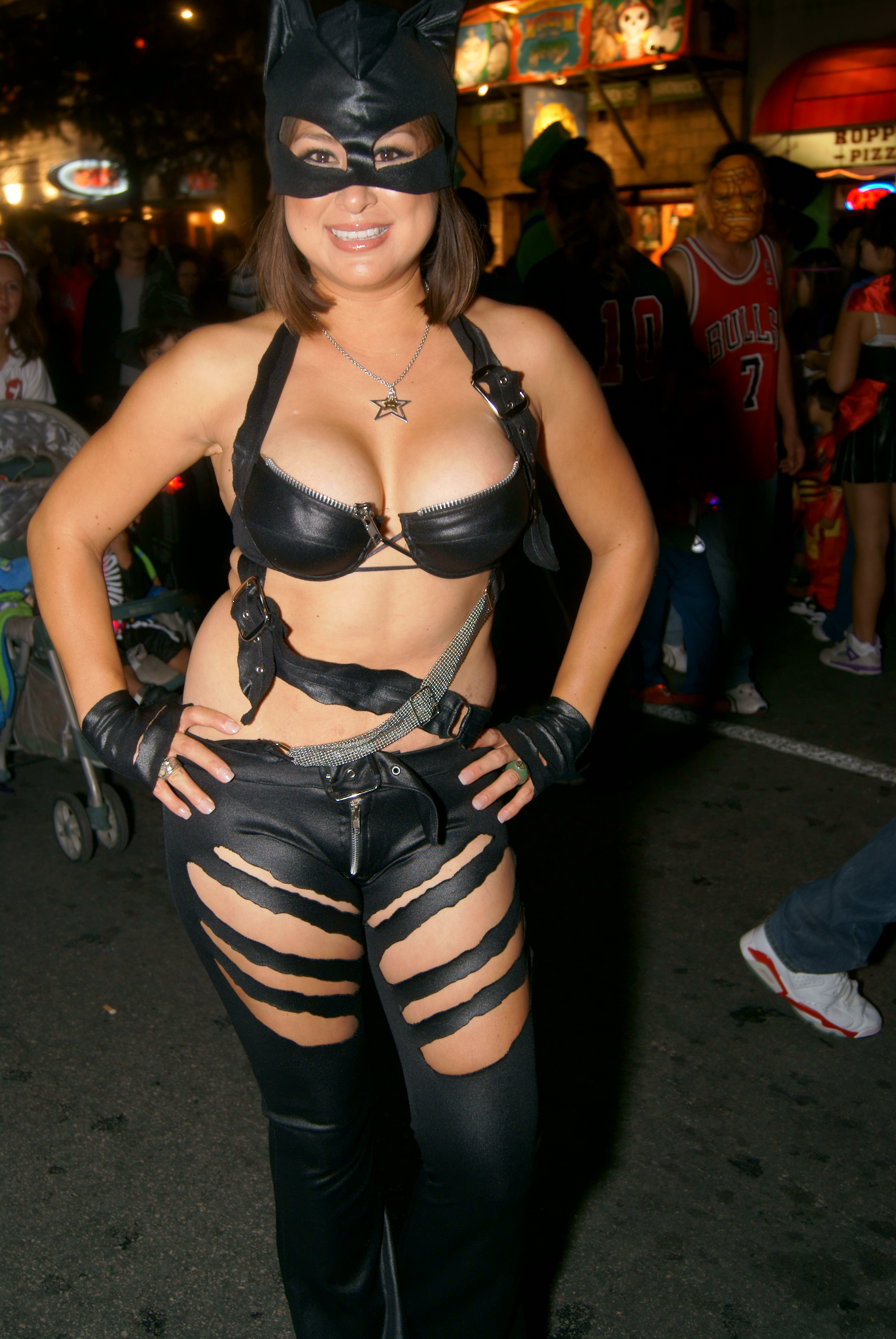

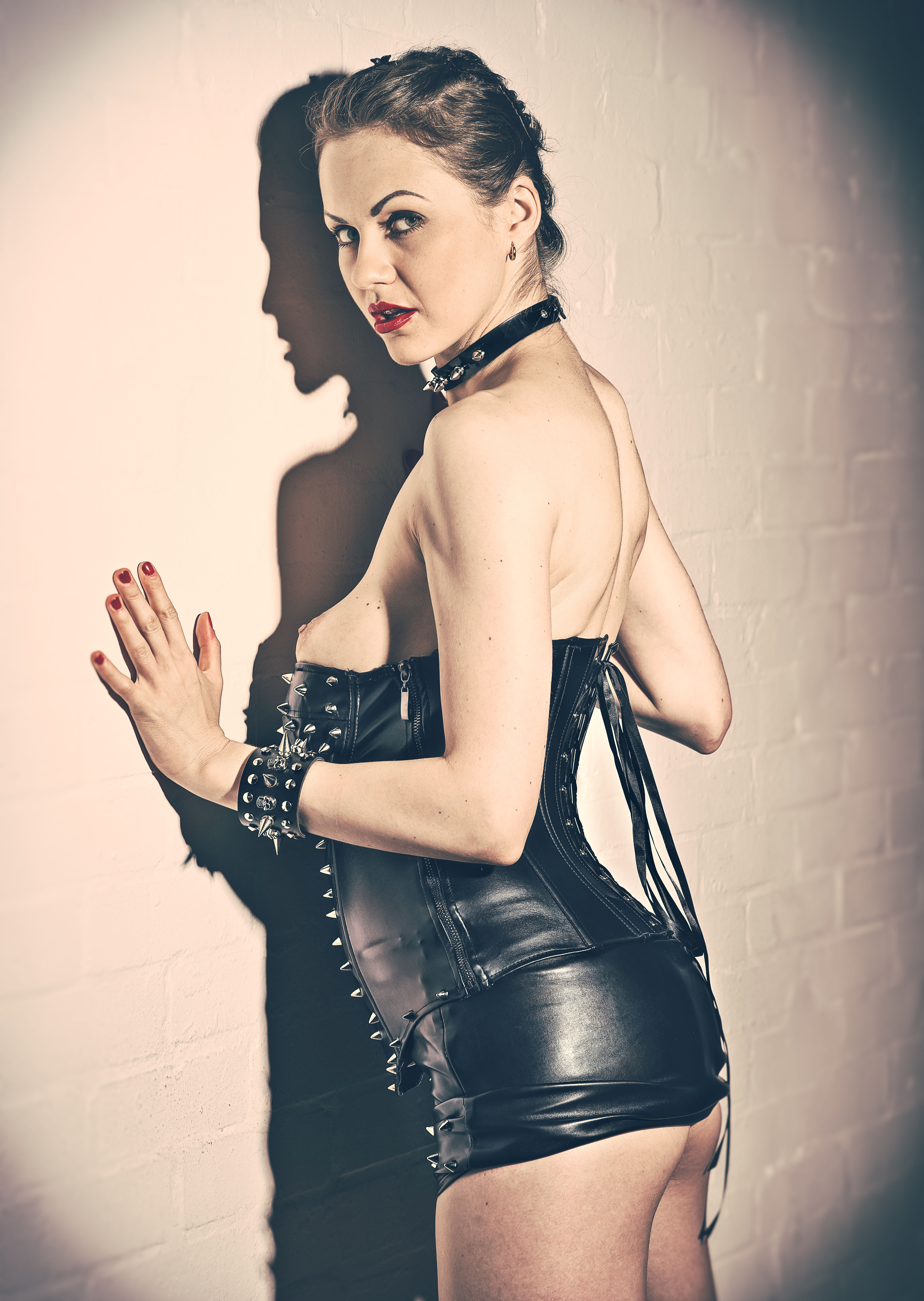

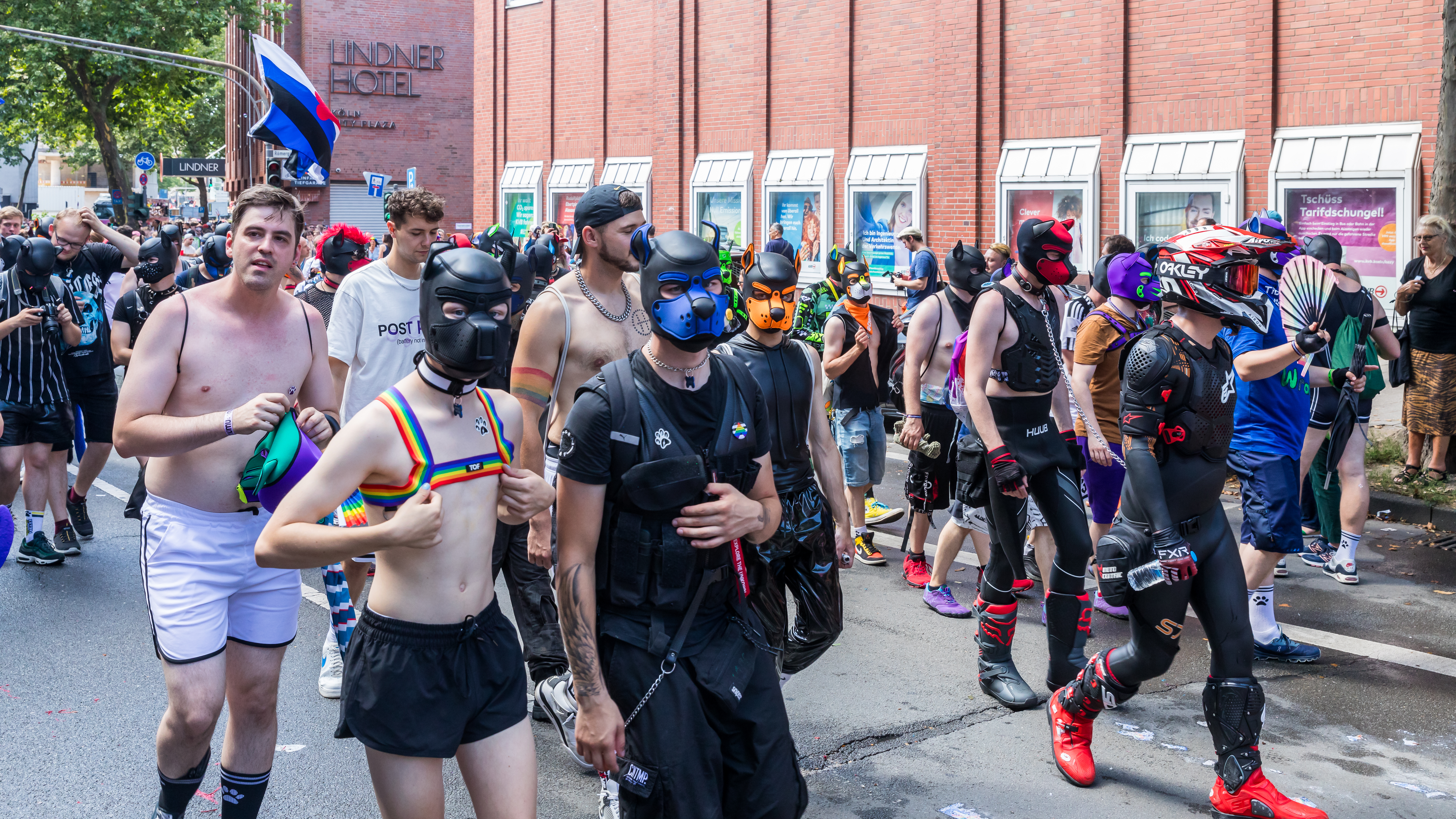

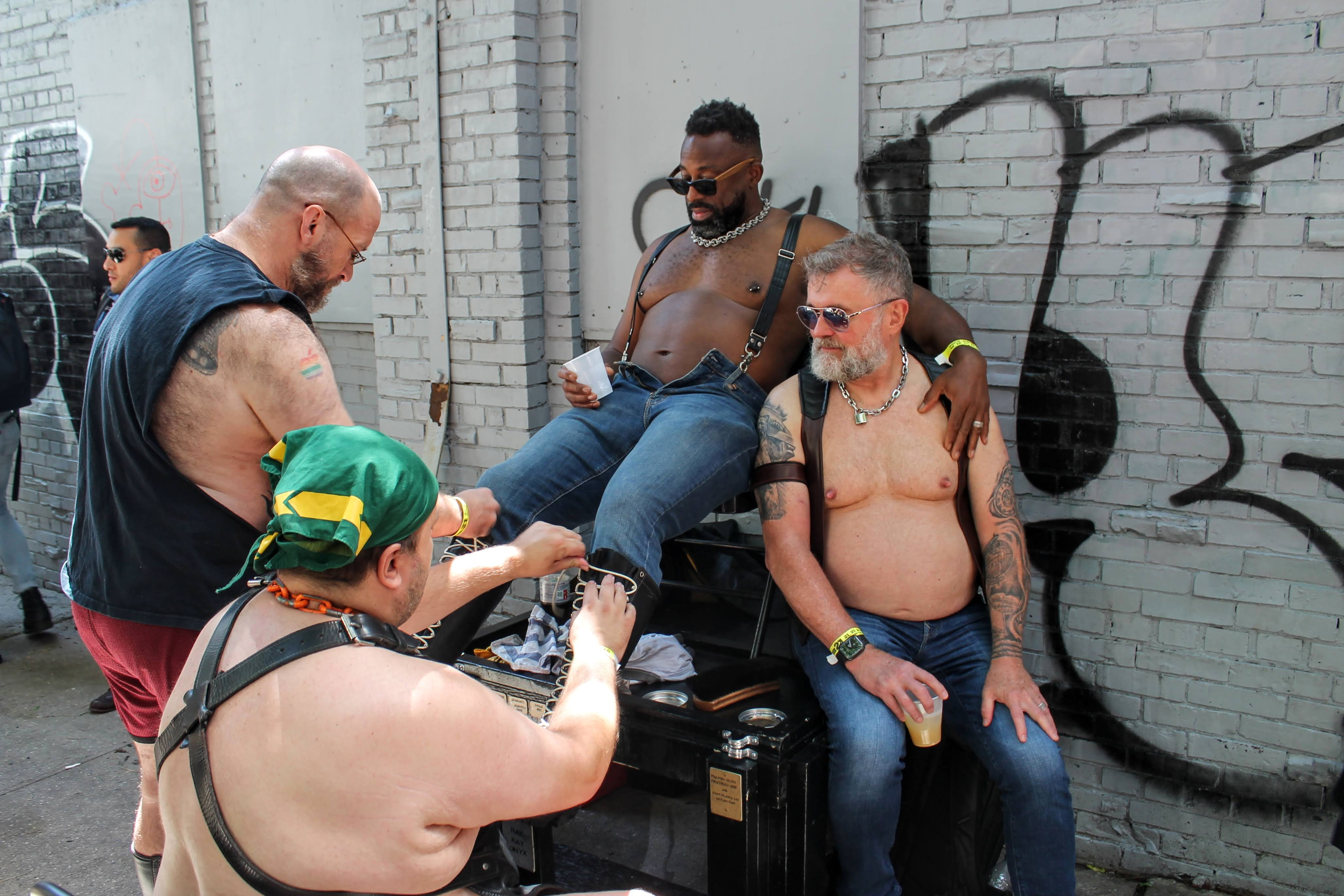

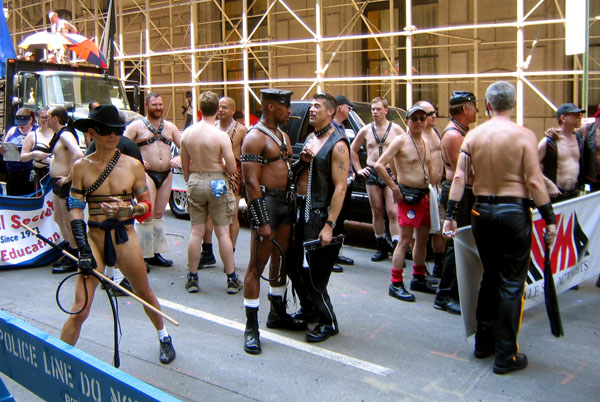

== See also ==
- BDSM
- Catsuits and bodysuits in popular media
- Fetish fashion
- FetLife
- Hanky code
- Latex clothing
- Leather Archives & Museum
- National Leather Association International
- Pup play
- PVC clothing
- Southeast Leatherfest
