= Gay skinhead =

Gay subculture

A gay skinhead, also known as a gayskin or queerskin, is a gay person who identifies with the skinhead subculture. Some gay skinheads have a sexual fetish for skinhead clothing styles.

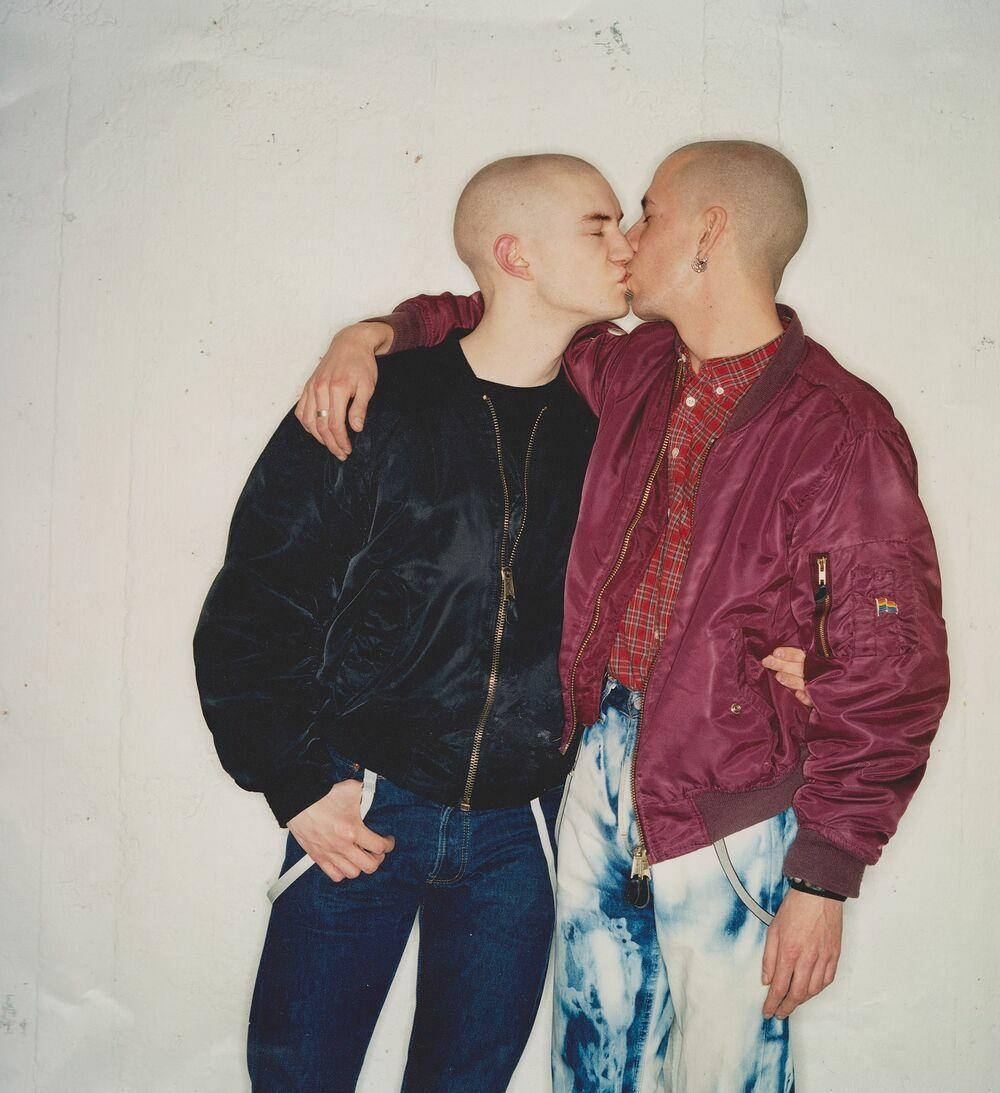
Swedish Queer skinheads in 2000

Gay skinheads figure in the work of gay artists such as Canadian painter Attila Richard Lukacs and filmmaker Bruce LaBruce. Gay skinheads have been featured on the catwalks of fashion designers Alexander McQueen and Jean-Paul Gaultier since the early 1990s.

Not all skinheads who are gay fetishize the skinhead image. These individuals may prefer not to be referred to as gayskins because of the sexual connotations—and they may not associate with self-identified gayskins for the same reason, but to traditional skinhead culture.

There exists a vibrant, gay skinhead social scene, both online and at events, particularly in parts of Europe and the United Kingdom.

== See also ==
- Nicky Crane
- Queercore
- SHARP

== Bibliography ==
- Borgeson, Kevin; Valeri, Robin (2015). "Gay Skinheads: Negotiating a Gay Identity in a Culture of Traditional Masculinity". The Journal of Men's Studies. 23 (1): 44–62. doi:10.1177/1060826514561975. ISSN 1060-8265. S2CID 146556362.
- Healy, Murray (1996). Gay Skins: Class, Masculinity and Queer Appropriation. Cassell. ISBN 978-1-62517-435-2.
- Borgeson, Kevin; Valeri, Robin Maria (2017). Skinhead History, Identity, and Culture. Routledge. ISBN 978-1-315-47479-3.
- Bell, David; Binnie, Jon; Cream, Julia; Valentine, Gill (1994). "All hyped up and no place to go". Gender, Place & Culture. 1 (1): 31–47. doi:10.1080/09663699408721199. ISSN 0966-369X.
