= Chicago Eagle (gay bars) =

Leather gay bar in Chicago, Illinois

The Chicago Eagle

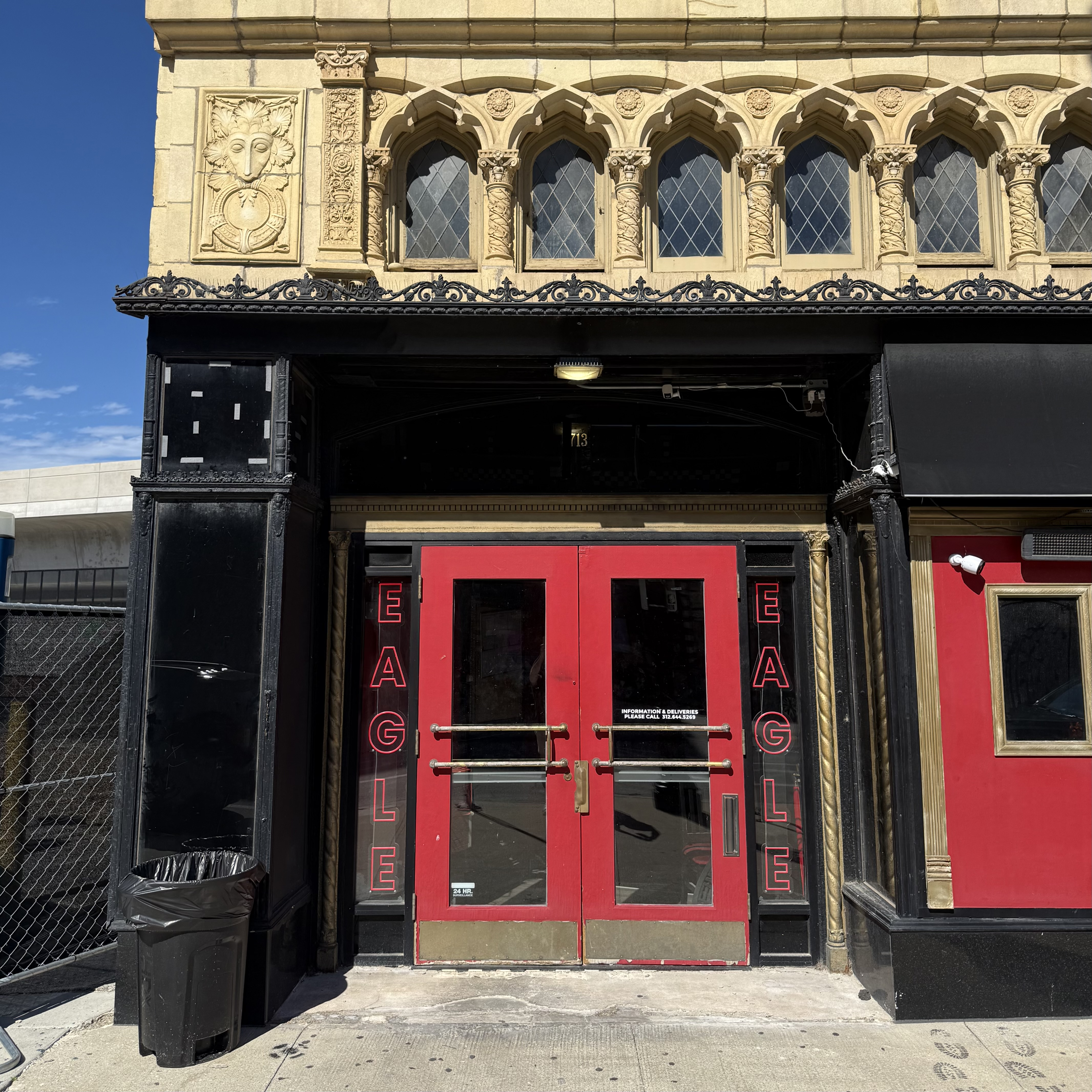
- Chicago Eagle entrance, 2026
- Interactive map of The Chicago Eagle
- Address: 4713 N Broadway; Chicago, Illinois; United States
- Coordinates: 41°58′04″N 87°39′31″W
- Owner: Chuck Renslow (1993-2006); HV Entertainment (2026-present)
- Type: Gay bar, leather bar

Construction
- Opened: 1993
- Closed: 2006
- Reopened: 2026

Website
- chicagoeagle.com

The Chicago Eagle is a gay bar in Uptown, Chicago, Illinois, United States. It is part of the informal, global network of "Eagle" bars that cater to leather and kink communities.

== History ==
=== Renslow era ===
The Chicago Eagle was founded in 1993 by businessman and leatherman Chuck Renslow, who wanted to open a leather bar after the sale and closure of his first leather bar, the Gold Coast.

The bar was located at 5015 N Clark Street adjacent to Man's Country bathhouse. Dom Orejudos designed much of the bar's original signage.

The bar's design exuded leather, sex and kink: the entrance was disguised within a semi-trailer in the alley; the bathroom was marked a neon sign shaped like an ejaculating penis and contained a large bootblack chair; the coat check was housed in a mock jail cell; and every room featured televisions playing pornography.

The bar's lower level, called the Grease Pit, was especially popular for sex: it featured padded benches, a St. Andrew's cross and "a very busy bathroom"; former patrons and staff recounted all manner of sex acts, including flogging and fisting.

The Chicago Eagle frequently hosted rubber and leather contests including Mr. World Rubber and Mr. Olympus Leather.

In 2006, Renslow announced plans to close the bar in order to expand Man's Country. Some artifacts from the bar are stored at the Leather Archives & Museum.

=== Revival ===
In 2025, HV Entertainment — the owner of the Atlanta Eagle — announced plans to reopen the Chicago Eagle at a new location in the historic Uptown Broadway Building. ^{Note 1}

The Chicago Eagle officially reopened in 2026 during IML weekend. It has a street-level bar and patio as well as a basement with multiple bars and dance floors.

The bar hosts drag shows in partnership with the Baton Show Lounge, fetish groups such as Chicago Pet Patrol and Mid America Fists In Action, and guest DJs such as Shea Couleé.

== Notes ==
^Note 1 In 2025, George Dante Pineda announced plans to open a separate bar in Andersonville called Eagle Chicago, which he billed as a spiritual successor to Renslow's bar. Pineda's bar has yet to open as of November 2026.

== See also ==
- Bear (gay culture)
- The Eagle (gay bars)
- LGBTQ culture
- National Leather Association International
