= McDonald's Chicago Flagship =

McDonald's restaurant in Chicago

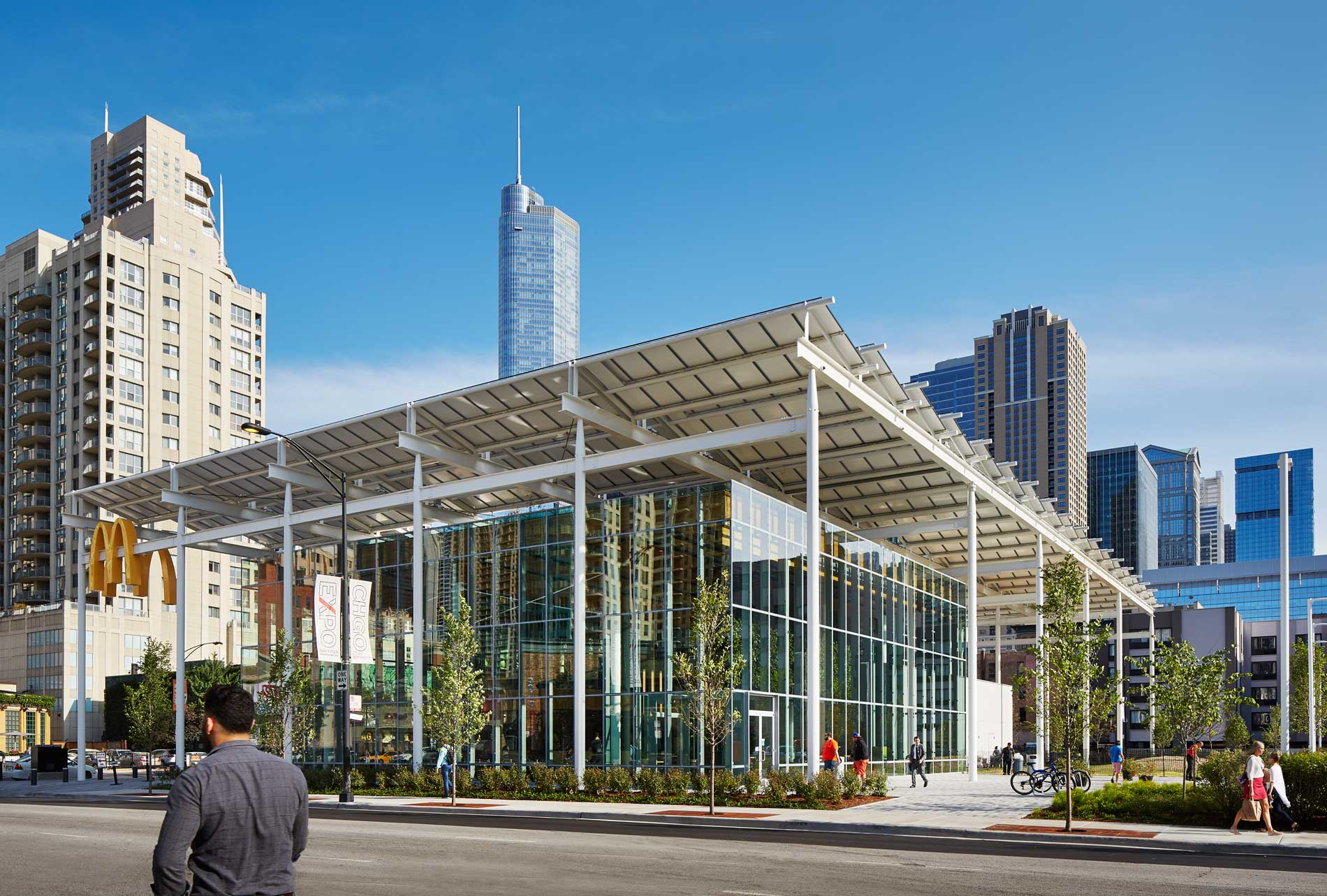
- The restaurant following the 2018 rebuild

General information
- Type: Restaurant
- Location: 600 N Clark St, Chicago, IL 60610, United States
- Coordinates: 41.8929°N 87.6316°W
- Completed: 2018

Design and construction
- Architect: Ross Barney Architects

The McDonald's Chicago Flagship is a flagship McDonald's restaurant located in Chicago.

The McDonald's restaurant on the site first opened in 1983. It had a rock and roll theme, and was first called the Original Rock 'N Roll McDonald's, and later the Rock N Roll McDonald's. It was one of the most famous McDonald's locations in the world and was once the busiest in the United States. The building had long been a local tourist attraction. The original building was demolished in 2004, a new structure opened in 2005 with a maximum occupancy of 300, which is about three times the standard McDonald's patron seating capacity. The original 1983 building and the first design of the rebuilt 2005 structure site held a rock and roll exhibit in a building adjacent to the restaurant and a small upstairs McDonald's museum display. The building featured the first two-lane McDonald's drive-through, relatively luxurious decor, a café, flat panel televisions and a green roof.

In 2017, the restaurant was rebuilt and the Rock and Roll theme was relinquished. The building was designed to be eco-friendly by Carol Ross Barney, Ross Barney Architects, with interiors by Landini Associates. The redesign won the design excellence Award of Merit from the Chicago chapter of the American Institute of Architects in 2019.

== Location ==
The restaurant/museum, its rock and roll exhibit and its parking lot occupy the entire block bounded by West Ontario Street to the north, West Ohio Street to the south, North LaSalle Street to the west and North Clark Street to the east in the River North neighborhood of the Near North Side community area. It is across the street (Clark Street) from the Hard Rock Cafe and the Rainforest Cafe.

== History ==
=== Rock and roll theme ===
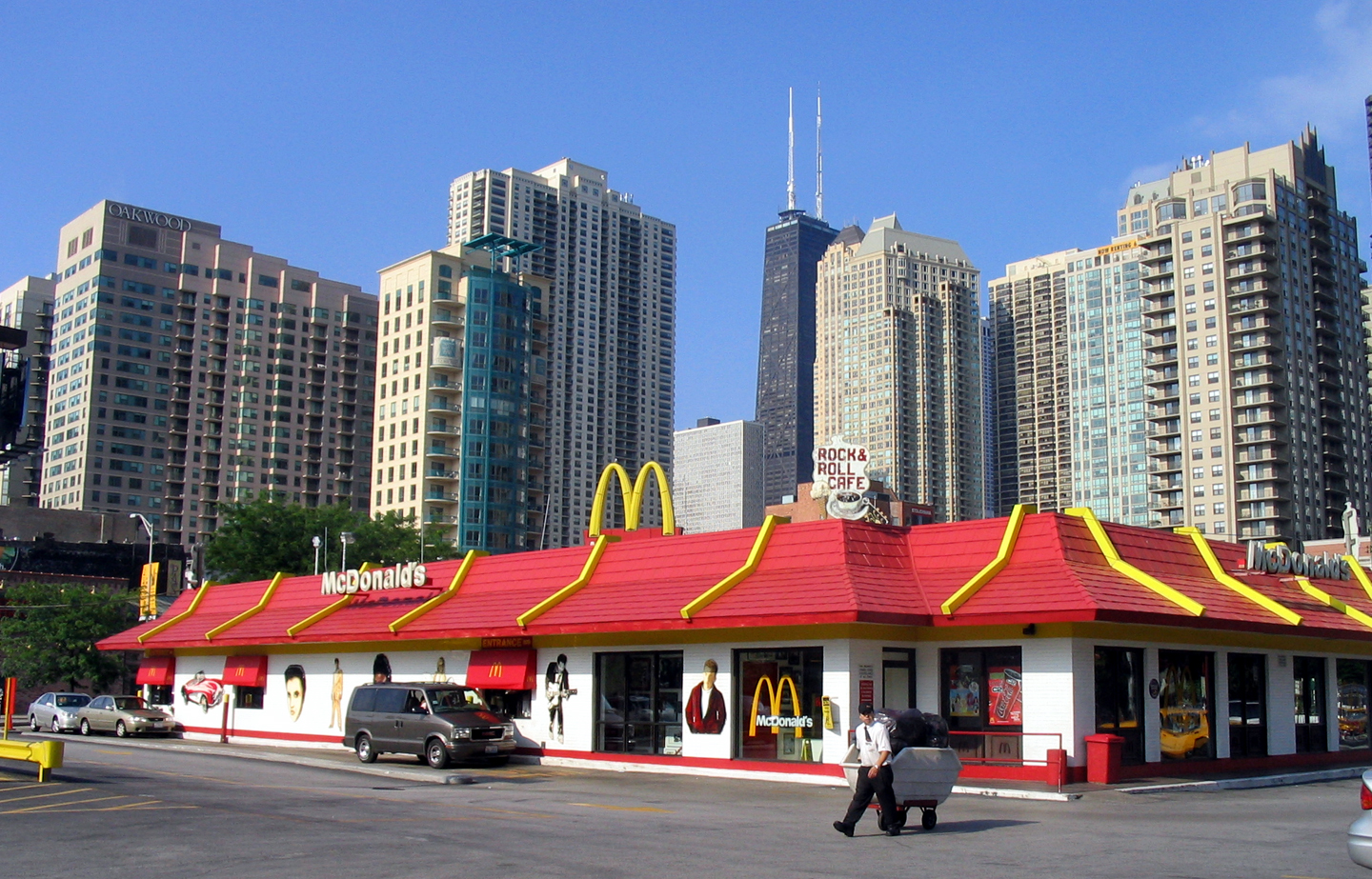
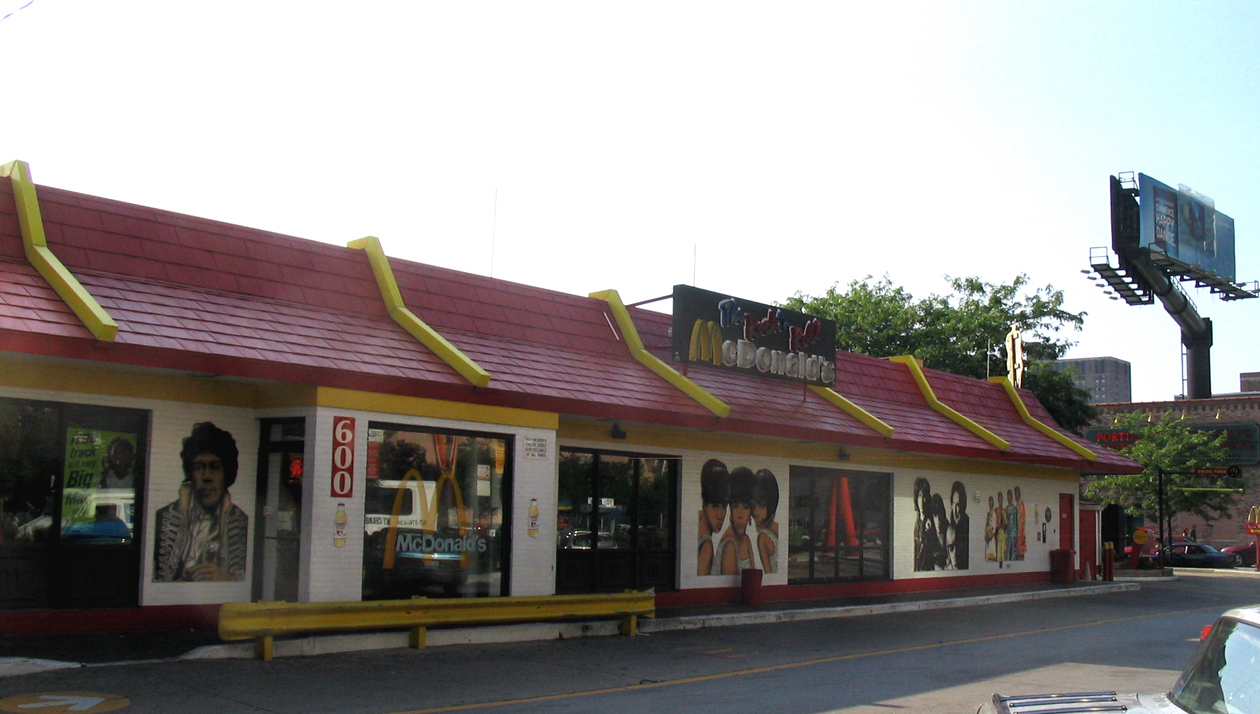
The restaurant prior to the 2004/2005 redevelopment

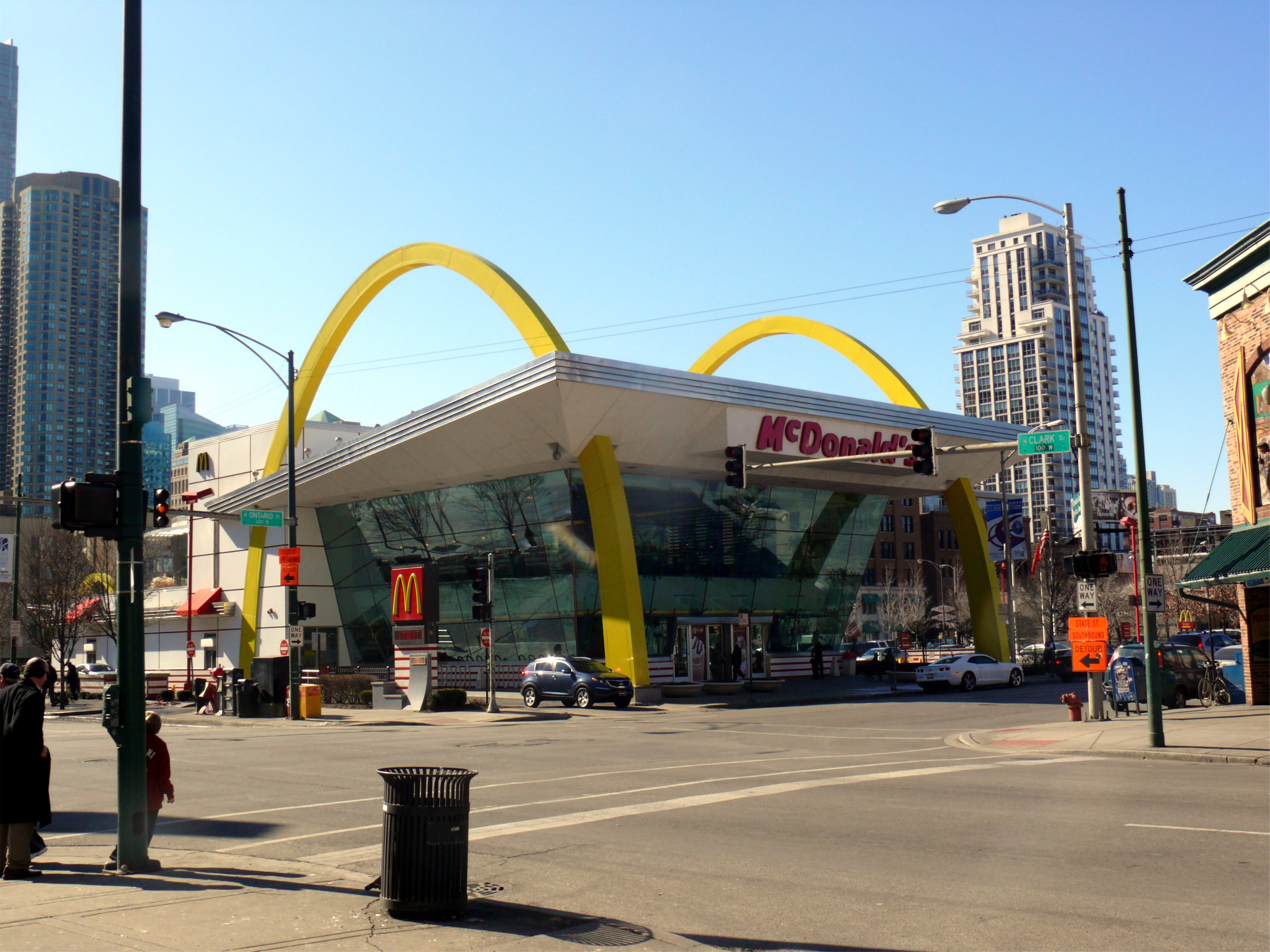
The restaurant prior to the 2018 redesign

McDonald's has had a restaurant at 600 N. Clark Street since 1983, though the new building was redeveloped and reopened on April 15, 2005 as a bi-level flagship restaurant/museum with a two lane drive through. This is the first McDonald's location with a two-lane drive-through. The reopening coincided with the 50th anniversary of the Des Plaines, Illinois restaurant which was opened by Ray Kroc on April 15, 1955. Rock N Roll McDonald's is the location where the corporation kicked off its celebration of the 50th anniversary of the franchise. Among the celebrities in attendance were Colin Powell and Elton John. At the time of the 2004 demolition, the location was the 3rd busiest in the United States and 12th in the world. In the early 1990s, it had been the busiest in the United States. It was expected to increase its sales revenue rankings from 3rd in the United States and 12th in the world with the renovation and redevelopment.

The restaurant is priced higher than other Chicago-area McDonald's, in order to subsidize the interior decor which includes numerous plasma display flat screen televisions and expensive Italian lighting. Its second floor includes a coffee bar serving lattes, gelato and biscotti and lounges that pay homage via museum display, music, and decor to every decade the chain has been in business. The 2nd floor McCafé is designed to compete with Starbucks by serving cappuccino, espresso, gelato and Italian pastries. The building features a pair of 60-foot arches and two stories worth of windows that weigh 800 pounds apiece. It has 10 cash register stations to complement its 300 patron capacity, which is about three times the normal McDonald's capacity. The restaurant has three front walls of glass.

Franchisee Marilyn Wright and her husband Ralph Wright have operated 10 McDonald's locations for the past 12 years. In addition to a perimeter of trees, the building has two green roof gardens on two levels. The lower one is visible from inside. However, the upper roof is only visible from surrounding high-rise buildings. Neither accommodates customer access. The restaurant has separate preparation lines for white meat and red meat in the giant kitchen. The demolished building faced Ohio Street, but the new building is rotated 180 degrees to face the Ontario Street tourist pedestrian strip.

==== McDonald's museum ====
The upstairs museum represented every decade of the franchise

The south (rear) half of the upstairs portion has a series of displays of early McDonald's photos, multimedia, and paraphernalia including the fast food giant's striped polyester uniforms from the 1960s. Much of it is arranged by decade going back to the mid-1950s when McDonald's first opened and is accompanied by pop culture artifacts such as pet rocks, early cell phones, and 8-track tape players. Downstairs there is a section on the first floor entitled "Chicago Firsts," featuring events and organizations that originated in Chicago.

==== Rock and roll exhibit ====
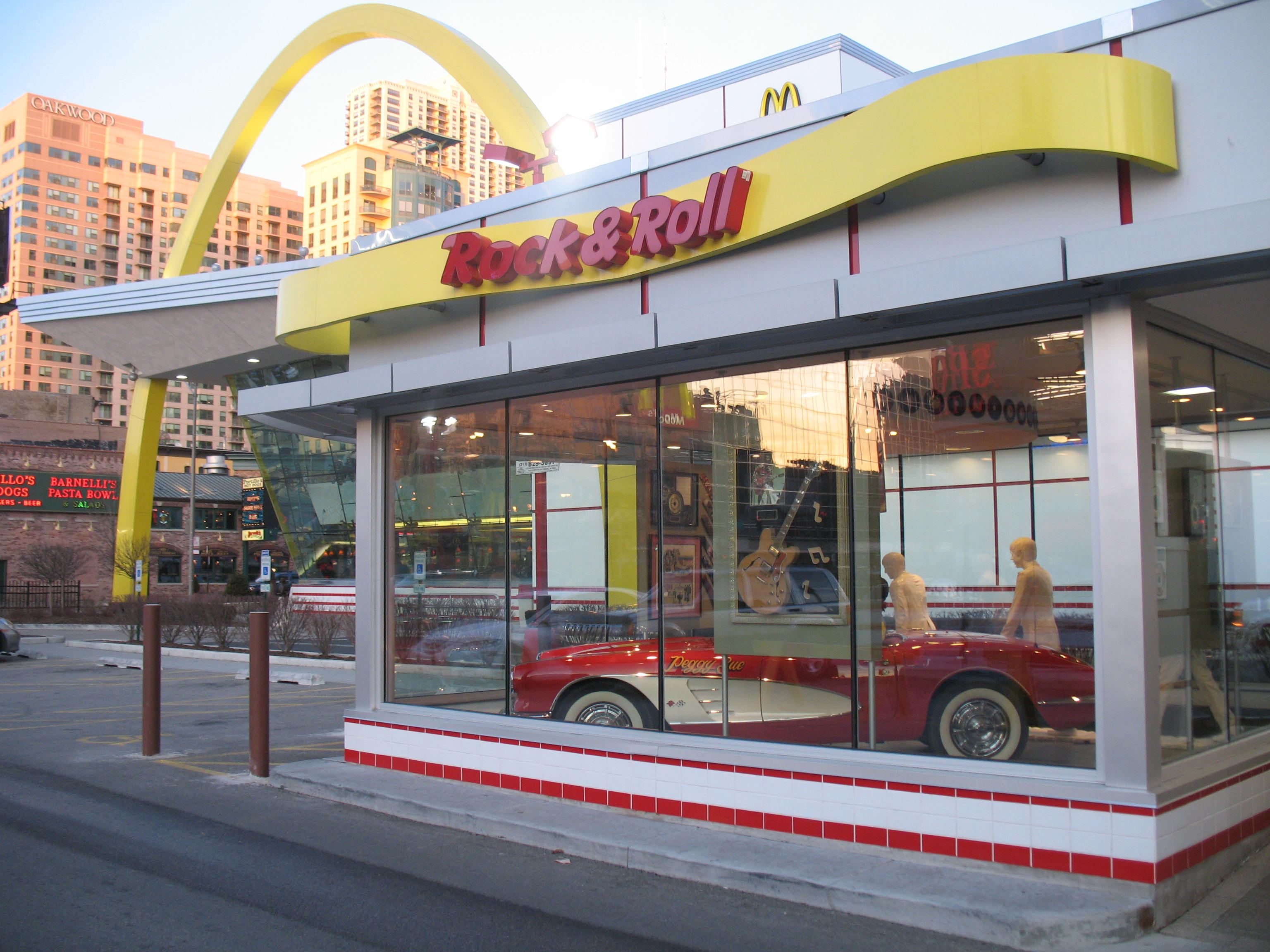
Rock & Roll exhibit

When the building had its Rock N Roll theme, the display of rock and roll memorabilia focused mainly on Elvis Presley in an exhibit in a separate structure on the same lot. The exhibit included a set of The Beatles statues reminiscent of their Abbey Road album cover. In December 2017, the museum underwent a two-fold renovation. It embarked on compliance with a company-wide modernization of stores to include self-order kiosks and table service. Additionally, the museum endeavored to remove its rock n roll nostalgia.

=== Rebuild ===
On August 8, 2018, the building opened with 19,000 square feet (1,800 m^{2}) of space on a single floor, which was 5,000 square feet (460 m^{2}) smaller than the previous two-floor structure. The building is regarded as the Chicago Flagship of McDonald's and ushers in the pro-green era of McDonald's with over 1000 solar panels, apple trees, arugula, broccoli, kale, and native grasses on the green roof as it seeks Leadership in Energy and Environmental Design platinum status recognition. The exterior eschews emphasis on the corporate red and golden colors and the interior is upgraded for modern commerce: ordering kiosks, table service and use of the mobile app. The company had moved its corporate headquarters from Oak Brook to the nearby Fulton-Randolph Market District of the Near West Side in Chicago in June 2018.

== See also ==
- List of music museums
