= Clark Street Bridge =

Bridge in Chicago, Illinois, U.S.

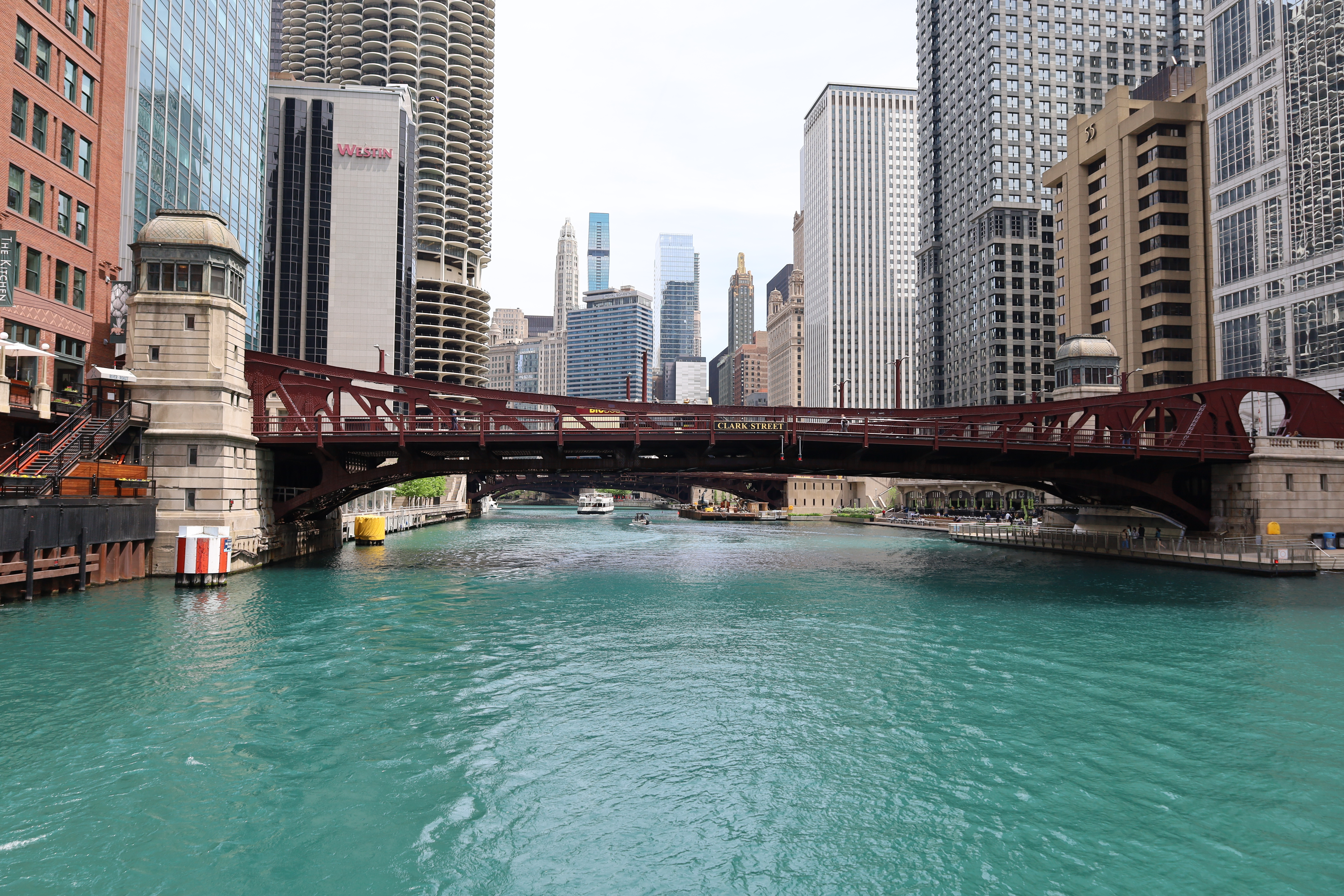
- The bridge in 2023
- Coordinates: 41.8875°N 87.6310°W
- Carries: Vehicles, pedestrians on Clark Street
- Crosses: Chicago River
- Locale: Chicago

Characteristics
- Total length: 346 feet (105 m)
- Width: 215 feet (66 m)
- Longest span: 215 feet (66 m)
- Clearance below: 20 feet (6 m)

History
- Construction end: 1929
- Opened: 1929

Location
- Interactive map of Clark Street Bridge

The Clark Street Bridge is a bascule bridge that spans the Chicago River in downtown Chicago, connecting the Near North Side with The Loop via Clark Street.

== History ==
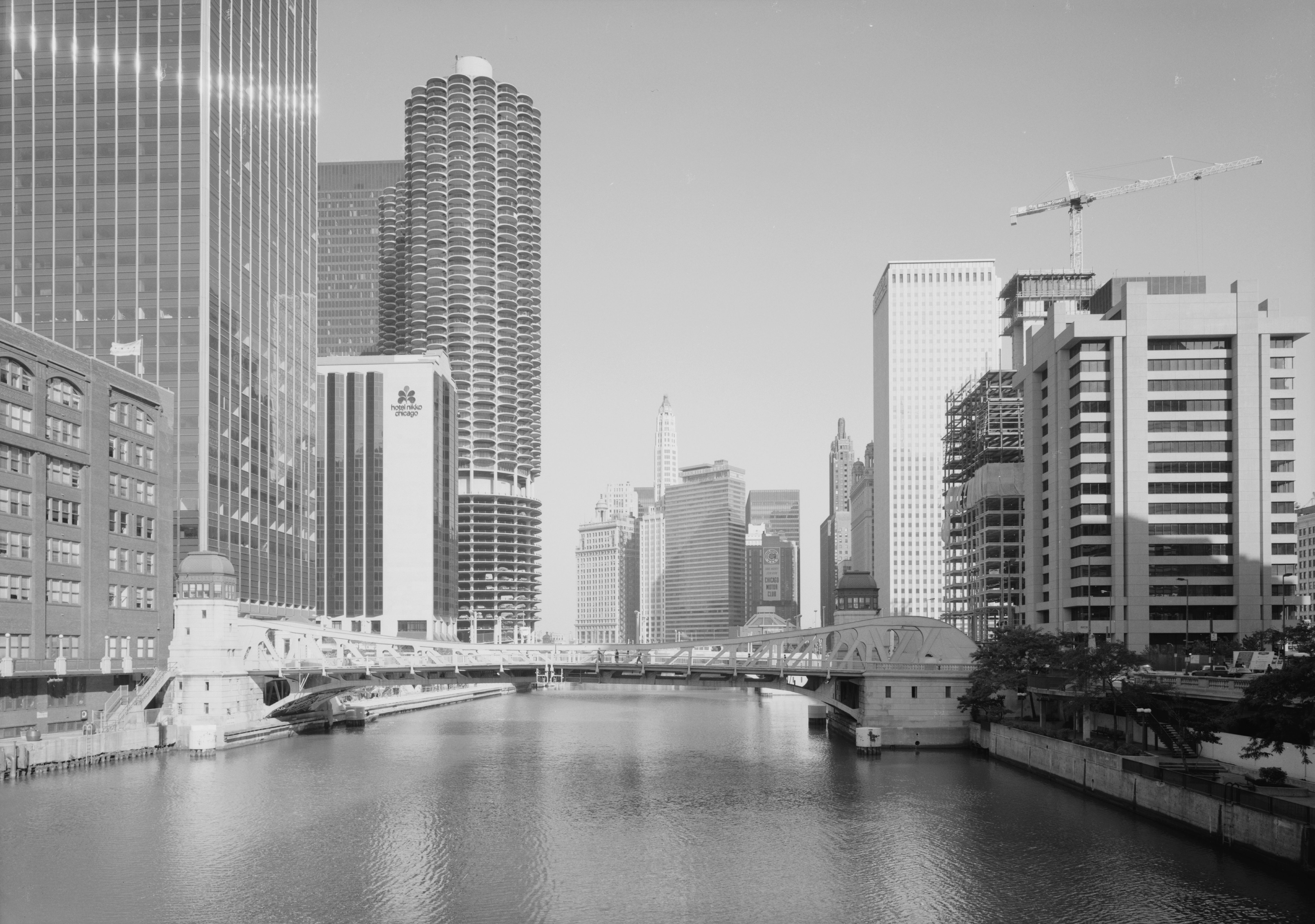
The bridge in 1987

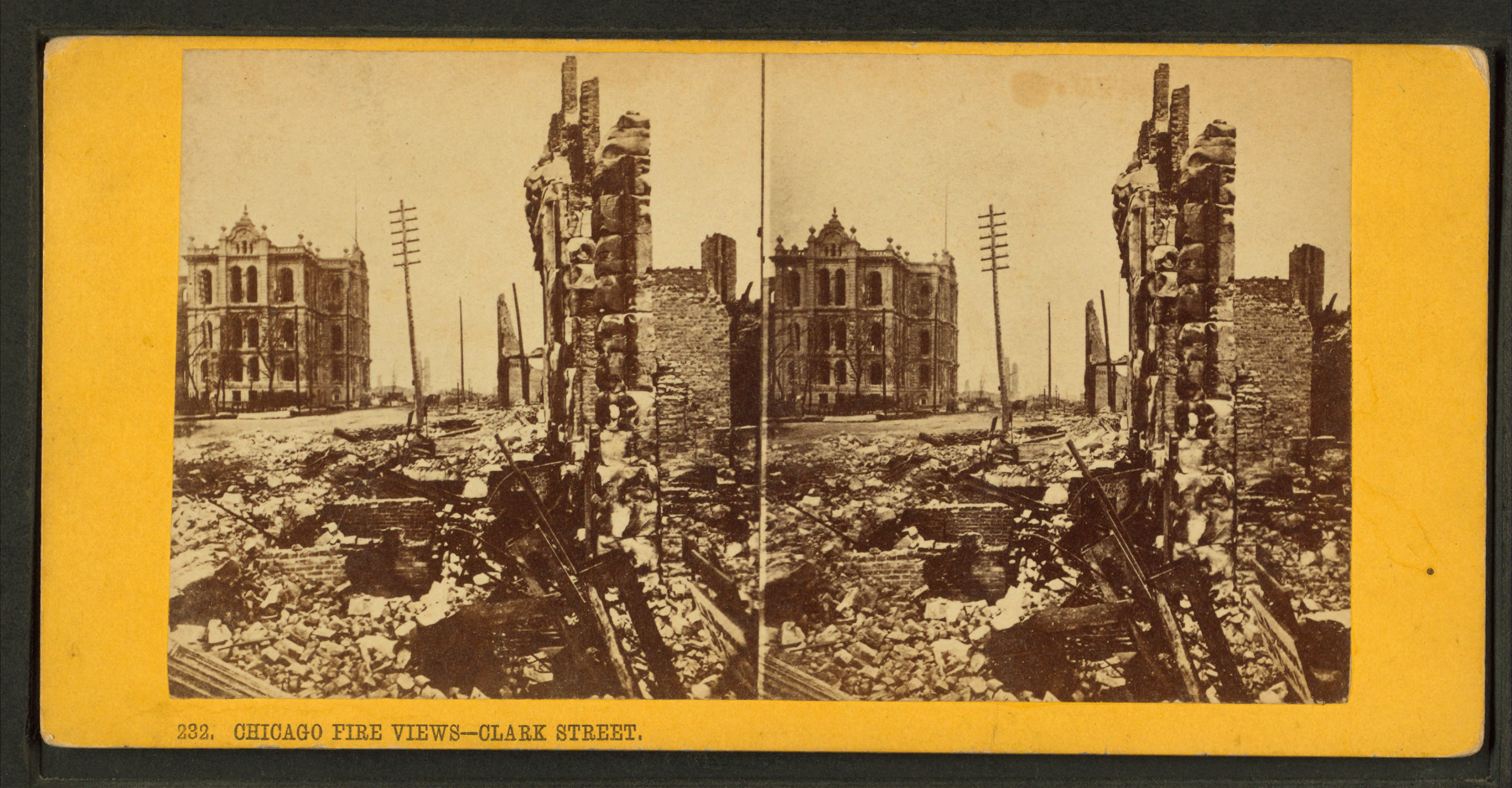
Stereoscopic image of Clark Street after the Great Chicago Fire in 1871

The current bridge, which was completed in 1929, is the eighth bridge to span the river at this point. In 1853 the bridge was struck by a steamer, called the London, and collapsed, blocking traffic on the river. The bridge was dredged and river traffic resumed on September 8, 1853. In 1854, the city approved an expenditure of $12,000 to replace the bridge with a pivot bridge. During the Lager Beer Riot in 1855, the bridge was pivoted to help contain the rioters.

On June 26, 1907, the steamer Atlas collided with the south abutment of the bridge and sank. She was declared a total loss.

The passenger ship SS Eastland was scheduled to sail from the dock at the Clark Street Bridge when she capsized on July 24, 1915, killing 844 people.

In March 2012, an unidentified man jumped from the bridge and was rescued by local high school students on a field trip. He later died of hypothermia.

== In popular culture ==
- In 1916, Carl Sandburg wrote the poem "Clark Street Bridge."
- The opening dream sequence of the Chicago-based TV show The Bear, where Carmy Berzatto releases a live bear from a cage, takes place on the Clark Street Bridge.

== See also ==
- List of bridges documented by the Historic American Engineering Record in Illinois
