= Dom Orejudos =

American artist, dancer, and choreographer (1933–1991)

- Born: Domingo Francisco Juan Esteban Orejudos, Secundo; July 1, 1933; Chicago, Illinois
- Died: September 24, 1991 (aged 58); Boulder, Colorado
- Other names: Etienne, Stephen
- Occupations: artist, ballet dancer, choreographer
- Known for: gay male erotica
- Partner(s): Chuck Renslow (1953–death); Robert Yuhnke (1969–death)

Domingo Francisco Juan Esteban "Dom" Orejudos, Secundo (July 1, 1933 – September 24, 1991), also widely known by the pen names Etienne and Stephen, was an openly gay artist, ballet dancer, and choreographer, best known for his ground-breaking gay male erotica beginning in the 1950s. Along with artists George Quaintance and Touko Laaksonen ("Tom of Finland")—with whom he became friends—Orejudos' leather-themed art promoted an image of gay men as strong and masculine, as an alternative to the then-dominant stereotype as weak and effeminate. With his first lover and business partner Chuck Renslow, Orejudos established many landmarks of late-20th-century gay male culture, including the Gold Coast bar, Man's Country bathhouse, the International Mr. Leather competition, Chicago's August White Party, and the magazines Triumph, Rawhide, and Mars. He was also active and influential in the Chicago ballet community.

== Early life ==
Dom Orejudos was born in Chicago of mixed Italian and Filipino heritage. He attended McKinley High School, where he played violin in the school orchestra, served as concertmaster in the All Chicago High School orchestra, and competed on the gymnastics team.

Orejudos was in high school when his first erotic works were published, so he chose to publish under a pen name; he reportedly desired "a pseudonym with real flair," so he chose the French version of his middle name: Etienne.

Orejudos attended the School of the Art Institute of Chicago for a semester, where he studied drawing and art, but was frustrated by the approach taught there. When he was 20 years old, he was approached on Chicago's Oak Street Beach by Chuck Renslow (then 23), who invited him to model for photographs. They began a relationship. They also founded Kris Studios, a physique photography studio that took photos for gay magazines they published. The studio was named in part to honor transgender pioneer Christine Jorgensen.

== Career ==
=== Art ===
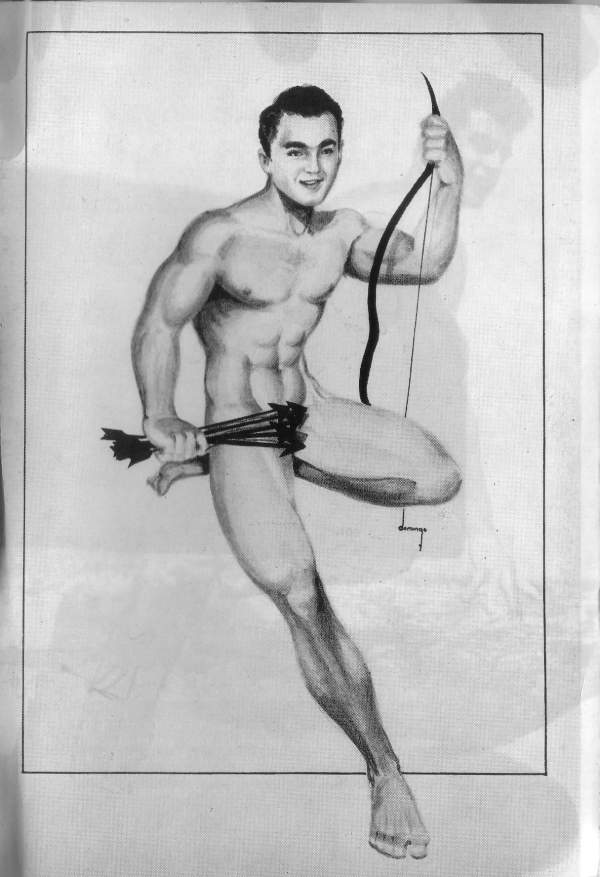
A painting of Cupid by Orejudos reproduced in the September 1953 issue of Tomorrow's Man, attributed to "the well-known Chicago artist, Etienne".

Orejudos began drawing commercially in 1953, when he was commissioned to draw erotic illustrations for Tomorrow's Man, a magazine published by Irv Johnson, the owner of the gym where he worked out. He adopted the pen name Etienne, the French equivalent of his middle name Esteban. He signed pen-and-ink drawings done in a slightly different style with Stephen, the English equivalent of his middle name, to imply that the studio employed multiple artists. The latter kind of drawings became the basis for storybooks, among the first explicit homoerotic comics published.

In 1958, Orejudos and Renslow bought the gym from Johnson, which they renamed Triumph Gymnasium and Health Studio, moving the photography studio to an upper floor. In 1963 they expanded their publishing enterprise to launch Mars, an overtly leather-focused magazine. They also produced non-explicit gay-themed 16mm movie shorts, written and directed by Orejudos.

Orejudos and Renslow lived in the Francis J. Dewes mansion in the early 1970s; Orejudos housed his art studio on the third floor. After losing much of his archive in a plumbing flood in the 1970s, he gave the remainder of it to Target Studio, which became his primary publisher. In 1978, he had a joint gallery exhibition in San Francisco with erotic artist Al Shapiro (A. Jay).

Orejudos designed the International Mr. Leather logo as well as much of the contest's advertising materials and merchandise. He also painted murals for the Gold Coast bar (with help from Chuck Arnett), Man's Country bathhouse, Zolar's, Mineshaft, and Club Baths Kansas City. Orejudos' art was widely publicized through gay magazines such as Drummer.

Orejudos was a pen pal of Tom of Finland and introduced Tom to Durk Dehner, with whom Tom founded his namesake company and foundation. Dehner considered Orejudos his "best friend for many years" and in 1999 wrote, "[Orejudos] is indelibly tied to Tom and me, and thereby the eventual creation of the Tom of Finland Foundation."

Orejudos' art has been exhibited at Fey-Way Studios, the Mary and Leigh Block Museum of Art at Northwestern University, the Chicago History Museum, the Leather Archives & Museum, and the School of the Art Institute of Chicago's Roger Brown Study Collection Center. In 1986, Orejudos was featured in Naked Eyes, an artist showcase organized by Olaf Odegaard that highlighted gay men's visual art for the International Gay and Lesbian Archives.

=== Ballet ===
Orejudos attended Ellis-DuBoulay School of Ballet on a scholarship, and then joined the Illinois Ballet Company, where he was principal dancer for nine years and became resident choreographer. After the Illinois Ballet closed in 1972, he created new choreography for another decade working with the Delta Festival Ballet company in New Orleans. He created 18 ballets, staged by 20 regional ballet companies including Washington, D.C., Atlanta, Houston, Minneapolis, San Francisco, and Omaha. He received three grants from the National Endowment for the Arts. He staged his ballet Charioteer to inaugurate color broadcasts by Chicago station WTTW, which received three Emmy Awards. He danced in the touring companies for West Side Story, The King and I, and Song of Norway.

== Personal life ==
In addition to his relationship with Chuck Renslow, in 1969 Orejudos met Robert (Bob) Yuhnke at a leather party in New York. They developed a long-distance relationship until Yuhnke moved to Chicago in 1979 to live with him. Together they established a residence in Eldorado Springs, Colorado, in 1980, where they resided until Orejudos's death from complications of AIDS. Orejudos continued to spend time in Chicago until his mother's death in 1984.

Orejudos contracted pneumonia during travel with Yuhnke in China before joining other members of a Sister City delegation from Boulder for a planned visit to Lhasa, Tibet in 1987. This illness revealed a diagnosis of AIDS that contributed to his declining health, leading to his death from AIDS complications on September 24, 1991. Orejudos has been honored with three separate panels in the AIDS Memorial Quilt.

== Cultural impact & legacy ==
Orejudos is among those commemorated in the AIDS Memorial Quilt. In 1993 Orejudos received the Forebear Award as part of the Pantheon of Leather Awards. In 2013 Orejudos was inducted into the Leather Hall of Fame.

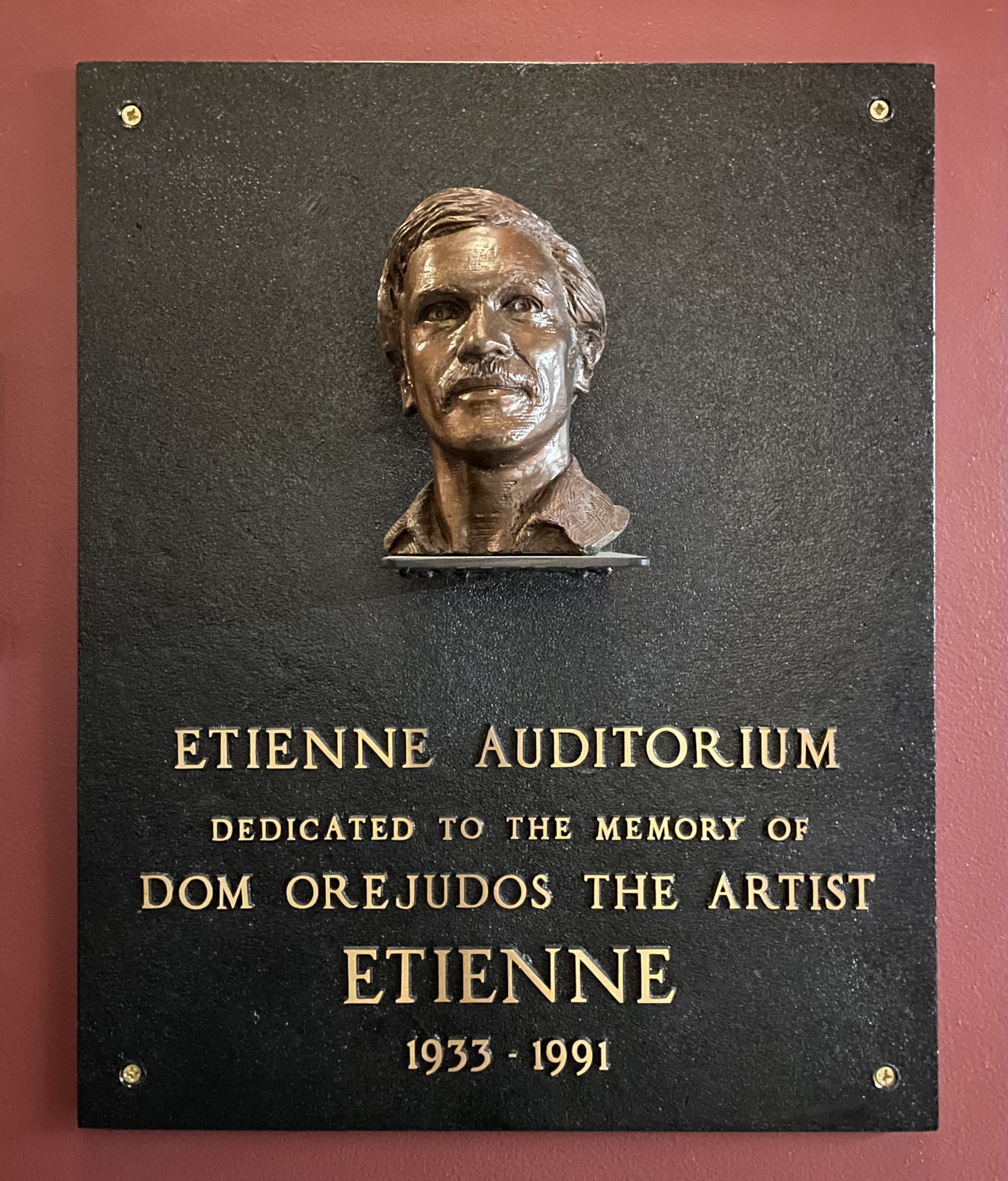
Etienne Auditorium plaque in the Leather Archives & Museum, Chicago

The Leather Archives & Museum (LA&M) has the largest collection of original works by Orejudos (under his pseudonym "Etienne"). The LA&M itself was founded by Renslow in large part to display and preserve Orejudos' art. Its auditorium, which features many of his murals, in named in his honor. LA&M periodically sells merchandise featuring Orejudos' art.

Orejudos's art considerably influenced the style of other erotic artists including Bill Schmeling.

In 1999, Dehner wrote:

I'm sure that Etienne will go [d]own in homoerotic history as being the quintessential humorist. His typical formats have one or more characters as the brunt of the joke, many times under severe physical torment, all for the sexual gratification of another of his ruffians. His relaxed mastery of figurative cartoon illustration, along with a superb ability for gutter dialogue, produced the kind of stories that we were always wishing for when reading Flash Gordon and Spider Man, but never got until Etienne/Stephen entered our lives.

In 2006, historian Jack Fritscher wrote:

"If there is a gay Mount Rushmore of four great pioneer pop artists, the faces would be Chuck Arnett, Etienne, A. Jay, and Tom of Finland."

In 2018, fashion label JW Anderson released a collection inspired by Orejudos. That same year, Dazed magazine reported:

The reason Orejudos' sexed-up leather boys are still being celebrated today is that they flipped the assumption that heterosexuality and masculinity are always linked. The men in his illustrations are hyper-muscular, their arms inflated to gigantic proportions and their dicks big enough to destroy even the most experienced sexual partner. These were parodies of masculinity with a sexy, tongue-in-cheek twist: it's this disruptive attitude that earned him a reputation as a true queer trailblazer.
