= Chuck Renslow =

American businessperson and gay culture pioneer (1929 – 2017)

- Man's Country tribute (the flag behind Renslow is a leather pride flag)
- Born: Charles Renslow; August 26, 1929; Chicago, Illinois
- Died: June 29, 2017 (aged 87)
- Occupation: Businessperson
- Known for: Gay activism and institution-building
- Partner(s): Dom Orejudos, Ron Ehemann

Charles "Chuck" Renslow (August 26, 1929 – June 29, 2017) was an American businessman, known for pioneering homoerotic male photography in the mid-20th-century US, and establishing many landmarks of late-20th-century gay culture and leather culture, especially in the Chicago area. His accomplishments included the co-founding with Tony DeBlase of the Leather Archives & Museum, the co-founding with Dom Orejudos of the Gold Coast bar and Man's Country bathhouse, and the founding by himself alone of Chicago's August White Party, and the magazines Triumph, Rawhide, and Mars. He was a romantic partner of Dom Orejudos as well as Chuck Arnett, Samuel Steward, David Grooms, and Ron Ehemann.

== Career ==
Renslow was a photographer, and in 1952 met Dom Orejudos on Chicago's Oak Street Beach, asking him to model for him. The two began a lifelong personal and professional relationship; in the 1970s, they lived together in the Francis J Dewes mansion.

Renslow and Orejudos founded Kris Studios, a physique photography studio that took photos for gay magazines they published. The studio was named in part to honor transgender pioneer Christine Jorgensen. In 1958, they bought a gym which they renamed Triumph Gymnasium and Health Studio. That same year Renslow and Herbie Schmidt and Art Marotta bought Gold Coast Show Lounge, and transformed it into a gay leather bar, called the Gold Coast bar, with a uniform/western/leather dress code, a backroom, and homoerotic art by Orejudos and Chuck Arnett on the walls. In 1965, Renslow helped found the Second City Motorcycle Club.

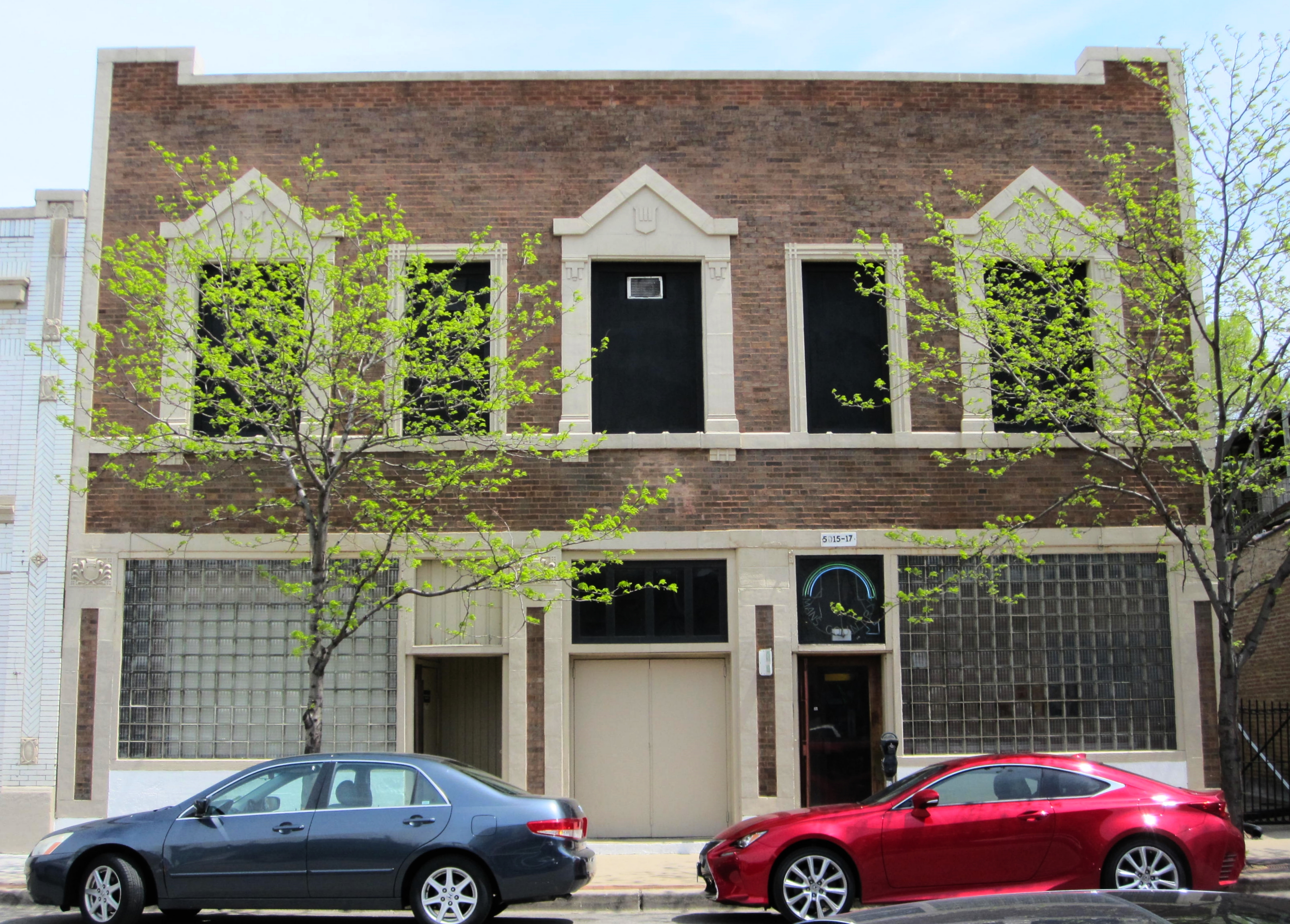
Renslow and Dom Orejudos founded the Man's Country/Chicago bathhouse in 1973 (pictured here in 2016).

Man's Country/Chicago, founded by Renslow and Orejudos, opened at 5015–5017 North Clark Street in Chicago on September 19, 1973, and held the title of Chicago's longest-running gay bathhouse when it closed in 2017. It was the third bathhouse co-founded by Renslow, whose previous two clubs were forced to shut down due to homophobia-fueled pressure from the police. Before opening Man's Country/Chicago, Renslow co-owned locations of the Club Baths chain in Chicago, Kansas City, and Phoenix with Chuck Fleck.

Renslow founded Chicago's August White Party on August 8, 1974, when he hosted a party to celebrate his birthday and thank his patrons. It was then held for the next 36 years until 2010. The largest party was held in 1979 at Navy Pier, with 5,000 participants.

The forerunner of the International Mr. Leather competition was the 1970s "Mr. Gold Coast" contest held at Chicago's Gold Coast leather bar, owned by Renslow and Dom Orejudos. The "Mr. Gold Coast" contest became one of the bar's most popular promotions causing the need to locate the competition to a larger venue in 1979, upon which the title was changed to International Mr. Leather.

Renslow founded the Chicago Eagle bar. Originally the bar was housed within the Man's Country complex.

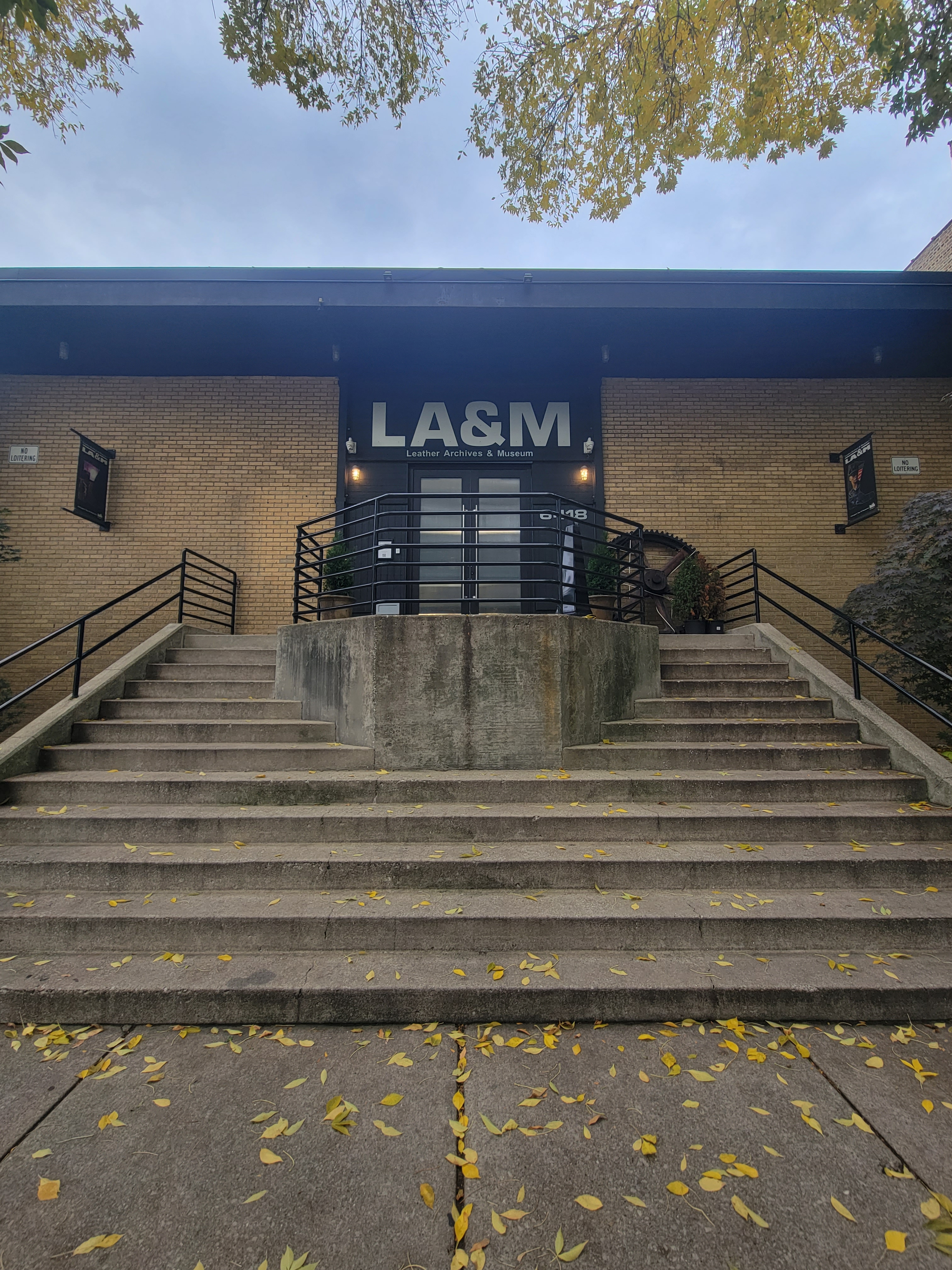
Renslow and Tony DeBlase founded the Leather Archives & Museum in 1991 (its entrance is pictured here in a 2023 photo).

In 1991, Renslow and Tony DeBlase founded the Leather Archives & Museum "as a community archives, library, and museum of leather, kink, fetish, and BDSM history and culture." Its mission is making “leather, kink, BDSM, and fetish accessible through research, preservation, education and community engagement." Renslow and DeBlase founded the museum in response to the AIDS crisis, during which the leather and fetish communities' history and belongings were frequently lost or intentionally suppressed and discarded.

== Honors and legacy ==
Renslow is listed as the Chairman In Memoriam of the Leather Archives & Museum. The museum also gives out the Chuck Renslow President's Award to honor individuals and organizations for their contributions to it.

According to cultural anthropologist Gayle Rubin:

Chuck was one of the most consequential leathermen of the long 20th century; his impact was vast and spanned many decades. He left indelible marks on so many areas of leather social life, among them: producing iconic gay male erotica, running one of the earliest and longest lasting leather bars, and building the leather contest system from a big but mostly local party into a major international institution. But to my mind, his most significant contribution was his role in establishing and maintaining the Leather Archives and Museum. Chuck gave the LA&M its legal corporate structure, but in addition he quietly made sure it had enough funds to operate for many years. He also made the LA&M the ongoing beneficiary of IML. Although many others, such as Tony DeBlase, made key contributions to the LA&M, Chuck did more than any other single individual to grow the LA&M and to secure its future. In doing so, he made it possible to secure a future for the leather past.

In 1990, Renslow received the Steve Maidhof Award for National or International Work from the National Leather Association International.

In 1991, Renslow was inducted into the Chicago LGBT Hall of Fame.

In 1992, he received the President's Award as part of the Pantheon of Leather Awards.

In 1993, he received the Lifetime Achievement Award as part of the Pantheon of Leather Awards.

In 1995, "Chuck Renslow – IML" was one of the recipients of the International Deaf Leather Recognition Award.

In 1996, he and Jim McGlade received the Lifetime Achievement Award as part of the Pantheon of Leather Awards, and in 2007 Renslow received it alone.

In 1998, he received the Forebear Award as part of the Pantheon of Leather Awards.

In 2009, he was inducted into the Leather Hall of Fame.

On May 25, 2018, the Chicago City Council voted to honorarily designate the eastern stretch of Clark Street between Winnemac Avenue and Ainslie Avenue as "Chuck Renslow Way." (That stretch of Clark Street was previously home to many of Renslow's businesses, including the Gold Coast, Man's Country and Chicago Eagle.) The new street sign was unveiled on the anniversary of IML.

In June 2019, Renslow was one of the inaugural fifty American "pioneers, trailblazers, and heroes" inducted on the National LGBTQ Wall of Honor within the Stonewall National Monument (SNM) in New York City's Stonewall Inn. The SNM is the first U.S. national monument dedicated to LGBTQ rights and history, and the wall's unveiling was timed to take place during the 50th anniversary of the Stonewall riots.

In 2021, the Leather Archives & Museum gave out the Chuck Renslow & Tony DeBlase Founders’ Award.
