= Clark Street (Chicago) =

Major north–south thoroughfare in Chicago, Illinois, United States

- George R. Clark Street; 100 West (in the Loop)
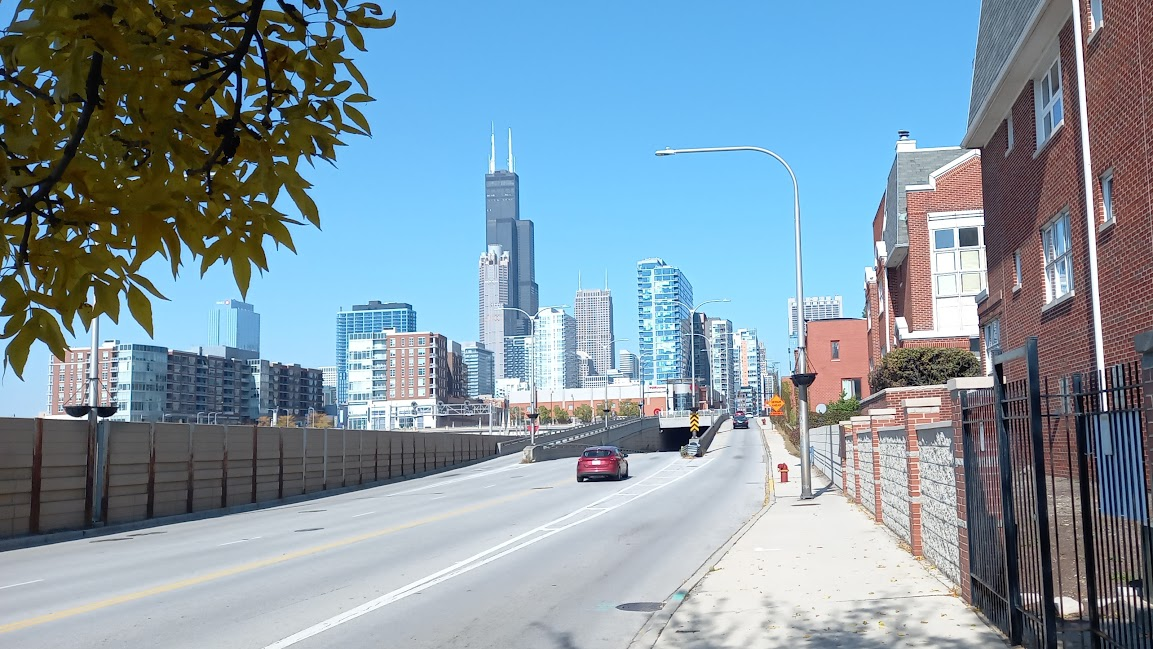
- Clark Street at the Roosevelt Road interchange (October 2022)
- Interactive map of Clark Street
- Location: Cook County, Illinois, United States
- South end: Cermak Road (2200 S)
- North end: Howard Street (7600 N) at the Chicago/Evanston border

Construction
- Inauguration: 1830

Clark Street is a north–south street in Chicago, Illinois, that runs close to the shore of Lake Michigan from the northern city boundary with Evanston, to 2200 South in the city street numbering system. At its northern end, Clark Street is at 1800 West; however the street runs diagonally through the Chicago grid for about 8 miles (13 km) to North Avenue (1600 N) and then runs at 100 West for the rest of its course south to Cermak Road. It is also seen in Riverdale beyond 127th street across the Calumet River, along with other nearby streets that ended just south of the Loop. The major length of Clark Street runs a total of 98 blocks.

== History ==
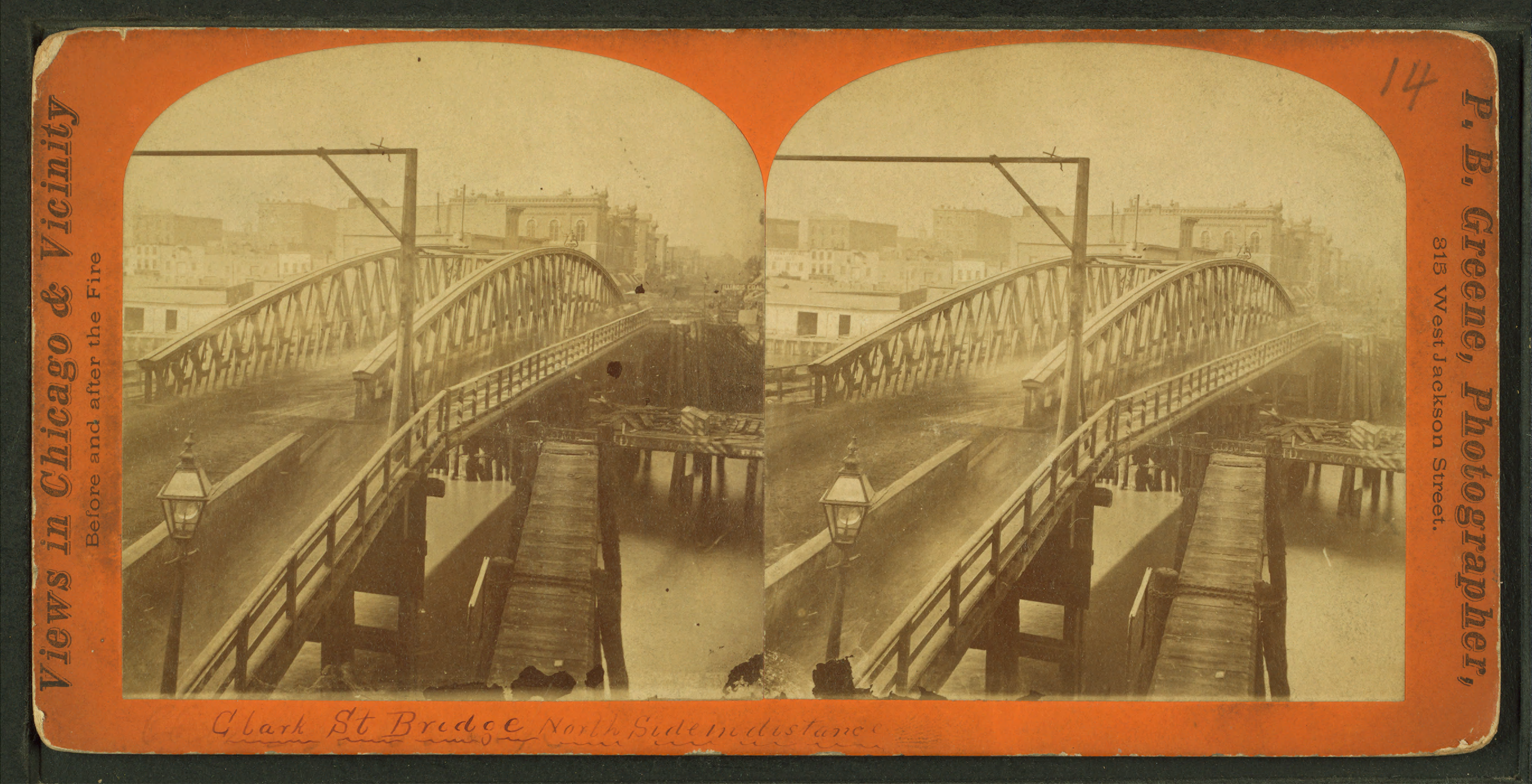
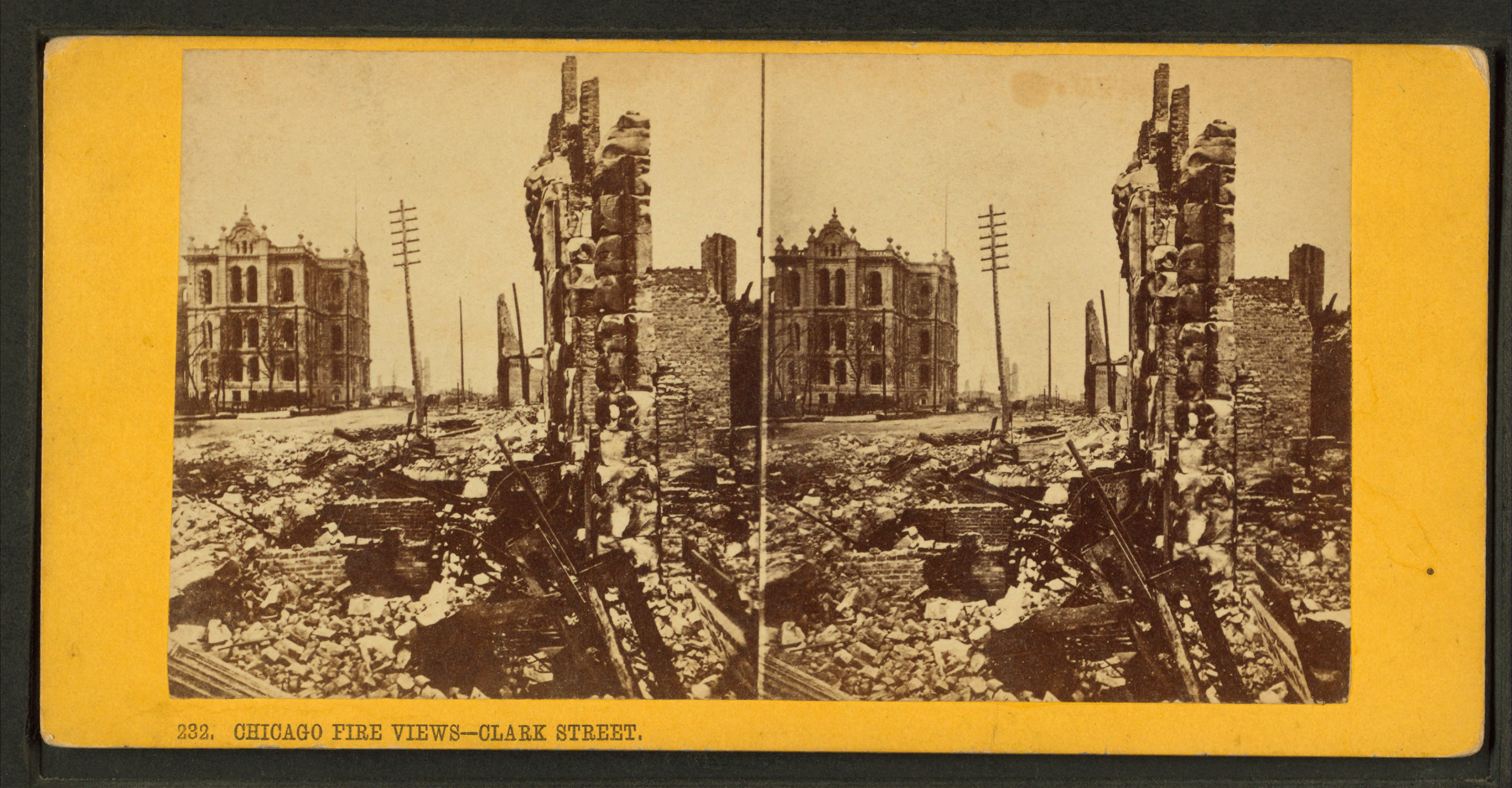
Stereoscopic images of Clark Street before (top) and after (bottom) the Great Chicago Fire

Clark Street is named for George Rogers Clark, an American Revolutionary War soldier who captured much of the Northwest Territory from the British. Within the Chicago Loop Clark Street is one of the original streets laid out by James Thompson in his 1830 plat of Chicago. North of the Loop, from North Avenue, it roughly follows part of the path of an Indian trail called Green Bay trail (later Green Bay Road) that ran all the way to Green Bay, Wisconsin.

In the 1950s Clark Street between Ohio and Armitage Streets was a substantial neighborhood barrio home to the first Puerto Ricans in Chicago. It was unofficially known as La Clark by the Puerto Ricans that lived there arriving from the steel mills of Indiana and rural migrant camps. This was primarily during the Great Migration and war effort during and after World War II. They worked at the downtown hotels, the meat packing plants and the nearby factories then located near downtown industrial areas. Many original members of the Young Lords, a former street gang that transformed into a Latino civil and human rights movement, were sons and daughters of these immigrants and grew up in La Clark. The City of Chicago orchestrated the gentrification of the Old Town and, in turn, the Lincoln Park areas, ultimately leading to the relocation of the Latin community to lower-cost neighborhoods.

The eastern stretch of Clark Street between Winnemac Avenue and Ainslie Avenue was home to many of Chuck Renslow’s businesses, including the Gold Coast and Man's Country. On May 25, 2018, the Chicago City Council voted to honorarily designate that part of the street as "Chuck Renslow Way."

== Points of interest ==
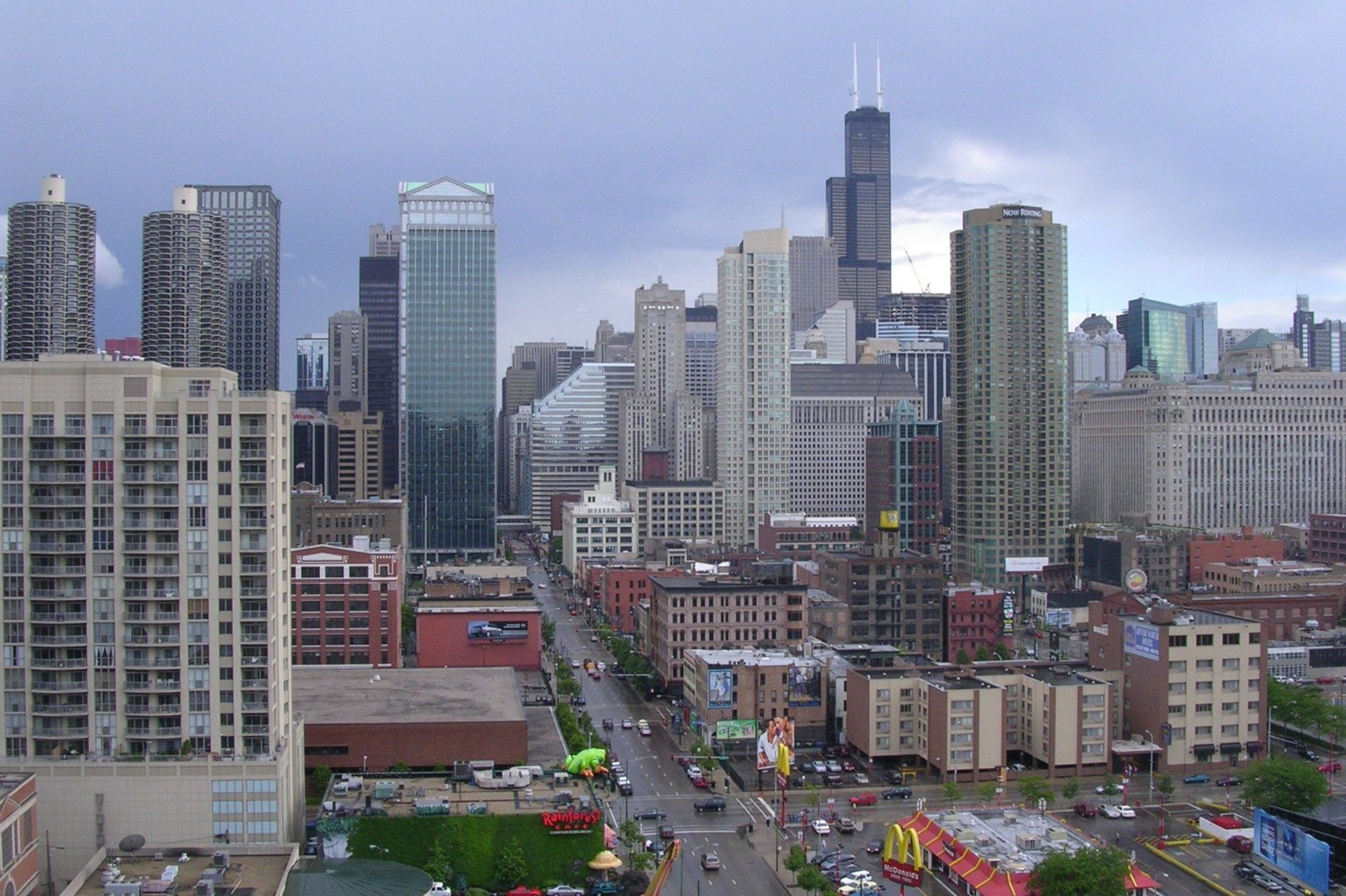
Clark Street looking south with LaSalle-Wacker Building, Rainforest Cafe, Rock N Roll McDonald's and Willis Tower in the background on July 17, 2004.

From the intersection with Ashland Avenue south to Ainslie Street, Clark Street passes through the Andersonville Commercial Historic District. Graceland Cemetery is on the east side of Clark Street from Montrose Avenue to its entrance at Irving Park Road. The Metro concert hall is located at 3730 North Clark Street, 1 1/2 blocks north of Addison Street. At the intersection of Clark and Addison is Wrigley Field, home of the Chicago Cubs baseball team and also occasionally used as a concert venue. Another commercial strip on Clark Street stretches from Diversey Parkway south to Armitage Avenue. 2122 North Clark Street was the site of the Saint Valentine's Day massacre, although the building no longer stands. Further to the south, Clark Street borders Lincoln Park for 0.6 miles until it reaches North Avenue and the Chicago History Museum. The street then passes through the Near North Side, where in the River North neighborhood it passes the Rock N Roll McDonald's. Then it continues over the Chicago River at the Clark Street Bridge and through the Loop, where it passes the Thompson Center and its Monument with Standing Beast. Clark Street continues between the City Hall-County Building and the Daley Center and on to its termination at Cermak Road.

== Transportation ==
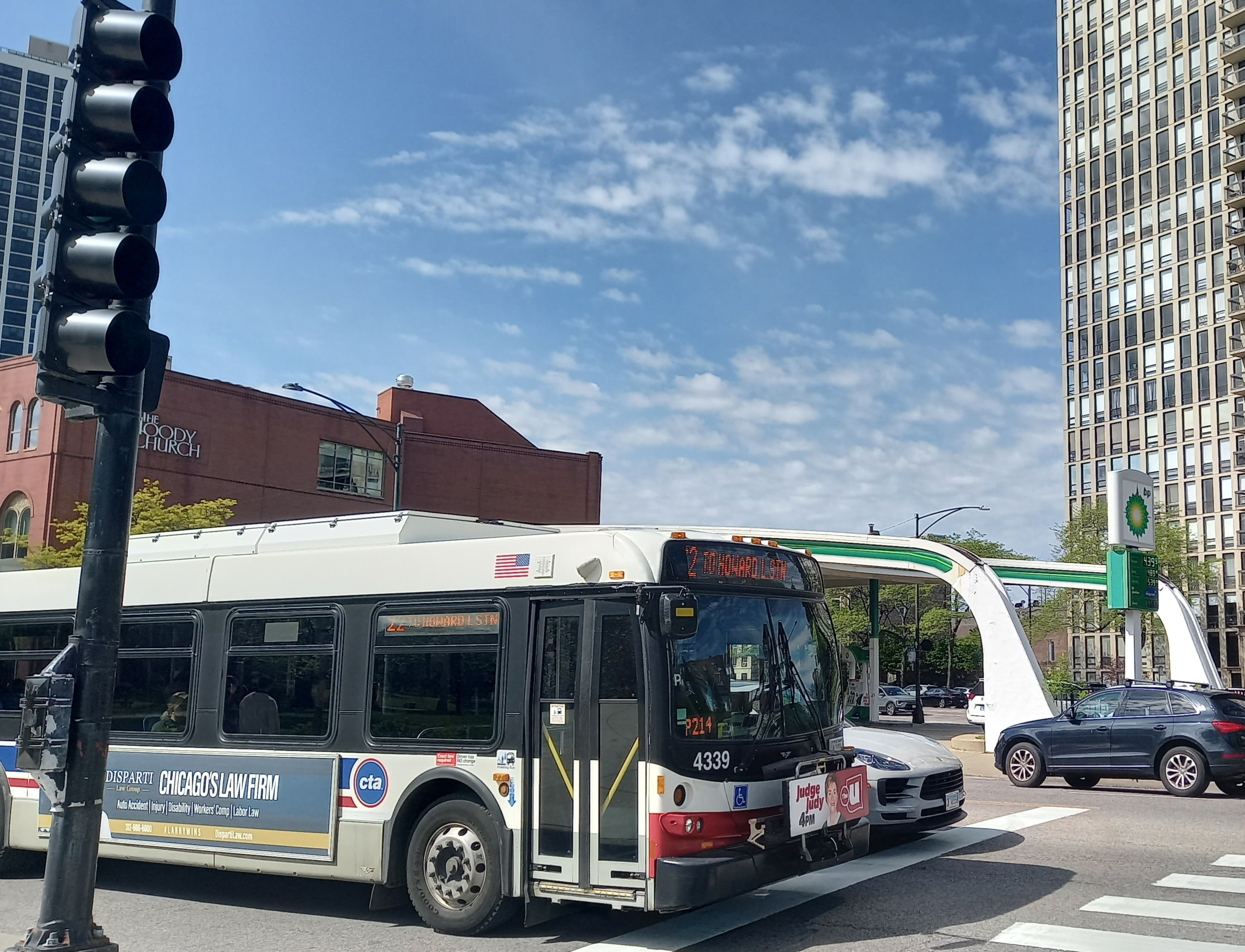
CTA route 22 bus at Clark Street and LaSalle Drive

The CTA's 22 Clark bus route offers 24/7 service down Clark Street from Howard Street to Harrison Street; northbound buses travel along Dearborn Street from Polk Street to Walton Street (Washington Square Park). The route also provides connections to the "L" at Howard, Addison, Belmont, Clark/Division, Clark/Lake, LaSalle/Van Buren, and LaSalle.

South of Polk Street, CTA bus route 24 is the sole CTA bus route along Clark Street (along with Pace bus routes 850, 851, and 855) before leaving at Archer Avenue east of Cermak–Chinatown station.

== Major intersections ==
The entire route is in Cook County.

Location	mi	km	Destinations	Notes
Evanston–Chicago line	0.0	0.0	Howard Street	Northern terminus; roadway continues as Chicago Avenue
Chicago	2.1	3.4	US 14 (N Ridge Avenue)	
Chicago	3.0	4.8	US 41 (W Foster Avenue)	
Chicago	4.6	7.4	IL 19 (W Irving Park Road)	
Chicago	7.8	12.6	IL 64 (W LaSalle Drive)	
Chicago	9.6	15.4	Clark Street Bridge	
Chicago	11.0	17.7	W Roosevelt Road	Interchange
Chicago	12.0	19.3	W Cermak Road	Southern terminus
1.000 mi = 1.609 km; 1.000 km = 0.621 mi

== Gallery ==
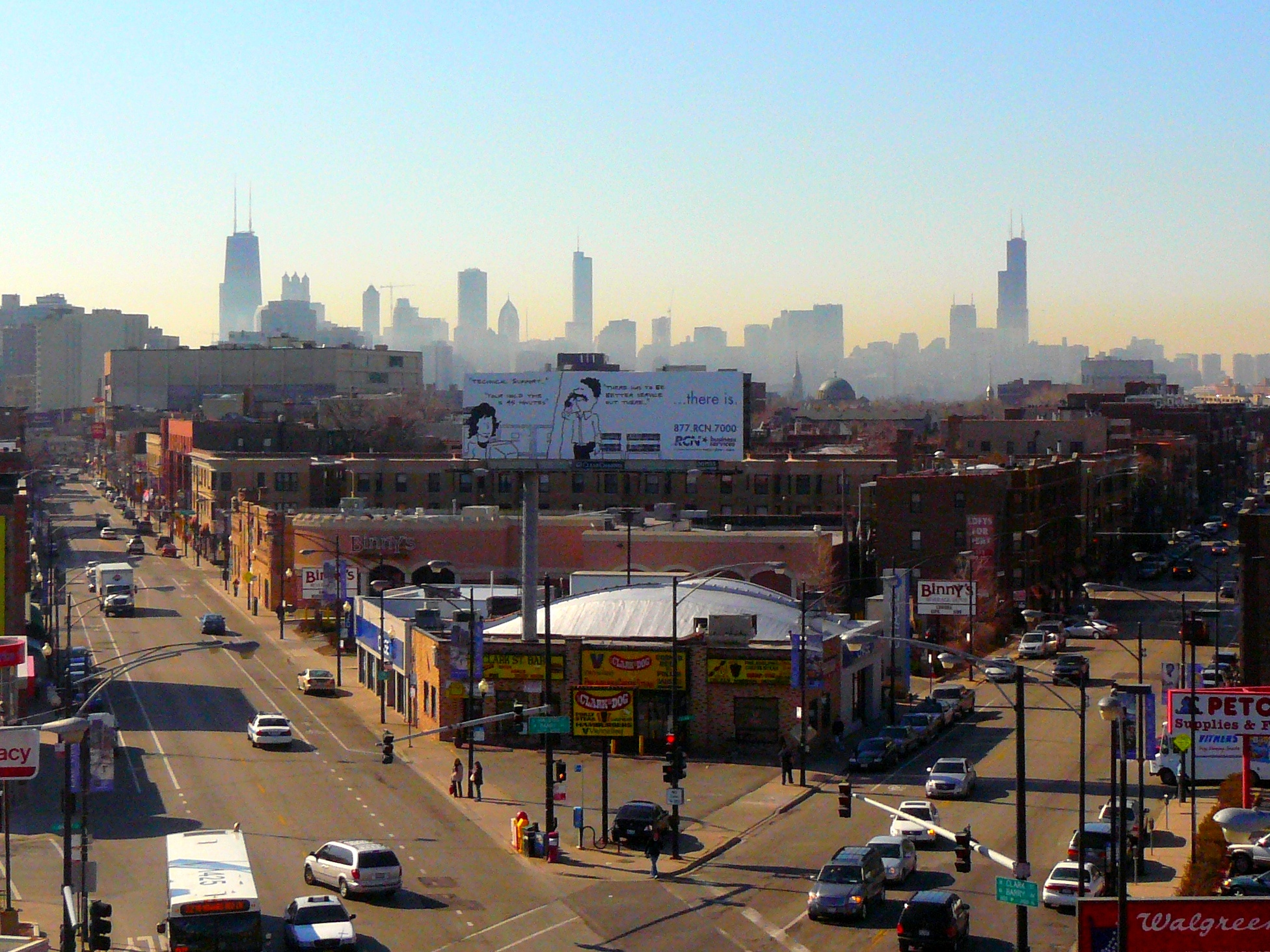
the intersection of Clark and Halsted in 2009, Clark is on the left

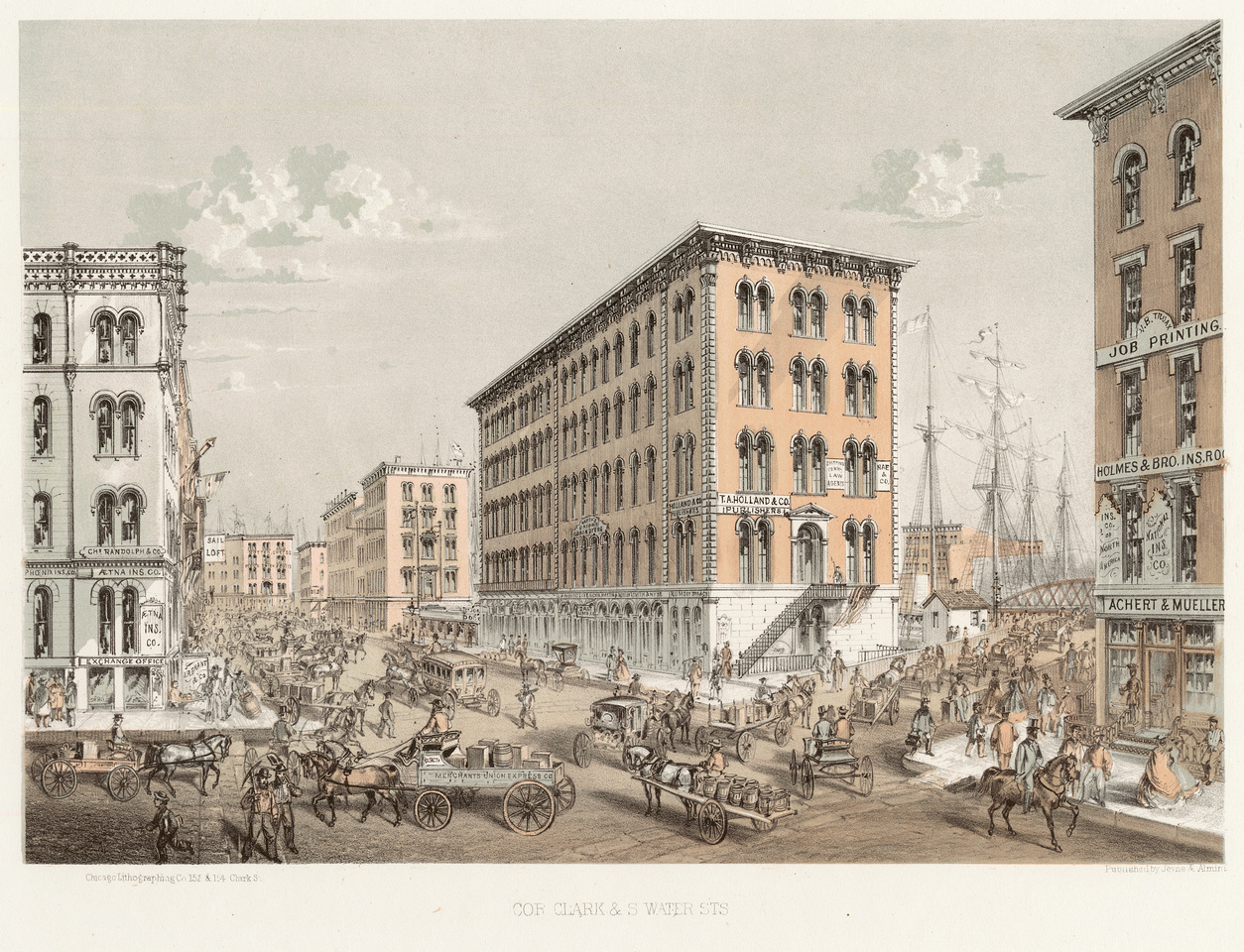
Clark and South Water Streets in 1865

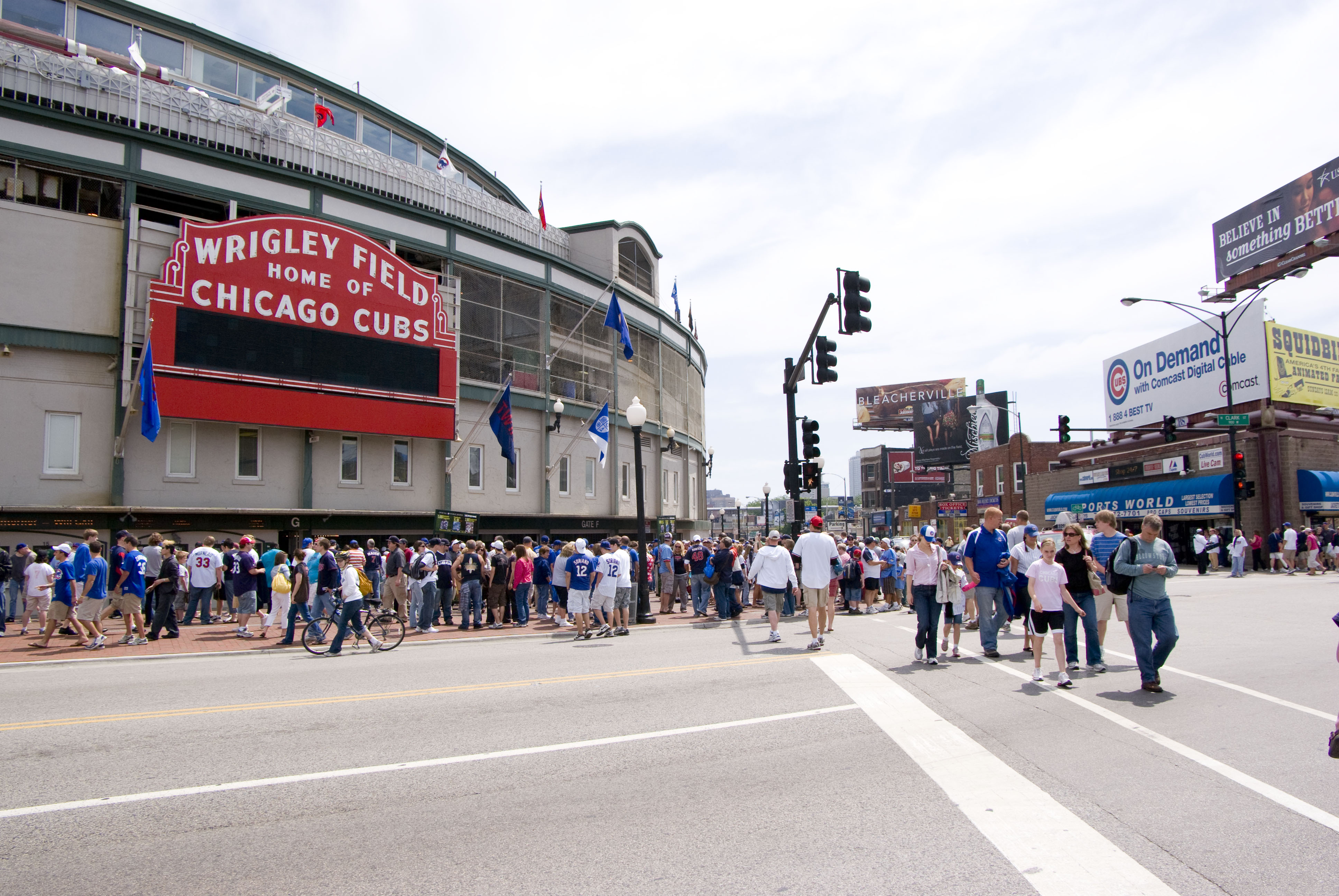
Clark Street passes by Wrigley Field

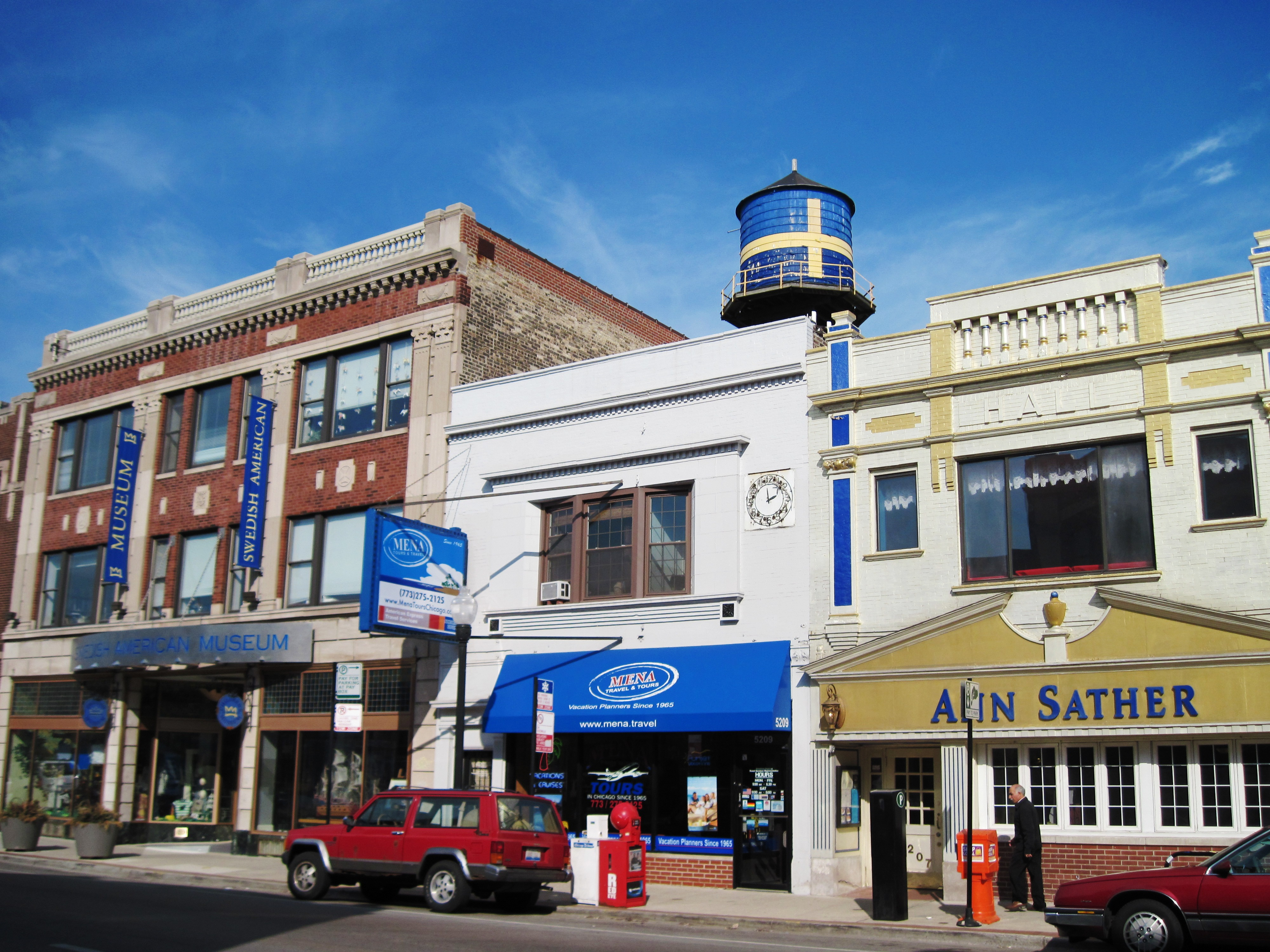
A view of Clark Street in Andersonville

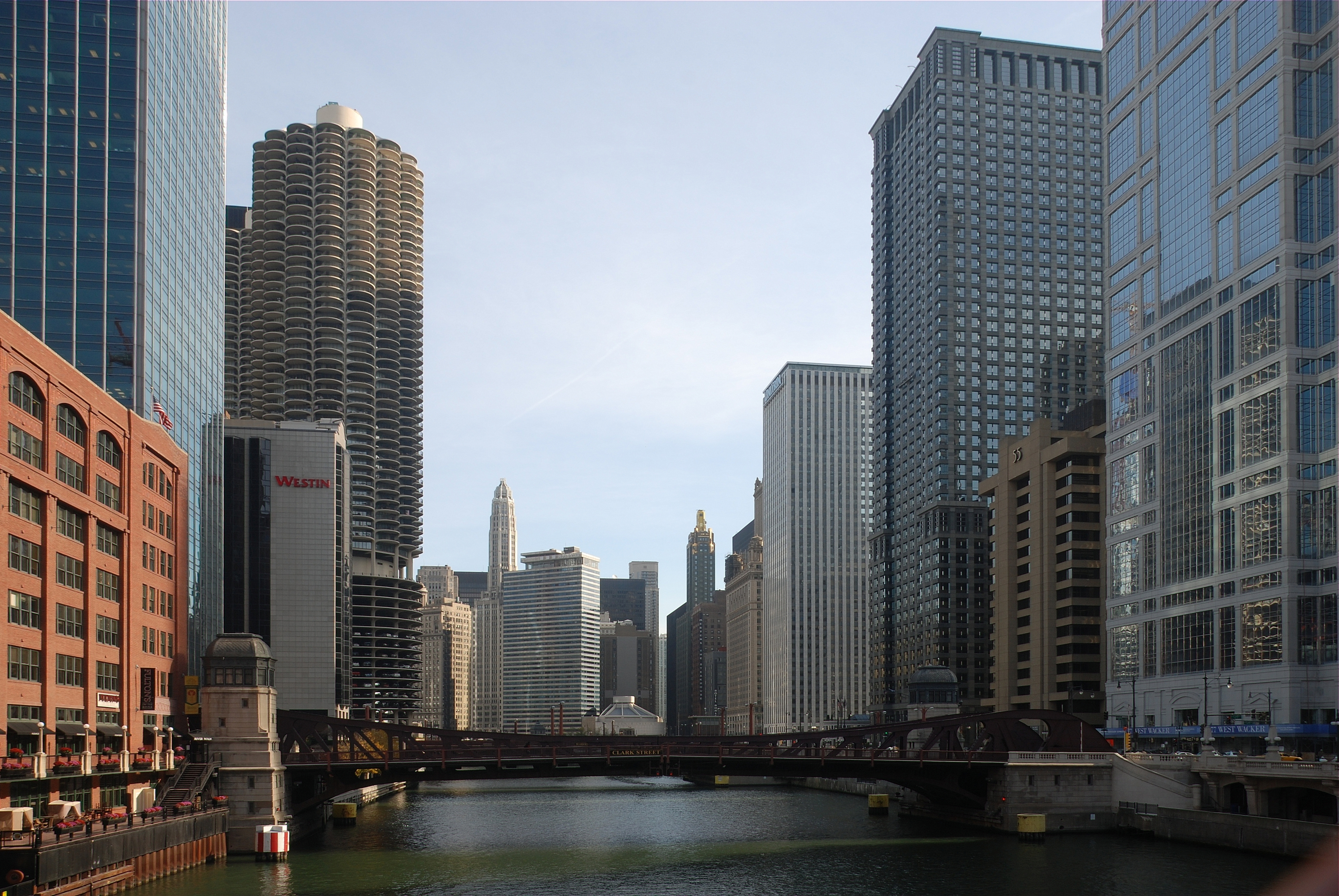
Clark Street bridge in 2007

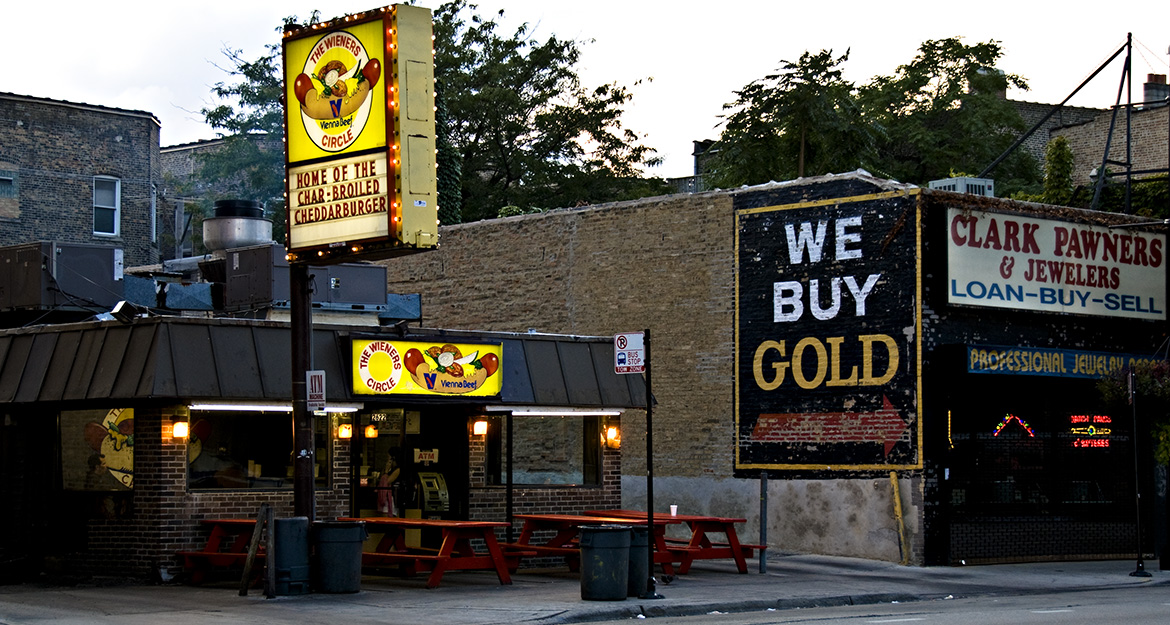
The Wieners Circle hot dog stand is on 2622 North Clark

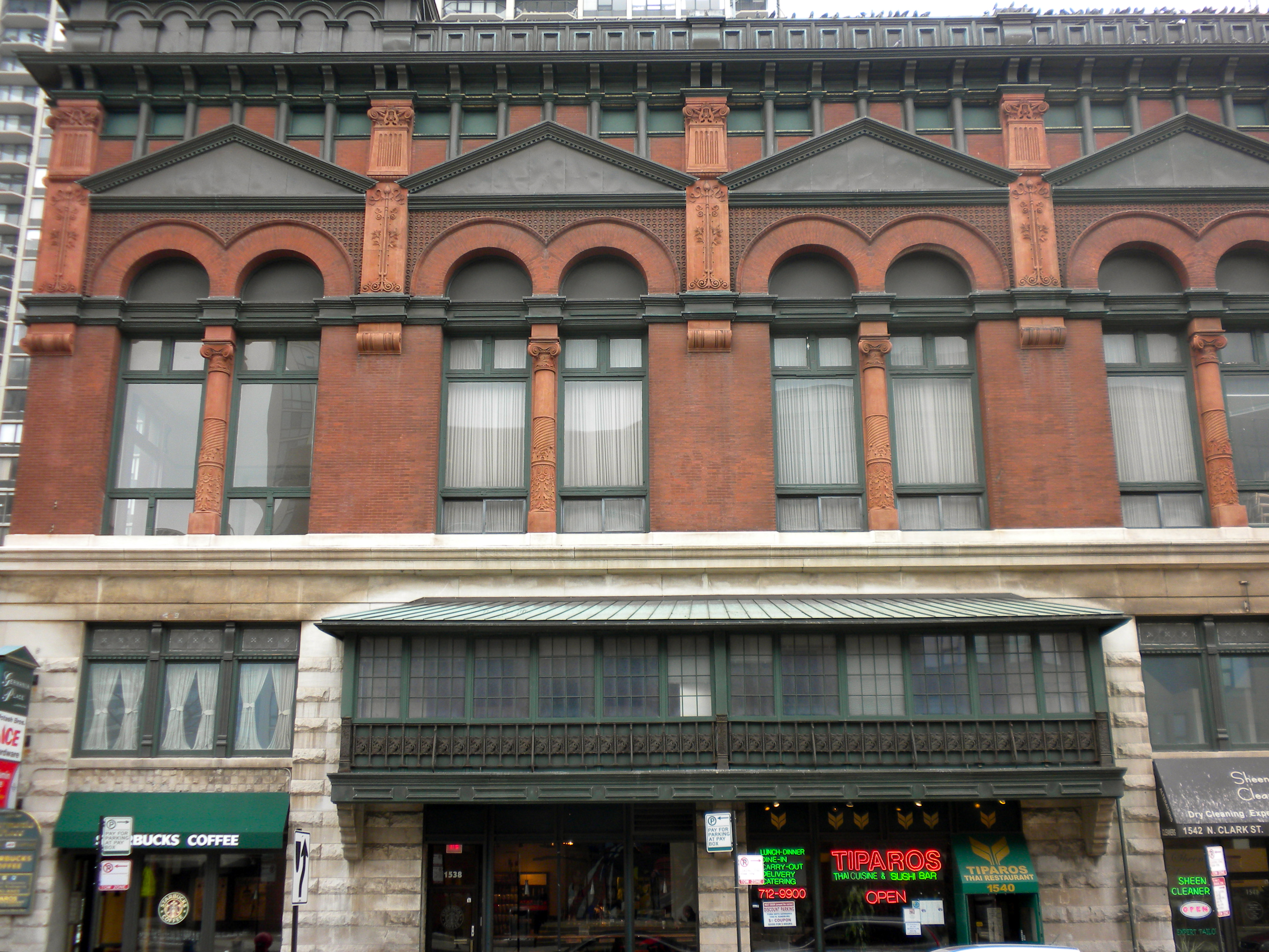
Germania Club Building

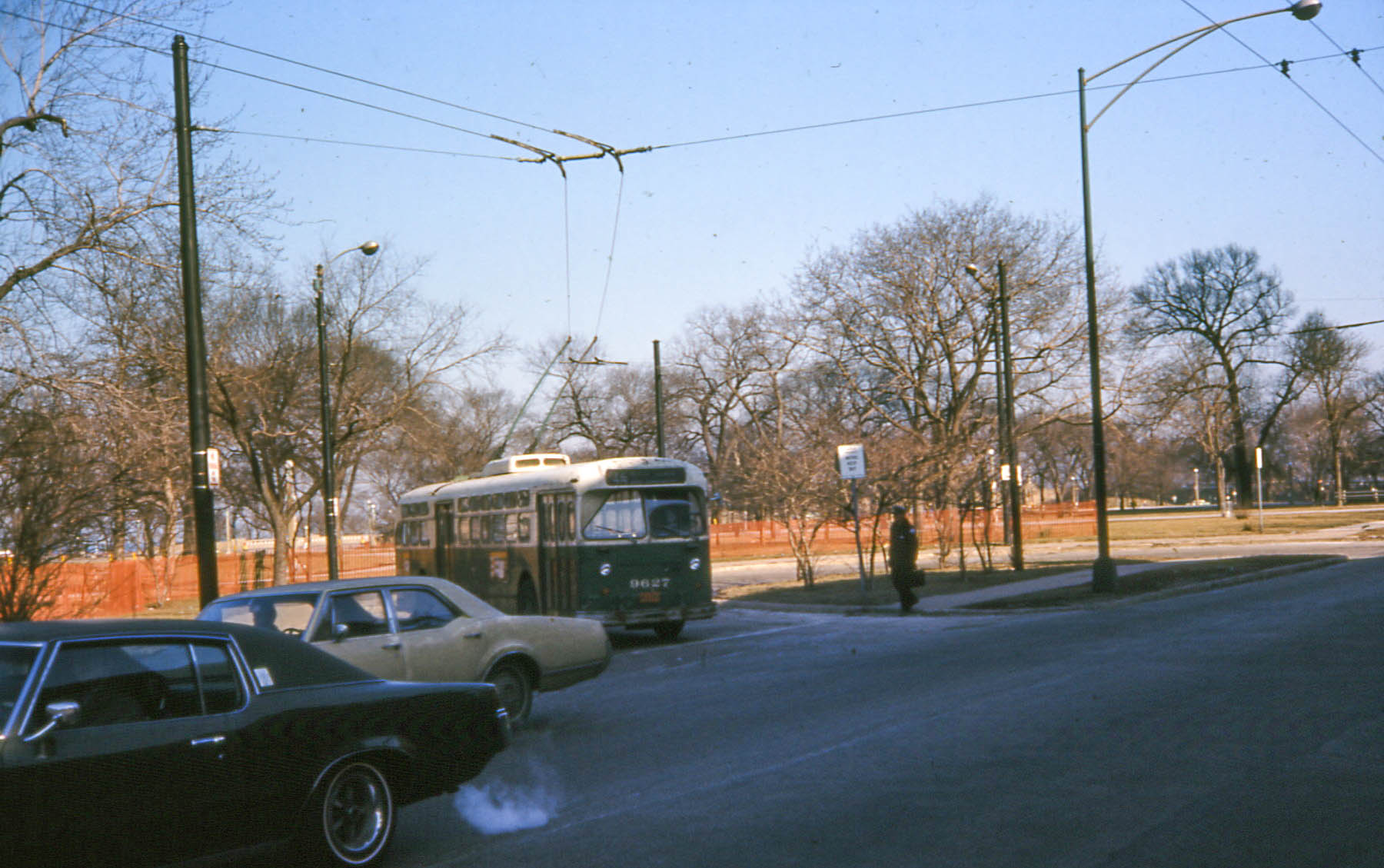
North and Clark in 1969
