= Man's Country (bathhouse) =

Gay bathhouse chain

- 1974 advertisement
- Industry: Gay bathhouse
- Founded: circa 1972
- Founder: Chuck Fleck; Chuck Renslow; Dom Orejudos
- Defunct: January 1, 2018
- Number of locations: 2
- Area served: Chicago, New York City

Man's Country was a chain of bathhouses and private clubs for gay men in Chicago and New York City.

Man's Country/Chicago opened at 5015–5017 North Clark Street in Chicago on September 19, 1973, and held the title of Chicago's longest-running gay bathhouse when it closed in 2017.

Less is known about Man's Country/New York, located at 28 West 15th Street (originally 53-55 Pierrepont Street), which closed in 1983.

== History ==
=== Chicago ===
Man's Country/Chicago
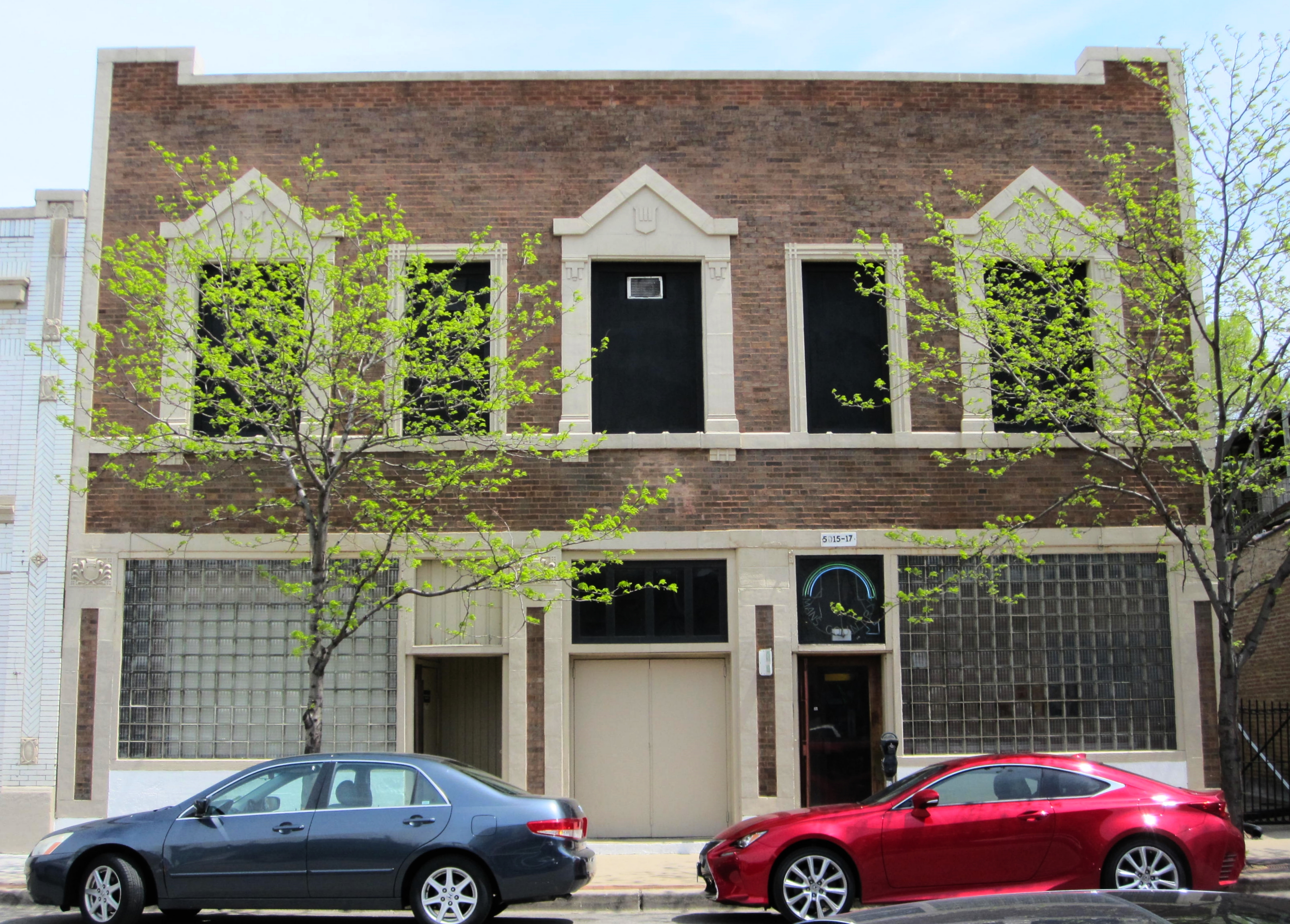
- Man's Country/Chicago exterior (2016)
- Interactive map of the Man's Country/Chicago area

General information
- Location: 5015–5017 North Clark Street Chicago, Illinois, USA
- Coordinates: 41°58′23″N 87°40′04″W
- Opened: September 19, 1973
- Closed: January 1, 2018
- Demolished: 2019
- Owner: Chuck Renslow

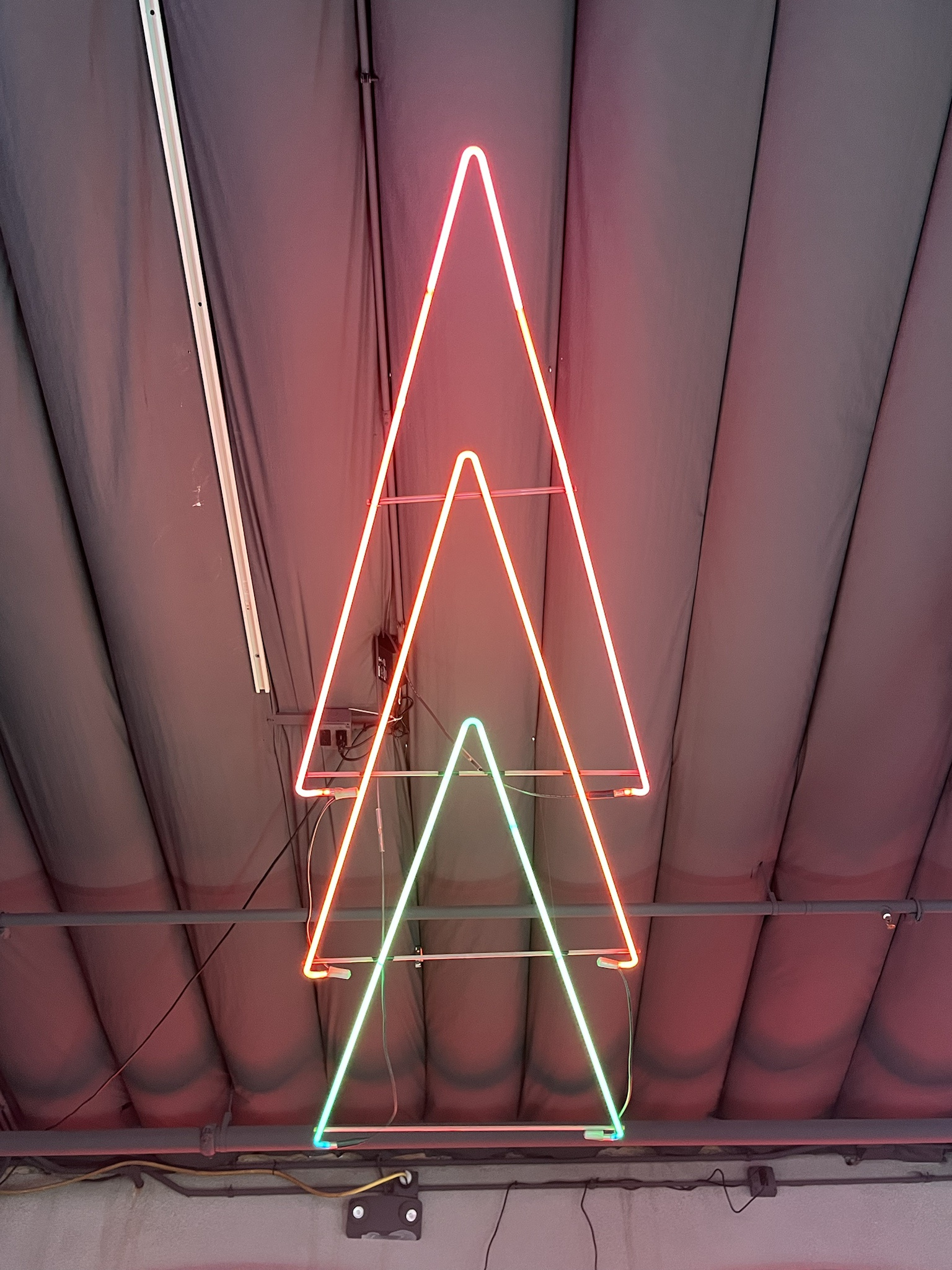
Architectural neon art from a hallway in Man's Country in Chicago (1970s)

Man's Country/Chicago was the third bathhouse co-founded by Chuck Renslow—a pioneering figure in Chicago's gay community—whose previous two clubs were forced to shut down due to homophobia-fueled pressure from the police. Before opening Man's Country/Chicago, Renslow co-founded a Chicago location of the Club Baths chain with Chuck Fleck.

Man's Country was not only a bathhouse but also a concert venue, dance club, community space, gym, and sex club. Renslow and his partner Dom Orejudos purchased the building on Clark Street in 1972 and performed significant renovations to convert it into Man's Country. The three-story complex included a steam room, whirlpool hot tub, and sauna in the basement; a ballroom with a 30-foot ceiling and stage (part of the building's original design as a lodge for a Swedish social club); 26 private rooms; two lounges; a sundeck; a weight room; a juice bar; and various kink play areas for cruising, including glory hole rooms. Its basement wet area was designed to look like the Paris sewers.

The club's popularity peaked in the 1970s and early 1980s. Rudolf Nureyev and Wayland Flowers are among several famous patrons.

Business declined as the HIV/AIDS crisis began to devastate the gay community in the mid-1980s. Renslow implemented numerous safety measures, including closing the orgy room and glory holes; distributing condoms and safe sex literature; and coordinating with the Chicago Department of Public Health.

A dance club was added in 1987, but as the AIDS crisis subsided, patrons increasingly frequented Man's Country for sex rather than dancing or socializing. Famous entertainers who performed at the club include Grace Jones, Boy George, Charles Pierce, the Village People, Viola Wills, Pamela Stanley, Bette Midler, Barry Manilow, The Manhattan Transfer, Sally Rand, Divine Thelma Houston, and Bruce Vilanch.

In the early 2010s the club stopped generating a profit, which the owners attributed to the cost of increasing property taxes, insurance, and deferred maintenance. The club was put up for sale in 2016 but failed to attract a buyer. After Renslow died in June 2017, the decision was made to close at the end of the year. A raucous 13-hour party called "Loose Ends" was held on New Year's Eve 2018 to celebrate the club and mark its closure.

At Renslow's request, much of Man's Country's artwork and memorabilia, including murals by Orejudos (widely known by his pseudonym Etienne), was transferred to the Leather Archives & Museum. The building was demolished in 2019 and replaced with a nine-unit condo building named The Renslow in his honor.

=== New York ===
Man's Country/New York
- Interactive map of the Man's Country/New York area

General information
- Location: 28 West 15th Street, New York, New York, USA
- Coordinates: 40.73730088129025°N 73.99480343150077°W
- Opened: circa 1972
- Relocated: circa 1978
- Closed: 1983
- Owner: Club Chain of Manhattan, Ltd.

Chuck Fleck opened the first Man's Country bathhouse in New York City before co-founding Man's Country/Chicago with Renslow. Man's Country/New York's precise opening date is unclear, but The Gay Blade ran an advertisement for the "brand new" bathhouse in June 1972.

The bathhouse originally occupied three floors at 53-55 Pierrepont Street in Brooklyn. By 1978 it had relocated to 28 West 15th Street in Manhattan, where it occupied ten floors of a narrow building, leading to the marketing slogan "ten floors of fantasy."

Amenities included the truck stop, a "full-sized red tractor-trailer cab [that...] was mostly the site of a continuous orgy;" the jail tank, a mock holding cell; a Jacuzzi; and a restaurant called the Meet Rack. The bathhouse also advertised its Satyr gym club, rental lockers, and "low prices at all times."

Man's Country/New York once hosted a performance by the New York Dolls. The bathhouse famously rented two large billboards above Hess triangle at 7th Avenue and Christopher Street that attracted photographers including Bettye Lane.

In 1978, Michael Rehak, a blind man, was refused entry by staff concerned that his blindness could constitute a safety risk in the event of a fire or other emergency. Rehak filed a complaint with the City Commission on Human Rights. Man's Country/New York settled the case in 1980, agreeing not to discriminate against blind individuals and awarding Rehak a cash payment.

According to Renslow, the New York and Chicago locations were managed separately and he was not involved in operating the New York bathhouse. However, a joint advertisement for both locations published in Little David magazine and Chicago Gay Crusader in 1974 suggests some degree of shared management, at least initially. Fleck later sold his stake in Man's Country/Chicago to Renslow.

Man's Country/New York closed in 1983 during the AIDS crisis.

== Cultural impact and legacy ==
- Man's Country/New York used its platform to advocate on behalf of the LGBTQ community, sometimes plastering its billboards with the messages "GAY RIGHTS" and "REGISTER & VOTE," as seen in this 1978 photograph.
- A closet at Man's Country/New York once served as the headquarters of the Gay & Lesbian Switchboard of New York.
- At Renslow's request, much of Man's Country's artwork and memorabilia, including murals by Orejudos (widely known by his pseudonym Etienne), was transferred to the Leather Archives & Museum. The Leather Archives & Museum was loaned a glory hole from Man's Country/Chicago in June 2019. One of its neon signs is in the collection of the Museum of Neon Art.
- On May 25, 2018, the Chicago City Council voted to designate the eastern stretch of Clark Street between Winnemac Ave and Ainslie Ave—the historic location of Man's Country/Chicago, the Gold Coast, and other businesses owned by Renslow—as "Chuck Renslow Way".

1977 advertisement

== In popular culture ==
- Man's Country/New York frequently advertised on Channel J's The Emerald City, the self-proclaimed "world's first television show for gay men and women." (A recording of one of its commercials is available online.)
- The 2012 film Scrooge & Marley was filmed in part at Man's Country/Chicago.
- In the 2014 film The Normal Heart, Ned and Felix first meet at Man's Country/New York. Matt Bomer and Mark Ruffalo take part in a recreation of a real-life commercial for the bathhouse.

== See also ==
- Museum of Neon Art, which has neon signage from the Chicago location.
