= Club Baths =

Gay bathhouse chain in the US and Canada

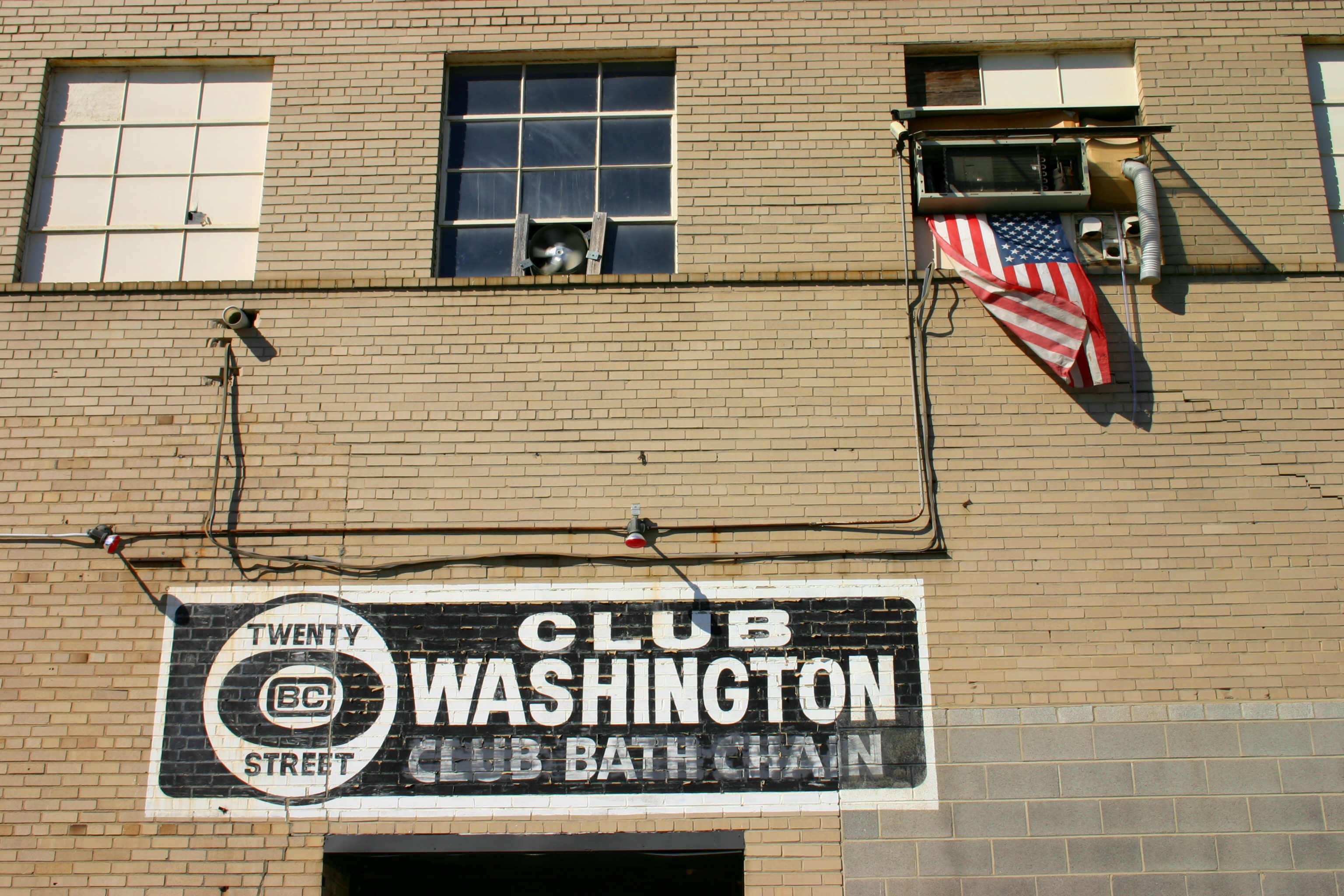
- Club Washington in 2005
- Founded: 1965; 61 years ago
- Founder: John "Jack" W. Campbell
- Number of locations: 42
- Area served: United States; Canada
- Members: 500,000

Club Baths was a chain of gay bathhouses in the United States and Canada with particular prominence from the 1960s through the 1990s.

At its peak it included 42 bathhouses: Akron, Atlanta, Atlantic City, Baltimore, Boston, Buffalo, Camden, Chicago, Cleveland (two locations), Columbus, Dallas, Dayton, Detroit, Hammond, Hartford, Houston, Indianapolis, Jacksonville, Kansas City, Key West, Los Angeles, Miami, Milwaukee, Minneapolis, New Haven, New York, Newark, Philadelphia, Phoenix, Pittsburgh, Providence, St. Louis, San Francisco, Tampa, Toledo, Washington, D.C., London (Ontario), and Toronto.

The chain claimed to have at least 500,000 members. Most of the bathhouses were closed in the 1990s either by government agencies or a changing market after charges were made that it contributed to the spread of AIDS.

The Club was founded in 1965 by John "Jack" W. Campbell (born 1932) and two other investors who paid $15,000 to buy a closed Finnish bath house in Cleveland, Ohio. Campbell wanted to provide cleaner, brighter amenities that were a contrast to the dark, dirty environment that existed previously.

Campbell, a former president of the University of Michigan Young Democrats and a member of the Cleveland Mattachine Society, was active in gay politics and was on the Board of the National Gay Task Force. At one point while encountering Troy Perry, founder of the Metropolitan Community Church, Perry was said to have told him "we have a hundred churches and a total of 30,000 members." Campbell replied, "Well, although we only have thirty churches, we have 300,000 members."

Campbell was also active in the fight against the Save Our Children campaign headed by Anita Bryant in the late 1970s.

The Ottawa Club Baths (3,000 members) was raided in May 1976 by the police. The Toronto Club Baths and three other bathhouses in Toronto were raided on February 5, 1981, in a police action known as Operation Soap.

3,000 men visited the San Francisco Club Baths every week before it closed down. It was located on the corner of 8th and Howard, where it was replaced by a homeless shelter.

Bathhouses that today claim a Club Baths heritage include the CBC Resorts Club Body Center, which has bathhouses in Miami, Florida, Philadelphia, Pennsylvania, and Providence, Rhode Island, and The Clubs, which has facilities in Fort Lauderdale, Houston, Miami, Columbus, Dallas, Indianapolis, and St. Louis. Chuck Renslow and Chuck Fleck—co-owners of Club Baths locations in Chicago, Kansas City, and Phoenix—later opened Man's Country.
