= Sachet (surname) =

Sachet is a surname. Notable people with the surname include:

- Ameer Sachet (born 1963), Swedish politician
- Donna Sachet, American drag queen, singer, community activist, and writer
- Marie-Hélène Sachet (1922–1986), French botanist
