= AIDS Emergency Fund =

Healthcare fund

- Abbreviation: AEF
- Successor: Positive Resource Center
- Formation: 1982
- Founder: Rick Booth; Alan Selby
- Founded at: San Francisco, California, U.S.
- Dissolved: August 17, 2016
- Type: Nonprofit organization
- Legal status: Merged with Positive Resource Center
- Purpose: Emergency financial assistance to people living with HIV/AIDS
- Headquarters: San Francisco, California, U.S.
- Region served: San Francisco and Bay Area counties
- Services: Emergency cash grants for housing, utilities, medical expenses, and basic needs
- Key people: Rick Booth; Alan Selby; Mike Smith; Sandra Nathan; Lee Harrington

AIDS Emergency Fund (AEF), legally incorporated as the San Francisco AIDS Fund, was a nonprofit organization based in San Francisco, California, that provided emergency financial assistance to low-income people living with HIV/AIDS. Founded in 1982 by Rick Booth and Alan Selby, AEF operated independently for 34 years before merging with Positive Resource Center (PRC) in August 2016. Its programs continued under PRC as Emergency Financial Assistance.

AEF distributed small, non-repayable cash grants to clients in acute financial crisis due to AIDS, covering expenses such as rent, utilities, transportation, food, and medical costs. In its first year of operation, the organization raised $6,500. By 1996, it was distributing $1.6 million annually in grants to more than 4,000 clients across multiple Bay Area counties. The organization originated within San Francisco's leather community, which provided much of its early volunteer base and donor support.

For its first two decades, AEF operated as a volunteer-driven organization with minimal paid staff. Its signature fundraising program, Every Penny Counts, partnered with San Francisco businesses, restaurants, and bars to collect change donations in jars placed on counters throughout the city. The organization hired its first paid executive director, Mike Smith, in October 2002. In 2001, AEF founded the Breast Cancer Emergency Fund, which provided similar assistance to people in active treatment for breast cancer.

AEF merged with PRC and Baker Places, Inc. in 2016, forming a combined organization with an aggregate annual budget of approximately $20 million. The GLBT Historical Society in San Francisco holds the AIDS Emergency Fund records, 1985–2019, a 13-linear-foot archive donated in March 2019.

== History ==
=== Background ===
San Francisco was among the first cities in the United States to experience the AIDS epidemic. The first documented case in the city occurred in 1981, and by 1983 the disease had affected hundreds of people in San Francisco. The federal government response under the Reagan administration was limited, and the city's gay and bisexual male population, which bore a disproportionate share of early cases, organized community-based responses to provide care, advocacy, and direct services.

By 1982, several San Francisco AIDS organizations had formed. The Kaposi's Sarcoma Research and Education Foundation, later renamed the San Francisco AIDS Foundation, was established in April 1982. The Kaposi's Sarcoma Research and Education Foundation, later renamed the San Francisco AIDS Foundation, was established in April 1982. AEF was founded to provide direct emergency cash assistance to people with AIDS who had lost employment, housing, or insurance.

=== Founding ===
AEF was founded in 1982 by Rick Booth and Alan Selby. Selby, an English-born leather community figure, was the founder of Mr. S Leather, a San Francisco leather goods retailer that became a center of community organizing during the AIDS crisis. Booth and Selby established the organization to provide emergency cash grants to friends and community members with AIDS who were facing eviction, utility shut-offs, and inability to meet basic expenses. A 2023 academic thesis on eroticism and AIDS activism describes AEF as "founded in 1982 by leathermen," situating the organization's origins within the South of Market leather community.

The organization was incorporated as a California nonprofit under the legal name San Francisco AIDS Fund. Its mission was to provide critical financial assistance to eligible people with AIDS and disabling AIDS-related conditions. In its first year, AEF raised $6,500.

=== Leather community support ===
AEF's institutional ties to San Francisco's leather community continued throughout its history. The San Francisco Planning Department's 2021 landmark designation report for the SF Eagle Bar describes the Eagle's role raising funds for AEF through beer busts and the Bare Chest Calendar, situating AEF within the South of Market leather community from its founding era. Folsom Street has noted that AEF had been established by 1986 and was supported by leather community fundraising. Multiple leather community figures served on AEF's board of directors over the decades.

=== Early leadership and growth ===
AEF operated as a largely volunteer-driven organization for its first two decades. Board members and community volunteers handled grant intake, eligibility decisions, and fundraising. George Burgess served as board president of AEF in the late 1980s. Bay Area Reporter and SF Sentinel coverage from 1988 identified him as a former president of AEF, and a February 1989 Bay Area Reporter item referenced a proclamation of "George Burgess Day in San Francisco" in connection with his AEF service.

By 1992, the organization was distributing more than $1 million annually in emergency grants. By 1996, Bay Area Reporter coverage reported that AEF distributed $1.6 million in grants to more than 4,000 clients across ten Bay Area counties. The organization's signature fundraising program, Every Penny Counts, placed change-collection jars in San Francisco businesses, restaurants, bars, schools, and offices. Volunteers delivered empty jars and collected them when full. In 1994, AEF launched the Bare Chest Calendar, an annual fundraising publication featuring men selected from San Francisco's leather and bear communities.

In 1997, AEF faced a financial crisis. The October 30, 1997 Bay Area Reporter reported that the organization's board had voted to decrease the maximum annual grant from $500 to $400 per client, with the lifetime cap also reduced. Ambassador James Hormel was an active financial supporter of HIV/AIDS service organizations in San Francisco during this period. Grant amounts were restored to $500 per year in March 1998.

=== Professionalization and program expansion ===
In spring 2001, AEF founded the Breast Cancer Emergency Fund to provide similar financial assistance to low-income people in active treatment for breast cancer. The Breast Cancer Emergency Fund was modeled on AEF's program logic and shared office space, staff, and administrative systems with AEF.

In October 2002, AEF hired its first paid executive director, Mike Smith. Smith had co-founded the NAMES Project AIDS Memorial Quilt in 1987 and served as its managing director from 1987 to 1989. He had previously served as executive director of the LGBT Community Center of Colorado. Under Smith, AEF and the Breast Cancer Emergency Fund together served approximately 2,900 low-income clients per year by the early 2010s. Smith also served as chair of the HIV/AIDS Provider Network, representing San Francisco HIV service organizations in negotiations with the Mayor's Office and Department of Public Health. He retired in June 2015.

Lee Harrington joined AEF in 1997 as Director of Client Services and held the role for 24 years, through the PRC merger and the rebranding to Emergency Financial Assistance. He retired in December 2021.

=== Merger with Positive Resource Center ===
Sandra Nathan was hired as AEF's executive director in August 2015, succeeding Smith. A 2016 San Francisco Chronicle report noted that Nathan had been hired to help the agency plot a path for survival given declining federal HIV funding and a challenging fundraising environment.

On August 17, 2016, Positive Resource Center announced its merger with AEF and Baker Places, Inc. The Bay Area Reporter reported that the three organizations' aggregate annual budget was $20 million under PRC executive director Brett Andrews. AEF's grant program continued under the AIDS Emergency Fund name as a program of PRC and was later rebranded as Emergency Financial Assistance. The San Francisco Department of Public Health later commissioned Facente Consulting to assess and re-envision the Emergency Financial Assistance program.

The Breast Cancer Emergency Fund did not merge with PRC. After joint operation with AEF, it transferred to Bay Area Cancer Connections, where it operates as the Breast and Ovarian Cancer Emergency Fund.

== Programs and grantmaking ==
AEF's core program was the distribution of one-time emergency cash grants to low-income people living with HIV/AIDS. The organization did not provide loans, ongoing support, or case management; grants were intended to address acute financial crises that could not be resolved through other safety-net resources.

=== Eligibility ===
To qualify for a grant, applicants had to be San Francisco residents diagnosed with HIV or AIDS, with household income at or below 300 percent of the federal poverty level, although in earlier decades AEF extended grants to clients in surrounding Bay Area counties. Applications were submitted through partner social service agencies and HIV case managers, who verified eligibility and submitted documentation on the client's behalf. This referral-based model continued under Emergency Financial Assistance after the PRC merger.

=== Grant amounts and uses ===
The standard grant amount fluctuated over the organization's history based on available funding. Grants were $500 per year through much of the 1990s, reduced to $400 in 1997 during the organization's financial crisis, and restored to $500 in March 1998. Under PRC, Emergency Financial Assistance grants reached $500 per cycle, with separate eviction-prevention grants introduced in later years.

Grants covered rent, utilities, transportation, food, and medical expenses not covered by insurance. The organization did not fund items such as legal fees, debt repayment, or expenses not related to housing stability or basic needs.

=== Breast Cancer Emergency Fund ===
The Breast Cancer Emergency Fund was founded by AEF in spring 2001 to extend the emergency grant model to people in active treatment for breast cancer. It shared office space, staff, and administrative systems with AEF. Eligibility paralleled AEF's, with breast cancer diagnosis and active treatment substituted for HIV/AIDS status. The Breast Cancer Emergency Fund later transferred to Bay Area Cancer Connections and continues to operate as the Breast and Ovarian Cancer Emergency Fund.

== Funding ==
AEF was funded through individual donations, special events, corporate sponsorships, foundation grants, and government contracts. The mix shifted over the organization's history, with individual giving and community fundraising dominating the early decades and government contracts becoming a larger share by the 2010s.

=== Community fundraising ===
Every Penny Counts was AEF's signature fundraising program. The campaign placed change-collection jars at hundreds of San Francisco businesses, restaurants, bars, schools, and offices. Volunteers delivered empty jars and collected them when full, with proceeds counted at public events on or near World AIDS Day. At its peak in the mid-1990s, Every Penny Counts contributed approximately $40,000 annually to AEF's budget.

The Bare Chest Calendar, launched in 1994, was an annual fundraising publication featuring men selected from San Francisco's leather and bear communities. Calendar participants served as fundraisers throughout the year, appearing at community events to solicit donations. The calendar continued as a PRC fundraiser after the 2016 merger.

The SF Eagle Bar in South of Market hosted regular fundraising events benefiting AEF, including beer busts that raised funds over multiple decades. The bar's role as an AEF fundraising venue was documented in the San Francisco Planning Department's 2021 landmark designation for the property.

AEF also hosted an annual awards dinner recognizing major donors, longtime volunteers, and community partners. AEF was also a beneficiary of AIDS Walk San Francisco during the 1990s and 2000s.

=== Institutional funding ===
Following the hiring of Mike Smith as executive director in 2002, AEF expanded its institutional fundraising, securing foundation grants and government contracts to supplement community fundraising. By the early 2010s, federal Ryan White HIV/AIDS Program funding and San Francisco Department of Public Health contracts represented a substantial portion of the organization's revenue. Declines in federal HIV funding through the 2010s contributed to the organizational pressures that preceded the 2016 merger.

== Leadership ==
=== Founders ===
Rick Booth was an interior decorator in San Francisco who co-founded AEF in 1982 and remained associated with the organization for decades. The Bay Area Reporter described him in 1999 as having co-founded AEF, and he was honored at AEF's 25th anniversary in 2007.

Alan Selby was the English-born founder of Mr. S Leather, a San Francisco leather goods retailer. In addition to co-founding AEF, Selby was active in the broader leather community's response to the AIDS crisis.

=== Board presidents and chairs ===
George Burgess served as board president of AEF in the late 1980s. Independent coverage in the Bay Area Reporter and SF Sentinel documents his tenure as a former president and the proclamation of "George Burgess Day in San Francisco" in connection with his AEF service.

Scott Williams served as board chair of AEF and was identified in Bay Area Reporter coverage of the 2016 PRC merger.

=== Executive directors ===
For its first two decades, AEF operated without a paid executive director. Board members and volunteers shared executive functions, with a small staff handling daily operations during the 1990s.

Mike Smith served as executive director from October 2002 to June 2015. Before joining AEF, Smith co-founded the NAMES Project AIDS Memorial Quilt and served as its managing director. During his tenure at AEF, Smith chaired the HIV/AIDS Provider Network and represented San Francisco HIV service organizations in negotiations with city officials.

Sandra Nathan served as executive director from August 2015 through the 2016 merger. A 2016 San Francisco Chronicle report indicated Nathan was hired to help the agency develop a sustainability strategy amid declining federal HIV funding.

=== Senior staff and volunteers ===
Lee Harrington served as Director of Client Services from 1997 through December 2021, a tenure of 24 years that spanned the PRC merger and the rebranding of AEF's programs as Emergency Financial Assistance. Harrington was responsible for direct client services, grant intake, and eligibility decisions throughout the organization's later history.

Joanie Juster served on AEF's board of directors and was a longtime volunteer with the organization. Bay Area Reporter coverage has described her involvement with AEF and her continued volunteerism after the merger.

== Legacy ==
AEF's emergency grant program continued under PRC as Emergency Financial Assistance. The program serves San Franciscans living with HIV/AIDS and, following program expansion, additional client populations facing housing and financial crises. Through the PRC era, Emergency Financial Assistance distributed grants and eviction-prevention assistance under a revised theory of change developed in consultation with Facente Consulting and the San Francisco Department of Public Health.

In March 2019, the GLBT Historical Society in San Francisco received the AIDS Emergency Fund records, 1985–2019, a 13-linear-foot archive donated by the organization. The collection includes board minutes, grant records, fundraising materials, organizational correspondence, and the Heart to Heart newsletter. The Smithsonian Institution holds AEF's 20th Anniversary Awards Gala program and related materials.

The Breast Cancer Emergency Fund, founded by AEF in 2001, continues to operate as the Breast and Ovarian Cancer Emergency Fund under Bay Area Cancer Connections.

== See also ==
- San Francisco AIDS Foundation
- NAMES Project AIDS Memorial Quilt
- Project Open Hand
- Shanti Project
- Folsom Street Fair
- Alan Selby
