= Samuel Steward =

American poet, novelist, tattoo artist (1909–1993)

- Steward in 1957
- Born: Samuel Morris Steward; July 23, 1909; Woodsfield, Ohio
- Died: December 31, 1993 (aged 84); Berkeley, California
- Occupations: Novelist, tattoo artist

Samuel Morris Steward (July 23, 1909 – December 31, 1993), also known as Phil Andros or Phil Sparrow, was an American tattoo artist and pornographer.

Throughout his life, he kept extensive secret diaries, journals, and statistics of his sex life. He lived most of his adult life in Chicago, where he tattooed sailor-trainees from the U.S. Navy's Great Lakes Naval Training Station (as well as gang members and street people) out of a tattoo parlor on South State Street. He later moved to the San Francisco Bay Area, where he spent the late 1960s as the official tattoo artist of the Hells Angels Motorcycle Club.

== Life and career ==
Steward was born in Woodsfield, Ohio, and began attending Ohio State University in Columbus in 1927.

=== Teaching and writing ===
He taught English at OSU from 1932 until 1934 as a university fellow. His first year-long post was as an instructor of English in 1934 at Carroll College in Helena, Montana. In 1936, he was summarily dismissed from his second teaching position, at the State College of Washington (now Washington State University) at Pullman, as a result of his sympathetic portrayal of a prostitute in his well-reviewed comic novel Angels on the Bough. He subsequently moved to Chicago, where he taught at Loyola University until 1946. After leaving Loyola to help re-write the World Book Encyclopedia, he subsequently taught at DePaul University.

Born into a Methodist household, Steward converted to Catholicism during his university years, but had long since abandoned the Catholic Church by the time he accepted his teaching position at Loyola. From the mid-1930s until 1949, he was deeply addicted to alcohol, but he managed to overcome this dependence with the help of Alcoholics Anonymous.

Steward was introduced to Gertrude Stein in 1932 by his academic advisor, Clarence Andrews, and the two began a long correspondence that led to a warm friendship. He visited her rented country home in France during the summers of 1937 and 1939. During the 1937 trip, he also met with many other literary figures, including Thornton Wilder, Lord Alfred Douglas (the lover of Oscar Wilde), Thomas Mann, and André Gide. He detailed these encounters, some of them sexual, in his brief memoir, Chapters from an Autobiography. He also described his friendship with Stein and Alice B. Toklas in his Dear Sammy: Letters from Gertrude Stein and Alice B. Toklas.

=== Collaborations with Kinsey and others ===
Steward met sex researcher Alfred Kinsey in late 1949 and subsequently became an unofficial collaborator with Kinsey's Institute for Sex Research. During his years of work with the institute, Steward collected and donated sexually themed materials to the Kinsey archive, gave Kinsey access to his lifelong sexual records, introduced him to large numbers of sexually active men in the Chicago area, and provided him with large numbers of early Polaroid sex photographs which he took during the frequent all-male sex parties he held in his Chicago apartment. He also allowed Kinsey to take detailed photographs of that sexually themed apartment. He ultimately donated large numbers of drawings, paintings, and decorative objects that he himself had created to the institute.

In the spring of 1950, at Kinsey's invitation, he was filmed engaging in BDSM sex with Mike Miksche, a New York-based erotic artist also known as Steve Masters. After Gertrude Stein, Kinsey was Steward's most important mentor; he later described Kinsey as "as approachable as a park bench" and as a god-like bringer of enlightenment to humankind, thus giving him the nickname, "Doctor Prometheus."

While making the transition from professor to tattoo artist during the 1950s, Steward befriended several gay artists and writers, including Paul Cadmus, George Platt Lynes, Julien Green, Fritz Peters, and Glenway Wescott. At Kinsey's specific request, he also kept highly detailed journals and diaries of his daily sexual activities, and chronicled them in a secret card catalogue he referred to as his "Stud File." Starting in 1957, he began contributing short stories based on his many sexual encounters to the Zürich-based homophile magazine Der Kreis ("The Circle"), to which he also contributed essays, reviews, and homophile journalism.

During his final years in Chicago, Steward befriended Chuck Renslow, co-owner of Kris Studio, and Renslow's partner Dom Orejudos, the homoerotic illustrator also known as "Stephen" and "Etienne." Renslow and Orejudos would later open the Gold Coast, Chicago's first leather bar, and found International Mr. Leather, a yearly gathering of leathermen from around the world.

=== Pornography work ===
In the 1960s, Steward began writing and publishing his erotica under the name Phil Andros, initially with the Danish magazine Eos/Amigo. Some of his early works described his fascination with rough trade and sadomasochistic sex; others focused on the power dynamics of interracial sexual encounters between men. In 1966, thanks to changes in American publishing laws, he was able to publish his story collection $TUD with Guild Press in the United States, under the pseudonym Phil Andros. By the late 1960s, Steward began writing a series of pulp-pornographic novels featuring the hustler Phil Andros as narrator.

=== Tattooing ===
Steward "initially developed an interest in tattoos because of his attraction to the kinds of masculinity he saw in criminals, hustlers, bikers, sailors, and other working-class men". As a leading tattoo artist of the 1950s and '60s, Steward was mentored by Milwaukee-based master tattooist Amund Dietzel. Steward, in turn, mentored Cliff Ingram, aka Cliff Raven, and Don "Ed" Hardy, later known simply as Ed Hardy, encouraging both to practice the Japanese-style tattooing he himself most admired. Chuck Arnett was one of Steward's tattoo clients. After retiring from tattooing in 1970, Steward wrote a social history of American tattooing during the 1950s and '60s, which was ultimately published as Bad Boys and Tough Tattoos.

== Death ==
In his later years, Steward's abilities as a writer were compromised by chronic obstructive pulmonary disease and a barbiturate addiction. He died at the age of 84 in Berkeley, California.

== Reception and scholarship ==
In 1972, Jack Fritscher became the first openly gay writer to unearth and interview Steward; his Steward audiotapes were referenced in Justin Spring's biography of Steward. The Leather Archives & Museum in Chicago holds recordings of several interviews Steward sat for in the 1980s and 1990s, as well as some of Steward's writings, art, and stencils.

Starting in 2001, Justin Spring tracked down Steward's archive and began writing the biography Secret Historian: The Life and Times of Samuel Steward, Professor, Tattoo Artist, and Sexual Renegade, which was ultimately published by Farrar, Straus and Giroux in 2010. The book was a finalist for the National Book Award. It received the National Leather Association's Geoff Mains Non-fiction book award for 2011.

In 2018, Jeremy Mulderig edited The Lost Autobiography of Samuel Steward: Recollections of an Extraordinary Twentieth-Century Gay Life, published by the University of Chicago Press.

In 2012, 2014, and 2018, Seth Eisen of Eye Zen Presents created the play Homo File depicting the life and times of Steward, as part of a project to unearth and spread gay history from when homosexuality "could not speak its name".

== Honors ==
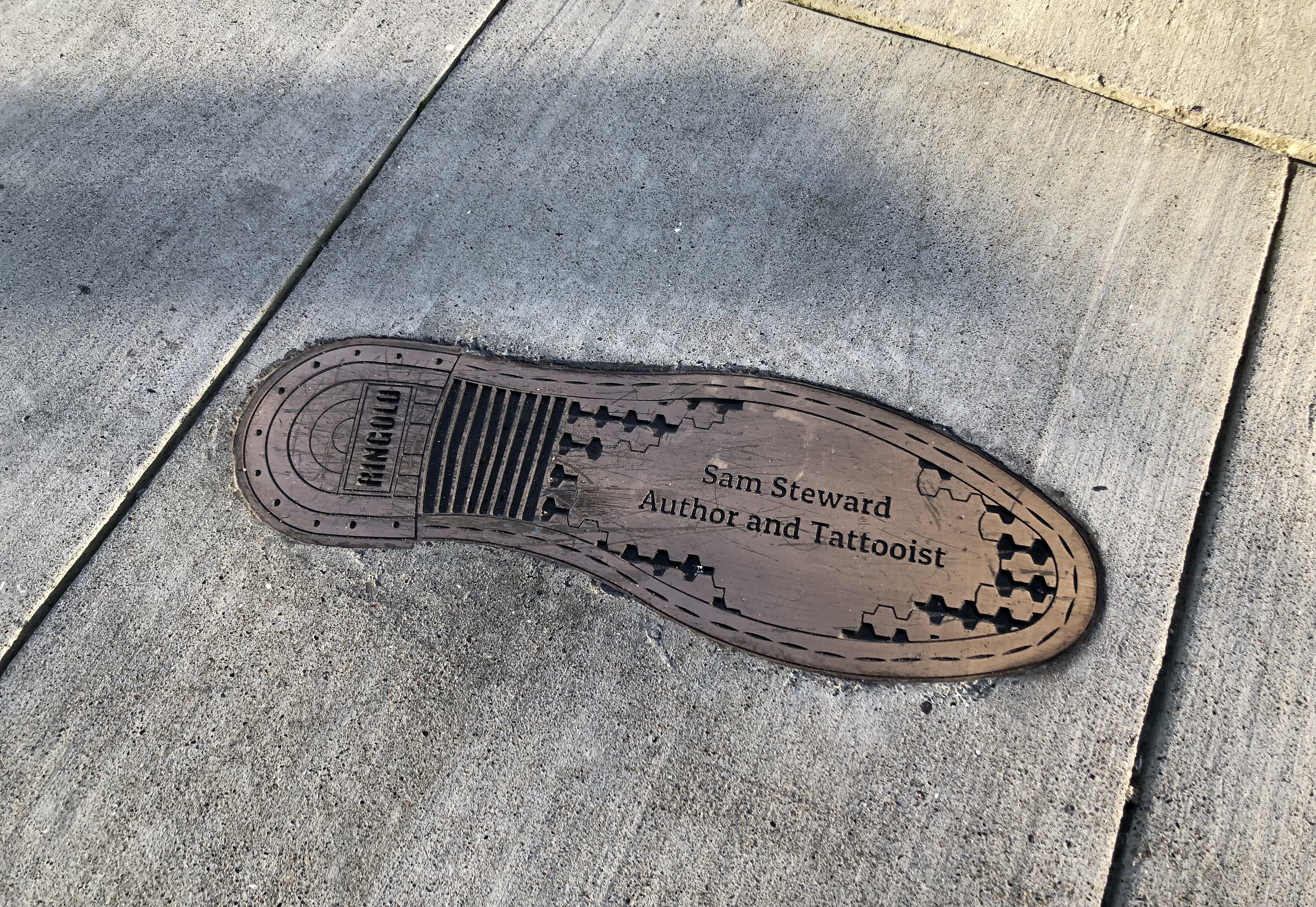
Bootprint in honor of Steward, inlaid into the sidewalk as part of the San Francisco South of Market Leather History Alley

In 2012, Steward was inducted into the Leather Hall of Fame.

Steward was honored in 2017 along with other notables, named on bronze bootprints, as part of San Francisco South of Market Leather History Alley.

== Bibliography ==
As Philip Sparrow:

- Philip Sparrow Tells All: Lost Essays by Samuel Steward, Writer, Professor, Tattoo Artist, edited by Jeremy Mulderig (2015)

As Phil Andros:

- The Motorcyclist (1953)
- $tud (1966)
- The Joy Spot (1969)
- My Brother, the Hustler (1970; later published as My Brother, My Self)
- San Francisco Hustler (1970; later published as The Boys in Blue)
- When in Rome, Do . . . (1971; later published as Roman Conquests)
- Renegade Hustler (1972; later published as Shuttlecock)
- Below the Belt and Other Stories (1975)
- The Greek Way (1975; later published as Greek Ways)
- Different Strokes: Stories (1984)

As Samuel M. Steward:

- Pan and the fire-bird (1930; short stories)
- Angels on the Bough (1936)
- Dear Sammy: Letters from Gertrude Stein and Alice B. Toklas (1977, ed.)
- Parisian Lives (1984; novel)
- Chapters from an autobiography (1981; memoir)
- Love Poems: Homage to Housman (1984; ManRoot; First Edition)
- Murder Is Murder Is Murder (1985; Gertrude Stein-Alice B. Toklas Mystery)
- The Caravaggio Shawl (1989; Gertrude Stein-Alice B. Toklas Mystery)
- Bad Boys and Tough Tattoos: a Social History of the Tattoo with Gangs, Sailors, and Street-Corner Punks, 1950-1965 (1990)
- Understanding the Male Hustler (1991)
- Pair of Roses (1993)
