= Folsom Street Fair =

Kink and leather fair in San Francisco

Coordinates: 37.77289°N 122.41276°W

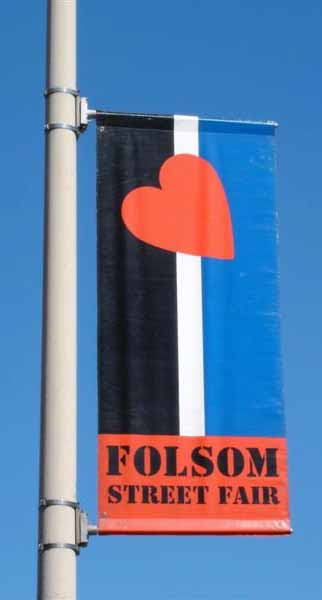
- Frequency: Annually, last Sunday of September
- Locations: Folsom Street, San Francisco, United States
- Inaugurated: 1984
- Most recent: September 27, 2026
- Attendance: 250–400,000 (estimate)
- Website: www.folsomstreet.org

Folsom Street Fair (FSF) is an annual kink, leather subculture, and alternative sexuality street fair, held in September that concludes San Francisco's "Leather Pride Week". The Folsom Street Fair, sometimes referred to simply as "Folsom", takes place on the last Sunday in September, on Folsom Street between 8th and 13th Streets, in San Francisco's South of Market district.

The event started in 1984, and is California's third-largest single-day, outdoor spectator event and the world's largest leather event and showcase for BDSM products and culture. It has grown as a non-profit charity, and local and national non-profits benefit with all donations at the gates going to charity groups as well as numerous fundraising schemes within the festival including games, beverage booths and even spanking for donations to capitalize on the adult-themed exhibitionism.

== Origin of the leather subculture ==
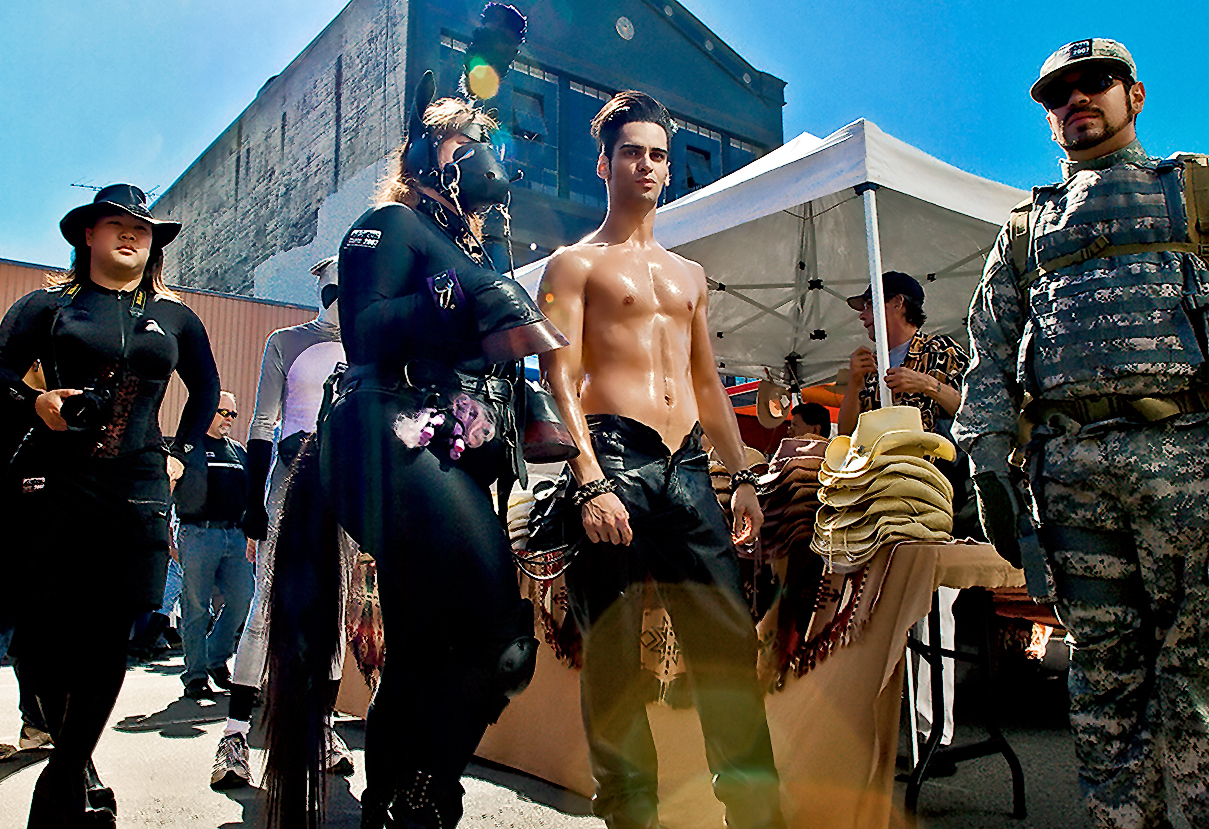
A mixture of kink and leather subcultures mix at the festival. The man on the right may be into uniform and military attire, while the other fair-goers seem to be interested in animal roleplay, including a bare-chested "rider" with his "pony".

Although sadomasochism has been practiced for many centuries, the USA gay leather scene gained impetus in 1945 when thousands of gay servicemen were given blue discharges from service after World War II and came to the major port cities of the United States to live in gay ghettos. In 1953, the Marlon Brando film The Wild One appeared, and some butch gays began to imitate Brando by wearing black leather jackets, a black leather cap, black leather boots and jeans and, if they could afford it, by also riding motorcycles. In the 1950s, the magazine Bizarre familiarized people with sexual fetishism.

== History of the leather community in San Francisco ==
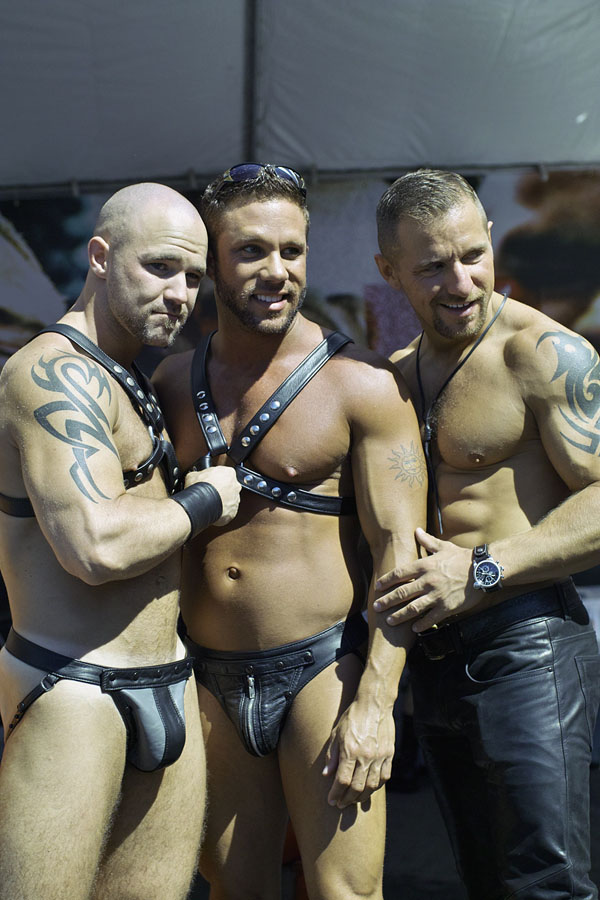
Men wearing leather clothing at the Fair, 2007

The first proto-leather bar in San Francisco was the Sailor Boy Tavern, which opened in 1938 near the Embarcadero YMCA and catered to U.S. Navy Sailors looking for same-sex sexual encounters.

Folsom Street has been the center of San Francisco's men's leather community since the mid-1960s. Before centering in the South of Market neighborhood, leather friendly bars were located in the Embarcadero (Jack's On The Waterfront at 111 Embarcadero 1952–1963, On The Levee ?–1972), and the Tenderloin (The Spur Club at 126 Turk – raided and closed in 1959, The Why Not at 518 Ellis – opened and closed in 1960, The Hideaway at 438 Eddy – raided and closed in 1961). The first leather bar in SOMA was the Tool Box, a gay leather bar which opened in 1961 at 339 4th St and closed in 1971. It was made famous by the June 1964 Paul Welch Life article entitled "Homosexuality In America", the first time a national publication reported on gay issues. Life's photographer was referred to the Tool Box by Hal Call, who had long worked to dispel the myth that all homosexual men were effeminate. The article opened with a two-page spread of the mural of life size leathermen in the bar, painted by Chuck Arnett, a patron and employee. The article described San Francisco as "The Gay Capital of America" and inspired many gay leathermen to move there.

The first leather bar on Folsom Street was Febe's, on the southwest corner of 11th and Folsom, which opened July 25, 1966. The Stud bar, which opened in 1966 at 1535 Folsom St., was a gay leather bar that was also originally a Hells Angels hangout; by 1969 it had become a dance bar for hippies on the margins of the leather scene and had a psychedelic black light mural by Chuck Arnett (in 1987, it moved to 399 9th St. at Harrison). In 1967 A Taste of Leather, one of the first in-bar leather stores, was established at Febe's by Nick O'Demus. As of late 2009, A Taste of Leather announced it would be going out of business after 43 years.

In 1971, the modern bandana code came into use among leather people. Many leather people went to the Embarcadero YMCA (at this YMCA, doing weight training while wearing nothing but gym shoes and a jockstrap as well as nude swimming were both allowed until 1975, when women could become members of the YMCA). Leather people who worked out at the Embarcadero YMCA took advantage of the opportunity to get together with sailors when they came into town and rented rooms at the adjacent Embarcadero YMCA Hotel.

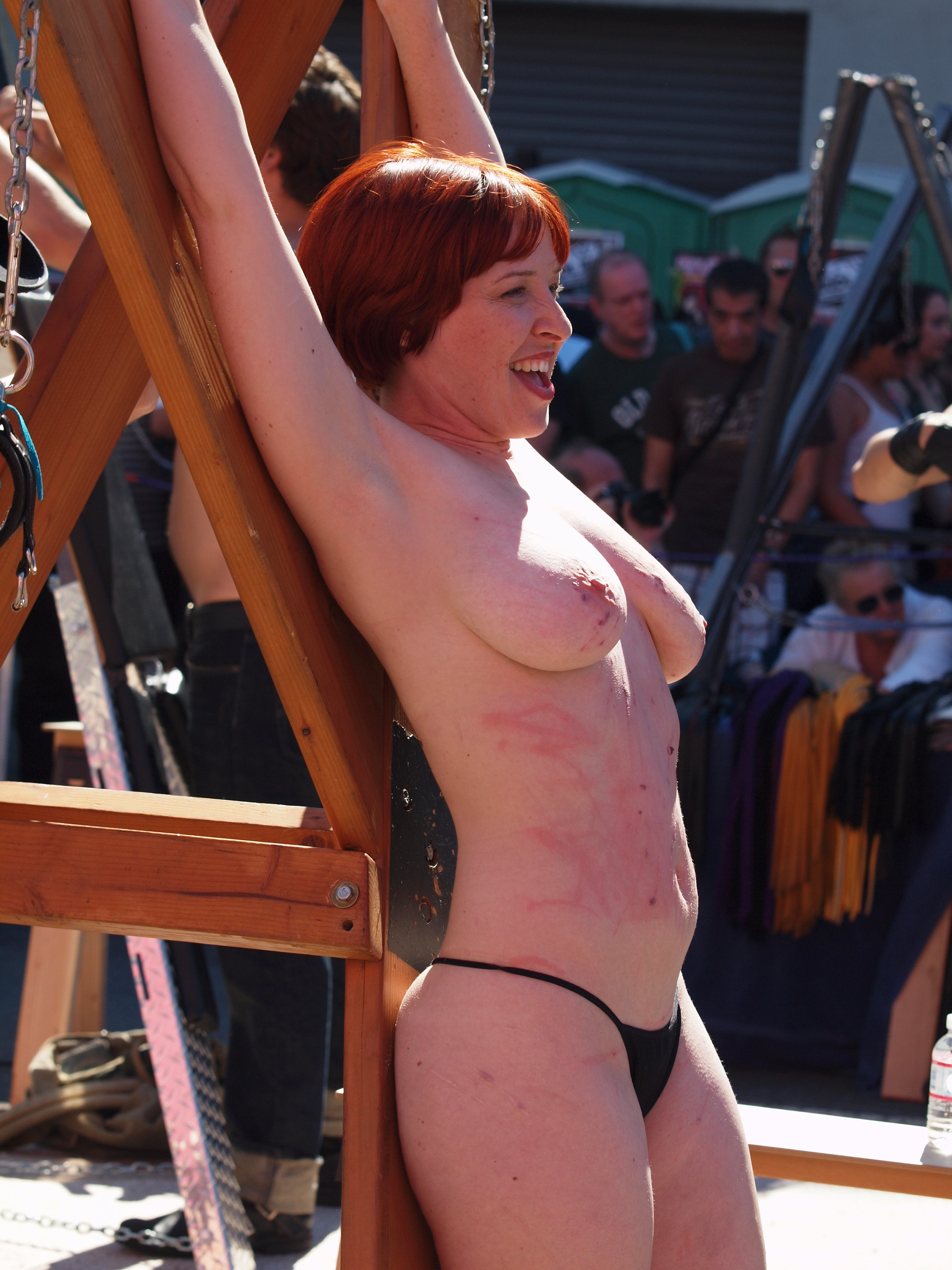
Photo shows a submissive woman bound to Saint Andrew's Cross whipped at Folsom Street Fair 2010. The red marks on her body are from the whipping.

By the late 1970s Folsom's Miracle Mile had featured nearly 30 different leather bars, sex clubs, and merchants, most within walking distance of each other. These establishments included, in the order they were established:

- 1968 – Off the Levee (by the same owner of On The Levee), The Ramrod.
- 1971 – The In Between (later renamed The No Name), The Bootcamp.
- 1972 – The Barracks at 72 Hallam St., off Folsom between 7th and 8th Streets (a gay bathhouse for people into hardcore BDSM—each room was arranged like a stage set to cater to a different fetish fantasy).
- 1973 – The Red Star Saloon (connected to the Barracks) (which featured new artwork by Chuck Arnett), the End Up (not a leather bar but a dance bar; however, many leather people who liked to dance went there), Folsom Prison, The Ambush, Big Town—a gay leather shopping mall on the south side of Folsom between 6th and 7th Streets.
- 1975 – Hombre, The Catacombs (for those into hard core fisting), The Emporium.
- 1976 – The Trading Post, The Slot (for those into hardcore flagellation), The hotel (later renamed The Handball Express — a place for those into hardcore fisting).
- 1977 – The Brig, The Balcony.
- 1978 – The Arena, The Roundup (later renamed The Watering Hole—a place for those into urolagnia), The Quarters, Black & Blue, Folsom Street Baths at 1015 Folsom (a BDSM gay bathhouse, later renamed The Sutro Baths in 1980—the slogan of the Sutro Baths was "A rainbow of sexual preferences", which was inscribed on a banner above the orgy room, located where the main dance floor of 1015 Folsom now is. The Sutro Baths also admitted women and trans people).
- 1979 - The Stables at 1123 Folsom (for those who liked to dress as cowboys), The Trench (for those into hardcore urolagnia), The Hothouse on the northwest corner of 5th and Harrison (another BDSM gay bathhouse), Tailor of San Francisco, Mister S Leath.
- 1980 – The Plunge — a gay BDSM bathhouse with swimming pool on the northwest corner of 11th and Folsom (in 1983 the swimming pool was covered over and became the surface of the dance floor of the popular bisexual dance club The Oasis).
- 1981 – The Eagle at 398 12th St., as of 2010, is San Francisco's oldest leather bar, as well as its largest with its extensive outdoor patio, and it has hosted many popular barbecues and beer busts to benefit charitable organizations.

The predecessor of the Folsom Street Fair was the CMC Carnival (California Motorcycle Club Carnival), a gay leather BDSM dance (with DJs and a rock band) and fair, with vendors and a back room for casual sex. It was held on the second Sunday of November every year from 1966 to the last one in 1986 at various indoor venues including most often at the Seafarer's International Union Hall (referred to as Seaman's Hall for short) at 350 Fremont Street in the Embarcadero area of SOMA. In the early 1970s, the CMC Carnival was attended by a few hundred people and by the time of the last large CMC Carnival in 1982 at what was then the Yellow Cab Building at Jones and Turk in the Tenderloin, it was attended by over 4,000 people.

The "CMC Carnival" was organized by one of the leather motorcycle clubs, the California Motorcycle Club, with the help of other gay motorcycle clubs. The members of these gay motorcycle clubs rode mostly Harley-Davidson motorcycles and on periodic weekends rode their motorcycles to outings at picnic grounds in the Sierra Nevada. The first gay motorcycle club in the United States was the Satyrs, founded in Los Angeles in 1954. The first gay motorcycle club in San Francisco was the Warlocks, which was founded in 1960, followed by the California Motorcycle Club, also founded in 1960 later in the year. By the mid-1960s, San Francisco's South of Market district had become the center of the gay motorcycle club scene and was home to motorcycle clubs such as the Barbary Coasters (founded in 1966) and the Constantines and the Cheaters (both founded in 1967). Some leather people of the 1960s and 1970s felt that one was not really a leather person but just a poseur unless one owned an actual motorcycle, preferably a Harley-Davidson.

Gay motorcycle clubs in San Francisco also organized many benefits for charity at various leather bars. During the 1970s and early 1980s one could see many dozens of motorcycles belonging to people who were members of these clubs parked up and down the length of Folsom Street on the Miracle Mile. The membership of these motorcycle clubs was decimated by the AIDS crisis beginning in 1982.

In 1979 the newly formed San Francisco lesbian motorcycle club, Dykes on Bikes, led what was then called the San Francisco Gay Freedom Day Parade for the first time and has done so ever since (since 1994, the event has been called the San Francisco Pride Parade). By the mid-1980s, lesbian motorcycle enthusiasts in other cities began to form motorcycle clubs. In the 1980s and early 1990s, lesbian leatherwomen were often involved in helping to care for gay leathermen who had been stricken with AIDS.

In 1984 the Folsom Street Fair began in San Francisco; it is the world's largest leather event and showcase for BDSM products and culture.

In 2008 and 2012, Folsom Street Events received the Large Nonprofit Organization of the Year award as part of the Pantheon of Leather Awards, although in 2012 it tied with Cleveland Leather Annual Weekend. In 2013, the San Francisco Leathermen's Discussion Group received the Small Nonprofit Organization of the Year award as part of the Pantheon of Leather Awards. Then in 2015 Folsom Street Events received the Nonprofit Organization of the Year award as part of the Pantheon of Leather Awards.

The San Francisco South of Market Leather History Alley consists of four works of art along Ringold Alley honoring leather culture; it opened in 2017. The four works of art are: A black granite stone etched with a narrative by Gayle Rubin, an image of the "Leather David" statue by Mike Caffee, and a reproduction of Chuck Arnett's 1962 mural from the Tool Box, a gay leather bar, engraved standing stones that honor community leather institutions including the Folsom Street Fair, leather pride flag pavement markings through which the stones emerge, and metal bootprints along the curb which honor 28 people who were an important part of the leather communities of San Francisco.

== Beginnings of the Folsom Street Fair ==
The community had been active in resisting the city's ambitious redevelopment program for the South of Market area throughout the 1970s. City officials had wanted to "revitalize" the historically blue-collar, warehouse, industrial district by continuing successful high-rise development already underway on Rincon Hill.

But as the AIDS epidemic unfolded in the 1980s, the community's relative autonomy from City Hall was dramatically weakened. The crisis became an opportunity for the city (in the name of public health) to close bathhouses and regulate bars, which they did beginning in 1984.

As these establishments for the leather community were rapidly closing, a coalition of housing activists and community organizers decided to start a street fair. The fair would enhance the visibility of the community, provide a means for much-needed fundraising, and create opportunities for members of the leather community to connect to services and vital information (e.g., regarding safer sex) that bathhouses and bars might otherwise have been situated to distribute.

Thanks to the success of the first Folsom Street Fair, the organizers created the Up Your Alley Fair on Ringold Street in 1985. This fair moved to Dore Street ("Dore Alley") between Howard and Folsom in 1987.

Street photographer Michael Rababy says that a century of artists and poets are being replaced by algorithmics and trust-fund hipsters, but as the millennium tower sinks, the Folsom Street Fair stands its ground.

Due to the COVID-19 pandemic, there was no fair in 2020.

== Atmosphere ==
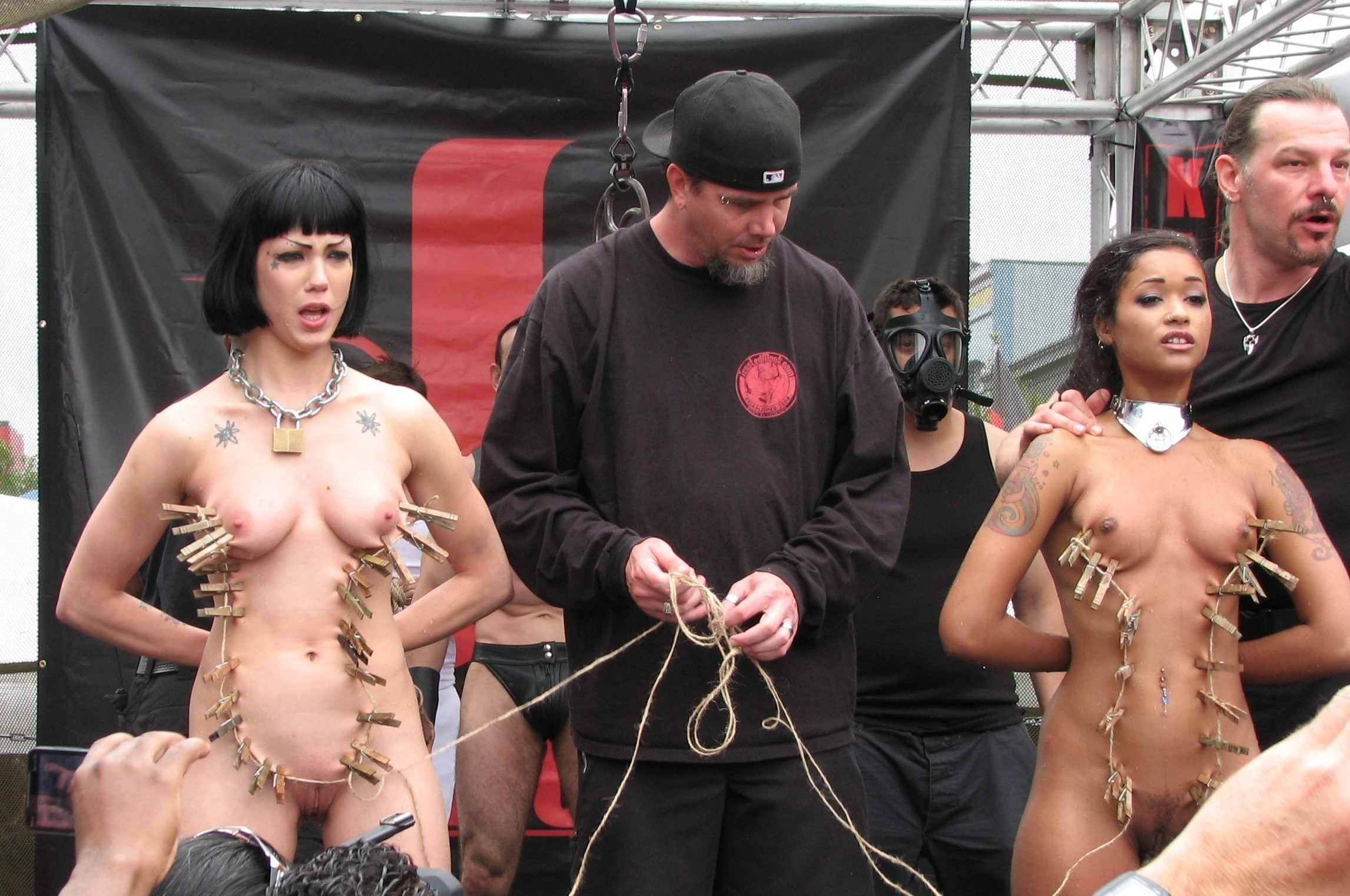
Maledom in public at Folsom Street Fair, USA

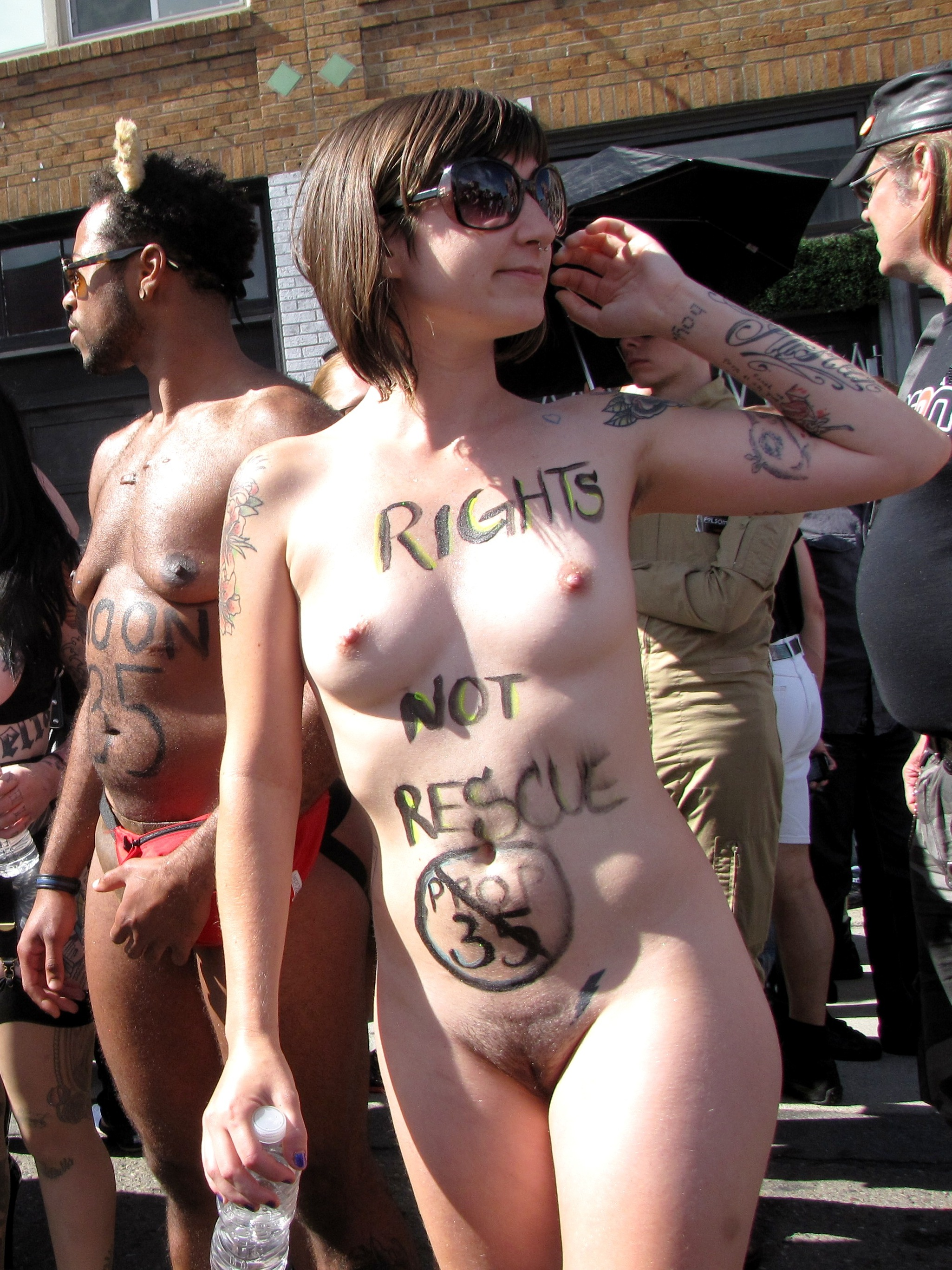
A woman uses her body to demonstrate for sex workers' rights.

As one of the few occasions when sadomasochistic activities are encouraged and performed in public, it attracts a considerable number of sightseers and those who enjoy the attention of onlookers as well as hundreds of photographers and videographers. Although the costumes and activities are frequently transgressive, many attendees find the event "eye-opening" and positive, and its food court area serving as a contrasting, more relaxed social environment. On the other hand, the event has at times drawn public and internal criticism for its bawdy atmosphere and broad tolerance of lewd behavior, and it is a regular target for anti-gay organizations such as Americans for Truth about Homosexuality.

The fair claims it draws 250,000 visitors annually, including leather fetishists from around the world, and is the third-largest street event in California, after the Tournament of Roses Parade and San Francisco Pride parade. Each year, net proceeds from Folsom Street Fair, including gate donations and beverage sales, are given to qualified local charities ("beneficiaries"). These include charities working in public health, human services, and the arts, as well as beverage partners, and the Sisters of Perpetual Indulgence who lead the organizing effort at the gates. The event regularly generates over $300,000 annually for charity. Money raising events also include a charity spanking booth, live BDSM demonstrations and a twister stage.

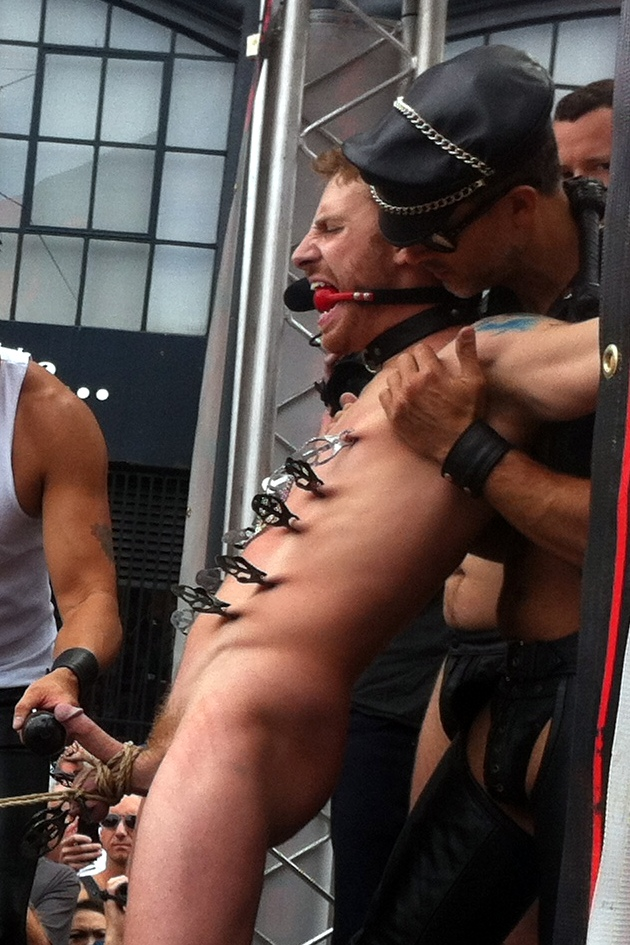
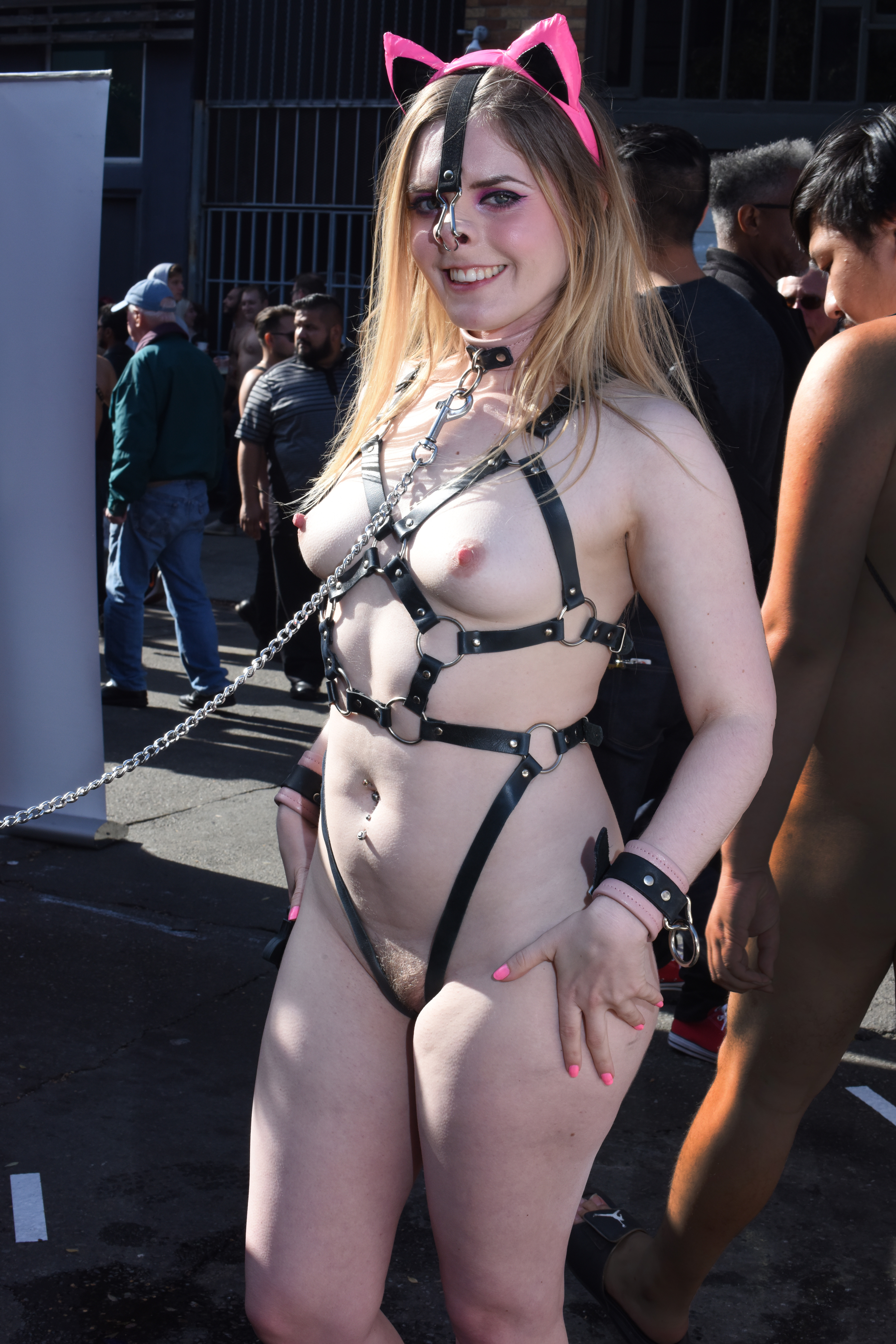
Left: Demonstration of cock and ball torture at Folsom Street Fair. Right: A submissive woman led on a leash at Folsom Street Fair.

Fair organizers present one or two live stages for alternative bands and artists. Previous headlining live acts have included Austra, Little Boots, Miami Horror, Ladytron (DJ Team), Dragonette, Imperial Teen, Berlin, the Presets, Monarchy, the English Beat, Missing Persons, MNDR, Light Asylum, Shiny Toy Guns, Natalie Portman's Shaved Head, Nitzer Ebb, MEN (featuring JD Samson of Le Tigre), My Life With The Thrill Kill Kult, the Limousines, Ladyhawke, Adult., and Yacht. Over time, the fair is becoming more and more well known as a venue for top-notch, international underground musical talent. There are one or two dance areas with DJs and cage dancers, featuring DJ sets from the likes of Tony Moran, Manny Lehman, The Cucarachas featuring Tom Stephan, and Mark Moore of S'Express.

In 2006, Folsom Street Fair introduced a women's area, dubbed "Bettie Page's Secret" for the first year, then "Venus' Playground" and as of 2016 the current area is called the Playground. The Playground is open to "women of every kind and all trans and non-binary folks." The Playground also hosts the Queer Commons, a space for all genders of queer folks. In 2007, an erotic artists' area was established as well with a performance art stage appearing in 2013 in honor of the 30th fair.

=== Folsom Street East ===
Since 1997, a smaller event called Folsom Street East has been organized in New York City by GMSMA. There is no affiliation between Folsom Street East (NYC) and Folsom Street Events (SF).

=== Folsom Europe ===
Folsom Europe was established in Berlin, Germany, in 2003 in order to bring the non-profit leather festival concept pioneered by the Folsom Street Fair in San Francisco to Europe.

=== Folsom Fair North (FFN) ===
The Toronto version of Folsom Street Fair was dubbed Folsom Fair North, FFN or FFNTO, and was held annually in July from 2003 until it was canceled permanently in 2008.

== 2007 poster controversy ==
The official poster for the 2007 Folsom Street Fair

For the 24th annual event held on September 30, 2007, the official poster artwork was a photo featuring well-known LGBT and BDSM community members in festive and fetish attire including Sister Roma "as players in an innovative version of the culturally iconographic" The Last Supper by Leonardo da Vinci, complete with a table draped with the Leather Pride flag and "cluttered with sex toys, whips, and various (BDSM) restraints". The image by FredAlert was used on the official event guide and produced as collector's posters that were displayed throughout the city as advertising for the event. Some conservative religious groups criticized the image as anti-Christian and blasphemous, although media outlets noted that parodies and homages of the "Last Supper" painting like Renée Cox's Yo Mama's Last Supper are numerous, including ones by The Simpsons, The Sopranos, Phish, That '70s Show, Robert Altman (in the film MASH) and the Boston Red Sox. Chris Glaser, a gay clergyman and interim senior pastor at San Francisco's Metropolitan Community Church opined that "they are just having fun" with both the painting and the notion of 'San Francisco values,' and called the poster "tastefully and cleverly done".

In a press release, Andy Copper, board president of Folsom Street Events asserted that there was "no intention to be particularly pro-religion or anti-religion with this poster; the image is intended only to be reminiscent of the "Last Supper" painting. It is a distinctive representation of diversity with women and men, people of all colors and sexual orientations" and added "we are going to produce a series of inspired poster images over the next few years. Next year's poster ad may take inspiration from American Gothic by Grant Wood or Edvard Munch's The Scream or even The Sound of Music!" He also called those offended by the poster "extreme members of the global community".

The Catholic League, Concerned Women for America and the Family Research Council targeted the largest mainstream sponsor of the event, Miller Brewing Company, threatening to boycott their products for the company's support of the event and allowing its logo to appear in the ad. Miller asked for its logo to be removed from the poster: "we take exception to the poster the organizing committee developed this year. We understand that some individuals may find the imagery offensive." Subsequently, the Catholic League ended the boycott. Nancy Pelosi, congresswoman for San Francisco and then Speaker of the U.S. House of Representatives, opined at a press conference: "I do not believe Christianity has been harmed by the Folsom Street Fair."

== Books ==
In 2017, Fair Page Media published The Mayor of Folsom Street. The biography of Alan Selby includes insights into the early days of the Folsom Street Fair.

In 2018, Delancey Street Press published the Folsom Street Food Court, with images captured by Michael Rababy. The book is a documentary photography monograph that captures San Francisco's Folsom Street Fair. The unguarded images feature people in various states of dress and undress in the rarely photographed street fair food court. The book documents two years shot a decade apart, 2007 and 2017, to demonstrate that although the city of San Francisco has gentrified over time, the Folsom Street Fair seems to maintain its authenticity.
