= The Beginning of the Fields =

The Beginning of the Fields by Fairfield Porter

The Beginning of the Fields is a 1973 oil on canvas painting by the American artist Fairfield Porter, held at the collection in the Memorial Art Gallery of the University of Rochester.

== Formal analysis ==
The Beginning of the Fields trusts the negative space within. Nearly half of the oil canvas painting consists of the sky, with barely anything else there. It appears to be a light orange wash with no clouds or sunlight. The sky reads like a wash of light instead of dynamic weather and the horizon is low according to the composition, which makes the whole painting still. Since the horizon is slightly under the center, the sky takes up more of the canvas. The gaze then goes to the ground where the rest of the painting is a surface with light.

The road makes the painting move. It goes through to the foreground in a long and grey diagonal, going from the bottom left corner to the right edge and out of sight. The road does not shrink in width towards a vanishing point, meaning that it does not pull the viewer to a vanishing point. There is a light patch in the middle of the painting that appears to be pavement or a puddle, either of which breaks up the grey in order to read the road as not completely flat. The soft edges go on to meet the grass, and the road leads the eye towards a row of dark trees, at which point the eyes can move freely. The road facilitates this by acting as a way to move across the painting. Overlap and scale, in place of perspective, is utilized to create depth and make the viewer travel through the composition. This keeps the eye moving from left to right instead of fixating on one spot for too long.

The trees are the darkest objects in the painting, doing the most in terms of structure inside the piece. The tree left of the center has a thin trunk and angularly shaped leaves. The second tree is cut off due to the edge with its branches sticking out. The right tree appears to be heavier with the left tree being taller; in the middle is a row of short trees. The row itself sits on the horizon and unites with the two bigger trees at the middle of the painting. The low dark shrubs become smaller in size as they are closer to the horizon, contributing further to depth. At the left edge, a small white car is the lightest part of the painting, which makes it easily glanced over.

The color stays calm throughout; the grass, the strip of the field, as well as the sky are very close in value, which gives the painting unity instead of separation. The dark green of the trees then stands out because everything around it is light in nature. The colors are used to divide planes in place of demonstrating texture. The grass is a brighter green in the front and the road is a warm grey, which keeps the planes separate without color shading in between. The effect is an environment that reads as clear without one singular color dominating the others.

The surface goes to support all above points. The paint appears to be matte and thinly applied, with very few visible lines. This makes the whole composition read as a formation of geometric shapes instead of details being put together side by side. Since the paint texture is almost invisible, the focus is on placement of objects instead of technique. The canvas is big enough for the sky and the fields to dominate most of the viewer’s attention, with the dark green trees unlikely to take over. The oil painting is held by the relationship between its different planes and its management of being clear and flat.

== Artist's background ==
Fairfield Porter was born in 1907 in Winnetka, Illinois. Justin Spring, an American art historian, talks of him as someone who is known for close paintings of his family and home. He studied art history at Harvard University, followed by learning figure drawing in New York, specifically the Art Students' League, an independent and non-profit art school. In addition to being an artist, Fairfield Porter was a critic for publications like The Nation and Artnews.

According to Justin Spring, Fairfield Porter had a profound relationship with James Schuyler, an American poet, who lived with his family for years due to struggles with manic depression. The two creatives shared an intimate relationship despite Porter's marital status with poet Anne Channing Porter. Schuyler's poetry included color theory and collage techniques, often capturing ordinary moments in his prose.

Miles Edward Friend sees Fairfield Porter as an artist who has worked to decrease the difference between Abstract Expressionism and Impressionism, often working with expressive but less traditional forms of composition. He also utilized his admiration for French Intimism as a tool in his works, often choosing places that felt the most intimate to him in his paintings.

== Composition ==
On page 308 of Fairfield Porter: The Painter as Critic, Downes states that Porter wanted to avoid anything that would limit what he thought was unique in scenes he painted. This could go on to justify the role of the trees in the discussed painting as trees are traditionally used as framing markers in many landscape works, but in this case are utilized as part of the greater spatial composition.

Additionally, Downes hones in on the fact that Fairfield Porter never returned to the same place in order to finish a landscape because the light would not stay consistent. This can contribute to the role of the materials in the painting; Fairfield Porter consistently used oil paint after the 1960s, only capturing the light in one sitting instead of the assumption that he was capturing the weather.

== Reception ==
Modern approaches to art are mixed with a traditional landscape feeling when talking about Fairfield Porter's pieces. Color, composition, and other physical qualities of paint were connected by Fairfield Porter in his works according to Hilton Kramer's 1983 essay. Porter made similar environments through his artistic choices feel interesting to the viewer, mainly through not fitting in with major art movements at the time. His work gained recognition after his death, as seen at the Museum of Fine Arts in Boston in 1983, where Hilton Kramer explained that Fairfield Porter has not gained similar levels of attention from the community despite being respected among others.

Small details like the car and street signs may point to human activity without depicting any real humans on the canvas. This creates a rather uneasy feeling for the composition due to the absence of living organisms, where Porter gives viewers a sense of questioning the place's attributes or historical background. The car itself is not easily seen in the painting itself due to its lack of general contrast with the rest of the painting, white against other muted colors.

== Archives ==
The Fairfield Porter papers are an archival collection documenting the life and career of American painter, art critic, and poet Fairfield Porter (1907-1975). Held by the Archives of American Art at the Smithsonian Institution, the collection spans 1888 to 2001, with the bulk of them dating 1924 to 1975, and measuring 9.3 linear feet. It includes correspondence, business records, printed materials, photographs, sketchbooks, artworks, and writings. The papers were donated by Porter's wife, the poet Anne Porter, in five accessions between 1977 and 1997, with the collection being digitized in 2007.

Utilizing these archives have allowed art historians like Justin Spring to discuss Fairfield Porter's works further from a critic's view. In Fairfield Porter's autobiography, Spring presents the artist as a man who struggles with his own identity yet creates a successful life for himself, all despite lack of public recognition until his passing.
