= San Francisco South of Market Leather History Alley =

Monument in San Francisco, United States of America

Ringold Street in San Francisco, California

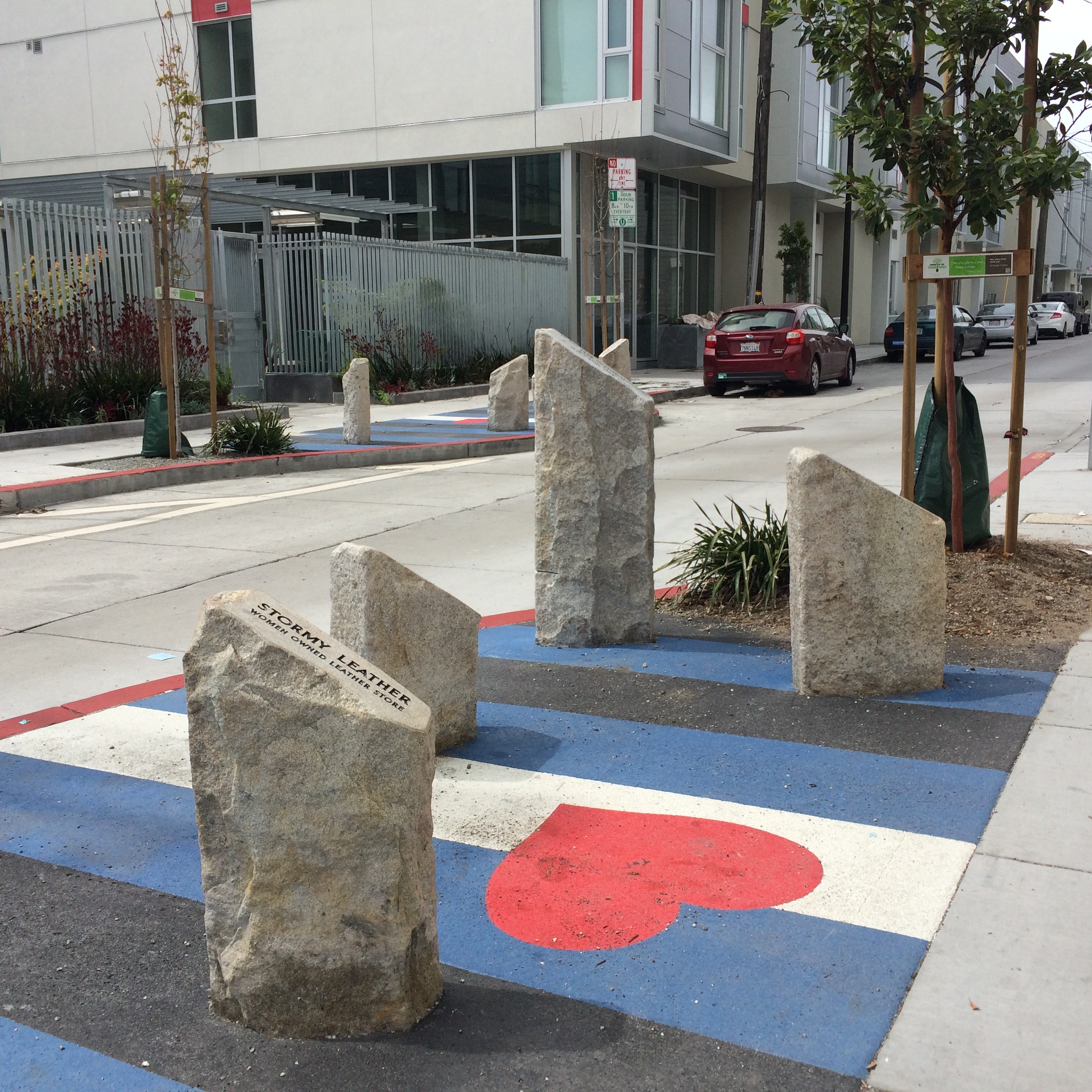
Part of the art installation, including a stone marker for Stormy Leather (women-owned leather store)

The San Francisco South of Market Leather History Alley consists of four works of art that honor the history of gay and lesbian leather culture in South of Market, San Francisco. The art is embedded in Ringold Street, an alley between 8th and 9th Street. The installation opened in 2017. The alley is part of the Leather and LGBTQ Cultural District.

== Artworks ==
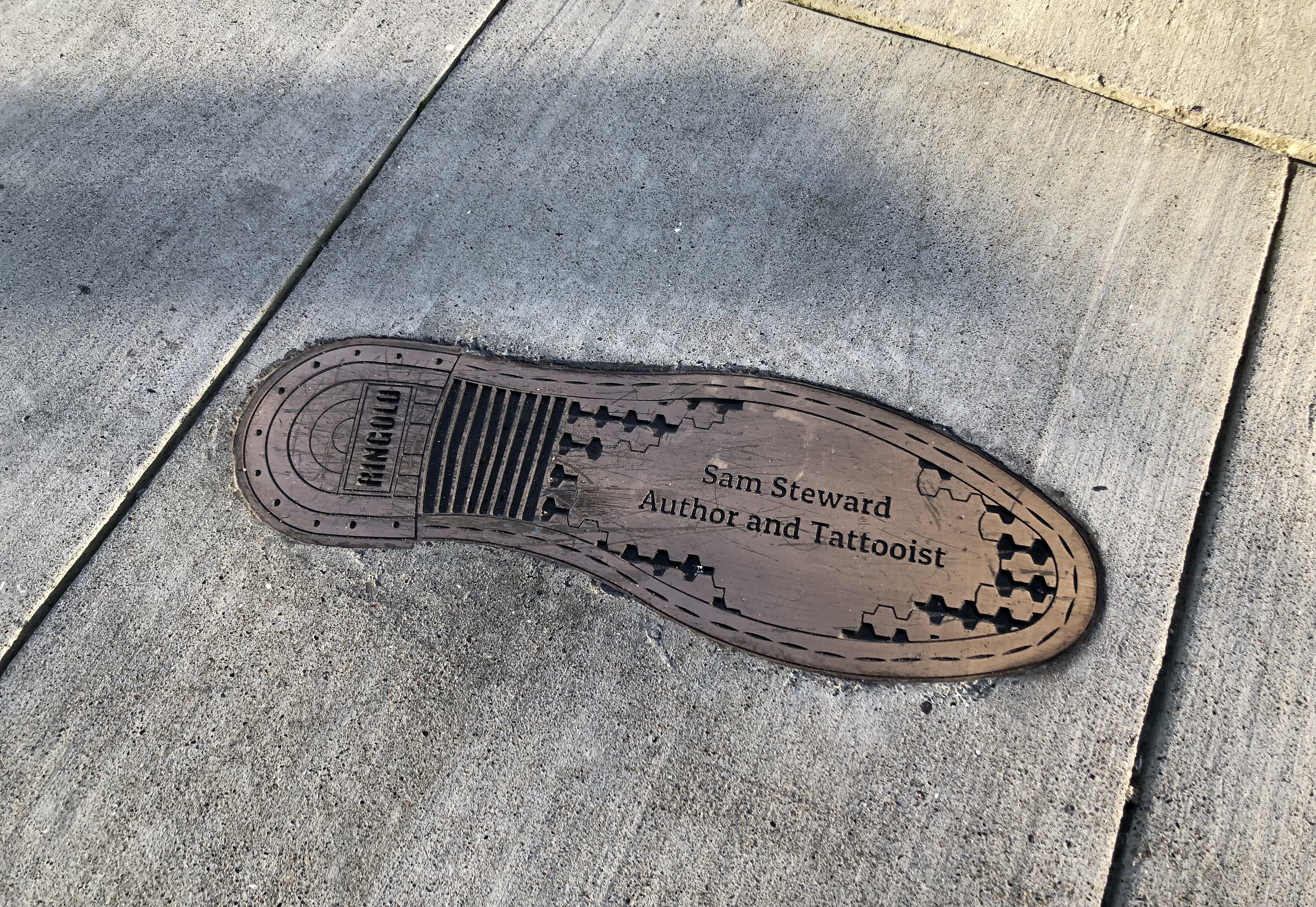
Bronze bootprint inlaid in the sidewalk as part of the San Francisco South of Market Leather History Alley, honoring Sam Steward.

Collectively titled Leather Memoir, the artworks, mainly created by landscape architect Jeffrey Miller, are:

- A black granite stone etched with a narrative by Gayle Rubin, an image of the "Leather David" statue by Mike Caffee, and a reproduction of Chuck Arnett's 1962 mural that was in the Tool Box (a gay leather bar),
- Engraved standing stones that honor community leather institutions including the Folsom Street Fair,
- Leather pride flag pavement markings through which the stones emerge, and
- Bronze bootprints along the curb honoring 28 individuals who were an important part of local leather communities:
  - Jim Kane (community leader and biker)
  - Ron Johnson
  - Steve McEachern (owner of the Catacombs, a gay and lesbian S/M fisting club that was the most famous fisting club in the world)
  - Cynthia Slater (a founder of the Society of Janus)
  - Tony Tavarossi (manager of the Why Not)
  - Chuck Arnett
  - Jack Haines (Fe-Be's and The Slot owner)
  - Alexis Muir (an owner of South of Market bars and baths, including The Stud)
  - Sam Steward
  - Terry Thompson (SF Eagle manager)
  - Philip M. Turner (founder of Daddy's Bar)
  - Hank Diethelm (The Brig owner)
  - Kerry Brown, Ken Ferguson, and David Delay (Ambush co-owners)
  - Alan Selby (founder of the store Mr. S Leather and known as the "Mayor of Folsom Street")
  - Peter Hartman (owner of 544 Natoma art gallery and theater)
  - Robert Opel
  - Tony DeBlase (creator of the leather pride flag)
  - Marcus Hernandez (Bay Area Reporter leather columnist)
  - John Embry (founder and publisher of Drummer magazine)
  - Geoff Mains (author of Urban Aboriginals)
  - Mark Thompson (author and cofounder of Black Leather Wings)
  - Thom Gunn
  - Paul Mariah (poet, printer and activist)
  - Robert Davolt (author and organizer of the San Francisco Pride leather contingent, and editor of Bound & Gagged)
  - Jim Meko (printer and South of Market activist)
  - Alexis Sorel (co-founder of The 15 and member of Black Leather Wings)
  - Bert Herrman (author and publisher; leader of handball community)
  - T. Michael "Lurch" Sutton (biker and co-founder of the Bears of SF)

== External list ==
- Ringold Alley Miller Company Landscape Architects
- Black Leather Wings
