= Leather pride flag =

Symbol used by leather and fetish subcultures

- Use: Represents leather subculture
- Adopted: 1989; 37 years ago
- Design: Nine equally sized horizontal stripes (from top to bottom: four of alternating black and royal blue, one white, and four of alternating royal blue and black) with a tilted red heart in the canton
- Designed by: Tony DeBlase

The leather pride flag is a symbol of leather subculture as well as kink and fetish subcultures more broadly, including BDSM. The flag was designed by Tony DeBlase in 1989.

== History ==
The leather pride flag was designed by Tony DeBlase in Chicago, Illinois. DeBlase explained his decision to create the flag:

For the 20th anniversary of Stonewall, I felt that the time was right for the Leather men and women who have been participating in these same parades and events more and more visibly in recent years to have a similar simple, elegant banner that would serve as a symbol of their own identity and interests.

DeBlase described the flag design as follows:

The flag is composed of nine horizontal stripes of equal width. From the top and from the bottom, the stripes alternate black and royal blue. The central stripe is white. In the upper left quadrant of the flag is a large red heart.

DeBlase had no specific symbolism in mind when he designed the flag. He once said, "I will leave it to the viewer to interpret the colors and symbols."

DeBlase first presented the flag at International Mr. Leather (IML) on May 28, 1989. He considered the flag to be a first draft and expected the community would suggest changes to the design. While some community members wanted a say in the final design, the majority embraced DeBlase's original design as-is. To this day, the flag has not undergone any significant revisions.

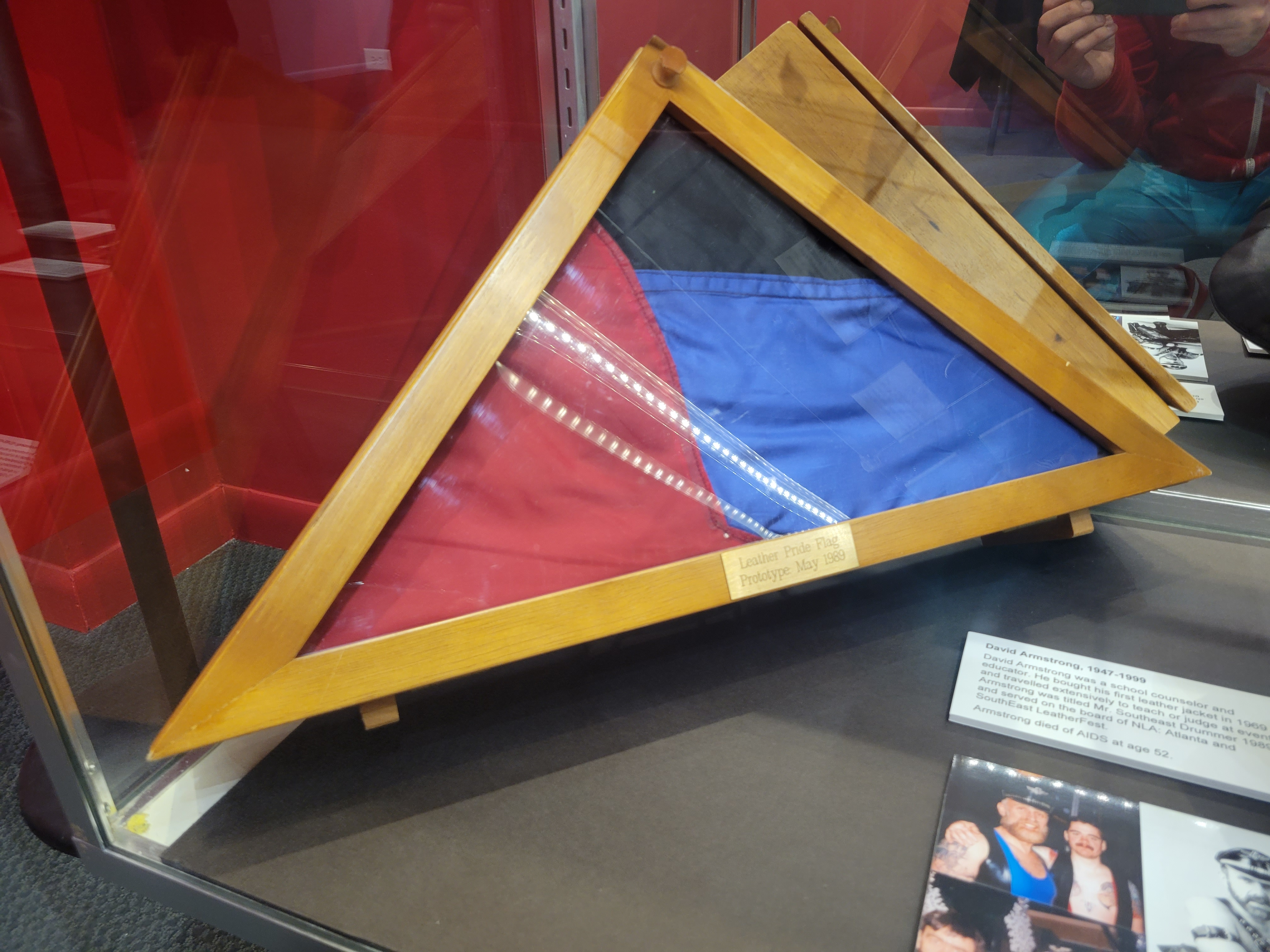
One of three original leather pride flags created by Tony DeBlase in 1989, on display at the Leather Archives & Museum.

In June 1989, the flag was used by the leather contingent in a Portland, Oregon pride parade, which was its first appearance at a pride parade.

By 1990, IML had incorporated the flag's design into the sash awarded to IML contest winners.

In 1991, Melbourne Leather Men became the first club to incorporate the design elements of the leather pride flag into their club colors.

On December 12, 2000, NLA Florida presented a suggested pledge of allegiance to the leather pride flag at its holiday party in Fort Lauderdale, which reads, "I pledge allegiance to the Leather Pride flag, and the union of Leather people for which it stands, with safety, sanity and consent for all."

For the 24th annual Folsom Street Fair, held September 30, 2007, the official poster artwork was a controversial photo featuring well-known LGBT and BDSM community members in festive and fetish attire including Sister Roma "as players in an innovative version of the culturally iconographic" The Last Supper by Leonardo da Vinci, complete with table draped with the leather pride flag and "cluttered with sex toys, whips, and various (BDSM) restraints". The image by FredAlert was used on the official event guide and produced as collector's posters that were displayed throughout the city as advertising for the event.

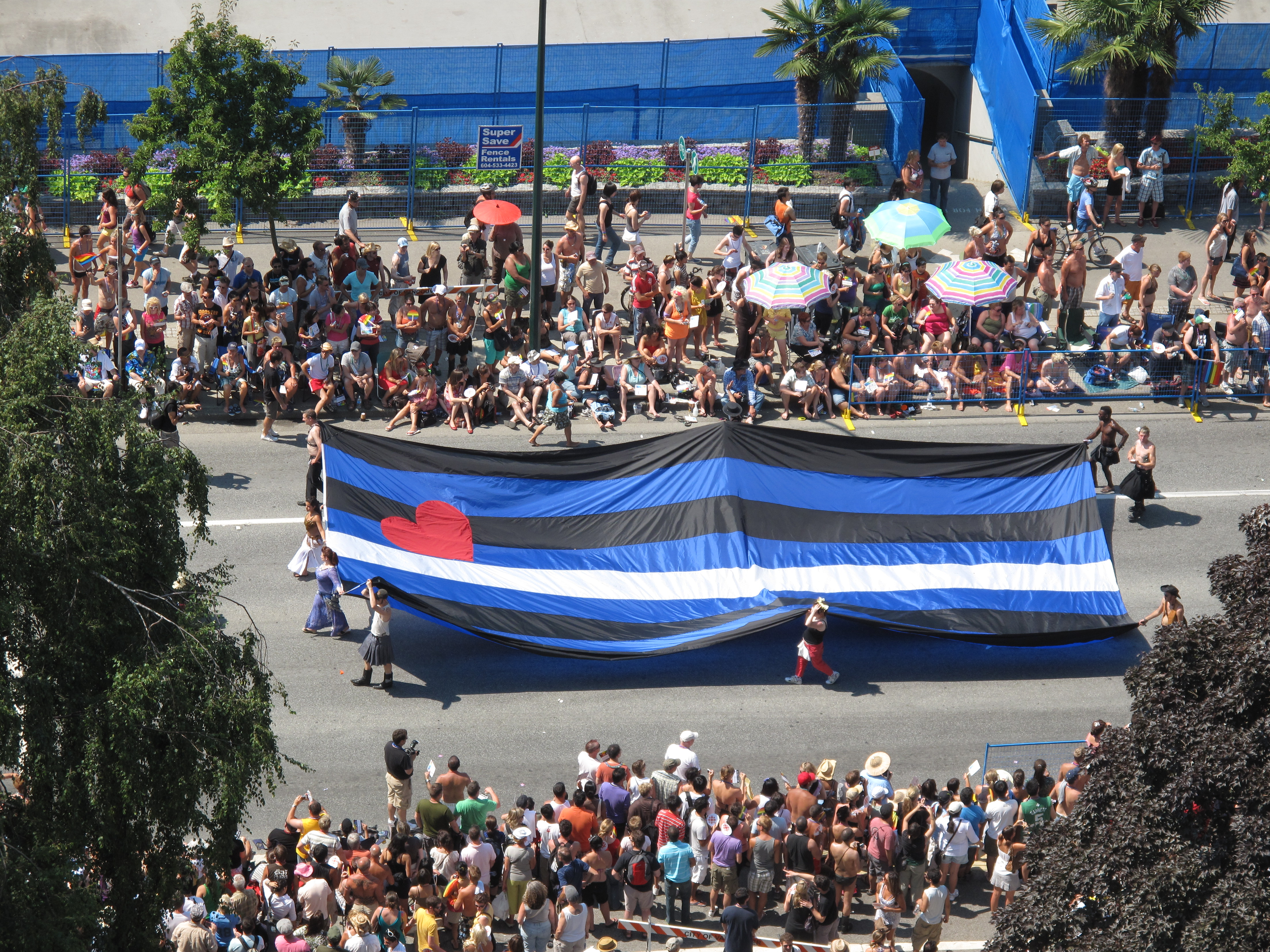
Leather pride flag at Vancouver Pride Parade (2009)

== Significance ==
Over time the flag has been embraced as a unifying symbol for members of the leather, BDSM, and fetish communities irrespective of sexual orientation. In 2019, the Schwules Museum remarked on the flag's impact:

The Leather Pride flag is at the beginning of a long line of similar flags, marking a turning point in the history of the mostly gay leather and BDSM movements: moving away from secret signs and symbols (hanky cloths, for example) to more obvious and public visibility, both in the gay scene and society in general.

== Notable flags ==
=== Original flag (Chicago) ===
One of the three original flags that DeBlase assembled was donated to the Leather Archives & Museum (LA&M), where it is on public display. LA&M also holds DeBlase's papers.

=== Twin Cities Pride (Minnesota) ===
Since 1998, the Twin Cities Pride parade in Minnesota has featured a "curb-to-curb and a block long" leather pride flag measuring approximately 75 x 50 feet. The first such flag was donated to LA&M in 2008.

=== San Francisco Armory ===
In 2006, fetish pornography studio Kink.com bought the San Francisco Armory building. The company flew the leather pride flag atop the armory and featured imagery of the flag atop the armory in the intro to many of its videos.

=== Leather and LGBTQ Cultural District (San Francisco) ===
The leather pride flag is featured throughout San Francisco's Leather and LGBTQ Cultural District. The San Francisco South of Market Leather History Alley, which opened in 2017, features the flag as well as metal bootprints honoring DeBlase, among other important members of the city's leather community. Since 2023, a 20 x 30 foot leather pride flag has flown 80 feet high above Eagle Plaza (adjacent to the San Francisco Eagle).

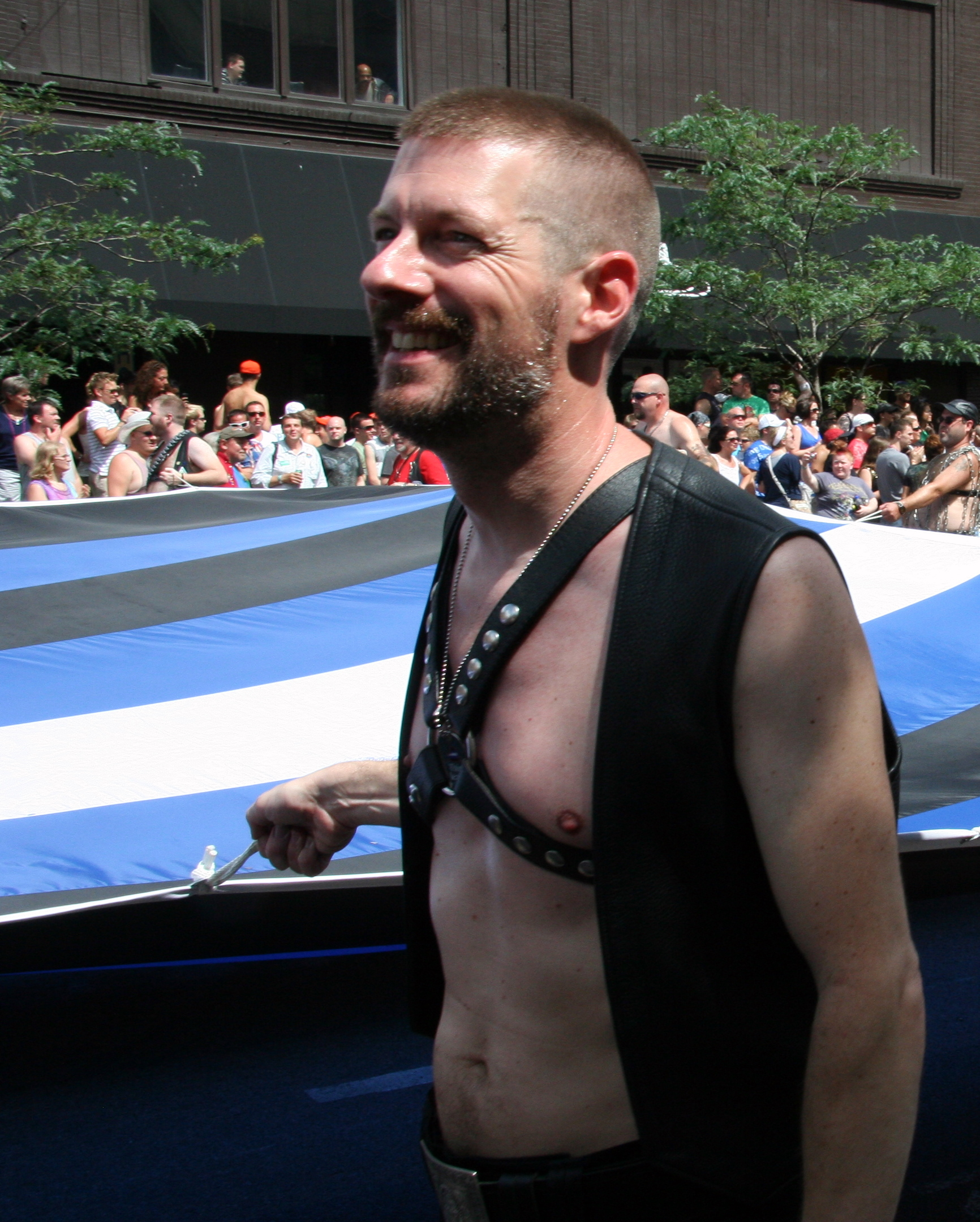
Twin Cities Pride, Minnesota

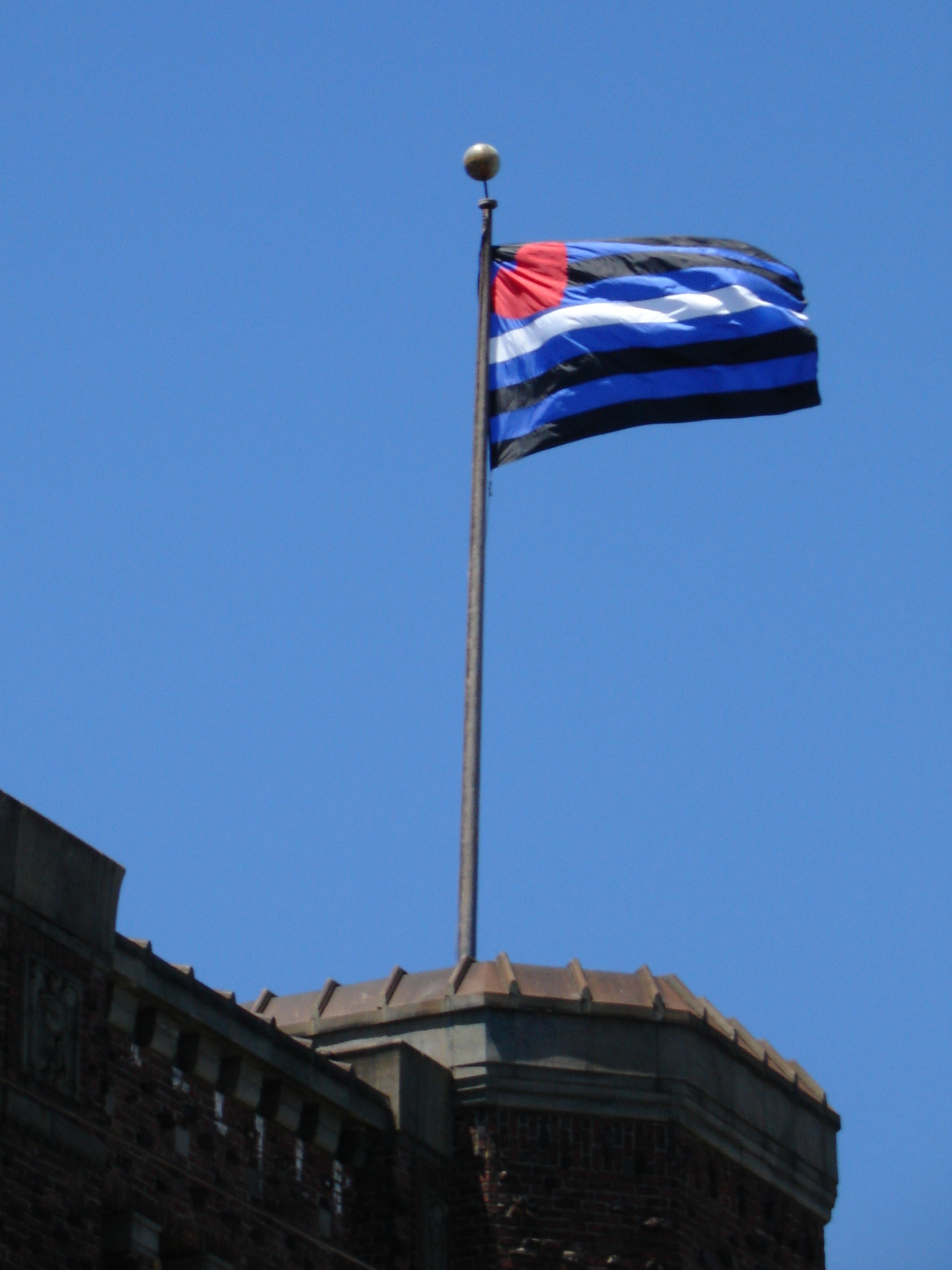
San Francisco Armory (2008)

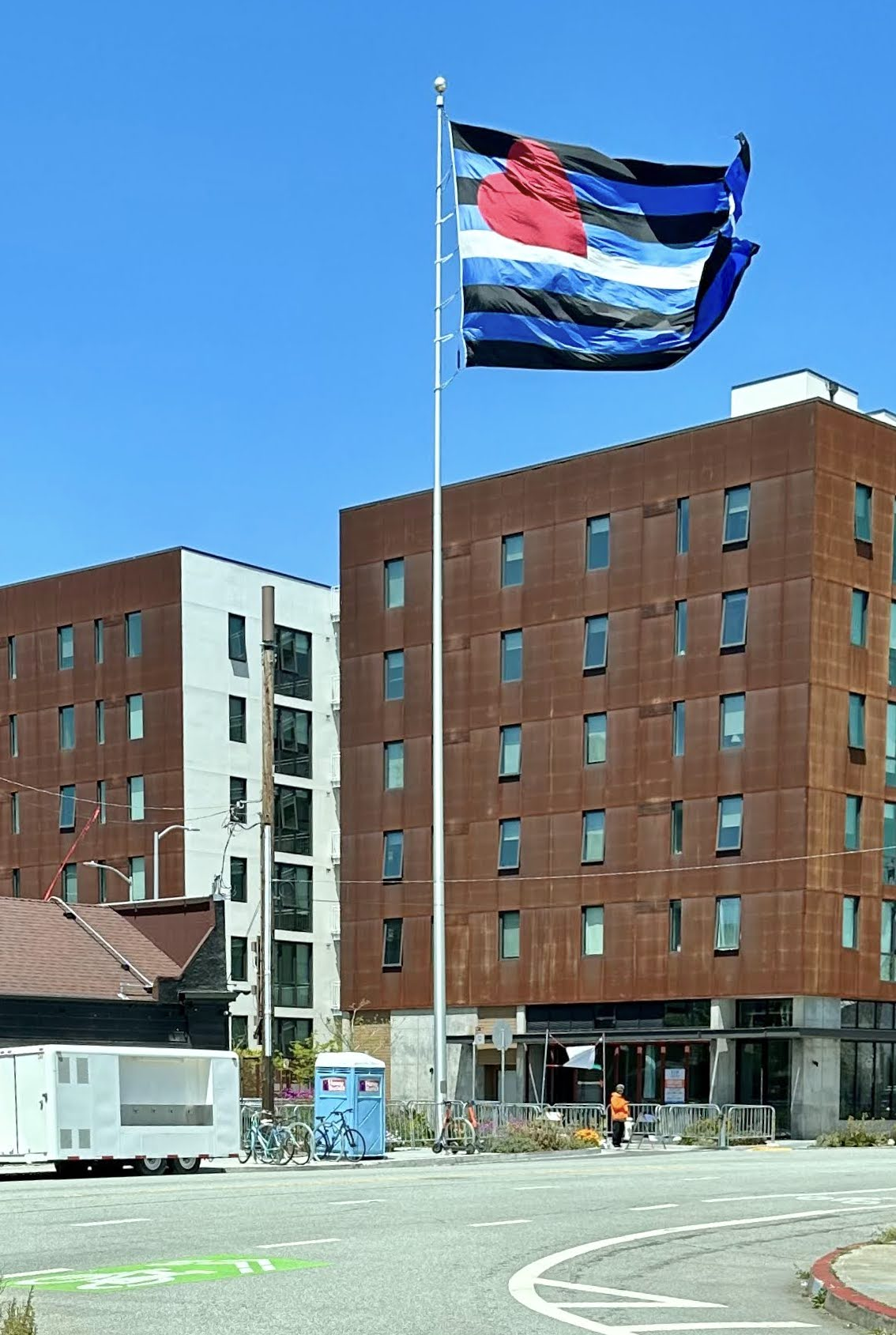
Eagle Plaza, San Francisco

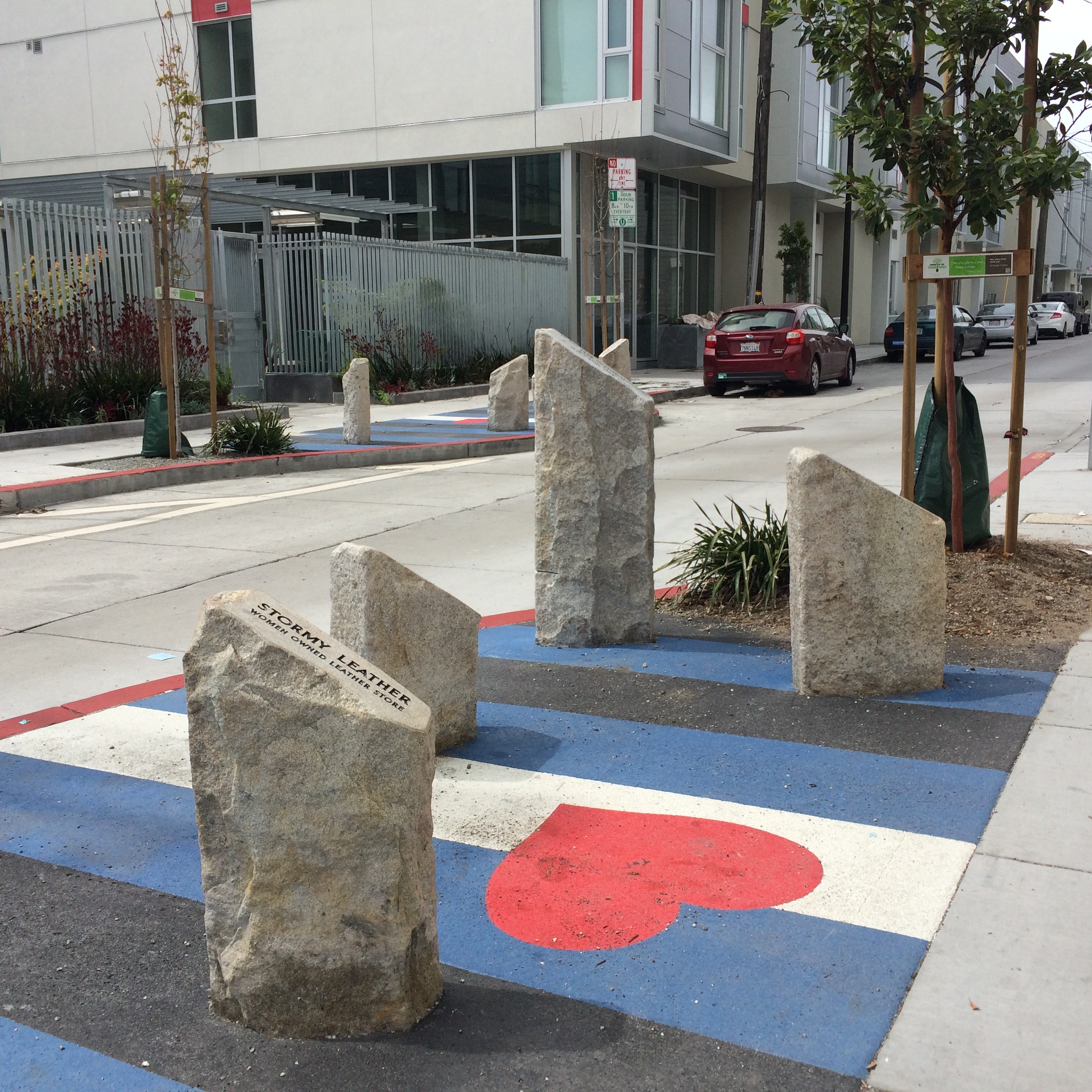
South of Market Leather History Alley, San Francisco

== Variations ==
Although Tony DeBlase is quoted as saying the design of the leather pride flag, which he created, is copyrighted in the U.S. (as well as all countries where the Berne Convention standards apply), copyright is automatic, and need not be obtained through official registration with any government office. Once an idea has been produced as a tangible form, for example by securing it in a fixed medium (such as a drawing, sheet music, photograph, a videotape, or a computer file), the copyright holder is entitled to enforce their exclusive rights.

Nevertheless, variations on the original leather pride flag have been created. On September 18, 1990, Clive Platman (Mr. Australia Drummer) presented Tony DeBlase with an Australian version of the flag, incorporating the Southern Cross featured on the flag of Australia, with the original design of the leather pride flag. On October 11, 1991, at the opening ceremonies of Living in Leather, a Canadian version of the leather pride flag was presented, which added to the original flag's design a row of red maple leaves running horizontally through the white stripe. There is also a Mexican version of the leather pride flag.

Leather & Grace, a (now defunct) organization of Unitarian Universalist kinksters, founded in 2011, combined a red flaming chalice with the stripes of the leather pride flag for their logo.

The BDSM rights flag

The BDSM rights flag, designed by Tanos, a Master from the United Kingdom, is partially loosely based on the design of the leather pride flag and also includes a version of the BDSM Emblem (but not similar enough to fall within Steve Quagmyr's specific copyright claims for the Emblem). The BDSM rights flag is intended to represent the belief that people whose sexuality or relationship preferences include BDSM practices deserve the same human rights as everyone else, and should not be discriminated against for pursuing BDSM with consenting adults.

== See also ==
- LGBT Symbols
- Pride flag
- Rainbow flag
