= Pride Northwest =

LGBTQ nonprofit organization in Portland, Oregon

Pride Northwest, Inc.
- Logo
- Formation: 1994; 32 years ago
- Headquarters: Portland, Oregon
- Executive director: Debra Porta
- Website: pridenw.org

Pride Northwest, Inc. is a nonprofit organization based in Portland, Oregon, United States founded in 1994 which organizes the annual Portland Pride Festival.

== Portland LGBT Pride Festival and Parade ==
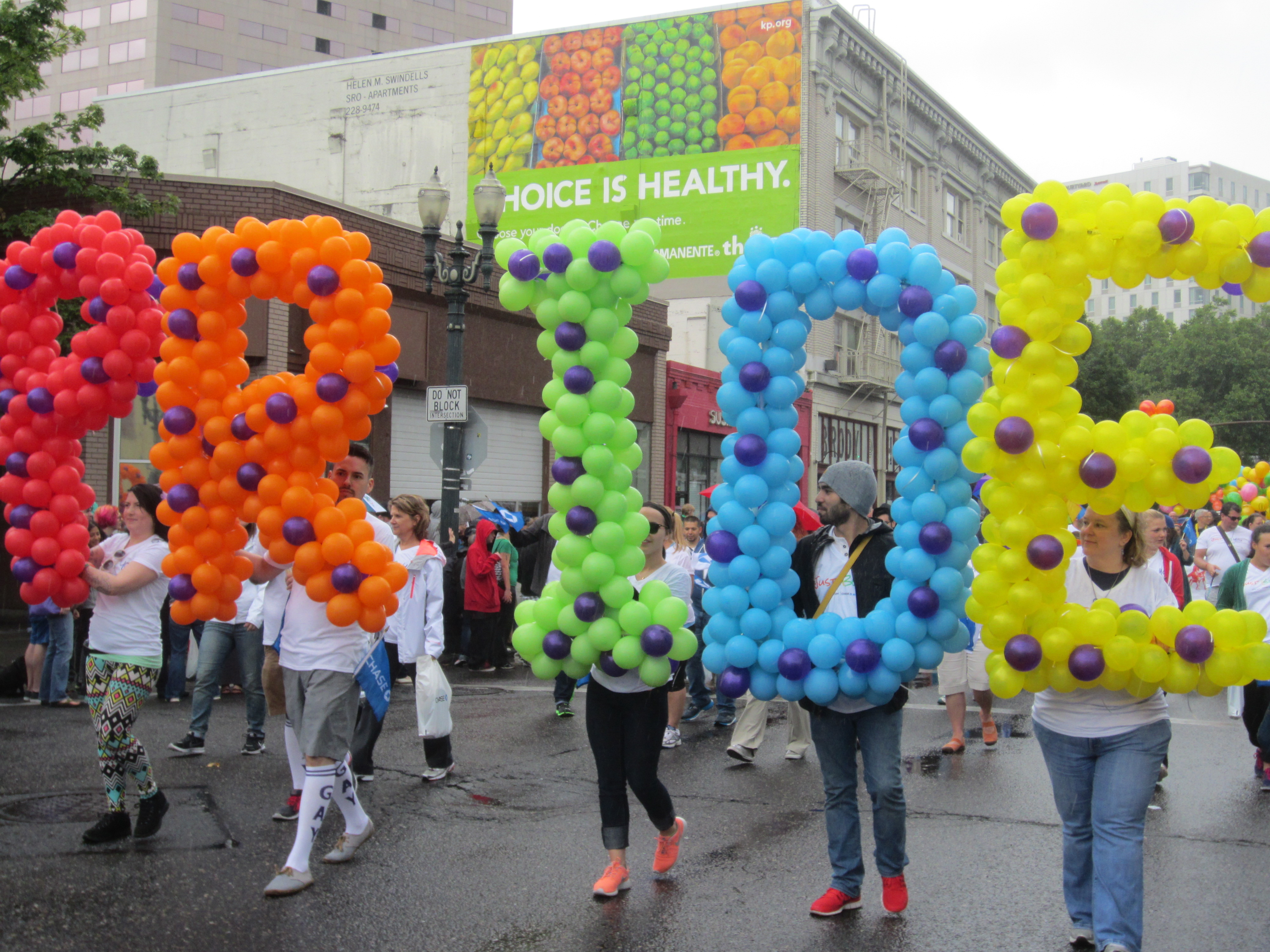
Portland Pride

Portland's Waterfront Pride Festival and Parade was historically held every June by Pride Northwest, until it moved to July in 2024 to avoid overlaps with other events in the city. Portland's Pride Weekend is normally scheduled the third weekend following Memorial Day, or the weekend after the conclusion of the Portland Rose Festival. It is a two-day-long event held along the Tom McCall Waterfront Park. The parade typically begins near West Burnside and Park Ave. and extends down Southwest Pine St. and Naito Parkway, finally ending near the Tom McCall Waterfront Park where the main festival is held.

In 2019, the parade attendance was estimated to be 45,000 people and approximately 8,000 people from over 200 groups and organizations participated in the parade. The festival is one of the largest donation-based pride events on the West Coast, with a suggested donation of $8 to enter the festival; however, the donation is not mandatory and everyone is allowed to enter. The festival features official events that are listed on Pride Northwest's official website, typically including performances by LGBTQ talent, a "Gaylabration" at Portland's Crystal Ballroom, the "Big Gay Boat Ride" on the Portland Spirit, and screenings of LGBTQ films. Many companies, businesses, churches, non-profits, agencies, sports teams, and LGBTQ organizations gather at the festival to celebrate and show support for the community.

=== History ===
Pride Northwest was established in 1994, but Portland's first official pride event took place in 1975 when a group of approximately 200 people organized a Gay Pride Fair near the South Park Blocks by Portland State University. The following year the Portland Town Council sponsored a fair that was held at the Waterfront Park, and one year later in 1977 the annual parade was added in addition to the fair after Mayor Neil Goldschmidt formally announced a "Gay Pride Day". The parade and festival have since been celebrated annually and are organized by Pride Northwest. In June 1989 the leather pride flag was used by the leather contingent in the parade, which was its first appearance at a pride parade.

=== Police involvement and controversy ===
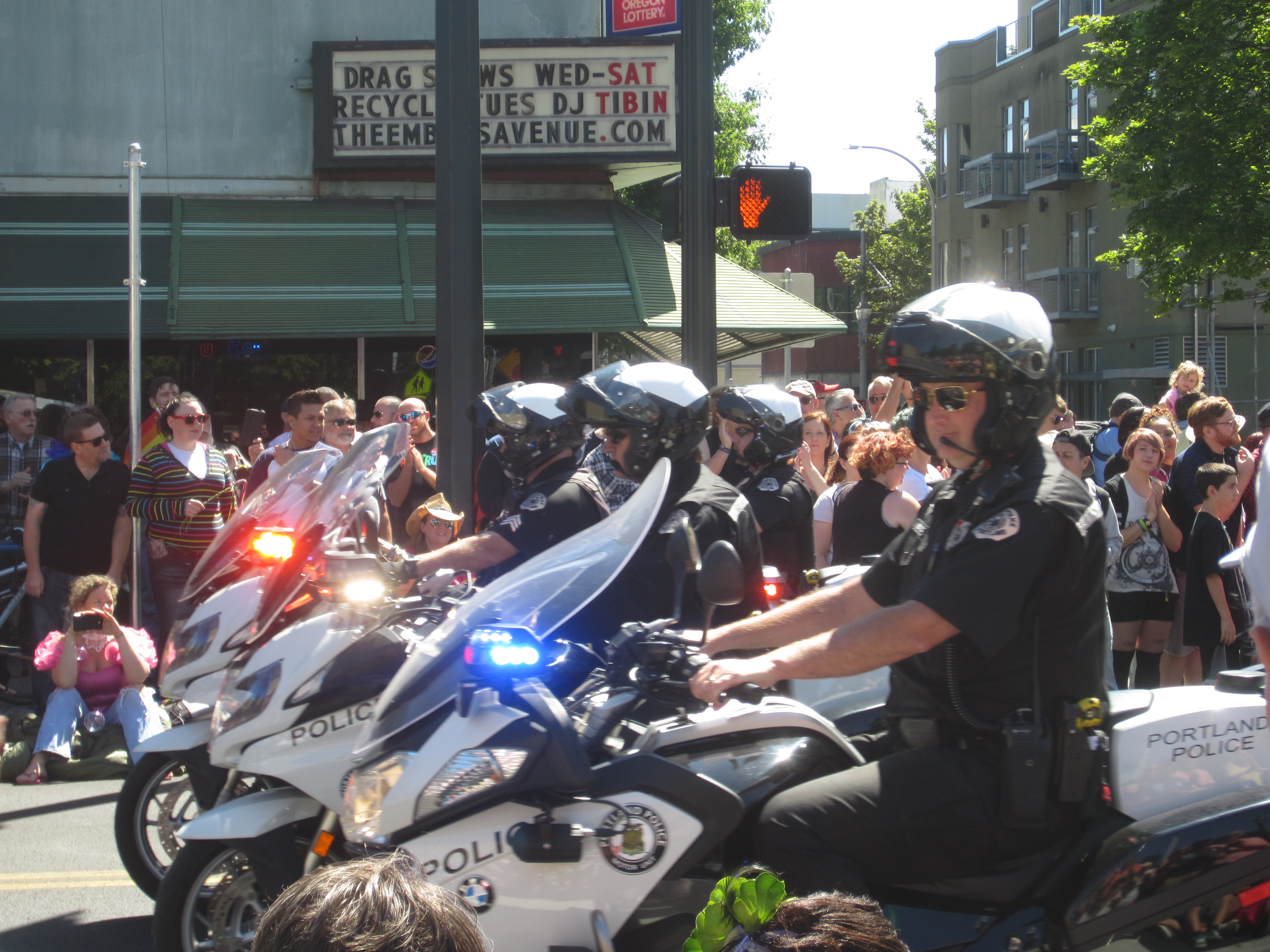
Police in Pride Parade, 2016

Portland police officers expressed outrage after LGBTQ organizers requested that officers who attend the festival and parade not show up in uniform. The request was met with backlash, notably from Portland LGBTQ officers, who expressed anger and sadness that they must hide a part of their identity from their own community and that asking officers to not be visible erases the struggles many LGBTQ officers have faced coming out and being visible in a patriarchal institution like the police force.

=== Traffic impact ===
The festival is known for having a large impact on Portland traffic that affects drivers downtown. The parade occupies Northwest Park Avenue and West Burnside Street and extends north on Southwest Broadway, east on Northwest Davis Street, and south on Naito Parkway. Drivers are encouraged to avoid parking near or along the parade route as cars parked within a two-block radius are removed. Traffic is also impacted by the festival that takes place at the Tom McCall Waterfront Park. The official parade route can be found on the Pride Northwest official website. Pride Northwest encourages festival and parade attendees and participants to use public transit, rideshare, and taxi services to reduce traffic impact.
