= Finistère (novel) =

1951 novel by Fritz Peters

- Author: Fritz Peters
- Publisher: Farrar, Straus and Giroux, Hirsch Giovanni Publishing (2024)
- Publication date: 1951
- Pages: 356
- ISBN: 978-1957241081

Finistère is a 1951 novel written by American writer Fritz Peters. The novel is about a teenager who falls in love with his tennis instructor at a boarding school he was placed in after moving to France. It details the issues on the effects of divorce and the problems faced with homosexual relationships during that time period. It was a bestseller, receiving a first printing run of 350,000 copies.

== Plot ==
Set in the 1920s, the main character, Matthew Cameron, moves to France after his parents' divorce. He struggles to fit in until he forges a forbidden relationship with his tennis instructor, Michel Garnier. It focuses on the failure of their families and society to accept their same-sex relationship.

== Reception ==
The novel was referred to as "very good" and "very depressing" by The Daily Telegraph. Herbert West of The New York Times said it was "the best novel I have ever read on the theme of homosexuality and its tragic consequences in a world made up of selfish, ruthless, cruel, egocentric people."

== Adaptation ==
The movie rights to Finistère were acquired by Hirsch Giovanni Entertainment in 2020. In 2024, it was released in audiobook format, voiced by Emile Hirsch.
