= Donna Sachet =

American drag actor, singer, community activist and writer

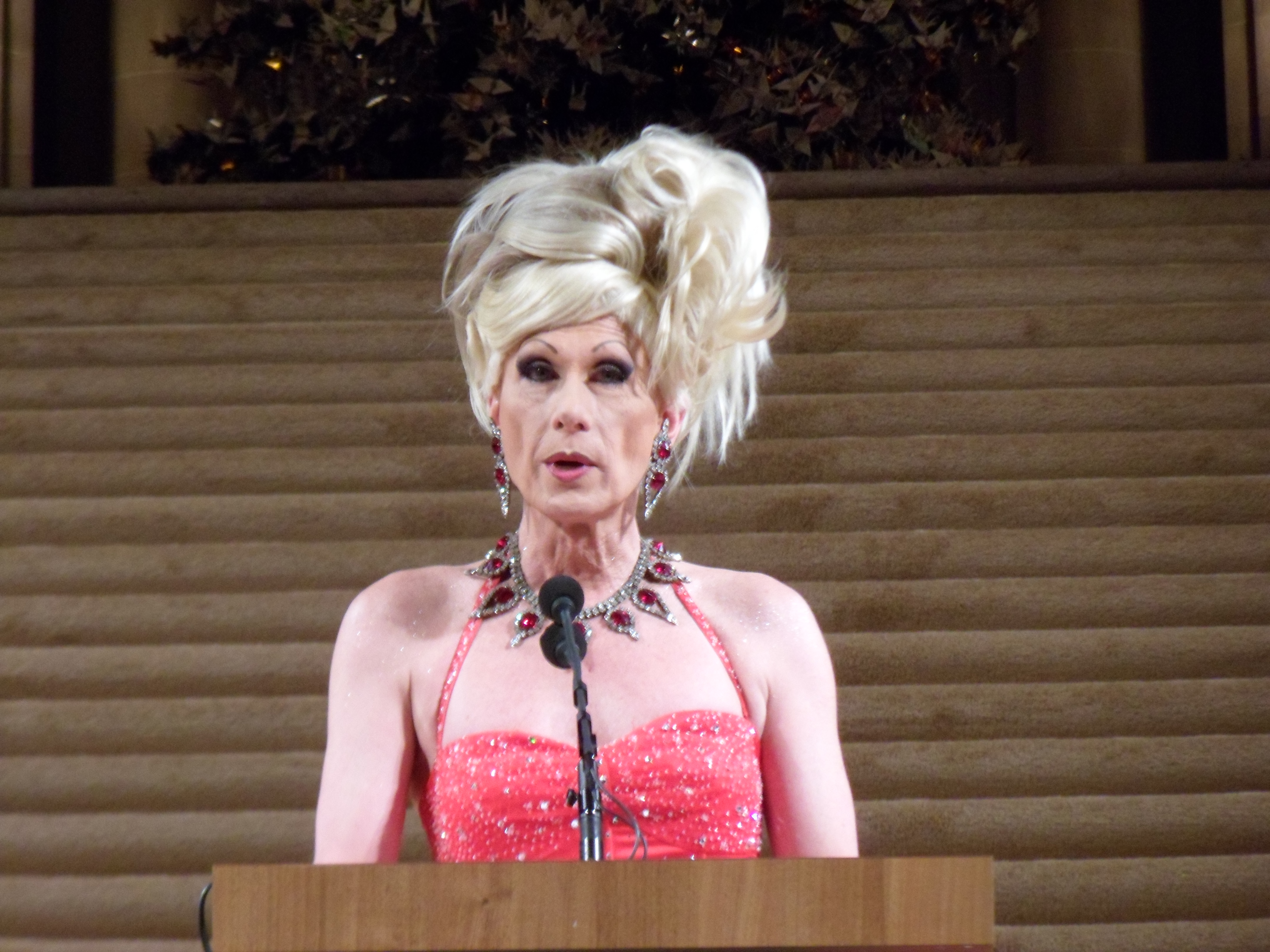
- Sachet in 2013
- Born: Kirk Reeves; South Carolina, U.S.
- Occupations: Performer; writer; activist
- Website: sundaysadrag.com

Donna Sachet is the stage name of Kirk Reeves, an American drag actor, singer, community activist, and writer based in San Francisco.

== Early life ==
Born as Kirk Reeves in South Carolina, Sachet attended Vanderbilt University, then she went to New York. A job opportunity brought Reeves to San Francisco. At a San Francisco Gay Men's Chorus event, she lip-synced to a Donna Summer song with a significant swagger which inspired her name.

== Career ==
Sachet has been awarded many community honors, including serving as grand marshal in the San Francisco Pride parade and being named first lady of the Castro district by California Senator Mark Leno. She was elected by the Imperial Court System as the 30th Absolute Empress of San Francisco with Brian C. Benamati in 1995. She recently has served on the boards of the San Francisco LGBT Community Center, the AIDS Emergency Fund, Positive Resource Center, the Imperial Council and the state board of Equality California. She co-chaired the San Francisco GLAAD Media Awards for four years. Sachet serves as an unofficial liaison for the LGBT and leather communities.

She currently writes a biweekly column for the SF Bay Times, wrote a quarterly newsletter geared to the LGBTQ community for the SF Convention & Visitors Bureau, and was the host of "Sunday's a Drag" a female impersonation, brunch show at Harry Denton's Starlight Room in the St Francis Hotel for 15 years. With Tim Gaskin, she co-hosted a Comcast weekly LGBTQ television series called OUT Spoken for five years. On September 29, 2009, Sachet became the first drag performer to sing the United States National Anthem at the opening of a Major League Baseball game.

Sachet has presided at the lighting ceremony for the Rainbow World Fund's World Tree of Hope in San Francisco City Hall and Grace Cathedral for 10 years, presided over the lighting of the Castro Holiday Tree, and cut the ribbon for the opening of the Castro Farmers' Market for 10 years. Donna Sachet co-created with Gary Virginia the annual Pride Brunch honoring the Grand Marshals of the SF Pride Parade and raising money for PRC. She created Songs of the Season, a holiday cabaret show benefiting AIDS Emergency Fund and PRC, now in its 30th year at Feinstein's at the Nikko Hotel.

Donna Sachet starred in three successful runs of Artful Circle Theatre's musical drag version of The Women, entitled Jungle Red, two original performances of Who Murdered Donna Sachet?, several guest appearances in Incentive to Intrigue's The Daddy, the Diva, and the Detective murder mystery dinners, a six-week run of A.R. Gurney's Love Letters, and four weeks as Sylvia in Ruthless, The Musical. Donna Sachet is the subject of Nick Jimenez' student film Sachet: a short film and had a featured role in Adam Reeves' full feature comedy film, My Brother's Shoes.

Donna Sachet can be heard on recordings of the benefit holiday compilation Carols Across America and Songs of the Season 2013.

== Awards and honors ==
- 1995 Darrell Yee Award from AIDS Emergency Fund shared with Brian Benamati
- 1996 Cable Car Entertainer of the Year, City of San Francisco
- 1997 International Jose Honors Imperial Award
- 1998 Interclub Fund's Most Supportive Non-Leather Title Holder
- 2002 Designation as the Leather Empress by the Leather Community
- 2004 Sainthood from the Sisters of Perpetual Indulgence
- 2005 Bob Cramer Humanitarian Award
- 2005 San Francisco Police Officers Pride Alliance Award
- 2005 Community Grand Marshal of the SF LGBT Pride Parade
- 2007 Heritage of Pride Award from the SF LGBT Pride Committee
- 2009 Academy of Friends Kile Ozier Founder's Award
