= The Tool Box (bar) =

Gay leather bar in San Francisco

General information
- Type: Gay bar, Leather bar
- Location: 399 Forth Street, San Francisco
- Coordinates: 37°46′53″N 122°23′59″W
- Opened: 1962
- Closed: 1971
- Owner: Bill Ruquy

The Tool Box was a leather bar for gay men in San Francisco that operated from 1962 to 1971 on the east corner of 4th Street and Harrison Street. It was the first leather bar in the South of Market, and a meeting spot where influential personalities of the early San Francisco leather scene gathered. After a prominent feature in Life magazine in 1964, it was considered the archetypal leather bar, helping to cement San Francisco's reputation as the "gay capital" of the US. The bar's history was short-lived: from 1965 onwards, the epicenter of the leather scene shifted towards Folsom Street (most notably Febe's bar), which ultimately led to its closing in 1971. The Tool Box is commemorated at the San Francisco South of Market Leather History Alley.

The patronage of the Tool Box included influential personalities of the early San Francisco leather scene, among others artist Bill Tellman, Jack H. (owner of the Detour and the Slot, co-owner of Febe's), artist Mike Caffee (creator of the logo and a statue for Febe's), as well as the Satyrs Motorcycle Club (oldest gay motorcycle club in the US) from Los Angeles. The artist Chuck Arnett also worked as a bartender at the Tool Box.

== Reception ==
On June 26th 1964, Life magazine published a cover story titled "Homosexuality in America", which not only brought San Francisco as a hub of gay life into public consciousness, but also the Tool Box. The article opened with a two-page photo-spread of its interior with patrons dressed in leather beneath a mural, photographed by Bill Eppridge. In the 1991 anthology, Leatherfolk, Jack Fritscher described the article as "an image-liberating historical issue that was read across the nation as an invitation to come to San Francisco and be a man's man". The article also included an interview with Bill Ruquy, part owner of the bar, who detailed the strict dress code that excluded tennis shoes among other garments that did not fit the biker aesthetic. Especially for queer men living in conservative small towns, the publication shed a spotlight on this gay subculture of butch leathermen, who did not fit the widespread clichés of the 'effeminate homosexual'—and where to find them. Thus, the Life piece unintentionally became an advertisement for the leather scene and ultimately a catalyst of gay emancipation.

Drummer magazine dedicated an article about the demolition of the Tool Box in its second volume in August 1975, titled "Requiem for a toolbox". This further illustrates the importance that contemporaries awarded to the Tool Box's role in gay leather history.

== Murals ==
The interior of the bar prominently featured oversized murals depicting a crowd of tough-looking masculine leather-clad men in black and white, among them sailors, bikers, businessmen and construction workers. The inscription read "Marlboro Country...", casting the depicted as a whole roster of Marlboro Men. The mural, consisting of four panels in total, was painted in 1962 by artist Chuck Arnett. Two panels were located along the south-facing walls towards Harrison Street, and two west-facing, on the glass storefront windows looking out onto 4th Street. During the 1960s, Arnett painted several replicas of the murals on wood panels, one of which was donated to the GLBT Historical Society's archive in 2021. One of the depicted men has been identified as the biker and photographer Joe Winters.

After the closing of the bar, the building was torn down as part of the city's South of Market redevelopment plan. During the lengthy demolition and construction work, one wall remained virtually undamaged for several years, exposing the two remaining panels of the mural to passers-by. This can be seen in historical photographs from the collection of the GLBT Historical Society.

In 2012, the artist Nayland Blake recreated Arnett's iconic Tool Box mural for his exhibition "FREE!LOVE!TOOL!BOX!", at Yerba Buena Center for the Arts in San Francisco.

The San Francisco South of Market Leather History Alley permanently displays a reproduction of Arnett's Tool Box Mural.

== See also ==
- Chuck Arnett
- List of LGBTQ bars
