= Justin Spring (writer) =

American author and art historian

Justin Spring is an American art historian and author. His 2010 biography of Samuel Steward was a finalist for the 2010 National Book Award for Nonfiction.

== Books ==
=== Secret Historian ===
The book, Secret Historian: The Life and Times of Samuel Steward, Professor, Tattoo Artist, and Sexual Renegade tells the story of Samuel Steward, who lived as an openly gay man from 1909 to 1993.

Spring acquired a trove of Steward's personal files after his death from the executor of his estate. This surfeit of records included over 80 boxes containing Steward's personal journals, writings about his sexuality, correspondence with other artists, a draft of a memoir, drafts for semi-autobiographical fictional material, pictures, drawings, and the Stud File. The Stud File was a file drawer containing 746 individual index cards containing documentation and intimate details of all 746 men Steward had sexual relations with. The Stud File included famous figures such as Rock Hudson, Rudolph Valentino, Lord Alfred Douglas, and Thornton Wilder. In the New York Times, historian Martin Duberman, referring to the trove of Steward's records and Spring's biography, stated that many gay people lived closeted, secretive lives throughout the 20th century, and to find such primary source material is extraordinary.

In an interview with Lambda Literary, Spring stated that he approached ten different publishers and they all rejected the manuscript for Secret Historian, being wary of the homosexuality and the sexualized source material. Spring stated that he attempted to publish an excerpt from the book in the magazine Vanity Fair in hopes of eventually publishing the entire manuscript as a biography. He states Vanity Fair rejected the material as it was too obscene and hypersexualized. Spring was eventually able to publish his biography with Farrar, Straus and Giroux after researching the source material for 10 years. Secret Historian was paired with a companion book by Spring: An Obscene Diary: The Visual World of Sam Steward. This companion book was a picture book which included Steward's drawings, paintings, placards, photographs and index cards from his Stud File.

Writing in The New York Times, Patricia Cohen stated that the biography was a rare glimpse into the life of a gay man in the 20th century. Cohen stated: "As new biographies of artists and writers like E.M. Forster detail the effects of sexual repression on their work, Steward’s history shows what a life of openness, when embraced, entailed day to day.

=== The Gourmands' Way ===
Spring's 2017 book, The Gourmands' Way: Six Americans in Paris and the Birth of a New Gastronomy, documents six chef-authors as they started their careers in post-World War II France. The subjects of the biography are Julia Child, MFK Fisher, Alexis Lichine, AJ Liebling, Richard Olney, and Alice B. Toklas. Writing in The New York Times, Ruth Reichl said that Spring's biography "offered us an entirely new perspective on a group of people we thought we knew." Reichl noted that the biography paints a portrait of these chefs that is well-researched but that is different from the prevailing historical perspective.

=== Artists ===
Spring has also written biographies of the artists Fairfield Porter and Paul Cadmus. A reviewer described the Porter biography as "a fully rounded portrait of an important American painter who is still too often overlooked simply for his choice of subject."
