= Chuck Arnett =

American visual artist, dancer (1928–1988)

- Born: February 15, 1928; Bogalusa, Louisiana, U.S.
- Died: March 2, 1988 (aged 60); San Francisco, California, U.S.
- Occupations: Visual artist, dancer

Charles "Chuck" Arnett (February 15, 1928 – March 2, 1988) was an American visual artist and dancer who was born in Bogalusa, Louisiana, and died in San Francisco. His best-known work is the Tool Box mural (1962).

== Biography ==
Arnett grew up in Bogalusa and New Orleans, with him later claiming New Orleans as his hometown. He danced in the local ballet successfully for several seasons. In 1951, he moved to New York City to better pursue the career he wanted to make for himself in the world of professional dance. Arriving with letters of introduction and names of people to contact from his time as a dancer in New Orleans, he quickly settled into the life of those in Manhattan who referred to themselves as "theatrical gypsies."

In the next few years, his time was divided between the best dance classes he could get enrolled into, practice, auditioning for parts, and rehearsing and then performing on the stage. He then performed for some time with the National Ballet of Canada; the time he spent with the National Ballet was the only full-time, permanent employment he would ever hold in his life.

In the early 1960s, Arnett assisted Dom Orejudos in creating murals for the Gold Coast bar in Chicago. For a time, Arnett was involved with Orejudo's partner Chuck Renslow. In late 1962, Arnett moved to San Francisco. There he worked at the Tool Box, a gay bar at 339 4th St in the South of Market neighborhood. The Tool Box was one of the first bars in the city catering specifically to the leather community and gay motorcycle clubs.

Beginning in 1962 Arnett painted a series of life-size murals inside the Tool Box depicting a wide cross-section of gay society. The bar and the murals were made famous by the June 1964 Paul Welch Life article entitled "Homosexuality In America," the first time a national publication reported on gay issues. The article opened with a two-page spread of one of Arnett's murals. The article described San Francisco as "The Gay Capital of America" and inspired many gay leathermen to move there.

Arnett created art for other San Francisco gay bars and businesses such as the Ambush, the Balcony, the Red Star Saloon and a psychedelic black light mural for The Stud. Over his career he depicted a wide variety of subject matter in his art, ranging from astrology to bar scenes to fisting. His art was featured in the magazine Drummer and exhibited at Fey-Way Studios.

Samuel Steward tattooed Arnett in the 1960s.

One busy night Rudolf Nureyev came into the Tool Box with several men obviously from the opera house where he was performing. He was seated at the bar and with many people watching, removed the coat he had on, revealing a leather jacket, to applause. Arnett brought his drink, a cognac, in the best glass the house could provide, and when he finished it and left, Arnett took the glass.

Arnett died on March 2, 1988, in San Francisco from AIDS.

== Cultural impact & legacy ==
The San Francisco South of Market Leather History Alley, consists of four works of art along Ringold Alley honoring leather culture, including a black granite stone etched with a narrative by Gayle Rubin and a reproduction of Arnett's Tool Box mural. Another of the works of art is bronze bootprints along the curb which honor 28 people (including Arnett) who were an important part of the leather communities of San Francisco.

Some of Arnett's papers and artwork is housed at the Leather Archives & Museum and GLBT Historical Society, including one of the Tool Box murals.

In 2006, historian Jack Fritscher wrote:

"If there is a gay Mount Rushmore of four great pioneer pop artists, the faces would be Chuck Arnett, Etienne, A. Jay, and Tom of Finland."

In 2012, the Yerba Buena Center for the Arts exhibited a recreation of Arnett's Tool Box mural.
