= Fritz Peters (author) =

American author (1913–1979)

- Born: Arthur Anderson Peters; 1913; Madison, Wisconsin
- Died: 1979 (aged 65–66); Las Cruces, New Mexico
- Relatives: Margaret C. Anderson; Jane Heap
- Writing career
- Period: 1949-1978
- Notable works: Finistère (1951); Boyhood with Gurdjieff (1964)

Fritz Peters (1913–1979) was an American author who wrote on themes of spirituality, mental illness, homosexuality, self and society. A nonconformist, Peters' most successful novel was Finistère, published in 1951, which sold over 350,000 copies and was an influential and unapologetic work of early gay literature.

== Early life and education ==
Peters was born Arthur Anderson Peters in Madison, Wisconsin where he spent the early years of his life. Due to instability in his family life, Peters spent his childhood between Europe and the United States. Fritz's parents' divorce and his mother’s nervous breakdown in the mid-1920s left young Fritz adrift. His aunt, Margaret Anderson, and her lover, Jane Heap stepped in to care for him and his brother. They took Fritz to France, where he met Gertrude Stein, Hemingway, E.E. Cummings, and other significant figures of the avant garde.

Fritz lived and studied at the Institute for the Harmonious Development of Man, founded by the controversial Russian mystic, G. I. Gurdjieff. Gurdjieff became a father figure, eventually naming Fritz his "successor" and "true son".

== Career ==
Peters was described by Variety as someone who "wrote frank and intimate depictions of homosexuality, spirituality, and mental health struggles." He released The World Next Door in 1949. The novel is a story of a veteran hospital and a subject's experience while living there. It was later adapted into a play for Broadway by Stanley Young.

In 1951, Peters release his second novel, Finistère. The novel is about a teenager who falls in love with his tennis instructor at a boarding school he was placed in after moving to France. It details the issues on the effects of divorce and the problems faced with homosexual relationships during that time period. It was a bestseller, receiving a first printing run of 350,000 copies. He also released The Descent in 1952.

Peters released a series of memoirs, including Boyhood with Gurdjieff, released in 1964, Gurdiieff Remembered, released in 1971, and Balanced Man, released in 1978, which detailed his experience with Georges Gurdjieff.

== Bibliography ==
=== Novels ===
- The World Next Door (1949)
- Finistère (1951)
- The Descent (1952)

=== Memoirs ===
- Boyhood with Gurdjieff (1964)
- Gurdjieff Remembered (1971)
- Balanced Man (1978)

== Death and legacy ==
Peters died in 1979 in Las Cruces, New Mexico. The movie and publishing rights to his books were acquired by Hirsch Giovanni Entertainment in 2022. In 2024, the books Finistère and Boyhood with Gurdjieff were released in audiobook format, voiced by Emile Hirsch. Unapologetically Fritz, a documentary on his life, also went into production the same year.
