= Alan Selby =

British-born businessman and leather subculture community leader

- Selby at the Mr. S Leather store on 7th Street in San Francisco (circa 1980).
- Born: Alan Henry Sniders; 1929; Yorkshire, England
- Died: 2004 (aged 74–75); San Francisco, California

Alan Selby (1929–2004), born Alan Henry Sniders, was an English-born American gay businessman and leader in the San Francisco leather community. He was known by many as "the Mayor of Folsom Street". He claimed to have created the first hanky code with his business partners at Leather 'n' Things in 1972, when their bandana supplier inadvertently doubled their order and the expanded code would help them sell the extra colors they had received. However, other sources dispute this being the origin of the hanky code.

== Biography ==
Alan Selby was born as Alan Henry Sniders in Yorkshire, England. He was a member of the Royal Navy.

In 1979, Selby and his partner Peter Jacklin moved to San Francisco and founded the fetish clothing manufacturer Mr. S Leather. At one point, the company was operated by Judy Tallwing McCarthey.

Selby co-founded and fundraised for the San Francisco AIDS Emergency Fund, which was founded in 1982. Following the death of his partner, Peter Jacklin, from AIDS in 1987, Selby became a prominent figure in the community response against the AIDS epidemic.

Selby died from complications of emphysema at the age of 75 in May 2004 in San Francisco. In 2019, an exhibition at the GLBT Historical Society Museum celebrated Selby's life and legacy.

== Awards and legacy ==
- In 1988, Selby was awarded the Steve Maidhof Award for National or International Work by the National Leather Association International.
- In 1989, he received the Man of the Year Award as part of the Pantheon of Leather Awards.
- In 1999, he and Leonard Dworkin received the Forebear Award as part of the Pantheon of Leather Awards.
- In 2004, Selby received the Lifetime Achievement Award as part of the Pantheon of Leather Awards.
- In 2013, Selby was posthumously inducted into the Leather Hall of Fame.
- In 2017, Selby was honored along with other notables, named on bronze bootprints, as part of San Francisco South of Market Leather History Alley.
