= Feminist views on sexuality =

Feminist views on sexuality widely vary. Many feminists, particularly radical feminists, are highly critical of what they see as sexual objectification and sexual exploitation in the media and society. Radical feminists are often opposed to the sex industry, including opposition to prostitution and pornography. Other feminists define themselves as sex-positive feminists and believe that a wide variety of expressions of female sexuality can be empowering to women when they are freely chosen. Some feminists support efforts to reform the sex industry to become less sexist, such as the feminist pornography movement.

== Feminist sex wars ==
The feminist sex wars and lesbian sex wars, or simply the sex wars or porn wars, were acrimonious debates amongst feminists in the late 1970s and early 1980s. The sides were characterized by anti-porn and pro-sex groups with disagreements regarding sexuality, sexual representation, pornography, sadomasochism, the role of trans women in the lesbian community, and other sexual issues. The debate pitted anti-pornography feminism against sex-positive feminism, and the feminist movement was deeply divided as a result. The feminist sex wars are sometimes viewed as part of the division that led to the end of the second-wave feminist era and the beginning of third-wave feminism.

The two sides included anti-pornography feminists and sex-positive feminists. One of the more significant clashes between the pro-sex and anti-pornography feminists occurred at the 1982 Barnard Conference on Sexuality. Anti-pornography feminists were excluded from the events' planning committee, so they staged rallies outside the conference to show their disdain.

=== Feminist criticism of sexual exploitation and the sex industry ===
Many feminists denounce industries such as the sex industry as examples of misogynistic exploitation. Important anti-sex industry feminists included Andrea Dworkin and Catharine MacKinnon. The pair wanted civil laws restricting pornography. They viewed male sexual dominance as the root of all female oppression, and thus condemned pornography, prostitution, and other manifestations of male sexual power. The anti-pornography movement gained ground with the creation of Women Against Violence in Pornography and Media. During the time of the sex wars, it organized marches against the creators and distributors of pornography in San Francisco and led to Women Against Pornography, Feminists Fighting Pornography, and similarly oriented organizations and efforts across the United States.

=== Sex-positive feminism ===
The response by "sex-positive feminists" was one that promoted sex as an avenue of pleasure for women. Gayle Rubin and Patrick Califia were influential in this part of the movement. Other feminists who identify as "sex-positive" include Ellen Willis, Kathy Acker, Susie Bright, Carol Queen, Annie Sprinkle, Avedon Carol, Tristan Taormino, Rachel Kramer Bussel, Nina Hartley, and Betty Dodson. The Sex-positive feminism movement has become more popular in current times.

=== Feminism and pornography ===
Feminist views of pornography range from condemnation of pornography as a form of violence against women, to an embracing of some forms of pornography as a medium of feminist expression. Feminist debate on this issue reflects larger concerns surrounding feminist views on sexuality, and is closely related to feminist debates on prostitution, BDSM, and other issues. Pornography has been one of the most divisive issues in feminism, particularly among feminists in Anglophone countries.

==== Anti-pornography feminism ====
Radical feminist opponents of pornography—such as Andrea Dworkin, Catharine MacKinnon, Robin Morgan, Diana Russell, Alice Schwarzer, Gail Dines, and Robert Jensen—argue that pornography is harmful to women, and constitutes strong causality or facilitation of violence against women. Anti-pornography feminists, notably MacKinnon, charge that the production of pornography entails physical, psychological, and/or economic coercion of the women who perform and model in it. This is said to be true even when the women are being presented as enjoying themselves.

Anti-pornography feminists hold the view that pornography contributes to sexism, arguing that in pornographic performances the actresses are reduced to mere receptacles—objects—for sexual use and abuse by men. They argue that the narrative is usually formed around men's pleasure as the only goal of sexual activity, and that the women are shown in a subordinate role. Some opponents believe pornographic films tend to show women as being extremely passive, or that the acts which are performed on the women are typically abusive and solely for the pleasure of their sex partner. On-face ejaculation and anal rape are increasingly popular among men, following trends in porn. MacKinnon and Dworkin defined pornography as "the graphic sexually explicit subordination of women through pictures or words".

==== Anti-censorship and pro-pornography feminists ====
Pornography is seen as being a medium for women's sexual expression in this view. Sex-positive feminists view many radical feminist views on sexuality, including views on pornography, as being as oppressive as those of patriarchal religions and ideologies, and argue that anti-pornography feminist discourse ignores and trivializes women's sexual agency. Ellen Willis (who coined the term "pro-sex feminism") states "As we saw it, the claim that 'pornography is violence against women' was code for the neo-Victorian idea that men want sex and women endure it."

Sex-positive feminists take a variety of views towards existing pornography. Many sex-positive feminists see pornography as subverting many traditional ideas about women that they oppose, such as ideas that women do not like sex generally, only enjoy sex in a relational context, or that women only enjoy vanilla sex. They also argue that pornography sometimes shows women in sexually dominant roles and presents women with a greater variety of body types than are typical of mainstream entertainment and fashion.

Many feminists regardless of their views on pornography are opposed on principle to censorship. Even many feminists who see pornography as a sexist institution, also see censorship (including MacKinnon's civil law approach) as evil. In its mission statement, Feminists for Free Expression argues that censorship has never reduced violence, but historically been used to silence women and stifle efforts for social change. They point to the birth control literature of Margaret Sanger, the feminist plays of Holly Hughes, and works like Our Bodies, Ourselves and The Well of Loneliness as examples of feminist sexual speech which has been the target of censorship. FFE further argues that the attempt to fix social problems through censorship, "divert[s] attention from the substantive causes of social ills and offer a cosmetic, dangerous 'quick fix.'" They argue that instead a free and vigorous marketplace of ideas is the best assurance for achieving feminist goals in a democratic society.

Additionally, some feminists such as Wendy Kaminer, while opposed to pornography are also opposed to legal efforts to censor or ban pornography. In the late 1970s, Kaminer worked with Women Against Pornography, where she advocated in favor of private consciousness raising efforts and against legal efforts to censor pornography. She contributed a chapter to the anti-pornography anthology, Take Back the Night, wherein she defended First Amendment freedoms and explained the dangers of seeking legal solutions to the perceived problem of pornography. She opposed efforts by Catharine MacKinnon and Andrea Dworkin to define pornography as a civil rights violation, and she critiqued the pro-censorship movement in a 1992 article in The Atlantic entitled "Feminists Against the First Amendment."

===== Feminist pornography =====
Feminist pornography is pornography that is produced by and with feminist women. It is a small but growing segment of the pornography industry. According to Tristan Taormino, "Feminist porn both responds to dominant images with alternative ones and creates its own iconography."

Some pornographic actresses such as Nina Hartley, Ovidie, Madison Young, and Sasha Grey are also self-described sex-positive feminists, and state that they do not see themselves as victims of sexism. They defend their decision to perform in pornography as freely chosen, and argue that much of what they do on camera is an expression of their sexuality. It has also been pointed out that in pornography, women generally earn more than their male counterparts. Some porn performers such as Nina Hartley are active in the sex workers' rights movement.

The Swedish director and feminist Suzanne Osten voiced scepticism that "feminist pornography" actually exists, referring to her belief that pornography is inherently objectifying and that feminist pornography would therefore constitute an oxymoron. The American radical feminist periodical off our backs has denounced feminist pornography as "pseudo-feminist" and "so-called 'feminist' pornography".

=== Feminism and prostitution ===
As with many issues within the feminist movement, there exists a diversity of opinions regarding prostitution. Many of these positions can be loosely arranged into an overarching standpoint that is generally either critical or supportive of prostitution and sex work. Anti-prostitution feminists hold that prostitution is a form of exploitation of women and male dominance over women, and a practice which is the result of the existing patriarchal societal order. These feminists argue that prostitution has a very negative effect, both on the prostitutes themselves and on society as a whole, as it reinforces stereotypical views about women, who are seen as sex objects which can be used and abused by men. Other feminists hold that prostitution and other forms of sex work can be valid choices for women and men who choose to engage in it. In this view, prostitution must be differentiated from forced prostitution, and feminists should support sex worker activism against abuses by both the sex industry and the legal system. The disagreement between these two feminist stances has proven particularly contentious, and may be comparable to the feminist sex wars of the late twentieth century.

==== Anti-prostitution feminism ====
A proportion of feminists are strongly opposed to prostitution, as they see the practice as a form of violence against women, which should not be tolerated by society. Feminists who hold such views on prostitution include Kathleen Barry, Melissa Farley, Julie Bindel, Sheila Jeffreys, Catharine MacKinnon and Laura Lederer.

These feminists argue that, in most cases, prostitution is not a conscious and calculated choice. They say that most women who become prostitutes do so because they were forced or coerced by a pimp or by human trafficking, or, when it is an independent decision, it is generally the result of extreme poverty and lack of opportunity, or of serious underlying problems, such as drug addiction, past trauma (such as child sexual abuse) and other unfortunate circumstances. These feminists point out that women from the lowest socioeconomic classes—impoverished women, women with a low level of education, women from the most disadvantaged racial and ethnic minorities—are overrepresented in prostitution all over the world. "If prostitution is a free choice, why are the women with the fewest choices the ones most often found doing it?" (MacKinnon, 1993). A large percentage of prostitutes polled in one study of 475 people involved in prostitution reported that they were in a difficult period of their lives and most wanted to leave the occupation. Catharine MacKinnon argues that "In prostitution, women have sex with men they would never otherwise have sex with. The money thus acts as a form of force, not as a measure of consent. It acts like physical force does in rape."

Some anti-prostitution scholars hold that true consent in prostitution is not possible. Barbara Sullivan says, "In the academic literature on prostitution there are very few authors who argue that valid consent to prostitution is possible. Most suggest that consent to prostitution is impossible or at least unlikely.". "(...) most authors suggest that consent to prostitution is deeply problematic if not impossible (...) most authors have argued that consent to prostitution is impossible. For radical feminists this is because prostitution is always a coercive sexual practice. Others simply suggest that economic coercion makes the sexual consent of sex workers highly problematic if not impossible...". Finally, abolitionists believe no person can be said to truly consent to their own oppression and no people should have the right to consent to the oppression of others. In the words of Kathleen Barry, consent is not a "good divining rod as to the existence of oppression, and consent to violation is a fact of oppression. Oppression cannot effectively be gauged according to the degree of "consent," since even in slavery there was some consent, if consent is defined as inability to see, or feel any alternative."

==== Pro-sex work and pro-sex worker's rights feminists ====
Unlike those feminists critical of prostitution, pro-sex work perspectives do not concede that prostitution sexual acts have an inherent element of coercion, exploitation, and domination. As such, pro-sex feminists instead assert that sex-work can be a positive experience for women who have employed their autonomy to make an informed decision to engage in prostitution.

Many feminists, particularly those associated with the sex workers' rights movement or sex-positive feminism, argue that the act of selling sex need not inherently be exploitative; but that attempts to abolish prostitution, and the attitudes that lead to such attempts, lead to an abusive climate for sex workers that must be changed. In this view, prostitution, along with other forms of sex work, can be valid choices for the women and men who engage in it. This perspective has led to the rise since the 1970s of an international sex workers' rights movement, comprising organizations such as COYOTE, the International Prostitutes Collective, the Sex Workers Outreach Project, and other sex worker rights groups.

An important argument advanced by pro-sex work feminists such as Carol Queen highlights that all too often feminists who are critical of prostitution have failed to adequately consider the viewpoints of women who are themselves engaged in sex work, choosing instead to base their arguments in theory and outdated experiences. Feminists who do not support the radical anti-prostitution view, argue that there are serious problems with the anti-prostitution position, one of which is that, according to Sarah Bromberg, "it evolves from a political theory that is over-verbalized, generalized, and too often uses stereotypical notions of what a prostitute is. The radical [anti-prostitution] feminist views are ... not always delineated sufficiently to support a credible theory that prostitution degrades all women".

Pro-sex work feminists say that the sex industry is not a "monolith", that it is large and varied, that people are sex workers for many different reasons, and that it is unproductive to target prostitution as an institution. Instead, they believe things should be done to improve the lives of the people within the industry.

=== Feminism and stripping ===
Many feminists consider strip clubs to be insulting to women's human rights and dignity. Feminists and women's rights activists in Iceland succeeded in outlawing strip clubs in March 2010. The law officially took effect on July 31, 2010. The Icelandic feminist Siv Friðleifsdóttir was the first presenter of the bill. Jóhanna Sigurðardóttir, Iceland's prime minister, said: "The Nordic countries are leading the way on women's equality, recognizing women as equal citizens rather than commodities for sale." The politician behind the bill, Kolbrún Halldórsdóttir, said: "It is not acceptable that women or people in general are a product to be sold." The vote of the Althing was praised by British radical feminist Julie Bindel, who declared Iceland to be "the world's most feminist country."

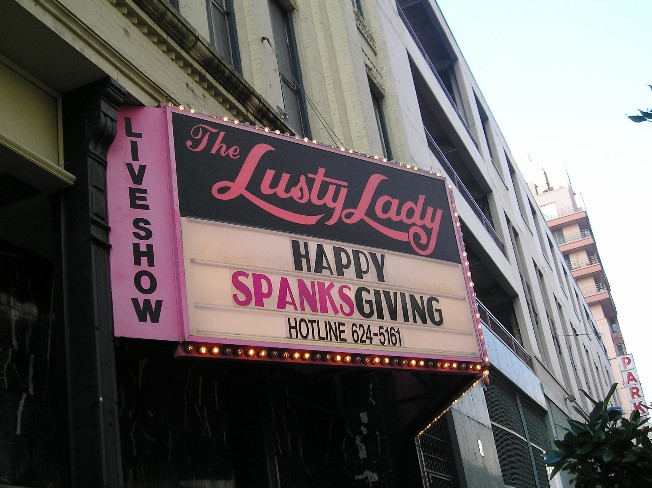
Marquee of the now defunct Seattle Lusty Lady, Thanksgiving 2005

Others feminists believe that stripping can be sexually empowering and feminist. The Lusty Lady was a peep show establishment in North Beach, San Francisco, that was established by a group of strippers who wanted to create a feminist, worker owned strip club. Additionally, some feminists believe that Pole dancing can be a feminist act. In 2009, a self-identified "feminist pole dancer" named Zahra Stardust was the Australian Sex Party's candidate in the Bradfield by-election. The concept of "feminist pole dancing" has been ridiculed and denounced by feminists and non-feminists alike as "just plain daft" and symptomatic of "the end of feminism."

== Feminism and BDSM ==
Feminist Views on BDSM vary widely from rejection to acceptance and all points in between. As an example, the two polarizing frameworks are being compared here. The history between feminists and BDSM practitioners has been controversial. The two most extreme positions are those who believe that feminism and BDSM are mutually exclusive beliefs, and those who believe that BDSM practices are an expression of sexual freedom.

=== Feminist opposition to BDSM and sadomasochism ===
A number of radical feminists, such as Andrea Dworkin and Susan Griffin, regard BDSM as a form of woman-hating violence,

The book Against Sadomasochism: A Radical Feminist Analysis includes essays and interviews from numerous feminists who criticize sadomasochism, including Alice Walker, Robin Morgan, Kathleen Barry, Diana E. H. Russell, Susan Star, Ti-Grace Atkinson, John Stoltenberg, Sarah Hoagland, Susan Griffin, Cerridwen Fallingstar, Audre Lorde, and Judith Butler. Feminist organizations that publicly opposed S/M/ include Lavender Menace, the New York Radical Feminists (NYRF), Women Against Violence in Pornography and Media. In 1982, a leaflet was produced by the "Coalition for a Feminist Sexuality and Against Sadomasochism", an ad-hoc coalition put together by Women Against Pornography to protest the Barnard Conference. The NYRF's NYRF was listed among the signatories to the leaflet.

=== Pro-BDSM and BDSM-practicing feminists ===
While many radical feminists are opposed to BDSM, other feminists view S/M as an ideal feminist expression of sexual freedom while other feminists say that BDSM, and more particularly SM, reinforce patriarchy and that these practices are contradictory to feminism. Additionally, some feminists are open about practicing BDSM. Many sex-positive feminists see BDSM as a valid form of expression of female sexuality. Some lesbian feminists practice BDSM and regard it as part of their sexual identity. Jessica Wakeman wrote of her own experience with SM activities in a follow-up interview after her article First Time For Everything: Getting Spanked was published in 2009. At the time of the interview in October, 2010, Wakeman had been writing about feminist issues, including feminism and media criticism, feminism and politics, and feminism and sex for about eight years and considered herself to be a rather active feminist. Wakeman discussed how she is able to enjoy spanking play and being dominated and still be a feminist. Like other feminist BDSM practitioners, Wakeman rejects the argument that women are taught what they enjoy and led to be submissive by a dominant sexist power structure.

There are several BDSM organizations that cater to lesbian and feminist women, including the Lesbian Sex Mafia and the group Samois that was founded by Patrick Califia and Gayle Rubin.

== Feminism and celibacy ==
The feminist group Cell 16, founded in 1968 by Roxanne Dunbar, was known for its program of celibacy and separation from men, among other things. Considered too extreme by many mainstream feminists, the organization acted as a sort of hard left vanguard. It has been cited as the first organization to advance the concept of separatist feminism. In No More Fun and Games, the organization's radical feminist periodical, Cell Members Roxanne Dunbar and Lisa Leghorn advised women to "separate from men who are not consciously working for female liberation", but advised periods of celibacy, rather than lesbian relationships, which they considered to be "nothing more than a personal solution." The periodical also published Dana Densmore's article "On Celibacy" (October 1968), which stated in part, "One hangup to liberation is a supposed 'need' for sex. It is something that must be refuted, coped with, demythified, or the cause of female liberation is doomed. Already we see girls, thoroughly liberated in their own heads, understanding their oppression with terrible clarity trying, deliberately and a trace hysterically, to make themselves attractive to men, men for whom they have no respect, men they may even hate, because of 'a basic sexual-emotional need.' Sex is not essential to life, as eating is. Some people go through their whole lives without engaging in it at all, including fine, warm, happy people. It is a myth that this makes one bitter, shriveled up, twisted. The big stigma of life-long virginity is on women anyway, created by men because woman's purpose in life is biological and if she doesn't fulfill that she's warped and unnatural and 'must be all cobwebs inside.'"

The Feminists, also known as Feminists—A Political Organization to Annihilate Sex Roles, was a radical feminist group active in New York City from 1968 to 1973; it at first advocated that women practice celibacy, and later came to advocate political lesbianism. Political lesbianism embraces the theory that sexual orientation is a choice, and advocates lesbianism as a positive alternative to heterosexuality for women. Sheila Jeffreys helped develop the concept by co-writing with other members of the Leeds Revolutionary Feminist Group a pamphlet titled Love Your Enemy?: The Debate Between Heterosexual Feminism and Political Lesbianism, which stated, "We do think... that all feminists can and should be lesbians. Our definition of a political lesbian is a woman-identified woman who does not fuck men. It does not mean compulsory sexual activity with women." Thus, some political lesbians chose to be celibate or identified as asexual.

In April 1987 the manifesto of the Southern Women's Writing Collective, titled Sex resistance in heterosexual arrangements: Manifesto of the Southern Women's Writing Collective was read in New York City at a conference called "The Sexual Liberals and the Attack on Feminism". This manifesto stated in part, "In contrast to the pro-sex movement, we are calling ourselves Women Against Sex (WAS)...The sex resister understands her act as a political one: her goal is not only personal integrity for herself but political freedom for all women. She resists on three fronts: she resists all male-constructed sexual needs, she resists the misnaming of her act as prudery and she especially resists the patriarchy's attempt to make its work of subordinating women easier by consensually constructing her desire in its own oppressive image."

In 1991 feminist activist Sonia Johnson wrote in her book The Ship That Sailed into the Living Room: Sex and Intimacy Reconsidered, "Nearly four years after I began my rebellion against relation/sex/slave Ships, experience and my Wise Old Woman are telling me that sex as we know it is a patriarchal construct and has no rightful, natural place in our lives, no authentic function or ways. Synonymous with hierarchy/control, sex is engineered as part of the siege against our wholeness and power."

== Feminism and sexual orientation ==
Feminist approaches to the issue of sexual orientation widely vary. Feminist views on sexual orientation are often influenced by the personal experiences of feminists, as expressed in the feminist slogan "the personal is political." Because of this, many feminists view sexual orientation is a political issue and not merely a matter of individual sexual choice or preference.

=== Feminism and asexuality ===
A 1977 paper titled Asexual and Autoerotic Women: Two Invisible Groups, by Myra T. Johnson, may be the first paper explicitly devoted to asexuality in humans. In it Johnson portrays asexual women as invisible, "oppressed by a consensus that they are nonexistent," and left behind by both the sexual revolution and the feminist movement.

A 2010 paper written by Karli June Cerankowski and Megan Milks, titled New Orientations: Asexuality and Its Implications for Theory and Practice, states that society has deemed "[LGBT and] female sexuality as empowered or repressed. The asexual movement challenges that assumption by challenging many of the basic tenets of pro-sex feminism [in which it is] already defined as repressive or anti-sex sexualities."

Some political lesbians identify as asexual. Political lesbianism embraces the theory that sexual orientation is a choice, and advocates lesbianism as a positive alternative to heterosexuality for women. Sheila Jeffreys helped develop the concept by co-writing with other members of the Leeds Revolutionary Feminist Group a pamphlet titled Love Your Enemy?: The Debate Between Heterosexual Feminism and Political Lesbianism which stated, "We do think... that all feminists can and should be lesbians. Our definition of a political lesbian is a woman-identified woman who does not fuck men. It does not mean compulsory sexual activity with women."

=== Feminism and bisexuality ===
The lesbian quarterly Common Lives/Lesbian Lives had a policy that all work published in CL/LL was produced by self-defined lesbians, and all of the project's volunteers were lesbians. Due to this policy, a complaint was filed with the University of Iowa Human Rights Commission by a bisexual woman whose submission to the magazine was not published.

A number of women who were at one time involved in lesbian-feminist activism have since come out as bisexual after realizing their attractions to men. A widely studied example of lesbian-bisexual conflict within feminism was the Northampton Pride March during the years between 1989 and 1993, where many feminists involved debated over whether bisexuals should be included and whether or not bisexuality was compatible with feminism. Common lesbian-feminist critiques leveled at bisexuality were that bisexuality was anti-feminist, that bisexuality was a form of false consciousness, and that bisexual women who pursue relationships with men were "deluded and desperate." However, tensions between bisexual feminists and lesbian feminists have eased since the 1990s, as bisexual women have become more accepted within the feminist community.

=== Feminism and gay men ===
In her 2003 book Unpacking Queer Politics: A Lesbian Feminist Perspective, Australian radical lesbian feminist Sheila Jeffreys advances the position that lesbian culture has been negatively affected by emulating the sexist influence of the gay male subculture of dominant/submissive sexuality. While she stresses that many gay men who were members of the gay liberation movement repudiated sadomasochism, she writes that the dominant gay male perspective has promoted sadomasochistic sexuality to the detriment of lesbians and feminist women.

However, some gay men such as Andrea Dworkin's husband John Stoltenberg are also critical of sadomasochism and pornography and agree with the radical feminist and lesbian feminist criticisms of these practices. Stoltenberg wrote that sadomasochism eroticizes both violence and powerlessness. The gay pro-feminist author Christopher N. Kendall wrote the book Gay Male Pornography: An Issue Of Sex Discrimination, advancing the idea that gay male pornography involved sex discrimination and should be banned under Canada's equality laws. He uses radical feminist theory to make the case that gay male pornography reinforces misogyny and homophobia.

=== Feminism and heterosexuality ===
Some heterosexual feminists believe that they have been unfairly excluded from lesbian feminist organizations. The lesbian quarterly Common Lives/Lesbian Lives had a policy that all work published in CL/LL was produced by self-defined lesbians, and all of the project's volunteers were lesbians. Due to this policy, a complaint was filed with the University of Iowa Human Rights Commission by a heterosexual woman who believed she was discriminated against when not hired to be an intern.

=== Feminism and lesbianism ===
The Labrys, a lesbian-feminist symbol.

Lesbians have been active in the mainstream American feminist movement. The first time lesbian concerns were introduced into the National Organization for Women (NOW) came in 1969, when Ivy Bottini, an open lesbian who was then president of the New York chapter of NOW, held a public forum titled "Is Lesbianism a Feminist Issue?". However, National Organization for Women president Betty Friedan was against lesbian participation in the movement. In 1969 she referred to growing lesbian visibility as a "lavender menace" and fired openly lesbian newsletter editor Rita Mae Brown, and in 1970 she engineered the expulsion of lesbians, including Ivy Bottini, from NOW's New York chapter. In reaction, at the 1970 Congress to Unite Women, on the first evening when all four hundred feminists were assembled in the auditorium, twenty women wearing T-shirts that read "Lavender Menace" came to the front of the room and faced the audience. One of the women then read their group's paper "The Woman-Identified Woman", which was the first major lesbian feminist statement. The group, who later named themselves "Radicalesbians", were among the first to challenge the heterosexism of heterosexual feminists and to describe lesbian experience in positive terms. In 1971 NOW passed a resolution declaring "that a woman's right to her own person includes the right to define and express her own sexuality and to choose her own lifestyle," as well as a conference resolution stating that forcing lesbian mothers to stay in marriages or to live a secret existence in an effort to keep their children was unjust. That year NOW also committed to offering legal and moral support in a test case involving child custody rights of lesbian mothers. In 1973 the NOW Task Force on Sexuality and Lesbianism was established. In November 1977 the National Women's Conference issued the National Plan of Action, which stated in part, "Congress, State, and local legislatures should enact legislation to eliminate discrimination on the basis of sexual and affectional preference in areas including, but not limited to, employment, housing, public accommodations, credit, public facilities, government funding, and the military. State legislatures should reform their penal codes or repeal State laws that restrict private sexual behavior between consenting adults. State legislatures should enact legislation that would prohibit consideration of sexual or affectional orientation as a factor in any judicial determination of child custody or visitation rights. Rather, child custody cases should be evaluated solely on the merits of which party is the better parent, without regard to that person's sexual and affectional orientation."

Del Martin was the first open lesbian elected to NOW, and Del Martin and Phyllis Lyon were the first lesbian couple to join NOW.

Lesbian feminism is a cultural movement and political perspective, most influential in the 1970s and early 1980s (primarily in North America and Western Europe), that encourages women to direct their energies toward other women rather than men, and often advocates lesbianism as the logical result of feminism. Some key thinkers and activists are Charlotte Bunch, Rita Mae Brown, Adrienne Rich, Audre Lorde, Marilyn Frye, Mary Daly, Sheila Jeffreys and Monique Wittig (although the latter is more commonly associated with the emergence of queer theory). Lesbian feminism came together in the early 1970s out of dissatisfaction with second-wave feminism and the gay liberation movement.

In the words of radical lesbian feminist Sheila Jeffreys, "Lesbian feminism emerged as a result of two developments: lesbians within the WLM [Women's Liberation Movement] began to create a new, distinctively feminist lesbian politics, and lesbians in the GLF (Gay Liberation Front) left to join up with their sisters".

According to Judy Rebick, a leading Canadian journalist and political activist for feminism, lesbians were and always have been at the heart of the women's movement, while their issues were invisible in the same movement.

==== Lesbian separatism ====
Lesbian separatism is a form of separatist feminism specific to lesbians. Separatism has been considered by lesbians as both a temporary strategy, and as a lifelong practice.

Lesbian separatism became popular in the 1970s as some lesbians doubted whether mainstream society or even the LGBT movement had anything to offer them.

==== Political lesbianism ====
Political lesbianism is a phenomenon within lesbian feminism and radical feminism, primarily second-wave feminism. Political lesbianism embraces the theory that sexual orientation is a choice, and advocates lesbianism as a positive alternative to heterosexuality for women.

Lesbian women who have identified themselves as "political lesbians" include Ti-Grace Atkinson, Julie Bindel, Charlotte Bunch, Yvonne Rainer, Sheila Jeffreys. Jeffreys helped develop the concept by co-writing with other members of the Leeds Revolutionary Feminist Group a pamphlet titled Love Your Enemy?: The Debate Between Heterosexual Feminism and Political Lesbianism which argued that women should abandon heterosexuality and choose to become lesbians as a feminist act. The pamphlet stated, "We do think... that all feminists can and should be lesbians. Our definition of a political lesbian is a woman-identified woman who does not fuck men. It does not mean compulsory sexual activity with women." Thus, some political lesbians choose to be celibate or identify as asexual.

=== Biphobia and homophobia in feminism ===
Common lesbian-feminist critiques leveled at bisexuality were that bisexuality was anti-feminist, that bisexuality was a form of false consciousness, and that bisexual women who pursue relationships with men were "deluded and desperate." However, tensions between bisexual feminists and lesbian feminists have eased since the 1990s, as bisexual women have become more accepted within the feminist community. Nevertheless, some lesbian feminists such as Julie Bindel are still critical of bisexuality. Bindel has described female bisexuality as a "fashionable trend" being promoted due to "sexual hedonism" and broached the question of whether bisexuality even exists. She has also made tongue-in-cheek comparisons of bisexuals to cat fanciers and devil worshippers.

Lesbian feminists initially faced discrimination in the National Organization for Women. Some heterosexual feminists such as Betty Friedan downplayed lesbian issues as not being central to feminist activism. In 1969 Friedan referred to growing lesbian visibility as a "lavender menace" and fired openly lesbian newsletter editor Rita Mae Brown, and in 1970 she engineered the expulsion of lesbians, including Ivy Bottini, from NOW's New York chapter. In reaction, at the 1970 Congress to Unite Women, on the first evening when all four hundred feminists were assembled in the auditorium, twenty women wearing T-shirts that read "Lavender Menace" came to the front of the room and faced the audience. One of the women then read their group's paper "The Woman-Identified Woman", which was the first major lesbian feminist statement. The group, who later named themselves "Radicalesbians", were among the first to challenge the heterosexism of heterosexual feminists and to describe lesbian experience in positive terms. In 1971 NOW passed a resolution declaring "that a woman's right to her own person includes the right to define and express her own sexuality and to choose her own lifestyle," as well as a conference resolution stating that forcing lesbian mothers to stay in marriages or to live a secret existence in an effort to keep their children was unjust. That year NOW also committed to offering legal and moral support in a test case involving child custody rights of lesbian mothers. In 1973 the NOW Task Force on Sexuality and Lesbianism was established. In November 1977 the National Women's Conference issued the National Plan of Action, which stated in part, "Congress, State, and local legislatures should enact legislation to eliminate discrimination on the basis of sexual and affectional preference in areas including, but not limited to, employment, housing, public accommodations, credit, public facilities, government funding, and the military. State legislatures should reform their penal codes or repeal State laws that restrict private sexual behavior between consenting adults. State legislatures should enact legislation that would prohibit consideration of sexual or affectional orientation as a factor in any judicial determination of child custody or visitation rights. Rather, child custody cases should be evaluated solely on the merits of which party is the better parent, without regard to that person's sexual and affectional orientation."

Friedan eventually admitted that "the whole idea of homosexuality made me profoundly uneasy" and acknowledged that she had been very square and was uncomfortable about lesbianism. "The women's movement was not about sex, but about equal opportunity in jobs and all the rest of it. Yes, I suppose you have to say that freedom of sexual choice is part of that, but it shouldn't be the main issue ...." She ignored lesbians in the National Organization for Women initially and objected to what she saw as demands for equal time. "'Homosexuality ... is not, in my opinion, what the women's movement is all about.'" While opposing all repression, she wrote, she refused to wear a purple armband or self-identify as a lesbian (although heterosexual) as an act of political solidarity, considering it not part of the mainstream issues of abortion and child care. In 1977, at the National Women's Conference, she seconded the lesbian rights resolution "which everyone thought I would oppose" in order to "preempt any debate" and move on to other issues she believed were more important and less divisive in the effort to add the Equal Rights Amendment (ERA) to the U.S. Constitution.

The American radical feminist group Redstockings were strongly opposed to lesbian separatism, seeing interpersonal relationships with men as an important arena of feminist struggle, and hence seeing separatism as escapist. Like many radical feminists of the time, Redstockings saw lesbianism primarily as a political identity rather than a fundamental part of personal identity, and therefore analyzed it primarily in political terms. Redstockings were also opposed to male homosexuality, which they saw as a deeply misogynistic rejection of women. Redstockings' line on gay men and lesbians is often criticized as homophobic.

=== Feminism and queer theory ===
Queer theory is a field of post-structuralist critical theory that emerged in the early 1990s out of the fields of queer studies and women's studies. Queer theory has been heavily influenced by the work of feminists such as Gloria Anzaldúa, Eve Kosofsky Sedgwick, and Judith Butler. Queer theory builds both upon feminist challenges to the idea that gender is part of the essential self and upon gay/lesbian studies' close examination of the socially constructed nature of sexual acts and identities. The theory is heavily based on the idea of de-naturalization of identities, which means to reject the very notion of identity, whether this be man and woman or straight and gay. It argues that these identities are constructed throughout life through gendered socialization, this leads to Butler's idea that what makes a man or a woman is malleable and changes throughout time, we are merely performing as a man or woman to conform to today's gender norms.

==== Feminist application of queer theory ====
Queer theory has been greatly influenced by feminist theory and women's studies. Many works have been written on the intersection of feminism and queer theory and how both feminist perspectives can enrich LGBTQ theory and studies and how queer perspectives can enrich feminism. Books such as Feminism is Queer: The Intimate Connection Between Queer and Feminist Theory detail the intersections between queer and feminist theory and argue that feminism itself could be construed as a "queer" movement.

==== Feminist criticism of queer theory ====
Some feminists have critiqued queer theory as either anti-feminist or a distraction from feminist issues. For example, anti-trans feminist Sheila Jeffreys' Unpacking Queer Politics: A Lesbian Feminist Perspective (2003) criticizes queer theory as the product of "a powerful gay male culture" which "celebrated masculine privilege" and "enshrined a cult of masculinity." Since queer theory challenges the notion of inherent dichotomies of male and female traits or identities, some feminists argue that there are traits that are natural to the sexes, like that of male domination. Furthermore, queer theorists like Judith Butler argue that sex, like gender, is also a complex social construct, and that treating gender as constructed but sex as natural is a basis for patriarchal oppression. While many feminists do agree that sex and gender are different and that gender is socially constructed, second-wave and anti-trans feminists in particular also believe sex is not a social construct and is instead inherent or natural, and therefore criticize Butler for this idea. Martha Nussbaum criticized Butler in 1999 by saying that even though she is "right to insist that, to a large extent, claims of bodily sex difference allegedly based upon scientific research have been projections of cultural prejudice", her philosophy was too abstract and nonspecific, and that "culture can shape and reshape some aspects of our bodily existence, but it does not shape all the aspects of it".

== Feminist sexology ==
Feminist sexology is an offshoot of traditional studies of sexology that focuses on the intersectionality of sex and gender in relation to the sexual lives of women. Feminist sexology shares many principles with the overarching field of sexology; in particular, it does not try to prescribe a certain path or "normality" for women's sexuality, but only observe and note the different and varied ways in which women express their sexuality. It is a young field, but one that is growing rapidly. Notable feminist sexologists include Anne Fausto-Sterling and Gayle Rubin.

A notable radical feminist work on women's sexuality is Anne Koedt's The Myth of the Vaginal Orgasm, which advances the claim that vaginal orgasm is a patriarchal myth.

== Feminism and sexual violence ==
Rape culture is a culture in which rape and sexual violence are common and in which prevalent attitudes, norms, practices, and media normalize, excuse, tolerate, or even condone sexual violence. Examples of behaviors commonly associated with rape culture include victim blaming, slut-shaming, sexual objectification, and trivializing rape. Rape culture has been used to model behaviour within social groups, including prison systems where prison rape is common and conflict areas where war rape is used as psychological warfare. Entire countries have also been alleged to be rape cultures.

Although the concept of rape culture is a generally accepted theory in feminist academia, disagreement still exists over what defines a rape culture and to what degree a given society meets the criteria to be considered a rape culture.

Rape culture has been observed to correlate with other social factors and behaviours. Research identifies correlation between rape myths, victim blaming and trivialisation of rape with increased incidence of racism, homophobia, ageism, classism, religious intolerance and other forms of discrimination.

== Feminism and sexual harassment ==
Feminists have been crucial to the development of the notion of sexual harassment and the codification of laws against sexual harassment. Catharine MacKinnon was among the first to write on the topic of sexual harassment. MacKinnon's book Sexual Harassment of Working Women: A Case of Sex Discrimination is the eighth most-cited American legal book published since 1978, according to a study published by Fred Shapiro in January 2000.

Some liberal feminists and individualist feminists have criticized the notion of sexual harassment. Camille Paglia says that young girls can end up acting in such ways as to make sexual harassment easier, such that for example, by acting "nice" they can become a target. Paglia commented in an interview with Playboy, "Realize the degree to which your niceness may invoke people to say lewd and pornographic things to you—sometimes to violate your niceness. The more you blush, the more people want to do it." Jane Gallop believes that sexual harassment laws have been abused by what she calls "victim feminists", as opposed to "power feminists" as she calls herself.

== Feminism and sexual objectification ==
The concept of sexual objectification and, in particular, the objectification of women, is an important idea in feminist theory and psychological theories derived from feminism. Many feminists regard sexual objectification as objectionable and as playing an important role in gender inequality. Some social commentators, however, argue that some modern women objectify themselves as an expression of their empowerment over men, while others argue that increased sexual freedom for women, gay, and bisexual men has led to an increase of the objectification of men.

=== The male gaze ===
The "male gaze" is feminist theory that was first developed by Laura Mulvey in 1975. The male gaze occurs when the audience, or viewer, is put into the perspective of a heterosexual male. Mulvey stressed that the dominant male gaze in mainstream Hollywood films reflects and satisfies the male unconscious: most filmmakers are male, thus the voyeuristic gaze of the camera is male; male characters in the film's narratives make women the objects of their gaze; and inevitably, the spectator's gaze reflects the voyeuristic male gazes of the camera and the male actors. When feminism characterizes the "male gaze" certain themes appear such as, voyeurism, objectification, fetishism, scopophilia, and women as the object of male pleasure. Mary Anne Doane gives an example of how voyeurism can be seen in the male gaze. "The early silent cinema, through its insistent inscription of scenarios of voyeurism, conceives of its spectator's viewing pleasure in terms of the peeping tom, behind the screen, reduplicating the spectator's position in relation to the woman on the screen."

== See also ==
- Feminism
- Feminist pornography
- Feminist sexology
- Feminist Sex Wars
- Feminist theory
- Feminist views on BDSM
- Feminist views on pornography
- Feminist views on prostitution
- Feminist Perspectives on Sex Markets
- Gender roles in non-heterosexual communities § Feminism
- Labia pride
- LGBT ideology
