= Antisexualism =

Hostility towards sexuality

Antisexualism is opposition or hostility towards sexual behavior and sexuality.

== Terminology ==
Other terms whose meanings overlap or are synonymous or interchangeable with antisexualism include sex-negativism, sex-negative movement, sex-negativity, antisexuality, demonization of sex or as an adjective, anti-sex or sex-negative. In a broader scope, it may refer to a general opposition to sexuality, especially tending to reduce or eliminate the sex drive or sexual activity or a force in society that suppresses sexual freedom and disseminates antisexual opinions. When such an aversion involves hatred, it is sometimes called miserotia or miserotism.

== History ==
=== Religious ===
Some forms of early ascetic Gnosticism held all matter to be evil, and that unnecessary gratifications of the physical senses were to be avoided. Married couples were encouraged to be chaste. In the first century, Marcion of Sinope held an antisexual and ascetic outlook. The Skoptsys were a radical sect of the Russian Orthodox Church that practiced castration and amputation of sexual organs. The Skoptsy believed that Christ had been castrated during his crucifixion, and it was this castration that brought about salvation. Boston Corbett, who was involved in killing John Wilkes Booth, castrated himself after being mocked and tempted by prostitutes. Ann Lee was the founder of the Shakers, a radical Protestant sect that opposed procreation and all sexual activity. The Shakers were more opposed to pregnancy than anything else. Father Divine, founder of the International Peace Mission Movement, advocated religious abstinence from sex and marriage and taught that sexual objectification is a root cause of undesirable social and political conditions.

James Baldwin in The Fire Next Time refers to the United States as an antisexual country dominated by a white culture that regards sensual or soulful behavior by Black Americans as suspect. This contributed to a crisis of Baldwin's Christian faith, showing that the world did not accept him, and that Christianity had not made white people accepting.

=== Non-religious ===
Philosopher Immanuel Kant viewed humans as being subject to the animalistic desires of self-preservation, species-preservation, and the preservation of enjoyment. He argued that humans have a duty to avoid actions that harm or degrade themselves, including suicide, sexual degradation, and drunkenness. This led Kant to regard sexual intercourse as degrading because it "makes of the loved person an Object of appetite", rather than focusing on their inherent worth as rational beings, which violates Kant's second formulation of the categorical imperative, a philosophical concept he created to judge the morality of actions. He admitted sex only within marriage, which he regarded as "a merely animal union".

=== Feminist ===
Various feminist views on sexuality have been described as anti-sex or sex-negative. In particular, second-wave and radical feminist viewpoints and thinkers have been subject to this, including from other feminists.

Prior to the second wave of feminism, which introduced such slogans as "The personal is political" in the 1960s, the subject of women's sexuality had rarely been addressed as a politicized subject, although the subjugation of women by aspects of male sexuality had been discussed. Major feminist organizations, such as the National Organization for Women (NOW) in the United States, primarily focused on male supremacy in the public sphere. It was not until the earliest radical feminist groups began to form in the late 1960s that feminist analysis of women's sexuality started to become widespread.

According to radical feminist theory, sexuality is the primary sphere of patriarchy, with sexual activity, especially heterosexual sex, as the basis of women's oppression by men. Sexuality, according to radical feminists, only serves to revoke the agency of women. Radical feminists oppose the sexual objectification of women, for their sexual and reproductive labor, and hold the view that in a male-dominated society heterosexual practices involve an imbalance of power and serve to sexualize the oppression of women. Ti-Grace Atkinson wrote of heterosexual sex as a social institution serving the needs of men but not necessarily of women. This analysis led some radical feminists to call for women to stop having sex with men altogether, with some advocating for celibacy and others advocating political lesbianism. This led to the second wave polarizing around two camps in what would become known as the feminist sex wars.

Radical feminist writer Julie Bindel described female bisexuality as a "fashionable trend" pushing for sexual hedonism. She writes, "if bisexual women had an ounce of sexual politics, they would stop sleeping with men."

Several authors have objected to radical feminists on this front. Margaret Hunt criticized Sheila Jeffreys for praising women involved in the 19th-century social purity movement, whose "concern with women's victimization" Jeffreys admired.

Naomi Wolf identified a form of feminism she called victim feminism, which she described as "sexually judgmental, even antisexual".

== Criticism ==
Antisexualism drew sharp criticism from Bertrand Russell in his Marriage and Morals:

Westermarck gives many instances of what he calls 'the curious notion that there is something impure and sinful in ... sexual relations.' ... It should be said to begin with that it is useless to look to beliefs as the source of this kind of attitude. Beliefs of this sort must be in the first place inspired by a mood; it is true that when once they exist they may perpetuate the mood, or at any rate actions in accordance with the mood, but it is hardly likely that they will be the prime causes of an anti-sexual attitude. The two main causes of such an attitude are, I should say, jealousy and sexual fatigue.

— Bertrand Russell, Marriage and Morals

According to Bertrand Russell, an anti-sexual attitude must be regarded as purely superstitious and those who first inculcated antisexualism must have suffered from a diseased condition of body or mind, or both.

== Anaphrodisiacs ==
John Harvey Kellogg, the inventor of the corn flakes variety of breakfast cereal, was opposed to all forms of sexual activity, especially masturbation. The Road to Wellville satirized his life and practices. According to some sources, the early Christian theologian Origen castrated himself to avoid temptation and remain pure.

== Fictional ==
- The Junior Anti-Sex League, in George Orwell's dystopian novel Nineteen Eighty-Four, was a group of young adult Party members devoted to banning all sexual intercourse.
- The film Demolition Man takes place in a future in which sexual intercourse is banned – reproduction is achieved clinically and the experience itself is simulated through virtual reality. These attitudes resulted from STD outbreaks that caused widespread fear.
- The song "Samurai Abstinence Patrol" by comedy music duo Ninja Sex Party is about a group known as the Samurai Abstinence Patrol who ban all sex in the future.

== See also ==
- Absexual
- Antinatalism – Value judgment that procreation is unethical
- Apothisexuality
- Cathar Perfect – Religious leaders of the Cathar movement
- Erotophobia – Fear of, or negative attitudes about, sex
- Misanthropy – General dislike of humanity
- NoFap – Internet community forum
- Opposition to pornography – Overview of opposing views to pornography
- Purity culture – 1990s Christian movement
- Reproductive rights – Legal rights and freedoms relating to reproduction and reproductive health
- Right to sexuality – Concept in human rights
- Sexual abstinence – Act of refraining from sexual activity
- Sexual and reproductive health and rights – Concept in human rights
- Sexual frustration – Frustration resulting from lack of desired sexual activity
- Sexual repression – Psychological state
- Sexual revolution – 20th-century Western social movement
- Sex-positive – Ideology supporting healthy sexual norms
