= Feminist views on BDSM =

Acceptance or rejection of BDSM by feminists

Feminist views on BDSM vary widely from acceptance to rejection. BDSM refers to bondage and discipline, dominance and submission, and Sado-Masochism. In order to evaluate its perception, two polarizing frameworks are compared. Some feminists, such as Gayle Rubin and Patrick Califia, perceive BDSM as a valid form of expression of female sexuality, while other feminists, such as Andrea Dworkin and Susan Griffin, have stated that they regard BDSM as a form of woman-hating violence. Some lesbian feminists practice BDSM and regard it as part of their sexual identity.

The historical relationship between feminists and BDSM practitioners has been controversial. The two most extreme positions reflect those who believe that feminism and BDSM are mutually exclusive beliefs, and those who believe that BDSM practices are a fundamental expression of sexual freedom. Much of the controversy is left over from the feminist sex wars (acrimonious debates over sex issues) and the battle between the anti-pornography feminists and the sex-positive feminists.

== History ==
=== 1970s ===
In the 1970s, many different divisions of the feminist movement emerged. As Andrew McBride writes, "During the 1970s, much of the discourse in the feminist movement was dominated by discussions of lesbian feminism. Toward the end of the decade, however, the conversations within feminism began to focus on a new topic: sexuality. This included sexuality of all types, not just lesbian sexuality. Included in the discussions and debates were heterosexuality, pornography, sadomasochism, butch/femme roles, and sex work." The Lavender Menace and their concept of the woman identified woman and the Women Against Violence in Pornography and Media both came out strongly believing that engaging in BDSM play was contradictory to being a feminist. Samois, a San Francisco-based lesbian BDSM group, maintained that feminists could engage in BDSM without being hypocritical.

=== 1980s ===
During the 1980s, this sex war continued and reached the attention of several academics who attempted to dissect why such a division had occurred. Ardill and O'Sullivan explained the history using the conflict in the London Lesbian and Gay Center as an example. Similar conflicts were continuations of the issues in the 1970s. The Lesbian Sex Mafia founded by Dorothy Allison appeared in New York advocating sex positive feminism and promoting the idea that all women had the right to explore their sexuality in whatever ways they saw fit. The controversial 1982 Barnard Conference on Sexuality, which brought these issues to the attention of academic feminists, is often regarded as officially launching the feminist sex wars.

=== 1990s ===
In the 1990s feminist scholars continued to research and apply different feminist academic frameworks to the questions of sexuality and BDSM in an effort to find a way to bridge the gap between the two groups. Hopkins, in 1994 applied critical analysis to the feminist viewpoints against Sadomasochistic acts. She takes each argument put forth against BDSM practice by women and answers it from within a feminist framework. In the end, she points out that the issue is not as concrete as feminists may try and paint it and that they may need to examine the concepts in more detail. In 1995, Teresa Hornsby also applied feminist frameworks to the subject of BDSM and came down on the side that the two were not contradictory. Hornsby went further to examine whether or not violence itself was only a masculine activity.

=== 2000s ===
After 2000, advances in technology were opening up the world to more people and BDSM started coming out more and more in popular culture. Maneesha Deckha applied a postcolonial feminist approach where she suggests treating BDSM as a cultural practice as a means to put to rest the divide between feminists and BDSM practitioners. She came to the conclusion as did those in the 1990s that perhaps a more in depth look is needed to determine if feminist viewpoints on BDSM hold up under closer scrutiny. In addition, Deckha did some work on the concepts of consent and the legality of BDSM, specifically addressing the question on whether or not women can give consent and whether BDSM activities should be regulated in the context of violence or the context of sexuality. One point she makes is: if legislation is made in the context of regulating it around sex, then aren't we simply giving the patriarchy further control over women's expression of sexual identity?

=== Current feminist viewpoints ===
Current feminist viewpoints on BDSM practices continue to be controversial and at odds with one another. Some feminists view SM as an ideal feminist expression of sexual freedom while other feminists say that BDSM, and more particularly SM, reinforce patriarchy and that these practices are contradictory to feminism. Feminists who view BDSM as contradictory to feminism also often believe that women who engage in BDSM practices, and specifically those who play a submissive role in them, have been led by sexist power structures to believe that they enjoy these acts. This feminist viewpoint argues that the individuals who enjoy playing a submissive role in the bedroom only enjoy it because they have been led to believe that it is what is expected of them and that they should enjoy it. This viewpoint argues that if these individuals, particularly women, were able to explore their sexual desires without the influence of a sexist power structure that they would come to very different conclusions about what they enjoy.

=== Perspectives on lesbian BDSM ===
Lesbian SM (Sadism, Submission, Masochism) has been problematic in the analysis of feminist viewpoints on BDSM, especially with regards to whether or not lesbians are recreating patriarchal structures. Many academic critics do not even tackle the idea of lesbian BDSM. Maneesha Deckha in her article, "Pain, pleasure, and consenting women: Exploring feminist responses to S/M and its legal regulation in Canada through Jelinek's The Piano Teacher" admitted that covering lesbian BDSM made her theories too convoluted to see. Such lesbian erasure has been fairly common in second and third wave feminism as lesbian identity has frequently been subsumed in feminist identity. This concept is explained by Calhoun in "The Gender Closet: Lesbian disappearance under the sign 'woman'" Some, such as Deckha, believe that although lesbians do practice BDSM, they are doing so in an effort to merely recreate the patriarchal power structure in the rest of society. Be it through domination and submission exchange of power, or the butch/femme dynamic, lesbians who interact in this way are convincing themselves that they are outside of patriarchy, when in reality they are reinforcing it because their sexuality is trapped within the patriarchal structure, true consent cannot occur.

Others, such as Hornsby, believe that lesbians can in fact practice BDSM without recreating patriarchal systems because they have already declared themselves to be outside of those systems.

=== BDSM practitioners ===
Feminist writer Clarisse Thorn released a book in 2012 called The S&M Feminist, in which she often discusses her own experiences. The high-profile feminist anthology Yes Means Yes, published in 2008, also featured an essay about BDSM and feminism by Stacey May Fowles.

Jessica Wakeman wrote of her own experience with SM activities in a follow-up interview after her article First Time For Everything: Getting Spanked was published in 2009. At the time of the interview in October 2010, Wakeman had been writing about feminist issues, including feminism and media criticism, feminism and politics, and feminism and sex for about eight years and considered herself to be a rather active feminist.

Wakeman discussed how she is able to enjoy spanking play and being dominated and still be a feminist. She discussed how spanking play is a fetish and is no different from other fetishes that individuals have, even though it does involve being hit by one's partner. She also commented that it is important to remember that when an individual is involved with BDSM play, such as spanking, if it is true BDSM play it has been discussed by both partners and either of them can stop the play at any time with a safe word, phrase or action. Furthermore, a real physically or emotionally abusive relationship is not safe and consensual like BDSM play is. There is a difference between what happens in the bedroom and what happens in real life. Wakeman wrote that she is able to enjoy things in the context of sex or flirting that she would not want to happen in her day-to-day life.

Like other feminist BDSM practitioners, Wakeman rejects the argument that women are taught what they enjoy and led to be submissive by a dominant sexist power structure. Within BDSM communities, it is often said that submissive practitioners are the real dominants because they have the ultimate control over the situation with a safe word.

== Major figures ==
Some feminists practice BDSM and regard it as part of their sexual identity.

=== Patrick Califia ===
Patrick Califia perceives BDSM as a valid form of expression of female sexuality.

=== Andrea Dworkin ===
Andrea Dworkin has written on the topic and regards BDSM as a form of misogynist violence.

=== Susan Griffin ===
Like Dworkin, Susan Griffin is against BDSM.

=== Gayle Rubin ===
Gayle Rubin is an American cultural anthropologist best known as an activist and theorist of sex and gender politics. She has written on a range of subjects including feminism, sadomasochism, prostitution, pedophilia, pornography and lesbian literature, as well as anthropological studies and histories of sexual subcultures.

Rubin's 1984 essay "Thinking Sex" is widely regarded as a founding text of sexuality studies and queer theory. In 2009, the University of Pennsylvania hosted a "state of the field" conference in gender and sexuality studies entitled "Rethinking Sex" in recognition of the twenty-fifth anniversary of Rubin's essay. Rubin was a featured speaker at the conference, where she presented "Blood under the Bridge: Reflections on 'Thinking Sex'" to an audience of nearly eight hundred people. In 2011 GLQ: A Journal of Lesbian and Gay Studies published a special issue, also titled "Rethinking Sex", featuring work emerging from this conference, and including Rubin's piece "Blood under the Bridge: Reflections on 'Thinking Sex'".

In 1978 Rubin, together with Patrick Califia and others, founded the first lesbian BDSM group in the United States, Samois. Rubin became a prominent sex-positive feminist in the feminist sex wars of the late 1970s and 1980s.

== See also ==
- Feminist views on sexuality
- Feminist sex wars
- Lesbian Sex Mafia
- List of universities with BDSM clubs
- Samois
