= Feminist sex wars =

Dissenting views within the feminist movement regarding sexuality

The feminist sex wars, also known as the lesbian sex wars, sex wars, or porn wars, are collective debates amongst feminists regarding a number of issues broadly relating to sexuality and sexual activity. Differences of opinion on matters of sexuality deeply polarized the feminist movement. The debates took place between leading feminist thinkers of the late 1970s and early 1980s, and continue to influence debates amongst feminists to this day.

The sides were characterized by anti-porn feminist and sex-positive feminist groups with disagreements regarding sexuality, including pornography, erotica, prostitution, lesbian sexual practices, the role of transgender women in the lesbian community, sadomasochism and other sexual matters. The feminist movement was deeply divided as a result of these debates. Many historians view the feminist sex wars as having been the end of the second-wave feminist era (which began c. 1963) as well as the herald of the third wave (which began in the early 1990s).

== Two opposing views ==
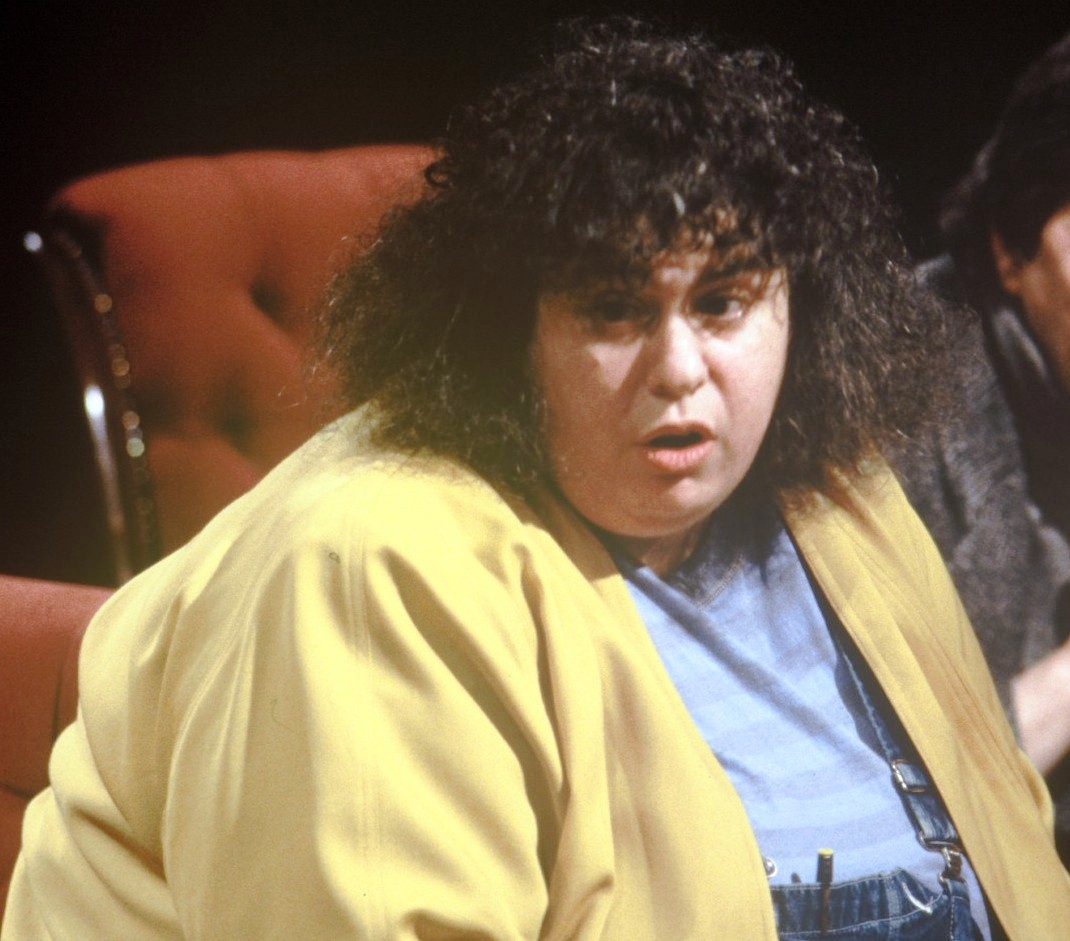
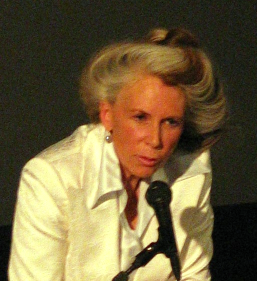
Ariel Levy described the Dworkin-MacKinnon Ordinance as "the single most divisive issue" of the feminist sex wars. Dworkin captured the spirit of the anti-pornography side of the debate in her famous utterance: "I'm a radical feminist, not the fun kind."

The two sides became labelled anti-pornography feminists and sex-positive feminists. The former believed that pornography objectified women, while the latter argued that sexuality was a physical exchange of pleasure that should not be censored or restricted.

=== Anti-pornography feminists ===
In 1976, Andrea Dworkin organized demonstrations against the film Snuff in New York, but attempts to start an organization to continue the feminist anti-pornography campaign failed. Efforts were more successful in Los Angeles, where Women Against Violence Against Women was founded in response to Snuff in 1976; they campaigned against the Rolling Stones' 1976 album Black and Blue. The U.S. anti-pornography movement gained ground with the founding of Women Against Violence in Pornography and Media (WAVPM) in 1977 in San Francisco, following a 1976 conference on violence against women held by local women's centers. Early members included Susan Griffin, Kathleen Barry, and Laura Lederer.

WAVPM organised the first national conference on pornography in San Francisco in 1978 which included the first Take Back the Night march. The conference led to anti-pornography feminists organizing in New York in 1979 under the banner of Women Against Pornography (WAP), and to similar organizations and efforts being created across the United States. In 1983, Page Mellish, a one-time member of WAVPM and of WAP, founded Feminists Fighting Pornography to focus on political activism seeking legal changes to limit the porn industry. Andrea Dworkin and Catharine MacKinnon wanted civil laws restricting pornography and to this end drafted the Antipornography Civil Rights Ordinance, also known as the Dworkin–MacKinnon Ordinance.

In her article Can We End the Feminist ‘Sex Wars’ Now? Comments on Linda Martín Alcoff, Rape and Resistance: Understanding the Complexities of Sexual Violation, Susan J. Brison explores the varying opinions of Catharine A. MacKinnon and Michel Foucault. MacKinnon states that the patriarchy is to blame for issues like exploitation and sex trafficking. She further claims that men hold authority, and the way to overcome this is to take legal action and hold the exploiters accountable. Foucault argues that sexuality is a social construct. Opposing MacKinnon's argument, legal action does not work if the issue is deeply rooted in the structure of society. According to Brison, combining these two ideologies could potentially end feminist sex wars once and for all. Addressing the institutional issues while applying appropriate legal action would create a more feminist way to help affected sex workers.

=== Sex-positive feminists ===
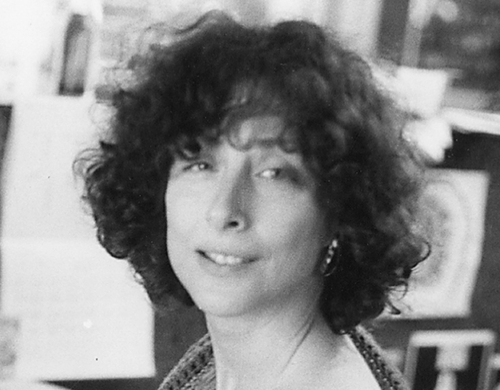
The terms pro-sex feminism and, later, sex-positive feminism were inspired by Ellen Willis.

From 1979, feminist journalist Ellen Willis was one of the early voices criticizing anti-pornography feminists for what she saw as sexual puritanism, moral authoritarianism and a threat to free speech. Her 1981 essay, Lust Horizons: Is the Women's Movement Pro-Sex? is the origin of the term, "pro-sex feminism". In response to the anti-pornography strand of feminism, sex-positive feminists promoted sex as an avenue of pleasure for women, seeing anti-pornography positions as aligned to the political right-wing's war on recreational sex and pornography. Early sex positive groups included Samois, founded in San Francisco in 1978, whose early members included Gayle Rubin and Pat Califia, and the Lesbian Sex Mafia, founded by Dorothy Allison and Jo Arnone in New York in 1981. The Feminist Anti-Censorship Taskforce (FACT) was set up in 1984 by Ellen Willis in response to the Dworkin–MacKinnon Ordinance; in 1989 Feminists Against Censorship formed in the UK, its members including Avedon Carol; and Feminists for Free Expression formed in the United States in 1992 by Marcia Pally, with founding members including Nadine Strossen, Joan Kennedy Taylor, Veronica Vera and Candida Royalle. Philosopher Amin R. Yacoub argues that defending sex work and the autonomy of those in the industry is the ethical thing to do. This view continues to claim that as long as the work is consensual, this form of work is legitimate with a positive consequence of fighting the patriarchy. Advocating for the rights of those in the industry gives them potential for autonomy and empowerment.

== Key events ==
In October 1980, the National Organization for Women identified what became known as the "Big Four" through declaring that "Pederasty, pornography, sadomasochism and public sex" were about "exploitation, violence or invasion of privacy" and not "sexual preference or orientation". One of the more memorable clashes between the pro-sex and anti-porn feminists occurred at the 1982 Barnard Conference on Sexuality. Anti-pornography feminists were excluded from the events’ planning committee, so they staged rallies outside the conference to show their disdain.

== Debates ==
The two sides of the feminist sex wars clashed over a number of issues, resulting in intense debates held both in person and in various media.

=== Pornography debate ===
Toward the end of the 1970s, much of the discourse in the feminist movement shifted from the discussion of lesbian feminism to focus on the new topic of sexuality. One of the primary concerns with sexuality was the issue of pornography, which caused a great divide among feminists. The two recognized sides of the debate were anti-pornography feminism and "pro-sex" feminism. One of the major influences of anti-pornography feminism was its predecessor, lesbian feminism. Anti-pornography movements developed from fundamental arguments displayed by lesbianism, such as the notion of patriarchal sexual relations. Ellen Willis described these relations as being "based on male power backed by force." From this perspective, pornography is created exclusively for men by men and is a direct reflection of the man-dominant paradigm surrounding sexual relations. Another idea taken from lesbian feminism by anti-pornography groups was that sexuality is about creating a compassionate bond and a lasting relation with another person, contrary to the belief of the purely physical nature of sex.

In her book, Pornography: Men Possessing Women, Andrea Dworkin argued that the theme of pornography is male dominance and as a result it is intrinsically harmful to women and their well-being. Dworkin believed that pornography is not only damaging in its production but also in its consumption, since the viewer will mentally internalize pornography's misogynistic portrayal of women. Robin Morgan summarized the view of anti-pornography feminists that pornography and violence against women are linked in her statement, "pornography is the theory, rape is the practice".

Jackie O’Brien criticizes the use of paywalls in the pornography industry. Pornography filters possibly take away autonomy from the sex workers. Their profits go to the companies they work for, which potentially means exploitation. However, a consequence is that the content from the sex workers gets used and distributed by third parties or private platforms. The content barricade does not address the structural roots of the issues in the porn industry. Anything surrounding this argument comes with nuance. It is difficult to find a middle ground between protecting the public from explicit content while protecting the rights of women in the industry.

The anti-pornography movement has been criticised by sex-positive feminists as a repression of sexuality and a move towards censorship. In her article, Thinking Sex: Notes for a Radical Theory of the Politics of Sexuality, Gayle Rubin characterizes sex liberation as a feminist goal and denounces the idea that anti-pornography feminists speak collectively for all of feminism. She offers the notion that what is needed is a theory of sexuality separate from feminism. In XXX: A Woman's Right to Pornography, Wendy McElroy summarizes the sex-positive perspective as "the benefits pornography provides to women far outweigh any of its disadvantages".

The pornography debate among radical and libertarian feminists has focused on the depictions of female sexuality in relation to male sexuality in this type of media. Radical feminists emphasize that pornography illustrates objectification and normalization of sexual violence through presentation of specific acts. In contrast, libertarian feminists are concerned with the stigmatization of sexual minorities and the limited right to practice sexual choice that would be hindered without pornography.

=== Sadomasochism debate ===
The main focus of the sex wars' debate on sadomasochism and other BDSM practices took place in San Francisco. Women Against Violence in Pornography and Media (WAVPM) was founded there in 1977. Its first political action was to picket a live show at a strip club featuring women performing sadomasochistic acts on each other, in line with its stated aim to end all portrayals of women being "bound, raped, tortured, killed or degraded for sexual stimulation or pleasure". As well as campaigning against pornography, WAVPM were also strongly opposed to BDSM, seeing it as ritualized violence against women and opposed its practice within the lesbian community. In 1978 Samois was formed, an organization for women in the BDSM community who saw their sexual practices as consistent with feminist principles. Several black lesbian feminists have written on this topic, including Audre Lorde, Alice Walker, Darlene Pagano, Karen Sims, and Rose Mason, condemning sadomasochism as an often racist practice, insensitive to the black female experience.

=== Prostitution debate ===
Another debate of the feminist sex wars centered on prostitution. Those who were opposed to pornography likewise argued against prostitution, claiming it is forced on women who have no alternatives. Meanwhile, sex-positive feminists argued that this position ignored the agency of women who chose sex work, viewing prostitution as not inherently based on the exploitation of women. Carol Leigh notes that "The Prostitutes rights movement of the early 1970s evolved directly from the women's movement", but adds: "The women's movement in the U.S. has always been ambivalent about prostitutes".

In her article The Sex Wars: Prostitution, Carceral Feminists, and the Consolidation of Police Power, Jessica R. Piley explains dominant feminists and how they tried to end prostitution for good. These feminists collaborated with law enforcement. In Sex Work and the Law, Anne Gray Fisher reframes the debate in terms of socioeconomic class, coming to the conclusion that although feminists on both sides of the debate had noble intentions to end the dangers of sex work, neither addressed the problems faced by marginalized communities. In Fisher's view, enforcement of anti-prostitution laws especially targeted Black, impoverished, and LGBT sex workers, while legalization strategies have primarily served to benefit white, affluent, and educated women.

== Effects ==
The polarization of feminist ideology during the sex wars has had wide-ranging effects. Examples include: "The confusion in the interpretation of the definition of human trafficking is a consequence of opposing feminist views on prostitution."

According to New Directions in Sex Therapy, the fields of sexology and sex therapy were made to keep a "low profile" during the 1970s and 1980s due to attacks from social conservatives and anti-pornography feminists.

The Feminist Sex Wars were a source of inspiration for the Canadian lesbian art collective Kiss & Tell. In 1994, the collective wrote a book called Her Tongue on My Theory: Images, Essays and Fantasies, which explored the debates surrounding this topic, specifically as they affected the censorship of queer art in Canada. Kiss & Tell's Vancouver exhibition Drawing the Line (1988-1990) also addressed the Feminist Sex War debates by presenting 98 photographs of lesbian sexual practices. Women viewers of the exhibition were invited to write their responses on the walls surrounding the images, bringing the debates to life in a physical space.

== Third-wave feminists' views ==
Third-wave feminist writings promote personal, individualized views on the gender-related issues focused on during the feminist sex wars, such as prostitution, pornography and sadomasochism. Items such as sex objects and porn, identified by some second-wave feminists as instruments of oppression are now no longer being exclusively used by men but also by women. Feminist critic Teresa de Lauretis sees the sex wars not in terms of polarized sides but as reflecting a third wave feminism inherently embodying difference, which may include conflicting and competing drives. Meanwhile, critic Jana Sawicki rejects both the polarized positions, seeking a third way that is neither morally dogmatic nor uncritically libertarian.

Sheila Rowbotham and the other socialist feminists who dominated the British women's movement saw women's liberation as inextricably linked to the demolition of capitalism. But it also required—and this is where they diverged from the Old Guard—a reconsideration of common patterns of life, such as sex, love, housework, and childrearing.

== See also ==
- Cultural feminism
- Female Chauvinist Pigs
- Female promiscuity
- Feminist views on BDSM
- Feminist views on pornography
- Feminist views on prostitution
- Feminist views on sexual orientation
- Feminist views on sexuality
- Feminist views on transgender topics
- Human female sexuality
- Sex-positive movement
- Sexual revolution
- Kiss & Tell lesbian art collective
