= Sexual repression =

Psychological state

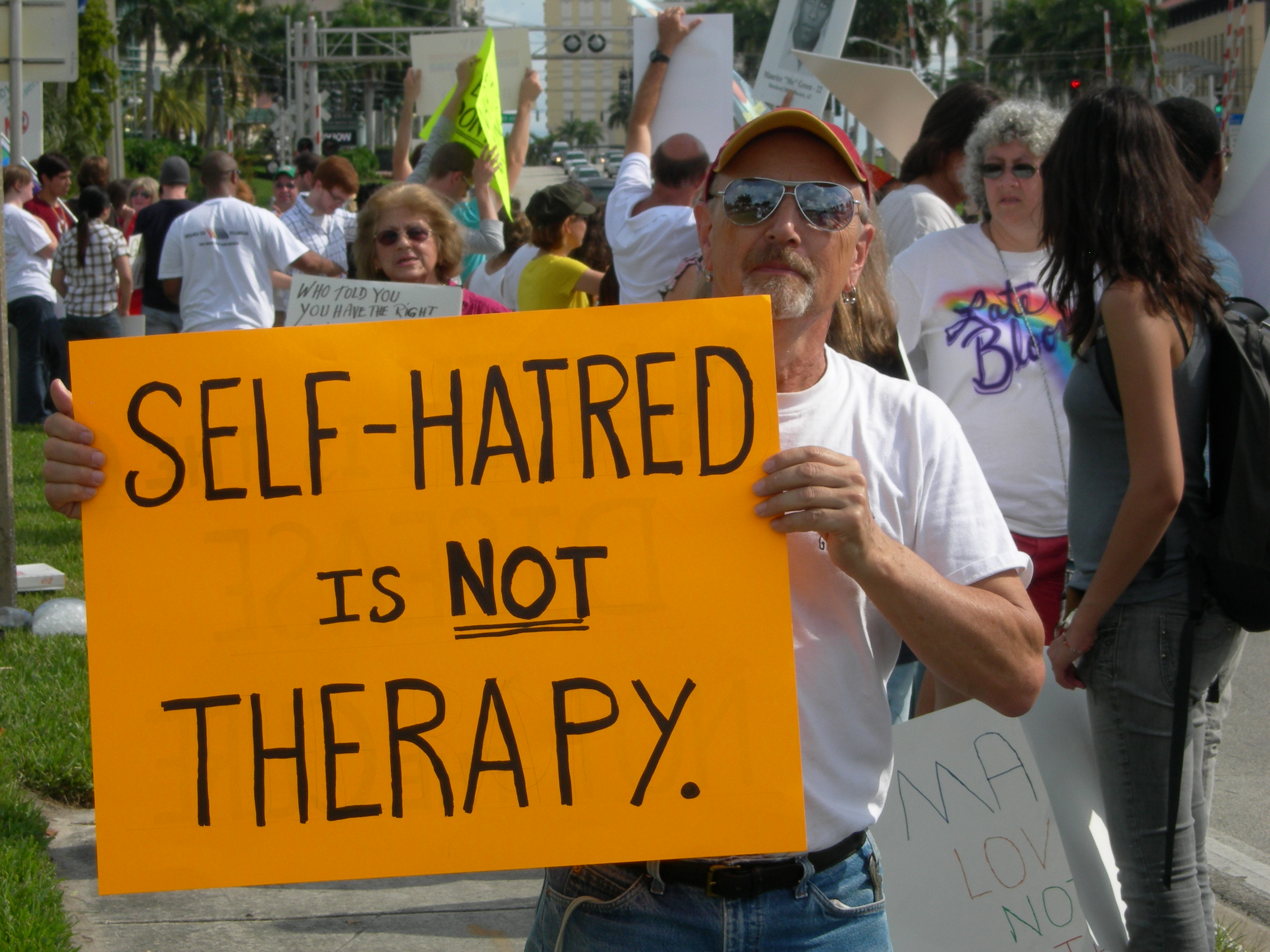
A man holding a sign in protest of laws allowing the practice of conversion therapy in 2009. Conversion therapy has been criticized for causing feelings of shame, guilt, and sexual repression among gay, lesbian, and bisexual individuals.

Sexual repression is a state in which a person is prevented from expressing their own sexuality or sexual orientation. Sexual repression can be caused by an emotional conflict, in which a person feels guilt, shame, or distress regarding their natural sexual impulses. These feelings of emotional distress can be exacerbated by outside factors, such as family, religion, and peer pressure. Sexual repression is often synonymous with internalized homophobia, in which a gay, lesbian, or bisexual person feels the need to suppress their own homosexual impulses and conform to heterosexual norms. Sexual repression can also be caused by external oppression, in which the laws of a society prevent someone from expressing their sexuality freely.

Defining characteristics and practices associated with sexual repression vary between societies and different historical periods. The behaviours and attitudes constituting sexual repression differ across cultures, religious communities and moral systems. Sexual repression can largely be categorised as physical, mental or an amalgam of both.

Sexual repression is enforced through legislation in certain countries, many of which are located in the Middle East and North Africa region, and South Asia. Common practices associated with the practice include female genital mutilation. Individuals believed to have engaged in behaviours contradicting social, religious or cultural expectations of sexual repression, such as same-sex sexual activity, may be punished through honor killings, persecution or the death penalty.

== History ==
Sigmund Freud was the first to use the term 'sexual repression' widely, and argued that it was one of the roots of many problems in Western society. Freud believed that people's naturally strong instincts toward sexuality were repressed by people in order to meet the constraints imposed on them by civilized life. Among many others, Freud believed renowned artist Leonardo da Vinci to have been a repressed homosexual, who he believed "sublimated" his sexual desires so as to achieve artistic brilliance. However, Freud's ideas about sexual repression have been subject to heavy criticism. According to sex therapist Bernard Apfelbaum, Freud did not base his belief in universal innate, natural sexuality on the strength of sexual desire he saw in people, but rather on its weakness.

In some periods of Indian history, anaphrodisiacs were utilised in order to lower libido.

In contemporary society, medication may be prescribed to registered sex offenders in order to lower the libido and ensure that further offences are less likely.

== Religious sexual repression ==
Sexual repression is a recurring prohibition in many religious contexts.

Most forms of Christianity discourage homosexual behavior.

Many forms of Islam have strict sexual codes which include banning homosexuality, demanding virginity before marriage, accompanied by a ban on fornication, and can require modest dress-codes for men and women.

Chemical castration has also been practiced upon male choristers prior to puberty to ensure that their vocal range remained unchanged.

The practice of creating "Castrati" was common until the 18th century, and after a decline in popularity were only used in the Vatican up until the beginning of the twentieth century (new research suggests that the employment of castrati was tolerated by the Vatican as late as 1959).

== Marriage ==
Marriage has historically been seen as means of controlling sexuality. Some forms of marriage, such as child marriage, are often practiced as a means of regulating the sexuality of girls, by ensuring they do not have multiple partners, thus preserving their virginity for their future husbands. According to the BBC World Service, "In some cases, parents willingly marry off their young girls in order to increase the family income or protect the girl from the risk of unwanted sexual advances or even promiscuity."

== Female genital mutilation ==
Prevalence of FGM in Africa

Female genital mutilation (FGM), also known as female genital cutting or female circumcision, "comprises all procedures that involve partial or total removal of the external female genitalia, or other injury to the female genital organs for non-medical reasons". The practice is concentrated in 27 countries in Africa as well as Iraqi Kurdistan, Yemen and Indonesia; and more than 125 million girls and women today are estimated to have been subjected to FGM.

FGM does not have any health benefits, and has serious negative effects on health; including complications during childbirth.

FGM is used as a way of controlling female sexuality; the World Health Organization (WHO) states:

FGM is often motivated by beliefs about what is considered proper sexual behaviour, linking procedures to premarital virginity and marital fidelity. FGM is in many communities believed to reduce a woman's libido and therefore believed to help her resist "illicit" sexual acts.

FGM is condemned by international human rights instruments. The Istanbul Convention prohibits FGM (Article 38). FGM is also considered a form a violence against women by the Declaration on the Elimination of Violence Against Women which was adopted by the United Nations in 1993; according to which: Article Two: Violence against women shall be understood to encompass, but not be limited to, the following: (a) Physical, sexual and psychological violence occurring in the family, including [...] female genital mutilation [...].

== Honor killings ==
An honor killing is the homicide of a member of a family or social group by other members, due to the perpetrators' belief that the victim has brought shame or dishonor upon the family or community, usually for reasons such as refusing to enter an arranged marriage, being in a relationship that is disapproved by their relatives, having sex outside marriage, becoming the victim of rape, dressing in ways which are deemed inappropriate, or engaging in homosexual relations. With regards to honor killings of women, according to a UN Expert Group Meeting that addressed harmful practices against women:

They [honor killings] stem from the deeply-rooted social belief that male family members (in some cases, mothers and other women are involved in planning or carrying out honor crimes) should control the sexuality of or protect the reputation of women in the family, and that they may contain their movements or kill them for blemishing family honor, even when rumors or false gossip are the reason for public suspicion.

== Same-sex sexual activity ==
Homosexual sexual expression is a sensitive topic in many societies. As of 2014, same-sex sexual acts are punishable by prison in 70 countries, and in five other countries and in parts of two others, homosexuality is punishable with the death penalty. Apart from criminal prosecution, LGBT individuals may also face social stigmatization and violence.

== Research findings ==
Researchers such as Peggy Reeves Sanday have proposed a relationship between sexual repression and rape. Evidence has been found to contradict this hypothesis, with a study by Jaffee and Straus finding "no relationship between sexually liberal attitudes and rape".

Sexual repression is a key talking point in feminism, although feminist views on sexuality vary widely.

=== Michel Foucault ===
Michel Foucault, in his History of Sexuality, refutes what he calls the "repressive hypothesis".

=== Sexual repression and sexual arousal ===
Although the typical expectation is that sexually repressed female individuals would experience less sexual arousal, one study regarding the effect of repression (among other variables) on sexual arousal concluded that repression-sensitization (R-S) and interactions with R-S did not have a significant effect on sexual arousal. These results were consistent with research performed in other studies regarding the same topic. Moreover, other research findings have demonstrated that repression may have differing effects between gender, namely, that "male repressors may inhibit sexual behavior, whereas female repressors do not."

== Repression in various countries ==
=== China ===
Reproduction-based sex was urged by Mao Zedong, but later politicians instituted a one-child policy. In a country where atheism is popular, the restriction cannot be ascribed to religion but to nationalist motives.

==== Sexual revolution ====
Within the past few decades, China has undergone major changes (known as the sexual revolution) in society that have affected their outlook on sex. Li Yinhe, China's first female sexologist, observed that prior to the sexual revolution, very few couples would engage in premarital sex. These observations were accredited to the fact that, until 1997, premarital sex in China was considered illegal and offenders could be prosecuted.

Furthermore, China's stance on sexuality before the sexual revolution was quite harsh in comparison to standards set by Western governments. China had previously banned the publication of pornography, organization of sex parties and prostitution, and even writing about sex. These regulations on sexuality before the revolution led to a legal precedent regarding the organization of prostitution in 1996 that had sentenced a bathhouse owner to death (though this is no longer punishable by death today). Today, the organization of sex parties is still illegal, although it is not strictly enforced anymore due to changes in Chinese attitudes which have led to fewer people reporting these sex parties.

However, the Chinese sexual revolution still has a lot of progress to make regarding the repression of the LGBT community. Although China has made some progress in the way of LGBT rights (namely, removing homosexuality from the list of mental illnesses), LGBT rights are still limited by some standards. For instance, same-sex marriage still has not been recognized legally, although there is the existence of guardianship, a recent development that many people consider as the first step to the legal recognition of same-sex marriage. In addition, Chinese law does not legally protect the LGBT community from discrimination in the workplace.

=== India ===
India has developed its discourse on sexuality differently based on its distinct regions with their own unique cultures. According to R.P. Bhatia, a New Delhi psychoanalyst and psychotherapist, middle-class India's "very strong repressive attitude" has made it impossible for many married couples to function well sexually, or even to function at all.

=== Japan ===
A Durex survey performed internationally resulted in Japan being the only country where more people have expressed discontent with their sex lives than those that have expressed fulfilling sex lives, an important major reason being that they are simply not having sex. Homebuilders in Japan have also observed that more than a third of homes built feature separated bedrooms for married couples, suggesting that even married couples are less inclined to have sex than married couples in other cultures.

==== Work culture and economy ====
Japanese citizens' dissatisfaction with their sex lives can be partially attributed to their work culture, whose work hours can be considered lengthy in comparison to other work cultures. According to Michael Zielenziger, Japan's lengthy work hours has led couples to spend less time with each other, have reduced contact, and therefore have less sex. Japan's sexual repression can also be partially attributed to societal and business expectations, which generally expect that women should abstain from marriage, which is a major indicator of sex likelihood. Although Japan's work hours have even shrunk down to the United States' level of work hours per week, large amounts of sexual dissatisfaction and repression are still observed. One reason for these observations is that Japan's economy has been stagnating and has contributed to more unemployment. These factors generate stress, which plays a significant role in forming an unpleasant sex life according to Durex.

=== Russia ===
Russian history of sexual repression and LGBT rights includes an oscillation of attitudes, caused by both governmental interference and changing societal norms.

==== Under the Soviet Union ====
Soviet society in the past considered sex to be taboo and unacceptable to talk about. People sometimes expressed fear of losing their job and experienced shame from people they knew for simply using the word 'sex' openly due to the fact that discussion regarding the topic of sex in the Soviet Union was almost nonexistent. Near the end of the Soviet Union, however, the country would undergo major changes when it came to sex. Organizations and media such as Tema and The Moscow Association of Lesbian Literature and Arts, which focused on sexual liberation, were created and promoted the discussion of sex in Russian society.

==== After the Soviet Union ====
The USSR's collapse also made way for LGBT rights to come to the forefront of societal issues. In 1993, Russia decriminalized homosexuality and set the precedent for future sociopolitical changes. New outlets of media – including pornography – regarding homosexuality were released within these years of social change. However, these changes would soon be quickly turned around when Vladimir Putin was elected in 2000. Despite previous failed attempts to revert the 1993 decriminalization of homosexuality, the Russian government created a turning point against LGBT rights in 2013 when Russia passed the gay propaganda law, which signaled Russia's return to more conservative and traditional values. The sexual repression of homosexuals with the passing of this law was partly because Russia wanted to portray itself as different from Western countries and demonstrate strength through these differences.

=== United States ===
In the last few decades the United States has been removing much of the legislation tied to sexual repression of various groups.

==== Birth control ====
The first half of the 1960s saw contraceptions such as the birth control pill and Intrauterine Device (IUD) become widely available, which contributed to sexual freedom for many people without having to rely on less reliable and uncomfortable physical contraceptives such as condoms or diaphragms. However, religious and conservative lobbying groups as well as the influence of neo-eugenics created push back on some other forms of birth control such as emergency contraception and tubal ligation. Emergency contraception was being developed and produced by Hoechst under the name RU-486. Conservative lobbyist groups with ties to various religious powers such as the Vatican, originally were promoting limiting healthcare coverage of items such as birth control, and once RU-486 was made public knowledge, these groups actively worked to threaten Hoechst by claiming they would cause the company financial hardship if they did not cease all activity pertaining to RU-486.

In terms of more permanent forms of birth control such as tubal ligation and hysterectomies, there has been a long history of eugenicists pushing for forced sterilization of non Anglo-Saxon or lower-class women. This stemmed from a belief that this would contribute to the betterment of American society. However, neo-eugenics, which is the more modern iteration of the eugenics movement, additionally works to limit access of procedures of sterilization from those they deem "fit" to reproduce. The demographic targeted for this are mostly white middle-class women.

==== Sex education ====
During the late 1990s and the Bush administration (2000–2008) abstinence-only sex education groups were given considerable government funding to develop programming for schools. These groups were mostly represented by Christians who believed it to be their responsibility to address what they deemed as society's regressions towards a sex-based culture. Abstinence advocates generally focus on prohibiting sexual contact before heterosexual marriage. This has been linked to instigating a culture of sexual repressiveness affecting adolescent sexual behaviors, regardless of their sexuality. Research concerning the effectiveness of different forms of sex education for adolescents shows the highest success from comprehensive sex education. Characteristics of comprehensive sex education include informing students on the forms of birth control and how to use them, and sexual anatomy. The Obama administration (2008–2016) worked towards promotion of comprehensive sex education programming and pulled much of the government funding supporting abstinence-only program development.

== Symptoms of sexual repression ==
Sexual repression can be expressed but not limited to the following:

- lack of sexual attraction
- disinterest in sexual activities
- shame and distress with sexual activities
- guilt or other negative feelings after having sex
- believing your body is unattractive or unworthy of sex

== See also ==
- Age of consent
- Antisexualism
- Asexuality
- Bodily integrity
- Roy Cohn – Attorney responsible for anti-gay Lavender scare who was also a closeted homosexual
- Erotophobia
- Free love
- Freedom of speech
- Heterosexism
- Human sexual activity
- Human sexuality
- Libertine
- Opposition to pornography
- Reproductive rights
- Sex-positive movement
- Sexual and reproductive health and rights
- Sexual norm
- Sexual frustration
- Sexual revolution
- Victorian morality
