= Laura Lederer =

American legal scholar

- Born: Laura J. Lederer; December 12, 1951 (age 74); Detroit, Michigan
- Education: University of Michigan (BA); DePaul University College of Law (JD)
- Occupations: Associate Professor of Law Feminist Activist and Scholar
- Employer: Georgetown University Law Center
- Board member of: Global Centurion; Global Fund for Women (Founding Member, 1988–1992)

Laura J. Lederer (born 1951) is an American legal scholar and former senior advisor on trafficking in persons in the Office for Democracy and Global Affairs of the United States Department of State. She has also been an activist against human trafficking, prostitution, pornography, and hate speech. Lederer is founder of The Protection Project, a human rights research institute at Johns Hopkins University.

== Early life ==
Lederer was born in the Detroit area, to parents Natalie and Creighton Lederer, a Detroit Commissioner of Buildings and Safety in the Coleman Young administration. She was born into a multifaith household, with a Jewish father and Lutheran mother who were practicing Unitarian Universalists, and studied comparative religion as an undergraduate at University of Michigan. As part of her undergraduate work, she spent two years studying under and working for David Noel Freedman, and graduated with a BA magna cum laude in 1975.

== Career summary ==
=== Past career ===
In the mid-1970s she was an activist and leader in the violence against women movement. In 1977 she helped found and then directed the first women's anti-pornography organization in the country. Also in 1977, became an associate of the Women's Institute for Freedom of the Press (WIFP).

== Anti-pornography activism (1976–1981) ==
In late 1976, she accompanied a friend to a San Francisco conference on violence against women. A display at the conference included images from magazine advertising, softcore pornography, and hardcore pornography, including child pornography. Lederer stated in a later interview: "You saw the influence of the really hard-core images, back through the soft-core to the mainstream. Images were repeated. That's how I got involved. It kind of clicked." Several participants in the conference proposed to keep meeting and form an organization devoted to protesting violent images of women. In January 1977, this organization was started, which after several name changes became Women Against Violence in Pornography and Media (WAVPM). Lederer signed on as the organization's national coordinator and editor of its newsletter.

As coordinator of WAVPM, Lederer helped organize protests and boycotts against companies such as Max Factor and Finnair whose advertising the organization felt encouraged violence against women. She also organized educational tours of pornographic businesses in San Francisco's red light districts, a tactic later emulated by Women Against Pornography. Lederer worked closely with then-Supervisor Dianne Feinstein on a San Francisco anti-pornography zoning ordinance targeting sex-related businesses. Lederer was aided in this effort by the fact that her father, in the role of Building Commissioner in Detroit, had worked vigorously for shaping and enforcing a similar zoning ordinance in that city. Lederer traveled to Detroit to research the ordinance there, and passed the results along to Feinstein. Though the zoning ordinance faced stiff opposition (notably from the San Francisco ACLU and from Harvey Milk), a milder version of this ordinance was passed in 1978.

In the summer of 1978, Lederer brought on Lynn Campbell to help organize WAVPM and together they helped organize Feminist Perspectives on Pornography, the first national anti-pornography feminist conference held in San Francisco on November 17–19, 1978. The conference drew many well known feminist speakers, notably Gloria Steinem, Robin Morgan, Phyllis Chesler, Kathleen Barry, Susan Brownmiller and Andrea Dworkin. This conference was significant in that it served as a galvanizing event for the anti-pornography feminist movement in the United States. The final event of the conference was the first Take Back the Night march, which converged on the Broadway red light district. The talks given during the event were later collected in the anthology Take Back the Night—a work which was compiled and edited by Lederer and would go on to stand as a key document in the emerging feminist anti-pornography movement.

== Anti-human trafficking work ==
=== Early anti-human trafficking work (1993–2001) ===
In 1994, Lederer founded The Protection Project, a legal research institute dedicated to tracking and combating human trafficking. There, she created a database of foreign national law on involuntary servitude, slavery, trafficking in persons and related issues. In 1998 Lederer oversaw the project's transition to the John F. Kennedy School of Government at Harvard University, where she remained for three years (1998–2001). A core component of this work centered on the publication of the first Human Rights Report on Trafficking in Persons, a document pre-dating the U.S. government TIP Report that tracked and evaluated in 194 countries the global routes, patterns, and trends in human trafficking as well as laws, law enforcement, and case law addressing it.

During the drafting of the Trafficking Victims Protection Act, from 1998 to 2000, she served as a witness in Senate Foreign Relations Committee and House International Relations Committee hearings held by Representatives Chris Smith and Sam Gejdenson and the late Senator Paul Wellstone and Senator Sam Brownback, testifying on the global nature and scope of the problem of trafficking in persons. She was instrumental in bringing trafficking victims from over a dozen countries to testify in Congress. In 1998, she also helped bring together a new bi-partisan anti-trafficking coalition of women's groups and faith-based groups. This coalition played a role in the passage of the Trafficking Victims Protection Act of 2000.

=== Senior Advisor on Human Trafficking (2001–2009) ===
In 2001, as Deputy Senior Advisor to the Secretary of State she helped set up the Office to Monitor and Combat Trafficking in Persons at the U.S. Department of State. In From 2002 to 2009, she served as Senior Advisor on Trafficking in Persons to Under Secretary of State for Democracy and Global Affairs, Paula J. Dobriansky. In that capacity she advised the Under Secretary on policy formulation and development, program creation and implementation, and long-range planning for the Office for Global Affairs.

Lederer was Senior Advisor on Human Trafficking at the U.S. Department of State during the administration of George W. Bush. She was responsible for designing specialized anti-trafficking programs, including "TIP and New Technologies," "The Economics of Trafficking," "The Health Implications of Trafficking," and a new program to research the impact of sex selection and gender imbalance on human trafficking. In addition to her duties as Senior Advisor, she was instrumental in creating the Senior Policy Operating Group on Trafficking in Persons, for which she was Executive Director from 2001 to 2009. This high-level interagency policy group staffs the cabinet-level President's Interagency Task Force on Trafficking in Persons. She is also an adjunct professor of law at the Georgetown University Law Center.

As of 2010, Lederer is actively involved in combating human trafficking. Both in her role as President of Global Centurion, a Washington DC–based NGO which seeks to eradicate child sex trafficking by focusing on the demand for trafficked children; and as founder and coordinator of Triple S Network, a group of nearly 100 NGOs active against sex trafficking.

=== Media consultant ===
- "The Day My God Died": Lederer was an expert consultant to this, a feature-length documentary, which casts a spotlight on the devastating impact child sex trafficking has wreaked upon young girls in Bombay, India.

== Philanthropic work ==
Lederer engaged in designing grant programs for philanthropic organizations. She served as an officer at the Skaggs Foundation beginning in 1979 and was a founding member of the Global Fund for Women in 1987. In 1989, she began her legal education at University of San Francisco before transferring after one year to DePaul University College of Law, where she earned a Juris Doctor in 1994.

== Education, awards, and honors ==
- 2012 Gray/Wawro Lecturer on Gender, Health, and Well-Being at Rice University's James Baker III Institute
- 2009 September, recipient of the University of Michigan College of Literature, Science, and the Arts Humanitarian Service Award for her work to abolish human trafficking.
- Recipient of the Paul H. Nitze School of Advanced International Studies Protection Project Human Rights Award for her "invaluable contribution to the global movement to stop human trafficking."
- 1997–2001 ECPAT (End Child Prostitution and Trafficking) USA, Board of Directors
- 1997 recipient the Gustavus Meyers Center for Study of Human Rights Annual Award for Outstanding Work on Human Rights for book on hate speech, The Price We Pay.
- 1985 Served on National Task Force on Missing Children Advisory Council (precursor to the National Center for Missing and Exploited Children), U.S. Office of Juvenile Justice, in 1985..

== Publications ==
- Editor and contributor, "Take Back the Night: Women on Pornography", published in 1980 by William and Morrow.
- Editor, The Price We Pay: The Case Against Racist Speech, Hate Propaganda, and Pornography, published by Farrar, Straus and Giroux in 1995.
- Author, "Where have all the young girls gone? Female Feticide and its Impact on Human Trafficking"
- Author, "The Health Consequences of Sex Trafficking and Their Implications for Identifying Victims in Healthcare Facilities", published in 2014 by Loyola University Chicago Annals of Health Laws

== Sources ==
- Bronstein, Carolyn (2011). Battling Pornography: The American Feminist Anti-Pornography Movement, 1976-1986. Cambridge University Press. ISBN 978-1-107-40039-9.
- Sides, Josh (2006). "Excavating the postwar sex district in San Francisco". Journal of Urban History. 32 (3): 355–379. doi:10.1177/0096144205282713. S2CID 144555984.
