= 1982 Barnard Conference on Sexuality =

The Barnard Conference on Sexuality is often credited as the moment that signaled the beginning of the Feminist Sex Wars. It was held at Barnard College (a private women's liberal arts college in New York City) on April 24, 1982, and was presented as the annual Scholar and Feminist Conference IX, an integral part of the Barnard Center for Research on Women. The theme of the Conference was Sexuality. The Conference was set up as a framework for feminist thought to proceed regarding topics that many felt uncomfortable talking about. As Carole Vance, the Academic Coordinator of the Conference wrote in her letter inviting the participants "sexuality is a bread and butter issue, not a frill."

== History ==
The Barnard Sex Conference was held in 1982 by the Barnard Center for Research on Women, then known as the Women's Center. It was organized by a group of feminists that included Ellen Dubois, Ellen Willis, Gayle Rubin, and was led by Carole Vance. Jane Gould, the director of the Women's Center then, calls it the "most controversial and perhaps the most important conference". The women who took part understood that this conference was important in light of the growing Women Against Pornography (WAP) movement led by Andrea Dworkin, Susan Brownmiller, and Robin Morgan. Therefore, the aim was to "move beyond debates about violence and pornography and to focus on sexuality apart from reproduction". The Conference was not fully supported by the college itself, as Gould narrates in her autobiography. Many Barnard faculty members dropped out of the planning committee. Days before the Conference, the then President of Barnard College, Ellen V. Futter, began receiving phone calls and letters from WAP and other groups against the premise of the Conference. The day before the conference was scheduled to begin, Barnard College officials—in response to phone calls from angry members of anti-pornography groups—confiscated 1500 copies of Diary of a Conference on Sexuality, designed by Hannah Alderfer, Beth Jaker, and Marybeth Nelson. The Diary, which was intended for distribution to conference participants, was a compilation of steering committee minutes, personal narratives, information about conference events, and work by feminist artists. Angry letters and threats of losing funding were also major concerns. Despite all of the contention, the organizers went ahead with the event.

The day of the Conference was extremely controversial. The Conference was picketed by the anti-pornography feminist group. WAP members picketed the conference and gave out handouts, leaflets and protests, wearing T-shirts with the words "For a Feminist Sexuality" on the front and "Against S/M" on the back. Accusations about the specific sexual practices of individual women involved in the conference were central to the outcry around the event. The Conference was very publicized in the news afterwards. Many articles and books have been inspired by this conference, the most famous being Carole Vance's Pleasure and Danger: Exploring Female Sexuality. The Lesbian Sex Mafia organized a radical "Speakout on Politically Incorrect Sex" rally at the conference.
