= Ivy Bottini =

American activist and artist (1926–2021)

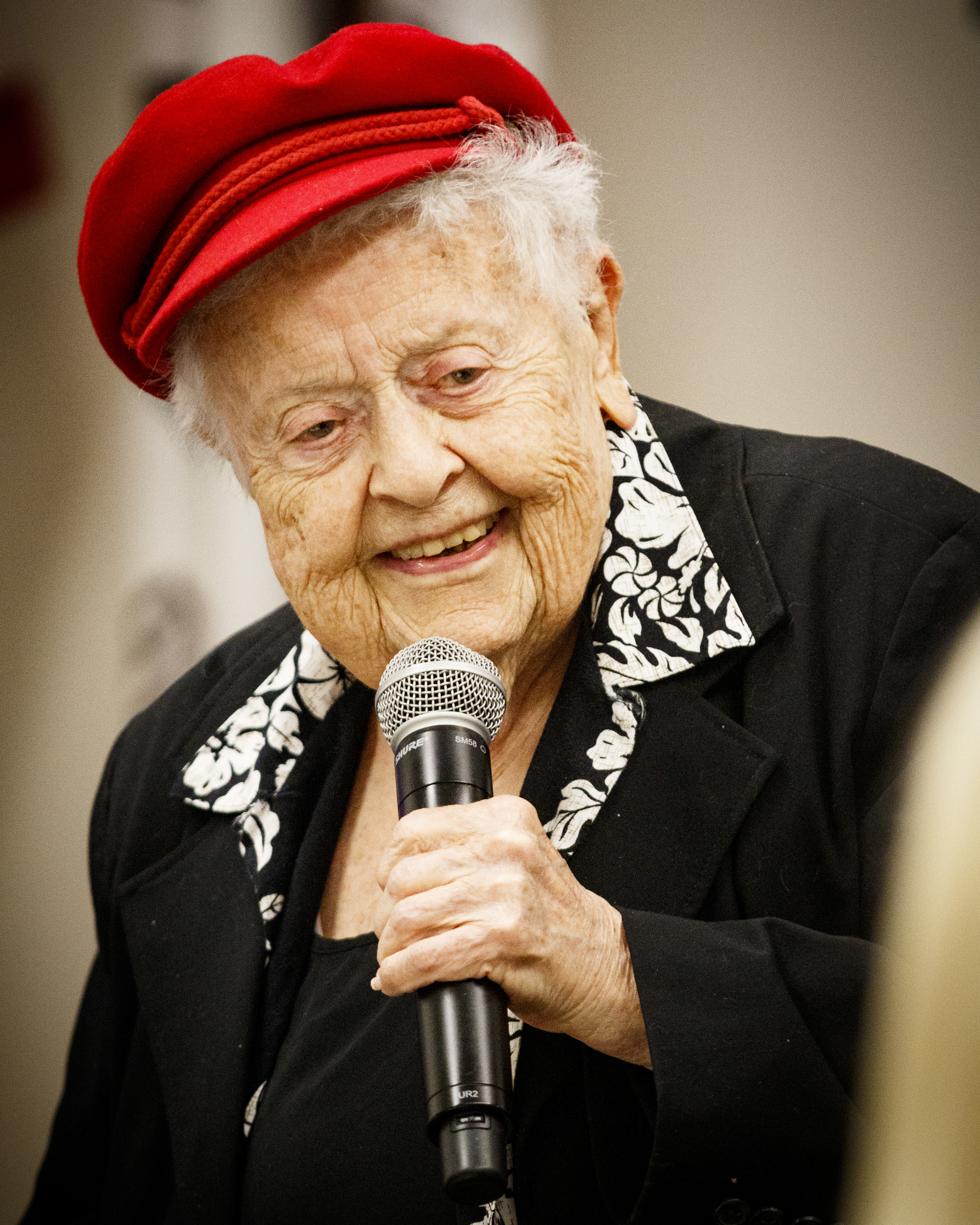
- Bottini speaking at Stonewall Democratic Club in 2019
- Born: August 15, 1926; Lynbrook, New York, USA
- Died: February 25, 2021 (aged 94)
- Education: Pratt Institute
- Occupations: Activist; artist
- Organization: National Organization for Women
- Spouse: Edward Bottini (m. 1952; div. 1968)
- Children: 2

Ivy Bottini (August 15, 1926 – February 25, 2021) was an American activist for women's and LGBTQ rights, and a visual artist.

== Personal life and career ==
Bottini was born Ivy Gaffney was born in Lynbrook, New York on August 15th, 1926, to parents Archie and Ivy. She graduated from Malverne High School in nearby Malverne, New York. From 1944 until 1947, she attended Pratt Institute School of Art, where she earned a certificate in advertising graphic design and illustration. She married Edward Bottini in 1951. She was employed for sixteen years at the east coast daily newspaper Newsday, until her move to Los Angeles in 1971.

Bottini realized she had same sex attractions at an early age. Her first crush was on her first grade female gym teacher. During an interview with The Lavender Effect, Bottini said she fell "in love with every gym teacher I ever had in my life." She also formed a close, platonic relationship with one of her seventh grade teachers, who became a parental figure for her.

Despite her attraction to women, Bottini did not pursue lesbian relationships, due to the cultural norms of the time. She was engaged to several men, with each engagement lasting only a few weeks before she'd end the relationship. She married her husband of sixteen years, Eddie, on January 12, 1952. Leading up to the marriage, Bottini began experiencing physical symptoms involving her ability to swallow food properly. Her doctor realized her symptoms were related to anxiety and referred her to a psychiatrist. She expressed to the psychiatrist that she felt attracted to women, but the psychiatrist told her she was not homosexual. He suggested she abandon her friends and interests and "cleave" to her soon-to-be husband, Eddie.

Years later, a coworker, Delores Alexander, introduced Bottini to the National Organization for Women (NOW). Alexander had just interviewed NOW president Betty Friedan and felt it would be a useful organization for Bottini to join. Bottini helped found the New York chapter of NOW in 1966. Soon after becoming president of the New York chapter of NOW in 1968 she came out as a lesbian. She left her husband and moved in with a woman in New York City.

She also studied acting at Lee Strasberg Theatre and Film Institute and performed a one-woman show, The Many Faces of Women, nationwide.

Bottini later worked as a graphic artist.

Her memoir, The Liberation of Ivy Bottini: A Memoir of Love and Activism, as told to Judith V. Branzburg, was published by Bedazzled Ink Publishing Company in November 2018.

Bottini died in Florida on February 25, 2021, at the age of 94.

== Activism ==
In 1966, she helped found the New York chapter of the National Organization for Women. In 1968, she was elected the president of the New York chapter of the National Organization for Women; she came out as a lesbian later that year. In 1969, she designed the logo for the National Organization for Women which is still their logo today. Also in 1969, she held a public forum titled "Is Lesbianism a Feminist Issue?", which was the first time lesbian concerns were introduced into the National Organization for Women. In 1970, she led a demonstration at the Statue of Liberty where she and others from the National Organization for Women's New York chapter draped an enormous banner over a railing which read "WOMEN OF THE WORLD UNITE!" During her time at the National Organization for Women's New York chapter she also introduced feminist consciousness raising, which was later adapted for all chapters in the organization to participate in. However, later in 1970 Betty Friedan engineered the expulsion of lesbians from the National Organization for Women's New York chapter, including Bottini.

When Kate Millett was speaking about sexual liberation at Columbia University in 1970, a woman in the audience asked her, "Why don't you say you're a lesbian, here, openly. You've said you were a lesbian in the past." Millett hesitantly responded, "Yes, I am a lesbian". A couple of weeks later, Time's December 8, 1970 article "Women's Lib: A Second Look" reported that Millett admitted she was bisexual, which it said would likely discredit her as a spokesperson for the feminist movement because it "reinforce[d] the views of those skeptics who routinely dismiss all liberationists as lesbians." In response, two days later a press conference was organized by Bottini and Barbara Love in Greenwich Village which led to a statement in the name of 30 lesbian and feminist leaders which declared their "solidarity with the struggle of homosexuals to attain their liberation in a sexist society".

Bottini moved to Los Angeles in 1971. There she founded the Los Angeles Lesbian/Gay Police Advisory Board. In 1977, she created and hosted the first Lesbian/Gay radio show on a mainstream network (KHJ in Los Angeles).

In 1978, she was the Southern California deputy director of the successful campaign against the Briggs Initiative (No on 6), which would have banned gays and lesbians from teaching in California's public schools. She later chaired the successful No on LaRouche and No on 64 Initiative campaign. The Larouche initiative (Number 64), which was not passed, might have quarantined people with AIDS. In 1981 she was appointed by then-governor Jerry Brown as Commissioner for "California Commission on Aging", making her the first "out" lesbian or gay person to be appointed to a state board or commission. In 1983 she co-founded AIDS Project Los Angeles.

In 1993, she co-founded the nonprofit organization Gay & Lesbian Elder Housing, which in 2007 developed Triangle Square, the first affordable housing complex for gay and lesbian senior citizens in the country. From 1998 until 1999, she co-chaired the addiction and recovery city task force, and established the ad hoc committee City of West Hollywood, to publicize the issue of lesbian and gay partner abuse.

Also in 1999, she chaired the National Organization for Women's annual national conference, called Pioneer Reunion, in Beverly Hills. Shortly after, she co-chaired the Lesbian and Gay Advisory Board for the City of West Hollywood from 2000 to 2010. In 2001, she was part of a lesbian and gay rights coalition that formed the Alliance for Diverse Community Aging Services to help lesbian and gay seniors obtain assisted living and affordable retirement. In 2011, she designed t-shirts for the Dyke March in Los Angeles.

She and the LGBT history organization Lavender Effect advocated for an LGBT museum in Los Angeles. She also advocated for the creation of an AIDS memorial in West Hollywood.

Her papers and certain audio recordings are held by ONE National Gay and Lesbian Archives. In 2009, the film On These Shoulders We Stand profiled Ivy Bottini as well as ten other LGBT activists from the early LGBT rights movement in Los Angeles. She participated in an Oral History project by The Lavender Effect, which documented her personal life and work as an activist. In her last known interview, Bottini spoke about her work on the podcast, LGBTQ&A.

== Awards ==
In 1991, she received Drama Logues' "Best Performance Award" for Against the Rising Sea.

In 1998, the Ivy Theater was established in her honor in West Hollywood.

In 2001, in the Matthew Shepard Memorial Triangle a tree was planted in her honor, and a plaque was placed at the foot of it.

In 2005, she was awarded the Cultural Icon Award by the Tom of Finland Foundation.

In 2007, she received the Morris Kight Lifetime Achievement Award from Christopher Street West Los Angeles LGBT Pride.
