= Women Against Violence in Pornography and Media =

Anti-pornography activist group

Women Against Violence in Pornography and Media (WAVPM) was a feminist anti-pornography activist group based in San Francisco and an influential force in the larger feminist anti-pornography movement of the late 1970s and 1980s.

== History ==
WAVPM was organized in January 1977, following the San Francisco Women's Centers Conference on Violence Against Women. Founding members included Laura Lederer, Lynn Campbell, Diana Russell, Kathleen Barry, and Susan Griffin.

It became highly active in San Francisco, picketing strip clubs and peep shows in San Francisco's red-light districts. Its first public political action was a picket of the Mitchell Brothers O'Farrell Theatre, a strip club and live sex venue. The specific target of the protest was the theater's Ultra Room, which was a live show that featured women performing sadomasochistic acts on one another. WAVPM objected to "women beat[ing] each other for men's sexual stimulation." WAVPM also sponsored educational tours of pornography stores and peep shows in San Francisco's red-light districts and anti-pornography slide shows, both forms of activism later adopted by other anti-pornography feminist groups, notably Women Against Pornography in New York City.

WAVPM, like later anti-pornography feminists, was also strongly opposed to BDSM, seeing it as ritualized violence against women, and took a particularly active role in opposing it within the lesbian community. This set them on a direct collision course with Samois, an early lesbian sadomasochist group who WAVPM strongly rebuked and whose functions they sometimes picketed. Samois members felt strongly that their way of practicing SM was entirely compatible with feminism, and held that the kind of feminist sexuality advocated by WAVPM was conservative and puritanical. Samois openly confronted WAVPM with their position, and the exchanges between Samois and WAVPM were among the earliest battles of what later became known as the Feminist Sex Wars.

The group organized the first national conference of anti-pornography feminists in San Francisco in November 1978. The conference concluded with the first organisational Take Back the Night march, inspired by the efforts of grassroots communities in the early 70s. Andrea Dworkin gave a speech at the rally, and then about three thousand women marched through the red light district in protest of rape and pornography.

After the conference, Susan Brownmiller approached Laura Lederer and Lynn Campbell and encouraged them to come to New York City to help in organizing Women Against Pornography. Lederer decided to stay in San Francisco to edit an anthology based on the conference presentations, but Campbell took up the offer and left for New York in April 1979.

WAVPAM became less active soon after Campbell's departure, though the group stayed active for several more years. At its peak, the group had over 1000 members. The group became mired in disagreements over stances on non-violent pornography, free speech issues, and attempts to reconcile with sex worker and lesbian BDSM activists, as well as having problems with fundraising and mounting debt. WAVPM disbanded in 1983.
