= Feminist views on pornography =

Feminist views on pornography range widely between schools of thought, from total condemnation of the medium as a form of violence against women, to an embrace of some pornography as a medium of feminist expression. Feminist debates on pornography reflect the breadth of feminist views on sexuality, relating to those on prostitution, BDSM, and other issues. Pornography has been one of the most divisive issues in feminism, particularly in Anglophone (English-speaking) countries. This division was exemplified in the feminist sex wars of the 1980s, which pitted anti-pornography activists against pro-pornography ones.

== Anti-pornography feminism ==
External videos
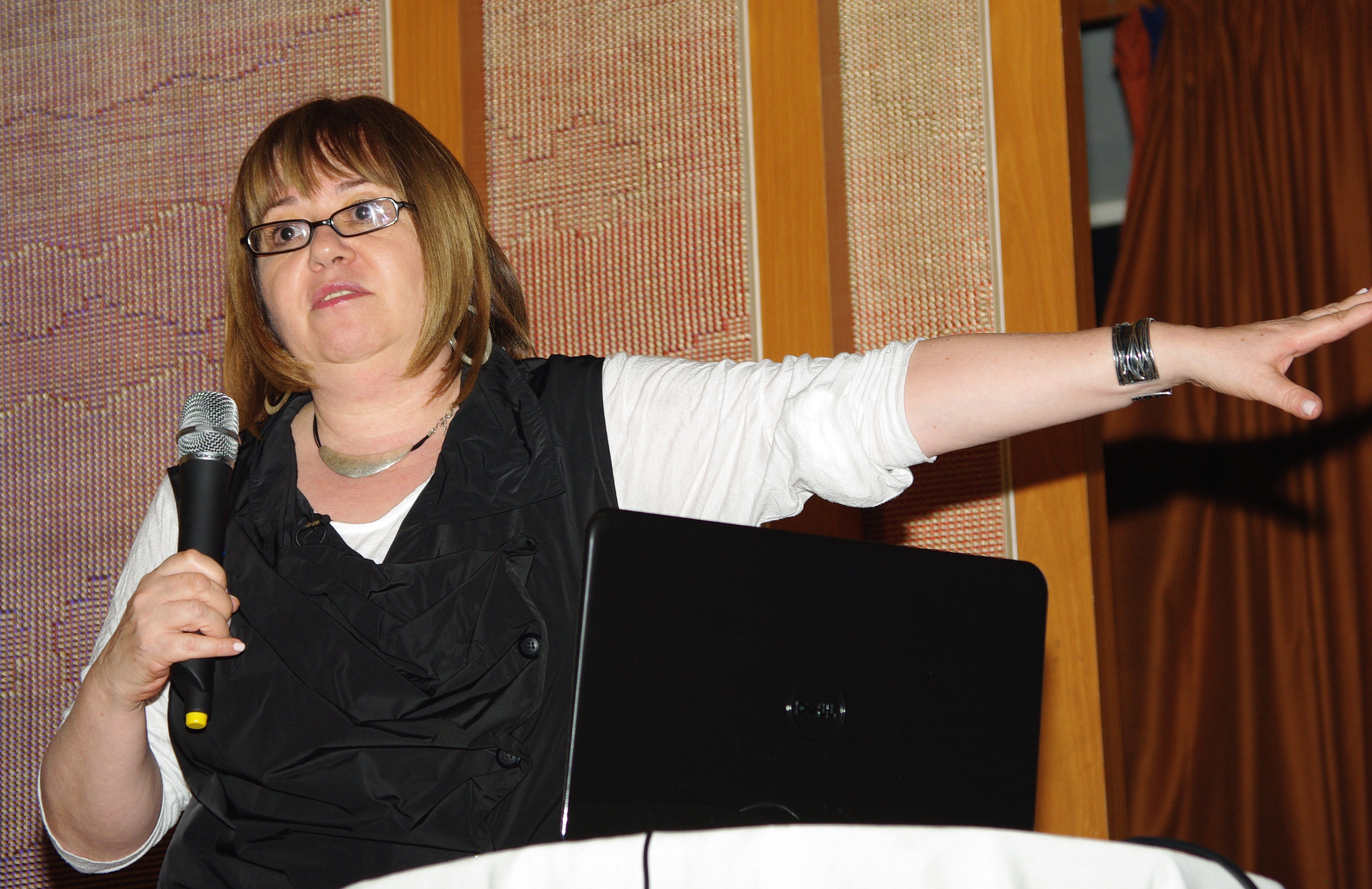
- Growing Up in a Pornified Culture, Gail Dines, TEDx

Feminist opponents of pornography—such as Andrea Dworkin, Catharine MacKinnon, Robin Morgan, Diana Russell, Alice Schwarzer, Gail Dines, and Robert Jensen—argue that pornography is harmful to women, and constitutes strong causality or facilitation of violence against women.

Catharine MacKinnon and Andrea Dworkin had separately staked out a position that pornography was inherently exploitative toward women, and they called for a civil law to make pornographers accountable for harms that could be shown to result from the use, production, and circulation of their publications. When Dworkin testified before the Meese Commission in 1986, she said that 65 to 75 percent of women in prostitution and hard-core pornography had been victims of incest or child sexual abuse.

Andrea Dworkin's activism against pornography during the 1980s brought her to national attention in the United States.

=== Harm to women during production ===
Anti-pornography feminists, notably Catharine MacKinnon, charge that the production of pornography entails physical, psychological, and/or economic coercion of the women who perform and model in it. This is said to be true even when the women are being presented as enjoying themselves. Catharine MacKinnon argues that the women in porn are "not there by choice but because of a lack of choices." It is also argued that much of what is shown in pornography is abusive by its very nature. Gail Dines holds that pornography, exemplified by Gonzo pornography, is becoming increasingly violent and that women who perform in pornography are brutalized in the process of its production.

Anti-pornography feminists point to the testimony of well known participants in pornography, such as Traci Lords and Linda Boreman, and argue that most female performers are coerced into pornography, either by somebody else, or by an unfortunate set of circumstances. The feminist anti-pornography movement was galvanized by the publication of Ordeal, in which Linda Boreman (who under the name of "Linda Lovelace" had starred in Deep Throat) stated that she had been beaten, raped, and pimped by her husband Chuck Traynor, and that Traynor had forced her at gunpoint to make scenes in Deep Throat, as well as forcing her, by use of both physical violence against Boreman as well as emotional abuse and outright threats of violence, to make other pornographic films. Dworkin, MacKinnon, and Women Against Pornography issued public statements of support for Boreman, and worked with her in public appearances and speeches. In this instance, both against and pro-pornography feminists recognize that "exploitation and abuse of vulnerable women does sometimes occur to produce some pornography," but situations like Boreman's are viewed by some feminists as preventable and not as an essential aspect of producing pornographic material.

=== Social effects ===
==== Sexual objectification ====
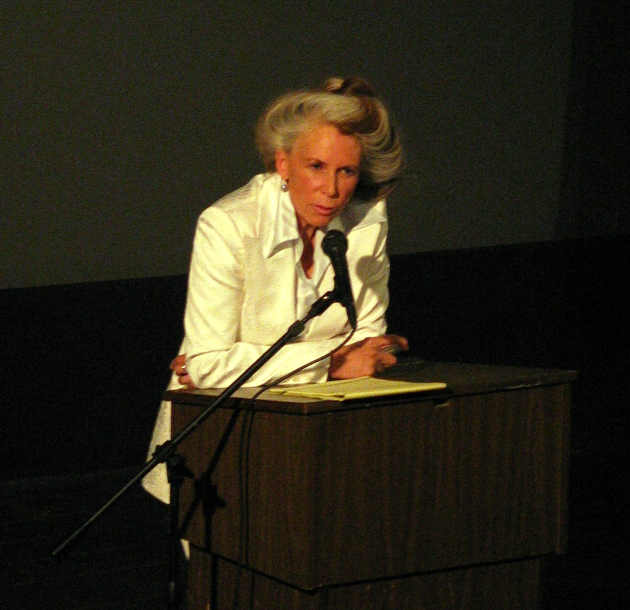
Catharine MacKinnon in 2006

MacKinnon and Dworkin defined pornography as "the graphic sexually explicit subordination of women through pictures or words". According to Dworkin, the original definition of the word pornography was "the graphic depiction of whores." Whore is a term that has historically been used to describe sex workers. Dworkin believes that sex workers are frequently treated not as human but merely as objects for sexual gratification. Johanna Schorn, writing for Gender Forum, stated that "the very meaning of the word pornography, then and now, seems to point towards the misogynistic and exploitative practices of the industry."

The effects produced by those who view pornography are mixed and still widely debated. Generally, research has been focused around the effects of voluntary viewing of pornography. There have also been studies analyzing the inadvertent exposure to explicit sexual content, including: viewing photographs of naked people, people engaging in sexual acts, accidental web searches, or opening online links to pornographic material. It has been found that most exposure to pornography online is unsolicited and by accident. Forty-two percent of those who view online pornography are ages ranging between 10 and 17; sixty-six percent have experienced inadvertent exposure.

The feeling of anonymity may prompt an individual to disregard social norms and pursue more extreme stimuli. Valerie Webber in her article "Shades of Gay: Performance of Girl-on-Girl Pornography and mobile authenticities" differentiates the sex depicted in porn and personal, private sexual encounters. At first, she argues that performing sex produces normative ideas about what makes sex authentic. These normative beliefs then transfer into personal experiences where people feel an obligation to perform sex as they have viewed it in pornography.

==== Incitement to sexual violence against women ====
Anti-pornography feminists say that consumption of pornography is a cause of rape and other forms of violence against women. Robin Morgan summarizes this idea with her often-quoted statement, "Pornography is the theory, and rape is the practice."

Anti-pornography feminists charge that pornography eroticizes the domination, humiliation, and coercion of women, and reinforces sexual and cultural attitudes that are complicit in rape and sexual harassment. MacKinnon argued that pornography leads to an increase in sexual violence against women through fostering rape myths. Such rape myths include the belief that women really want to be raped and that they mean yes when they say no. Additionally, according to MacKinnon, pornography desensitizes viewers to violence against women, and this leads to a progressive need to see more violence in order to become sexually aroused, an effect she acknowledges is well documented.

==== Rape of children ====
Gail Dines claims that interviews she conducted with men incarcerated for the rape of a prepubescent child showed that all of the interviewed were at first "horrified at the idea" of raping a child, but started "habitual" consumption of images depicting sexual abuse of minors after becoming bored with regular porn. The sexual abuse then happened within six months.

==== Distorted view of the human body and sexuality ====
German radical feminist Alice Schwarzer is one proponent of this point of view, in particular in the feminist magazine Emma. Many opponents of pornography believe that pornography gives a distorted view of men and women's bodies, as well as the actual sexual act, often showing the performers with synthetic implants or exaggerated expressions of pleasure, as well as fetishes that are not the norm, such as watersports, being presented as popular and normal. Catharine MacKinnon echoes these views by asserting that pornography "desensitizes consumers to violence and spreads rape myths and other lies about women's sexuality."

Harry Brod offered a Marxist feminist view, "I [Brod] would argue that sex seems overrated [to men] because men look to sex for fulfillment of nonsexual emotional needs, a quest doomed to failure. Part of the reason for this failure is the priority of quantity over quality of sex which comes with sexuality's commodification."

==== Hatred of women ====
Gail Dines said, "'[p]ornography is the perfect propaganda piece for patriarchy. In nothing else is their hatred of us quite as clear.'" Likewise, MacKinnon describes pornography as something that fuels male misogyny by "eroticizing women's degradation." MacKinnon also states that "pornography is violence against women" and is "a civil rights violation" that "amounts to terrorism" against women.

==== Sex trafficking ====
MacKinnon argues that the consumption of pornography fuels the prostitution and sex trafficking industry. MacKinnon claims that the production of pornography is "itself a form of prostitution and trafficking." which creates a demand for women to fill the roles in porn, including women who may have been trafficked. According to MacKinnon, the relationship between pornography, prostitution, and sex trafficking is closely related and a central aspect of this relationship relies on the buying of sex with women as an experience, which requires more women, trafficked or not, to produce these experiences and fill demand.

In an article discussing OnlyFans, an online subscription-based platform hosting pornography and sexually explicit content uploaded by creators, MacKinnon writes about the allegations against OnlyFans of allowing rule-breaking content, such as content featuring minors or child sexual abuse, to pass their "inadequate screening process." Similar to the traditional pornography industry, MacKinnon asserts that it is impossible for websites like OnlyFans to know "whether pimps and traffickers are recruiting the unwary or vulnerable or desperate or coercing them offscreen and confiscating or skimming the proceeds, as is typical in the sex industry." MacKinnon also explores the concept of revenge porn and the possibility of pornographic material being sold on websites like OnlyFans without consent from the individual, which MacKinnon refers to as online sex trafficking.

=== Anti-pornography feminist organizations and campaigns ===
From the mid-1970s into the early 1980s, public rallies and marches protesting pornography and prostitution drew widespread support among women and men from across the political spectrum. Beginning in the late 1970s, anti-pornography radical feminists formed organizations such as Women Against Pornography, Women Against Violence in Pornography and Media, Women Against Violence Against Women, Feminists Fighting Pornography, and like groups that provided educational events, including slide-shows, speeches, guided tours of the sex shops in areas like New York's Times Square and San Francisco's Tenderloin District, petitioning, and publishing newsletters, in order to raise awareness of the content of pornography and the sexual subculture in pornography shops and live sex shows.

Similar groups also emerged in the United Kingdom, including legislatively focused groups such as Campaign Against Pornography and Campaign Against Pornography and Censorship, as well as groups associated with radical feminism such as Women Against Violence Against Women and its direct action offshoot Angry Women.

=== Legislative and judicial efforts ===
==== Anti-pornography Civil Rights Ordinance ====
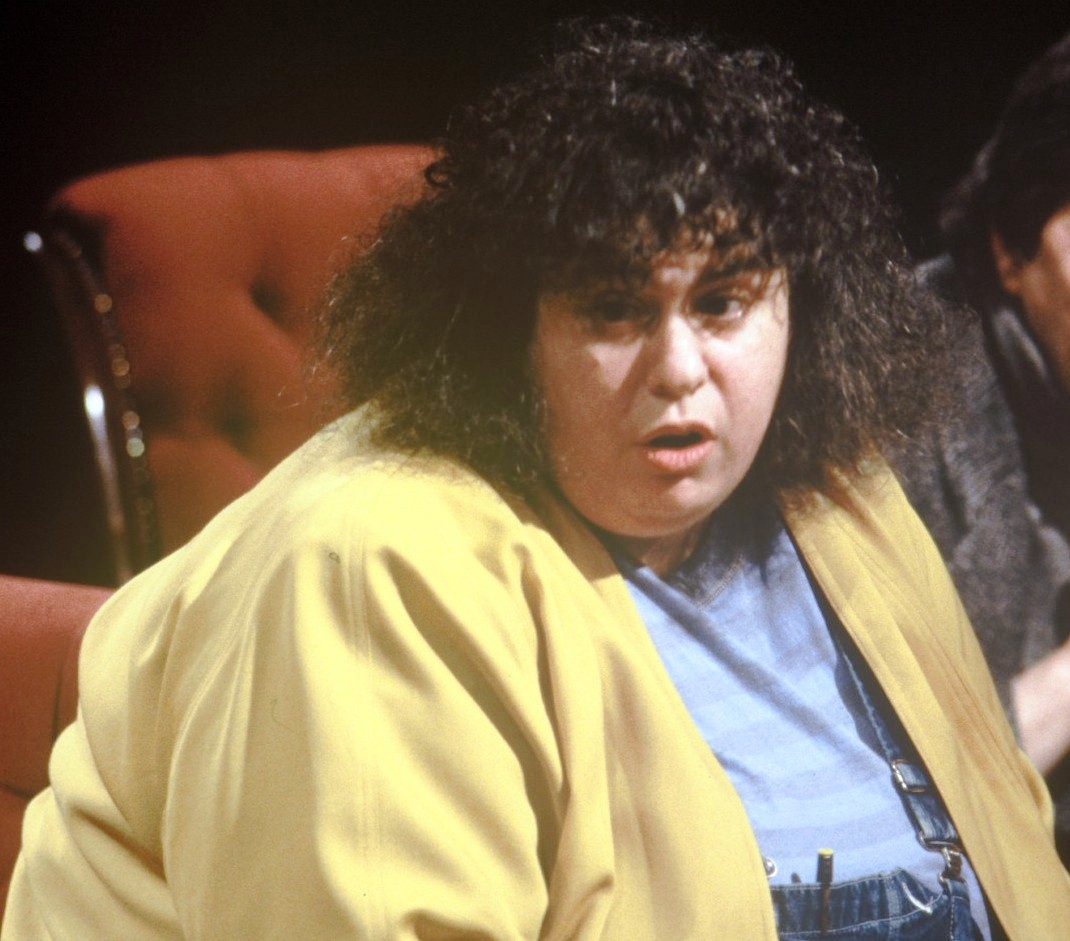
Andrea Dworkin in May 1988 on television

Many anti-pornography feminists—Dworkin and MacKinnon in particular—advocated laws which defined pornography as a civil rights harm and allowed women to sue pornographers in civil court. The Antipornography Civil Rights Ordinance that they drafted was passed twice by the Minneapolis city council in 1983, but vetoed by Mayor Donald M. Fraser, on the grounds that the law's constitutionality was questionable, citing first amendment concerns.

The ordinance was successfully passed in 1984 by the Indianapolis city council and signed by Mayor William Hudnut, and passed by a ballot initiative in Bellingham, Washington in 1988, but struck down both times as unconstitutional by the state and federal courts. In 1986, the Supreme Court affirmed the lower courts' rulings in the Indianapolis case without comment.

Many anti-pornography feminists supported the legislative efforts, but others objected that legislative campaigns would be rendered ineffectual by the courts, would violate principles of free speech, or would harm the anti-pornography movement by taking organizing energy away from education and direct action and entangling it in political squabbles.

Dworkin and MacKinnon responded to the alleged violation of free speech principles by pointing out that the Ordinance was designed with an explicit goal of preventing its misinterpretation and abuse for the purpose of censorship or discrimination against sexual minorities. Their co-authored publication, Pornography and Civil Rights: a New Day for Women's Equality, is a comprehensive description of the law with political analysis of the social conditions which, it argues, make it both appropriate and necessary. There is an explanation of its intended meaning and an articulation of the circumstances out of which they see the law being utilized civilly as a substantive remedy.

==== Pornography Victims' Compensation Act ====
Another feminist approach was designed to permit survivors of crime when the crime was the result of pornographic influence to sue the pornographers. The Pornography Victims' Compensation Act of 1991 (previously known as the Pornography Victims Protection Act) was supported by groups including Feminists Fighting Pornography. Catharine MacKinnon declined to support the legislation, though aspects of it were based on her legal approach to pornography. The bill was introduced in the United States Congress, thus, had it passed, it would have applied nationwide.

==== R. v. Butler ====
The Supreme Court of Canada's 1992 ruling in R. v. Butler (the Butler decision) fueled further controversy, when the court decided to incorporate some elements of Dworkin and MacKinnon's legal work on pornography into the existing Canadian obscenity law. In Butler the Court held that Canadian obscenity law violated Canadian citizens' rights to free speech under the Canadian Charter of Rights and Freedoms if enforced on grounds of morality or community standards of decency; but that obscenity law could be enforced constitutionally against some pornography on the basis of the Charter's guarantees of sex equality.

The Court's decision cited extensively from briefs prepared by the Women's Legal Education and Action Fund (LEAF), with MacKinnon's support and participation. Dworkin opposed LEAF's position, arguing that feminists should not support or attempt to reform criminal obscenity law.

==== Robinson v. Jacksonville Shipyards ====
Robinson v. Jacksonville Shipyards was a sexual harassment Federal district court (Middle District of Florida) case. It recognized as law that pornography could illegally contribute to sexual harassment through a workplace environment hostile to women. The court's order included a ban on "displaying pictures, posters, calendars, graffiti, objects, promotional materials, reading materials, or other materials that are sexually suggestive, sexually demeaning, or pornographic, or bringing into the JSI [the employer's] work environment or possessing any such material to read, display or view at work." It is not clear whether the decision was directly attributable to the anti-pornography feminist analysis, if the influence was indirect, or if the outcome was coincidental, but counsel Legal Momentum was historically associated with the National Organization for Women (NOW), a leading feminist organization, suggesting that counsel was likely to have had knowledge of the feminist theory.

==== Proposed Internet porn ban in Iceland ====
In 2013, though the production or sale of pornography was then already prohibited in Iceland, Minister of the Interior Ögmundur Jónasson proposed extending the ban to online pornography. Though the proposal was ultimately struck down by Icelandic Member of Parliament and free speech activist Birgitta Jónsdóttir, the ban was supported by many feminist groups including the Feminist Party of Germany, the London Feminist Network, the Coalition for a Feminist Agenda, and others. These groups claimed that legally limiting Internet pornography would promote violence prevention, proper sex education, and general public health.

== Sex-positive and anti-censorship feminist views ==
=== Sex-positive feminism ===
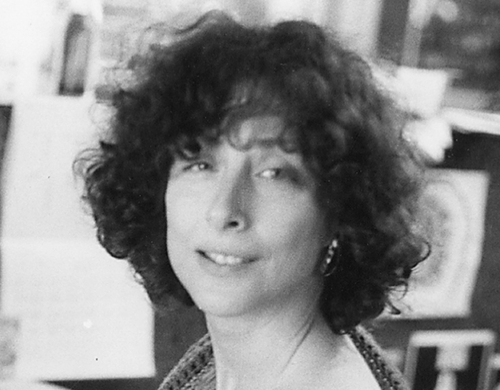
Ellen Willis

Feminists such as Betty Friedan and Kate Millett to Karen DeCrow, Wendy Kaminer and Jamaica Kincaid supported the right to consume pornography.

The onset of third-wave feminism in the mid-1990s saw a rise in sex positivism and sex-positive feminists, who sought to combat and subvert socially mandated ideals surrounding sexuality. Sex-positive feminism considers some of the broader implications that normative, hegemonic pornography has on women. According to sex blogger Clarisse Thorn, "[Women are] encouraged to be into sex in a very performative way […]. On the one hand, if we don't seem to enjoy sex in this very performative way, then we're seen as 'prudes'; at the same time, if we seem to enjoy sex too much then we're seen as 'sluts.'" According to some sex-positive feminists, anti-pornography feminist discourse ignores and trivializes women’s sexual agency. Ellen Willis (who coined the term "pro-sex feminism") states "As we saw it, the claim that 'pornography is violence against women' was code for the neo-Victorian idea that men want sex and women endure it." One potential consequence of normative discourses on women's sexuality can be seen in the orgasm gap, a term used to describe the discrepancy between men's and women's orgasms in heterosexual, partnered sex. Some research has found that up to 70% of women do not orgasm during heterosexual intercourse and that as many as 30% of unmarried women who are sexually active have never experienced an orgasm. Research has also found that the most significant predictor of women's orgasm is what women do during sex. In other words, women are not practicing the behaviours that bring them to orgasm during heterosexual intercourse, perhaps due to norms that are supported and reinforced by hegemonic pornography.

Although sex-positive feminists take a variety of views towards existing pornography, at the core of sex-positive feminism is the resistance of stigmas associated with female sexuality and advocacy for clear and enthusiastic consent. Many sex-positive feminists view pornography as subverting many traditional ideas about women's sexuality, such as ideas that women do not like sex generally, only enjoy sex in a relational context, or that women only enjoy vanilla sex. According to Johanna Schorn, sex-positive feminism aims to create a society in which sexuality "can be performed within a 'safe', 'healthy' and non-exploitative context." Thus, Schorn believes that the current structure that the pornography industry relies upon must be broken apart and allow for the acceptance and inclusion of narratives that have traditionally been ignored in porn. Sex-positive pornography sometimes shows women in sexually dominant roles and features women with a greater variety of body types than are typical of mainstream entertainment and fashion. Participation from a variety of women in these roles allows for a fulfillment of a multitude of sexual identities and free expression.

In some parts of the world, sex-positive feminism and the promotion of pornography as a form of free expression have become more mainstream. In France, Paris had its first three-day SNAP! (Sex Workers Narrative Art & Politics) festival in November, 2018. The festival worked to gain recognition of pornography and other sex work as art but also sought to acknowledge the political and controversial aspects.

=== Feminist critique of censorship ===
Many feminists regardless of their views on pornography are opposed on principle to censorship. Even the feminists who see pornography as a sexist institution, also see censorship (including MacKinnon's civil law approach) as an evil. In its mission statement, Feminists for Free Expression, founded in 1992 by Marcia Pally, argues that censorship has never reduced violence, but historically been used to silence women and stifle efforts for social change. They point to the birth control literature of Margaret Sanger, the feminist plays of Holly Hughes, and works like Our Bodies, Ourselves and The Well of Loneliness as examples of feminist sexual speech which has been the target of censorship. FFE further argues that the attempt to fix social problems through censorship, "divert[s] attention from the substantive causes of social ills and offer a cosmetic, dangerous 'quick fix.'" They argue that instead a free and vigorous marketplace of ideas is the best assurance for achieving feminist goals in a democratic society.

Critics of anti-pornography feminism accuse their counterparts of selective handling of social scientific evidence. Anti-pornography feminists are also critiqued as intolerant of sexual difference and is characterized as often indiscriminately supporting state censorship policy and are accused of complicity with conservative sexual politics and Christian Right groups.

Several feminist anti-censorship groups have actively opposed anti-pornography legislation and other forms of censorship. These groups have included the Feminist Anti-Censorship Taskforce (FACT) and Feminists for Free Expression in the US and Feminists Against Censorship in the UK.

Li Yinhe at the annual analysis of sex and gender events in December, 2011

Critique of censorship has become especially prevalent in China, where pornography is strictly prohibited, and the ownership or sale of pornographic materials can mean life in prison. Feminists like Li Yinhe openly oppose the censorship of pornography and advocate for its decriminalization. Looking to many western countries as an example, Yinhe emphasizes the importance of freedom of expression and cites the 35th article of the Constitution of China in declaring the right to pornography as a form of free speech.

Andrea Dworkin and Catharine MacKinnon responded with a statement claiming that the idea that anti-porn raids in Canada reflected the application of pre-Butler standards and that it was actually illegal under Butler to selectively target LGBT materials. However, opponents of Butler have countered that the decision simply reinforced an existing politics of censorship that pre-dated the decision.

Anti-censorship feminists question why only some forms of sexist communication (namely sexually arousing/explicit ones) should be banned, while not advocating bans against equally misogynist public discourse. Susie Bright notes, "It's a far different criticism to note that porn is sexist. So are all commercial media. That's like tasting several glasses of salt water and insisting only one of them is salty. The difference with porn is that it is people fucking, and we live in a world that cannot tolerate that image in public."

=== Feminist pornography ===
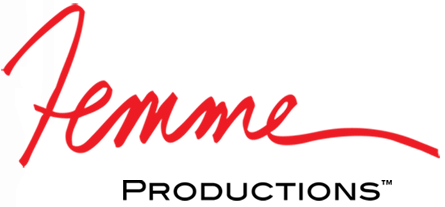
Femme Productions was founded by Candida Royalle in 1984.

Pornography produced by and with feminist women is a small, but growing segment of the porn industry. Feminist pornography attempts to address the perceived gaps in ethics found in mainstream pornography production. Feminist pornography "typically involves respect, proper pay, communication, safety, and consent for performers." According to Erika Lust, one difference between feminist porn and mainstream porn is that performers in feminist porn have the freedom to choose the intensity and the type of work they star in, while working in an environment that values communication and personal boundaries. Although feminist pornography operates with a different set of ethics than mainstream porn, feminist pornography is still produced under capitalism which means opportunities for exploitation are still present.

Some pornographic actresses such as Nina Hartley, Ovidie, Madison Young, and Sasha Grey are also self-described sex-positive feminists, and state that they do not see themselves as victims of sexism. They defend their decision to perform in pornography as freely chosen, and argue that much of what they do on camera is an expression of their sexuality. It has also been pointed out that in pornography, women generally earn more than their male counterparts.

Feminist porn directors include Candida Royalle, Tristan Taormino, Madison Young, Shine Louise Houston, and Erika Lust. Some of these directors make pornography specifically for a female or genderqueer audience, while others try for a broad appeal across genders and sexual orientations. Candida Royalle, founder of Femme Productions, thought of her work as "female-oriented, sensuously explicit cinema as opposed to formulaic hard-core pornographic films that [...] degraded women for the pleasure of men." Erika Lust, and her production company Lust Films, produce feminist porn with the message that female pleasure is important. Feminist porn directors like Candida Royalle and Erika Lust have produced content that is different from mainstream pornography by honouring women's sexuality.

Feminist curators such as Jasmin Hagendorfer organize feminist and queer porn film festivals (e.g. PFFV in Vienna).

According to Tristan Taormino, "Feminist porn both responds to dominant images with alternative ones and creates its own iconography." Erika Lust argues that everyone in the porn industry has their own ethical standards, and that the worldviews and values of the directors, screenwriters and producers are the key to how well performers are treated, and how desire, gender roles and agency are presented to consumers. According to Lust, 'ethics can also exist in the porn industry, and should be enforced'.

== Specific issues ==
=== Pornography vs. erotica ===
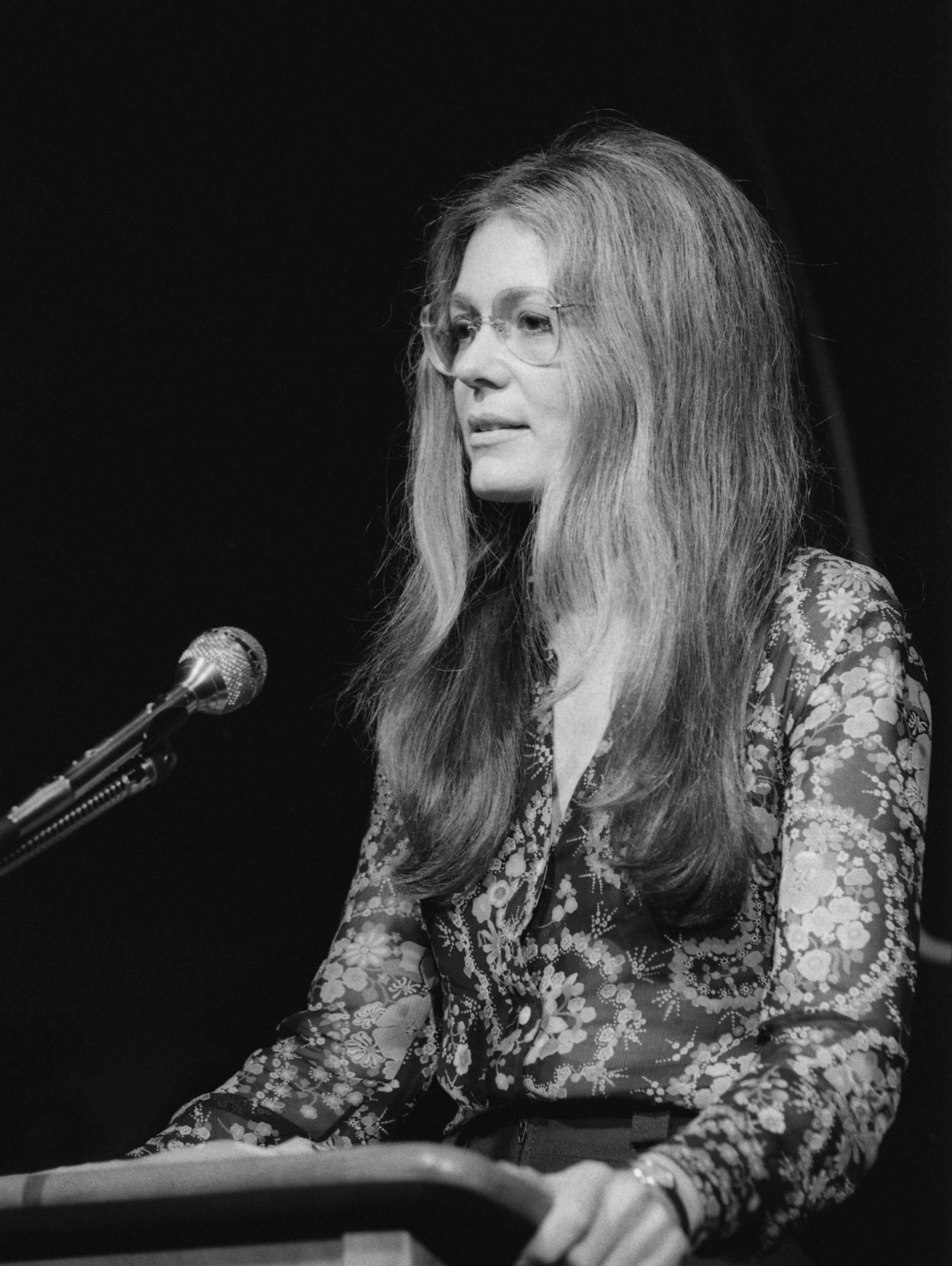
Gloria Steinem in 1975

Some anti-pornography feminists, such as Gloria Steinem and Page Mellish, distinguish between "pornography" and "erotica", as different classes of sexual media, the former emphasizing dominance and the latter emphasizing mutuality. Her 1978 essay "Erotica and Pornography: A Clear and Present Difference" was one of the first attempts to make this distinction on etymological grounds, and in her 1983 book Outrageous Acts and Everyday Rebellions, Steinem argues that, "These two sorts of images are as different as love is from rape, as dignity is from humiliation, as partnership is from slavery, as pleasure is from pain." Feminists who subscribe to this view hold that erotica promotes positive and pro-woman sexual values and does not carry the harmful effects of pornography.

Other anti-pornography feminists are more skeptical about this distinction, holding that all sexual materials produced in a patriarchal system are expressions of male dominance. Andrea Dworkin wrote, "erotica is simply high-class pornography: better produced, better conceived, better executed, better packaged, designed for a better class of consumer." Ellen Willis holds that the term 'erotica' is needlessly vague and euphemistic, and appeals to an idealized version of what kind of sex people should want rather than what arouses the sexual feelings people actually have. She also emphasizes the subjectivity of the distinction, stating, "In practice, attempts to sort out good erotica from bad porn inevitably comes down to 'What turns me on is erotica; what turns you on is pornographic.'" Pip Christmass (1996) commented: 'Gloria Steinem's well-known essay, "A Clear and Present Difference" (1978), articulates what many of us might like to think are the fundamental differences between the two; but as it has often been pointed out, erotica is sometimes indistinguishable from pornography in that it is no less predictable, formulaic, or repetitive than its less culturally acceptable counterpart. As many critics are beginning to suggest, the traditional cultural division between erotica (supposedly aimed at a primarily female market) and pornography (as a masturbatory aid for men) is somewhat simplified.'

Some feminists make an analogous distinction between mainstream pornography and feminist pornography, viewing mainstream pornography as problematic or even wholly misogynistic, while praising feminist pornography.

=== Sex workers ===
The work of feminist pornography includes studying women, children and men in the industry.

As for opposition, some feminists, such as Catharine MacKinnon, argue against pornography because it can be viewed as demeaning and degrading to women and men. Sheila Jeffreys argues that pornography is used by men as a guide to hate, abuse, and control women.

== Feminist pornographers ==
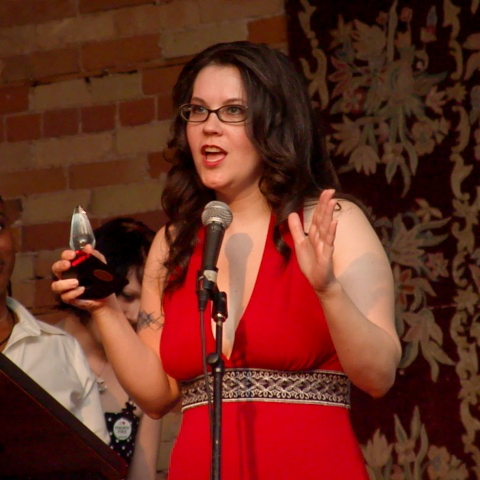
Tristan Taormino in 2007

In the 1970s and 1980s, Annie Sprinkle, Candida Royalle, and Nina Hartley were some of the first feminist-identified performers in the porn industry.

In 2002, Becky Goldberg produced the documentary "Hot and Bothered: Feminist Pornography," a look at women who direct, produce, and sell feminist porn. Feminist pornography is whenever the women is in control of the sexual situation, she is in control of what is being done to her and she enjoys it. Goldberg's views on feminism and pornography is, "if you don't see what you are looking for, make it yourself because chances are someone else wants to see that, too. Or if you can't find it at your local video store, demand it."

Courtney Trouble is a feminist performer and producer of queer porn. Her films feature "sexual and gender minorities." Trouble began in the business when she decided she did not see enough diversity in the business, and wanted to make a positive change.

Shine Louise Houston, owner of Pink and White Productions, produces porn that features and reflect different types of sexuality, different genders, and queer people of color.

Lorraine Hewitt is the creative director of the Feminist Porn Awards based in Toronto, Canada.

Tristan Taormino is both a sex educator and feminist pornographer who has helped produce films, written books, owns her own website and has published many articles on topics related to sexuality, gender and articles on sex positive relationships.

== See also ==
- Anarcha-feminism
- Choice feminism
- Conservative feminism
- Feminist art movement
- Feminist Porn Awards
- Feminist pornography
- Feminist perspectives on sex markets
- Gender equality
- Go Topless Day
- Individualist feminism
- Liberal feminism
- Libertarian feminism
- Me Too movement
- Sex-positive feminism
- Sexualization
- Women's erotica
- Women's pornography
