= Victim feminism =

Term used to critique certain forms of feminist activism

Victim feminism is a term that has been used by some conservative postfeminist writers such as Katie Roiphe and Naomi Wolf to critique forms of feminist activism which they see as reinforcing the idea that women are weak or lacking in agency.

== Roiphe, Wolf and "power feminism" ==
Self-described feminist Naomi Wolf uses the term victim feminism in her 1993 book Fire With Fire. Wolf contrasts victim feminism with power feminism. In her view, victim feminists present women as "beleaguered, fragile, intuitive angels" thus preventing women from taking responsibility for the power they actually have. Among various attributes of victim feminism, Wolf writes that it projects violence and competitiveness onto men or their patriarchy, while disregarding these qualities in women.

Religious scholar Colin Grant describes Wolf's power vs. victim dichotomy as being rooted in differences in how feminists address the liabilities that women suffer: while victim feminism simply dwells on them, power feminism seeks to identify them, with the purpose to challenge and overcome them. Grant also mentions that Wolf herself appears to have embraced both sides: her book The Beauty Myth seems to be from the victim feminism camp, but with Fire with Fire Wolf transitions to the power feminism side.

This dichotomy of "victim" vs "power" was criticized by other feminist scholars, such as Elizabeth M. Schneider, for being defined too broadly so that Wolf's argument became lost. In addition, it lumps together diverse and radically different feminist schools, and this confusion aids anti-feminists in their rhetoric.

Wolf's Fire With Fire and Katie Roiphe's The Morning After garnered considerable media attention. They formed part of a backlash against the perceived domination of the feminist theme of victimization in the contemporary popular culture. Victim feminism was viewed as a negative tendency by Wolf and those who built on her analysis. The more positive tendency recognizes the distinctiveness of women's experience and views (regarding sex, morality, etc.) as a positive alternative in contrast to that imposed by the "patriarchal" views of men.

One of Wolf's and Roiphe's arguments is that emphasis on victimization reinforces the stereotype of women being fragile and vulnerable. However, it was argued that their solution in the form of "power feminism" is simplistic, because it fails to take into an account the systemic nature of women's subordination. Overall, the "victim vs. power" dichotomy was described as false and fundamentally inadequate, and leading to "problematic extremes".

Schneider criticizes the dichotomy of feminism in the form of "victimhood vs. agency" from the legal standpoint, arguing that the view of women as either victims or agents is incomplete and static. She points out that, first, both concepts are too narrow and incomplete, and second, they are not the opposite poles of a spectrum, they are independent, but interrelated dimensions of women's experience.

== "Agency-affirming" feminism ==
Gender studies scholar Rebecca Stringer writes that besides Wolf and Roiphe, other feminist authors have criticized the representation of women as victims and promoted a brand of agency-affirming feminism. These include Mary Wollstonecraft, Camille Paglia, Christina Hoff Sommers, Natasha Walter, and Rene Denfeld. Each of these authors wrote popular books about feminism framed as calls to action, like works by Betty Friedan and Germaine Greer. According to Stringer, this trend of 1990s agitation against "victim feminism" is tied to the concurrent rise of neoliberalism. At the same time, in her book Knowing Victims Stringer argues that these critiques of "victim feminism" do not affirm women's agency, but rather problematize women's capacity for agency and declare a lack of women's personal responsibility, which is, in Stringer's view, akin to victim blaming.

== See also ==
- Antifeminism
- Gender equality
- List of feminist theories
