= Kathleen Barry =

American sociologist

- Born: January 22, 1941 (age 85)
- Awards: 1985 Wonder Woman Foundation Award

Academic background
- Education: University of California, Berkeley

Academic work
- Main interests: Co-founder of the Coalition Against Trafficking in Women (CATW)
- Notable works: Female Sexual Slavery

Kathleen Barry (born January 22, 1941) is an American sociologist and feminist. After researching and publishing books on international human sex trafficking, she co-founded the United Nations NGO, the Coalition Against Trafficking in Women (CATW). In 1985, she received the Wonder Woman Foundation Award for her strides towards the empowerment of women. She has taught at Brandeis University and Penn State University.

== Works ==
Barry's first book, Female Sexual Slavery (1979), prompted international awareness of human sex trafficking and has been translated into six languages. Her follow-up to Female Sexual Slavery, The Prostitution of Sexuality (1995) discusses the idea of "consent" in liberal modern American discourse, concluding that "every form of oppression is sustained" through apparent consent by the oppressed group or class to their exploitation. She further concludes that the normalization and acceptance of prostitution based on arguments of prostitutes' consent ignores the human-rights principle that violation cannot be consented to. She states that women, as members of an oppressed class under patriarchy, are compelled to "consent" to their own sexual exploitation by society, much in the way a Marxist would say workers are compelled to cooperate with their oppressors, the capitalists.

== Education ==
Barry has two Ph.Ds from the University of California, Berkeley, one in sociology and one in education.

== Bibliography ==
=== Books ===
- Female Sexual Slavery, 1979
- Vietnam's Women in Transition, 1995
- The Prostitution of Sexuality, 1995
- Susan B. Anthony: A Biography of a Singular Feminist, 2000
- Unmaking War, Remaking Men: How Empathy Can Reshape Our Politics, Our Soldiers and Ourselves, 2010

=== Other writings ===
- "The Vagina on Trial" (1971)
- — (1982). "On the History of Cultural Sadism". In Linden, Robin Ruth (ed.). Against Sadomasochism: A Radical Feminist Analysis. East Palo Alto, Calif.: Frog in the Well. pp. 51–65. ISBN 9780960362837.
- — (1980). "Beyond Pornography: From Defensive Politics to Creating a Vision". In Lederer, Laura (ed.). Take Back the Night: Women on Pornography. New York: W. Morrow. ISBN 978-0688037284.
- — (March 5–7, 1993). Keynote (Speech). Feminist Legal Perspectives on Pornography and Hate Propaganda.
- — (1995). "Pornography and Global Sexual Exploitation: A New Agenda for Feminist Human Rights". In Lederer, Laura; Delgado, Richard (eds.). The Price We Pay: The Case Against Racist Speech, Hate Propaganda, and Pornography. New York: Hill and Wang. ISBN 9780809015771.
- — (1996). "Deconstructing Deconstructionism (or, whatever happened to feminist studies?)" and "Pornography and the Global Sexual Exploitation of Women". In Bell, Diane; Klein, Renate (eds.). Radically Speaking: Feminism Reclaimed. North Melbourne, Vic: Spinifex Press. ISBN 9781875559381.
- — (November 3, 1999). "When Men Tell Women's History". Opinion. Chicago Tribune.
