= Index of feminism articles =

This is an index of articles related to the issue of feminism, women's liberation, the women's movement, and women's rights.

== A ==
Act, Pornography Victims Compensation - Activists, women's rights, list of - Advertising, sex in - Aid societies, ladies' or soldiers' - All-female band - Amazon feminism - Amendment, Equal Rights - Anarcha-feminism - Anthropology, feminist - Antifeminism - Anti-pornography feminism (compare Sex-positive feminism) - Archaeology, feminist - Archaeology, gender - Architecture, modern, feminism and - Art movement, feminist - Atheist feminism - Australia, women's suffrage in - Authors, ecofeminist, list of

== B ==
Bahrain, women's political rights in - BDSM, feminist views on - Bicycling and feminism - Binary, gender - Black feminism - Bonding, female - Bride burning - Bride kidnapping - Burning, bride

== C ==
Canada, women's rights in - Car, passenger, women-only - Chauvinism, female (compare Male chauvinism) - Chicana feminism - Christmas Letter, Open - Choice, pro- - Christian feminism - Cinema, women's - Colonial, post-, feminism - Comics, women in, portrayal of - Compensation Act, Pornography Victims - Composition studies, feminist theory in - Computing, women in - Consciousness raising - Conservative feminisms, list of - Constitution, United States, Nineteenth Amendment to the - Countries, timeline of first women's suffrage in majority-Muslim - Crime, gender and - Criminology, school of, feminist - Cult of Domesticity - Culture, feminism in - Cultural feminism - Cyberfeminism

== D ==
Day, International Women's - Dekh Le - Difference feminism - Differences, gender - Discrimination - Distinction, sex and gender - Domestic violence - Domesticity, Cult of

== E ==
Ecofeminism - Ecofeminist authors, list of - Economics, feminist - Education, female - Education, mixed-sex - Effects on society, feminist - Egalitarianism - Egypt, feminism in - Engineering, women in - English, gender neutrality in - English, women's writing in - English custom, wife selling - Equal pay for women - Equal Rights Amendment - ERA - Equality, feminism and - Equality feminism - Equality, gender - Equity feminism - Erotophilia - Erotophobia - Existentialism, feminist

== F ==
Family, matrifocal - Female bonding (compare Male bonding) - Female chauvinism (compare Male chauvinism) - Female education - Female privilege: see Male privilege) - Female superiority - Feminazi - Feminine psychology (compare Masculine psychology) - Femininity (compare Masculinity) - Feminisation of the workplace - Feminism (compare Masculism) - Feminism and equality - Feminism and modern architecture - Feminism and the Oedipus complex - Feminism in Australia - Feminism in culture - Feminism in Egypt - Feminism in France - Feminism in India - Feminism in international relations - Feminism in Japan - Feminism in Nepal - Feminism in Poland - Feminist anthropology - Feminist archaeology - Feminist art movement - Feminist art movement in the United States - Feminist economics - Feminist effects on society - Feminist existentialism - Feminist film theory - Feminist geography - Feminist history - Feminist history in the United Kingdom - Feminist history in the United States (see also Nineteenth Amendment to the United States Constitution) - Feminist legal theory - Feminist literary criticism - Feminist movement - Feminist movement in the United States - Feminist movements and ideologies - Feminist philosophy - Feminist political ecology - Feminist revisionist mythology - Feminist rhetoricians, list of - Feminist school of criminology - Feminist science fiction - Feminist Sex Wars - Feminist sexology - Feminist sociology - Feminist Studies - Feminist theology - Feminist theory - Feminist theory in composition studies - Feminist therapy - Feminist views on BDSM - Feminist views on pornography - Feminist views on prostitution - Feminist views on sexuality - Feminist views on transgender topics - Feminists, list of - Feminists and the Spanish Civil War - Feminization of poverty - Fiction, women's - Film theory, feminist - Fiction, science, feminist - Fiction, science, women in - First-wave feminism - First women's suffrage in majority-Muslim countries, timeline of - Fourth-wave feminism in Spain - First World War, women in the - France, feminism in - Francoist Spain and the democratic transition period, feminism in - French structuralist feminism

== G ==
Gender and crime - Gender archaeology - Gender binary - Gender differences - Gender equality - Gender history - Gender identity - Gender inequality - Gender mainstreaming - Gender-neutral language - Gender neutrality in English - Gender performativity - Gender role - Gender roles in Islam - Gender, sex and, distinction - Gender, sociology of - Gender-specific job title - Gender studies - Gendercide - Gendered division of labour - Geography, feminist - Geology, women in - Girl Power - Girls, women, and information technology - Girly girl - Glass ceiling - Global feminism - Grrrl, riot - Gynarchy - Gynocentrism (compare Androcentrism) - Gynocracy (compare Androcracy) - Gynocriticism - Gynophobia

== H ==
Harassment, sexual - Health, women's (compare Men's health) - Herstory (compare History) - Hikes, Suffrage - History, feminist - History, gender - History in the United Kingdom, feminist - History in the United States, feminist (see also Nineteenth Amendment to the United States Constitution) - History, in, legal rights of women - History of feminism - History of women in the military - History of women in the United States - History, women's - History Month, Women's - Husband-selling

== I ==
Identity, gender - Ideologies, feminist movements and - Income disparity - Income disparity in the United States, male-female - Income inequality in the United States - India, feminism in - Individualist feminism (also Libertarian feminism) - Inequality, gender - Information technology, women, and girls - International relations, feminism in - International Women's Day - International Women's Year - Islam, gender roles in - Islam, women and - Islamic feminism

== J ==
Japan, feminism in - Japan, women's suffrage in - Jewish feminism - Job title, gender-specific - Journalism and media professions, women in

== K ==
Kidnapping, bride - Kuwait, women's suffrage in

== L ==
Labour, gendered division of - Ladies' aid societies - Language, gender-neutral - Led, women-, uprisings - Left, the, and feminism - Legal rights of women in history - Legal theory, feminist - Lesbian - Lesbian Sex Wars - Letter, Open Christmas - Liberal feminism - Liberation, women's (compare Men's liberation) - Life, pro-, feminism - Lipstick feminism - List of conservative feminisms - List of ecofeminist authors - List of feminist rhetoricians - List of feminists - List of suffragists and suffragettes - List of women's rights activists - List of women's studies journals - Literary criticism, feminist

== M ==
Mainstreaming, gender - Majority-Muslim countries, timeline of first women's suffrage in - Male-female income disparity in the United States - Marianismo (compare Machismo) - Marxist feminism - Material feminism - Maternalism (compare Paternalism) - Matriarchy (compare Patriarchy) - Matrifocal family - Matrilineal succession (compare Patrilineal succession) - Matrilineality (compare Patrilineality) - Matrilocal residence (compare Patrilocal residence) - Media professions, journalism and, women in - Medicine, women in (compare Men in nursing) - Men and feminism - Military, history of women in the - Millie Tant - Misogyny (compare Misandry, Philandry, Philogyny) - Mixed-sex education - Modern architecture, feminism and - Modern, post-, feminism - Month, History, Women's - Motherhood, sociology of (compare Sociology of fatherhood) - Mother's rights (compare Father's rights) - Movement, feminist - Movement in the United States, feminist - Movement, women's (compare Men's movement) - Movements and ideologies, feminist - Muliebrity (compare Virility) - Music, women's - Muslim, majority-, countries, timeline of first women's suffrage in - Mythology, feminist revisionist

== N ==
Nepal, feminism in - New feminism (also Catholic feminism) - New Woman - New Zealand, timeline of feminist art in - Nineteenth Amendment to the United States Constitution)

== O ==
Objectification - Objectification, sexual - Occupational sexism - Oedipus complex, feminism and - Open Christmas Letter

== P ==
Passenger car, women-only - Patriarchy - Pay, equal, for women - Performativity, gender - Philosophy, feminist - Philosophy, women in - Philandry (compare Philogyny, Misandry, Misogyny) - Philogyny - Pink-collar worker - Playgirl - Poland, feminism and - Political ecology, feminist - Political rights in Bahrain, women's - Politics, women in - Porn wars - Pornography, anti-, feminism (compare Sex-positive feminism) - Pornography, feminist views on - Pornography Victims Compensation Act - Portrayal of women in comics - Postcolonial feminism - Postmodern feminism - Poverty, feminization - Privilege: see Male privilege - Pro-choice - Pro-feminism - Pro-life feminism - Prostitution, feminist views on - Protective laws - Protofeminism - Psychology, feminine (compare Masculine psychology)

== Q ==
Queer studies - Queer theory

== R ==
Radical feminism - Red Tent Meetings - Reproductive justice - Reproductive rights - Republican motherhood - Residence, matrilocal (compare Patrilocal residence) - Revisionist mythology, feminist - Revolution, sexual - Rhetoricians, feminist, list of - Rights activists, women's, list of - Rights Amendment, Equal - Rights, legal, of women in history - Rights (other than voting), women's, timeline of - Rights, political, in Bahrain, women's - Rights, women's (compare Men's rights) - Rights in Canada, women's - Riot grrrl - Role, gender - Roles in the World Wars, women's -R/Feminism

== S ==
Science fiction, feminist - Science, women in - Science fiction, women in - Second-wave feminism - Segregation, sex - Selling, husband- - Selling, wife - Selling, wife, English custom - Separatist feminism - Sex and gender distinction - Sex in advertising - Sex-positive feminism (compare Anti-pornography feminism) - Sex segregation - Sex wars, feminist - Sexism - Sexology, feminist - Sexual harassment - Sexual objectification - Sexual revolution - Sexuality, feminist views on - Sexualization (as a political term) - Shelter, women's (compare Men's shelter) - Socialist feminism - Societies, ladies' aid or soldiers' aid - Society, effects on, feminist - Sociology, feminist - Sociology of gender - Sociology of motherhood (compare Sociology of fatherhood) - Soldiers' aid societies - Standpoint feminism - Standpoint theory - State feminism - Structuralist feminism, French - Studies, Feminist - Succession, matrilineal (compare Patrilineal succession) - Suffrage - Suffrage, women's - Suffrage Hikes - Suffrage, women's, in Switzerland - Suffrage, women's, timeline of - Suffrage, women's, timeline in majority-Muslim countries - Suffrage in Australia, women's - Suffrage in Japan, women's - Suffrage in Kuwait, women's - Suffrage in Switzerland, women's - Suffrage in the United Kingdom, women's - Suffrage in the United States, women's - Suffragette - Suffragists and suffragettes, list of

== T ==
Tant, Millie - Thealogy - Theology, feminist - Theology, womanist - Theory, feminist - Therapy, feminist - Third-wave feminism - Timeline of first women's suffrage in majority-Muslim countries - Timeline of women's suffrage - Timeline of women's rights (other than voting) - Tomboy - Transfeminism - Transgender topics, feminist views on - Transnational feminism - Trophy wife

== U ==
United Kingdom, women's suffrage in the - United States Constitution, Nineteenth Amendment to the - United States, feminist movement in the - United States, income disparity in the, male-female - United States, women in the, history of - United States, women's suffrage in the - Uprisings, women-led

== V ==
V-Day - Vésuviennes - Victims Compensation Act, Pornography - Victorian era, women in the - Views, feminist, on BDSM - Views, feminist, on prostitution - Views, feminist, on sexuality - Views, feminist, on transgender topics - Views on pornography, feminist - Violence against women - Violence, domestic

== W ==
Waves of feminism - Wave, first-, feminism - Wave, second-, feminism - Wave, third-, feminism - Wife selling - Wife selling (English custom) - Wife, trophy - Woman question, the - Womanism - Womanist theology - Women and Islam - Women in comics, portrayal of - Women in computing - Women in engineering - Women in World War I - Women in geology - Women in journalism and media professions - Women in medicine (compare Men in nursing) - Women in military, history of - Women in philosophy - Women in politics - Women in science - Women in science fiction - Women in the First World War - Women in the military, history of - Women in the United States, history of - Women in the Victorian era - Women in the workforce - Women in United States, history of - Women in World War I - Women-only passenger car - Women's cinema - Women's Day, International - Women's Equal Rights Law of Israel (1951) - Women's fiction - Women's health (compare Men's health) - Women's history - Women's History Month - Women's liberation (compare Men's liberation) - Women's movement (compare Men's movement) - Women's music - Women's political rights in Bahrain - Women's rights (compare Men's rights) - Women's rights (other than voting), timeline of - Women's rights activists, list of - Women's rights in Canada - Women's roles in the World Wars - Women's shelter (compare Men's shelter) - Women's studies (compare Men's studies) - Women's suffrage - Women's suffrage in Australia - Women's suffrage in Japan - Women's suffrage in Kuwait - Women's suffrage in Switzerland - Women's suffrage in the United Kingdom - Women's suffrage in the United States - Women's suffrage, first, in majority-Muslim countries, timeline of - Women's suffrage, timeline of - Women's writing in English - Women's Year, International - Women, girls, and information technology - Wimmin - Womyn - Worker, pink-collar - Workforce, women in the - Workplace, feminisation of the - World War I, women in the - World Wars, women's roles in the - Writing in English, women's - Women-led uprisings

== Y ==
Year, International Women's
