= Feminist effects on society =

Cultural and legal impact of feminist activism

The feminist movement has effected change in Western society, including women's suffrage; greater access to education; more equitable pay with men; the right to initiate divorce proceedings; the right of women to make individual decisions regarding pregnancy (including access to contraceptives and abortion); and the right to own property.

Harvard Psychology Professor Steven Pinker argues that feminism has reduced domestic violence against men as their likelihood of being killed by a female intimate partner has decreased six-fold. However, fourth-wave feminism has coincided with significant increases in male violence and femicides against women, a lot of it regarded as a backlash.

== Women's rights ==
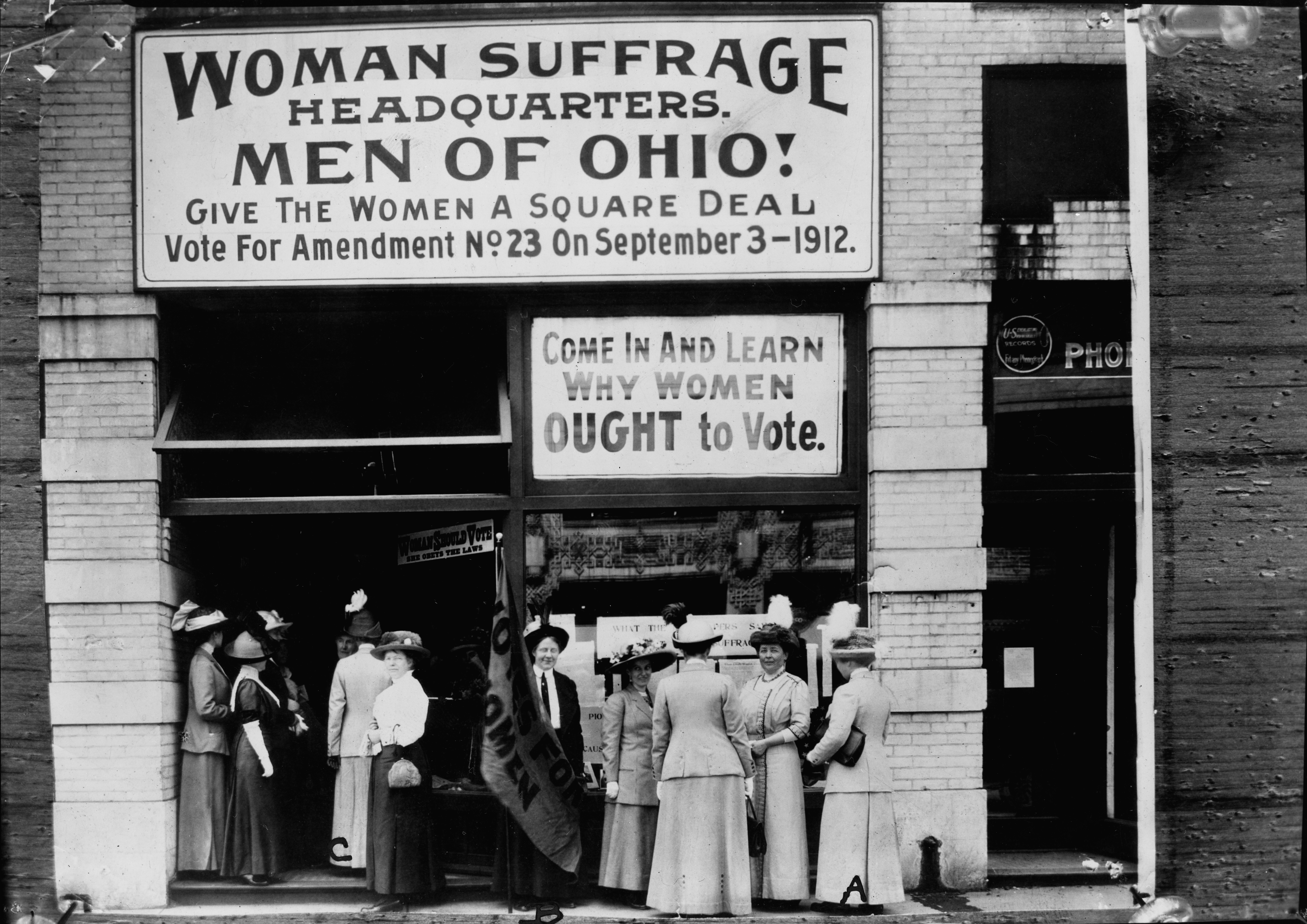
Woman Suffrage Headquarters, Cleveland, 1912

From the 1960s on, the women's liberation movement campaigned for women's rights, including the same pay as men, equal rights in law, and the freedom to plan their families. Their efforts were met with mixed results. Issues commonly associated with notions of women's rights include, though are not limited to, the right to bodily integrity and autonomy; to vote (universal suffrage); to hold public office; to work; to fair wages or equal pay; to own property; to education; to serve in the military; to enter into legal contracts; and to have marital, parental, and religious rights. Feminists have worked to protect women and girls from child sexual abuse, challenging the prior belief that girls caused men to have sex with them even when the girls were very young.

In the UK, a public groundswell of opinion in favour of legal equality gained pace, including during the modern movement, partly through the extensive employment of women in men's traditional roles during both world wars. By the 1960s, the legislative process was being readied, tracing through MP Willie Hamilton's select committee report, his Equal Pay for Equal Work Bill, the creation of a Sex Discrimination Board, Lady Sear's draft sex anti-discrimination bill, and a government Green Paper of 1973, until 1975 when the first British Sex Discrimination Act, an Equal Pay Act, and an Equal Opportunities Commission came into force. With encouragement from the UK government, the other countries of the EEC soon followed suit with an agreement to ensure that discriminatory laws would be phased out across the European Community.

In the U.S., the National Organization for Women (NOW) was created in 1966 to bring about equality for all women. NOW was one important group that fought for the Equal Rights Amendment (ERA). This amendment stated that "Equality" of rights under the law shall not be denied or abridged by the United States or any state on account of sex." But there was disagreement on how the proposed amendment would be understood. Supporters believed it would guarantee women equal treatment. But critics feared it might deny women the right to be financially supported by their husbands. It died in 1982 because not enough states had ratified it. ERAs have been introduced in subsequent Congresses, but have failed to be passed. Nonetheless, various laws advancing women's rights were promulgated, although many issues remained to be resolved.

In the final three decades of the 20th century, Western women knew a new freedom through birth control, which enabled them to plan their adult lives, often making way for both careers and families. The movement had been started in the 1910s by U.S. pioneering social reformer Margaret Sanger and in the UK and internationally by Marie Stopes.

Publication of data and advocacy relevant to rights increased in recent decades. For example, the United Nations Human Development Report 2004 estimated that, on average, women work more than men when both paid employment and unpaid household tasks are accounted for. In rural areas of selected developing countries, women performed an average of 20 per cent more work than men, or an additional 102 minutes per day. In the OECD countries surveyed, on average women performed 5 per cent more work than men or 20 minutes per day when both paid employment and unpaid household tasks are taken into account.

== International law ==
=== CEDAW ===
The Convention on the Elimination of All Forms of Discrimination Against Women (CEDAW) is an international convention adopted by the United Nations General Assembly. Described as an international bill of rights for women, it came into force on 3 September 1981. Several countries have ratified the Convention subject to certain declarations, reservations, and objections. Iran, Sudan, Somalia, Qatar, Nauru, Palau, Tonga, and the United States have not ratified CEDAW. Expecting a U.S. Senate vote, NOW has encouraged President Obama to remove U.S. reservations and objections added in 2002 before the vote. The CEDAW does not protect men from any form of discrimination.

== Reproductive rights ==
In the U.S., a major focus of political activism has centered on reproductive rights, including for (and, among opponents, against) the decision by the U.S. Supreme Court in the case of Roe v. Wade enunciating a Constitutional right for a woman to choose whether to carry a pregnancy to term. However, on June 24, 2022, the Supreme Court overruled Roe in Dobbs v. Jackson Women's Health Organization on the grounds that the right to abortion was not "deeply rooted in this Nation's history or tradition", nor considered a right when the Due Process Clause was ratified in 1868, and was unknown in U.S. law until Roe.

== Gender-neutral language ==
Gender-neutral English is a description of language usages which do not recognize gender and are aimed at minimizing assumptions regarding the biological sex of human referents. The advocacy of gender-neutral language reflects, at least, two different agendas: one to clarify the inclusion of both sexes or genders (gender-inclusive language); the other that gender, as a category, is rarely worth marking in language (gender-neutral language). Gender-neutral language is sometimes described as non-sexist language by advocates and politically correct language by opponents.

== Heterosexual family relationships ==
The increased entry of women into the workplace beginning in the twentieth century has affected gender roles and the division of labor within households. Sociologist Arlie Russell Hochschild in The Second Shift and The Time Bind presented evidence that, in two-career couples, men and women, on average, spend about equal amounts of time working, but women still spend more time on housework. Feminist writer Cathy Young responds to Hochschild's assertions by arguing that, in some cases, women may prevent the equal participation of men in housework and parenting.

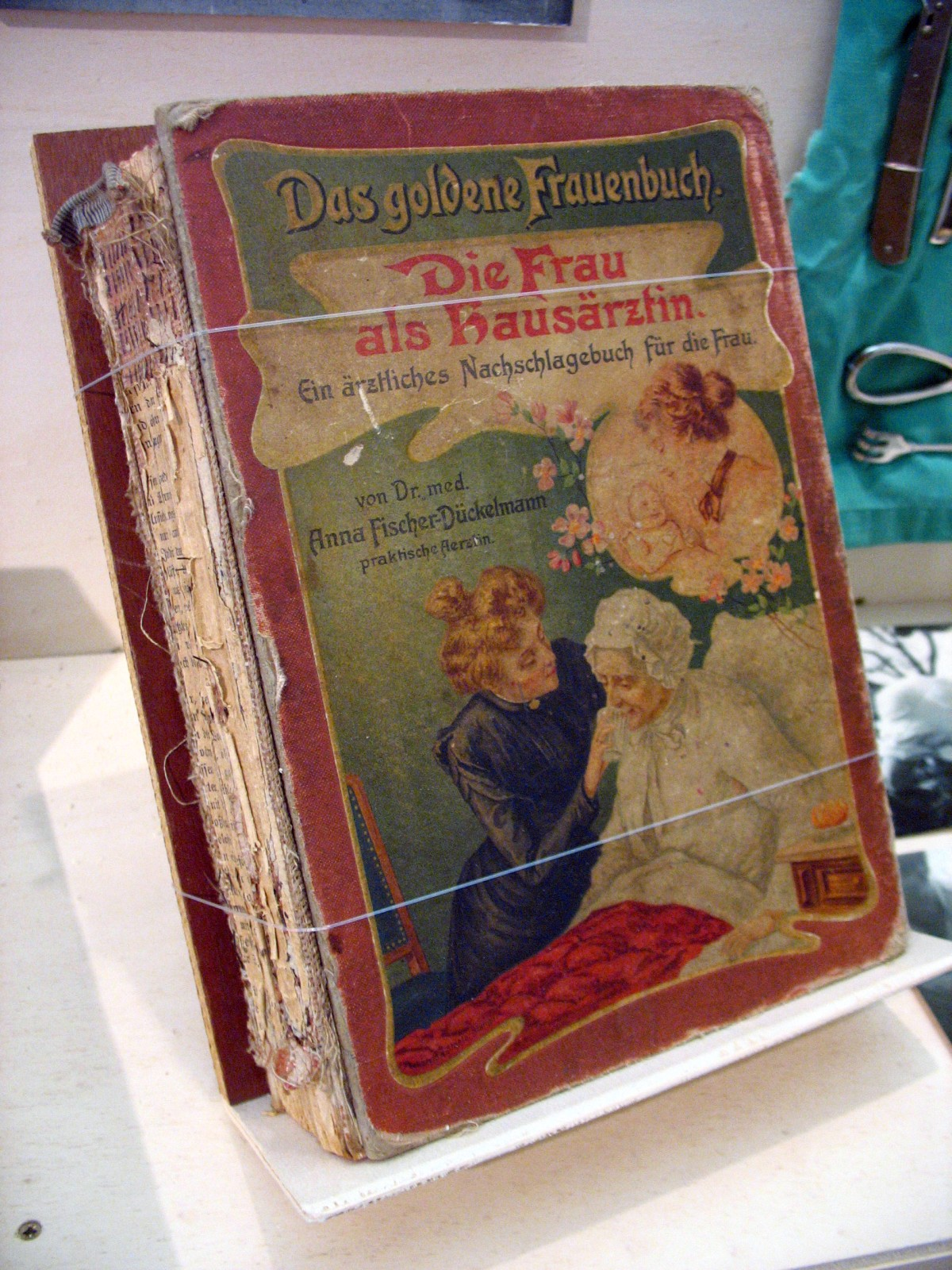
"The Woman as Family Doctor," traditional form of home care

Feminist criticisms of men's contributions to child care and domestic labor in the Western middle class are typically centered on the idea that it is unfair for women to be expected to perform more than half of a household's domestic work and child care when both members of the relationship also work outside the home. Several studies provide statistical evidence that the financial income of married men does not affect their rate of attending to household duties.

In Dubious Conceptions, Kristin Luker discusses the effect of feminism on teenage women's choices to bear children, both in and out of wedlock. She says that as childbearing out of wedlock has become more socially acceptable, young women, especially poor young women, while not bearing children at a higher rate than in the 1950s, now see less of a reason to get married before having children. Her explanation for this is that the economic prospects for poor men are slim, hence poor women have a low chance of finding a husband who will be able to provide reliable financial support.

Although research suggests that, to an extent, both women and men perceive feminism to be in conflict with romance, studies of undergraduates and older adults have shown that feminism has positive impacts on relationship health for women and sexual satisfaction for men, and found no support for negative stereotypes of feminists. However, this contradicts Luker's statement that young women from poorer backgrounds now see less reason to get married before having children.

== Religion ==
Feminist theology reconsiders the traditions, practices, texts, and theologies of religions from a feminist perspective. Its goals include increasing the role of women among the clergy and religious authorities, reinterpreting male-dominated imagery and language about the deity or deities, determining women's place in relation to career and motherhood, and studying images of women in the religion's sacred texts. Difference feminism offers compatibility with gender-differentiating teachings of many major theologies, although difference feminism, when essentialist, is itself controversial.

Christian feminism is a branch of feminist theology which seeks to interpret and understand Christianity in light of the equality of women and men. Because this equality has been historically ignored, Christian feminists believe their contributions are necessary for a complete understanding of Christianity. While there is no standard set of beliefs among Christian feminists, most agree that God does not discriminate on the basis of biologically determined characteristics such as sex. Their major issues are the ordination of women, male dominance in Christian marriage, and claims of moral deficiency and inferiority of abilities of women compared to men. They also are concerned with the balance of parenting between mothers and fathers and the overall treatment of women in the church. New feminism is a branch of difference feminism situated within Catholicism.

Islamic feminism is concerned with the role of women in Islam and aims for the full equality of all Muslims, regardless of gender, in public and private life. Islamic feminists advocate women's rights, gender equality, and social justice grounded in an Islamic framework. Although rooted in Islam, the movement's pioneers have also utilized secular and Western feminist discourses and recognize the role of Islamic feminism as part of an integrated global feminist movement. Advocates of the movement seek to highlight the deeply rooted teachings of equality in the Quran and encourage a questioning of the patriarchal interpretation of Islamic teaching through the Quran, hadith (sayings of Muhammad), and sharia (law) towards the creation of a more equal and just society.

Jewish feminism is a movement that seeks to improve the religious, legal, and social status of women within Judaism and to open up new opportunities for religious experience and leadership for Jewish women. Feminist movements, with varying approaches and successes, have opened up within all major branches of Judaism. In its modern form, the movement can be traced to the early 1970s in the United States. According to Judith Plaskow, who has focused on feminism in Reform Judaism, the main issues for early Jewish feminists in these movements were the exclusion from the all-male prayer group or minyan, the exemption from positive time-bound mitzvot, and women's inability to function as witnesses and to initiate divorce.

The Dianic Wicca or Wiccan feminism is a female-focused and Goddess-centered Wiccan faith that is also known as a feminist religion that teaches witchcraft as every woman's right. It is also one faith of the many practiced in Wicca.

Atheist feminism advocates the equality of men and women within atheism. Atheist feminists also oppose religion, being a major source of female oppression and inequality, believing that all religions are sexist and oppressive to women.

=== Theology ===
Feminist theology, sometimes referred to as the Goddess movement, is a movement found in several religions to reconsider the traditions, practices, scriptures, and theologies of those religions from a feminist perspective. Some of the goals of feminist theology include increasing the role of women among the clergy and religious authorities, reinterpreting male-dominated imagery and language about the deity or deities, determining women's place in relation to career and motherhood, and studying images of women in the religion's sacred texts. In Wicca, "the Goddess" is a deity of prime importance, along with her consort the Horned God. In the earliest Wiccan publications, she is described as a tribal goddess of the witch community, neither omnipotent nor universal, and it was recognised that there was a greater "Prime Mover", although the witches did not concern themselves much with this being.
