= Husband selling =

Practice of a wife selling her husband

Husband selling was the historical practice of: a wife selling a husband, generally to a new wife; an enslaver or enslaver's estate selling the husband in an enslaved family, generally to a new enslaver; court-sentenced sales of fathers' services for some years, described as sales of fathers (one apparently a husband;) sales of a husband as directed by a religious authority.

== Sales by wives ==
Intermaritally, no more than five or six cases of husbands having been sold by their wives are known in English and English diasporan history, in comparison to approximately 400 reportable cases of wives having been sold by their husbands in the English custom. The known sales of husbands by wives occurred in the 19th century.

In the intermarital context, the practice was somewhat but not entirely parallel to wife selling in the same nation. On the one hand, in both practices, the person was sold by the current spouse to a new spouse, causing a divorce with the seller and creating a new marriage with the buyer. Sales sometimes used a contract but never ritualistically, as far as is known. It is possible that the law and the response of courts to cases were the same regardless of gender.

== Sales by enslaver and their estates ==
In the enslaver context, in Philadelphia, in ca. the 18th century, sales often occurred not only by or at the direction of living enslavers but also at the direction of testators. Testators were not known to direct that slave couples be kept together. "Philadelphia newspaper advertisements ... provide evidence that many [slave] owners sold husbands away from wives ...; most indicated no concern about the consequences for the slaves." Some sales of slave husbands without their wives were followed by the masters requiring the wives to take new husbands.

An enslaved woman, according to Daniel Meaders, "married [a slave] ..., but soon after the marriage, the 'husband was sold and sent away. I never saw him afterwards.'".

In Virginia, in 1772–1773, a Baptist church considered a complaint against an individual that the selling of a slave husband, causing separation from his wife, was un-Christian, a matter which the county judiciary would not decide.

One case in Massachusetts was alleged in 1799 against a political candidate but denied by the candidate.

In Haiti, when it was St. Domingue, a law of 1685 on slavery forbade "selling a [slave] husband or wife separately."

In Colombia under Spanish colonial rule, particularly in 1750–1826, according to David L. Chandler, Spanish law "allowed slaves to marry and establish a family even against the master's wishes ... and prohibited ... [the family's] separation through sale.... [S]eparation of the slave family was not very common." If a slave couple was broken up by the sale of one spouse out of an area, Chandler wrote, the other spouse, even after ten years, could petition a court to allow the latter enslaved person to find a buyer so the couple could reunite; such cases, in which the wife was sold first and the husband second, were litigated in 1802 and 1806. In 1808, reported Chandler, an enslaver had sold an enslaved husband to another enslaver; the husband objected to a breakup of his family, and a court ordered visitations; after a subsequent dispute between the enslaved and the selling enslaver, the enslaver who sold the husband "brought suit against the new owner ... to force her either to sell him out of the area or to sell him back to ... [the first master] so he could properly discipline and control" the slave-husband but was ordered by a court to sell the enslaved wife to the other enslaver as well, so the slave family would be able to live together and not merely have visits; and the court order was complied with.

== Sales at religious direction ==
The hatred of a wife was a ground for forcing a sale of the husband into slavery. In the medieval Christian Church, according to Frederik Pijper in 1909, "if anyone abandoned his wife, and refusing to come to terms with her, permitted himself to be put into prison for debtors, he became a slave forever on the ground of his hatred for his wife. And should he be seen at any time enjoying liberty, he must again be sold."

In the same Church, according to Pijper, "one way [to "become a slave"] was by selling oneself because of poverty. It might so happen that a married pair sank into such need that the husband was compelled to sell himself, and did so with his wife's consent. In this way he secured sustenance for himself, and with the purchase-money he was in a position to keep his wife from starving.... A synod at Paris early in the seventh century ordained that freemen who had sold ... themselves should if they repaid the money at once be restored to their former status. To demand back a greater sum than what had been paid for them, was not allowed."

A church decision at Vermeria in the 8th century, according to Pijper, specified that if an enslaved husband was sold, both spouses should be discouraged from remarrying; "if through sale a slave be separated from his wife, also a slave, each should be urged to remain thus (i. e., not to marry again) in case we cannot reunite them."

If a married enslaved person's freedom was not bought, i.e., the married enslaved person was not sold into freedom, the enslaved person's already-freed spouse could remarry, under permission of the medieval Church, if one enslaver had wedded the former couple; according to Pijper, "if ... two slaves were joined in wedlock by their common master, and one of them was thereafter freed, that one was permitted to marry again, if the freedom of the other could not be bought."

== Popular culture ==
In popular culture, a wife's sale of her husband to a widow is depicted in 1960 in a play by François Billetdoux, Le Comportement des époux Bredburry (sic), and the playwright claimed to have seen such an advertisement in "an American paper". Indigenous Sufi folk-poetry told of "the foolish queen Lila who, for the sake of a fabulous necklace, 'sold' her husband to her maid for a night", thereby requiring purification for the Queen.

== See also ==
- Child-selling
- Human trafficking
- Wife selling, for a worldwide overview
