= Feminist sociology =

Subdiscipline of sociology

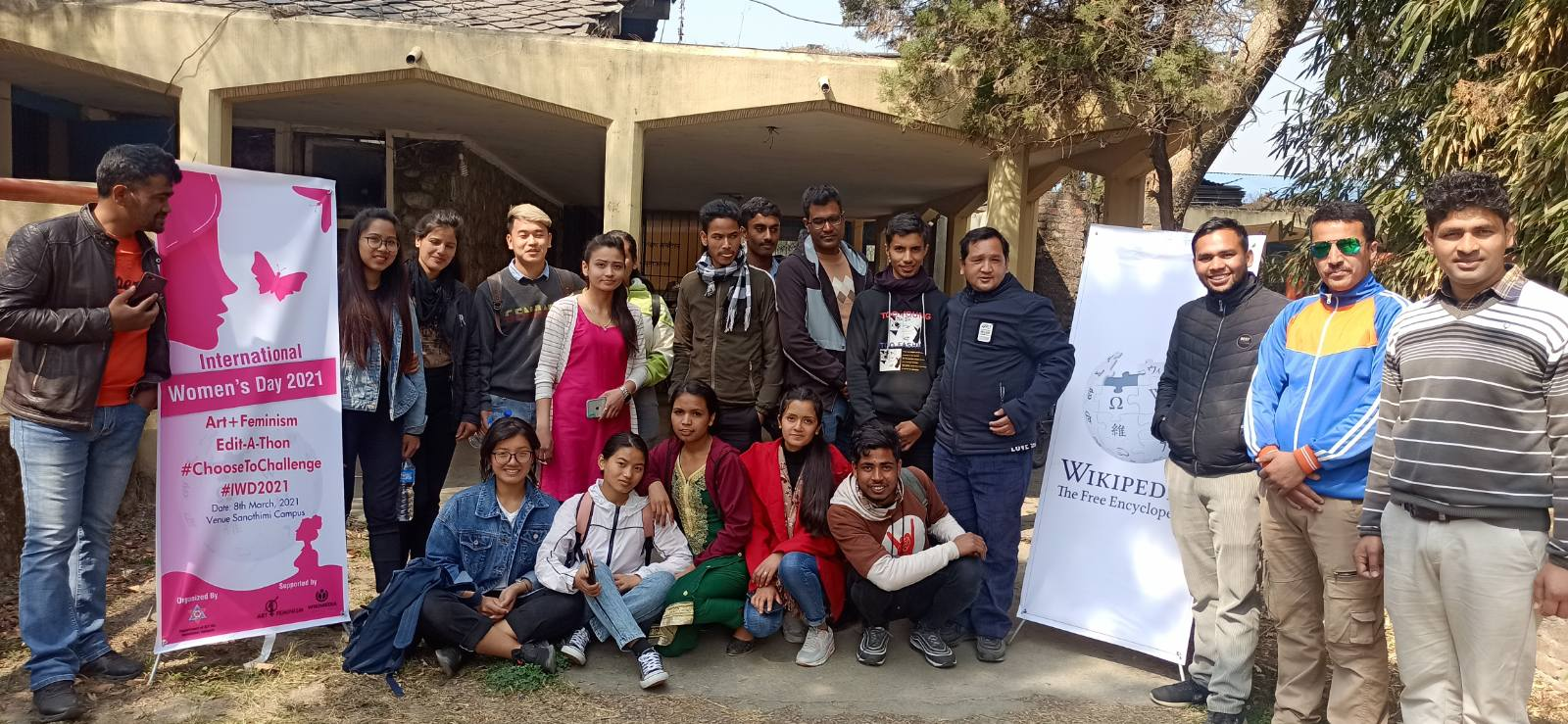
Art + Feminism Edit-A-Thon 2021 at Sanothimi Campus, Tribuwan University, Nepal

Feminist sociology is an interdisciplinary exploration of gender and power throughout society. Here, it uses conflict theory and theoretical perspectives to observe gender in its relation to power, both at the level of face-to-face interaction and reflexivity within social structures at large. Focuses include sexual orientation, race, economic status, and nationality.

== History ==
Charlotte Perkins Gilman's (1860–1935) work helped formalize feminist theory during the 1960s. Growing up, she went against traditional holds that were placed on her by society by focusing on reading and learning concepts different from women who were taught to be housewives. Her main focus was on gender inequality between men and women along with gender roles placed on by society. Where men go to work secure proper income for the family while women stay at home and tend to the family along with household chores. She "emphasized how differential socialization leads to gender inequality", but she did agree that biologically there is a difference between those born with female and male parts.

Parts of her research involved a theoretical orientation of a multidimensional approach to gender and discusses it more in depth in her book Women and Economics. Due to gender roles she believed that women pretended to live a certain life to avoid achieving their full potential living the role of a housewife. This is an example of a neurological theory, as developed by Sigmund Freud, which is cultivated using a psychoanalysis process called conscious and subconscious state of mind. The specific example given would be considered falling under false consciousness instead of the consciousness that helps control our daily lives. Leading the belief that women are viewed as property of their husbands, economically women were still dependent on husbands to provide financial support to themselves and their family. Gilman argued furthermore that the traditional division of labor was not biologically driven, but instead forced upon women based on the structure of society since before the nineteenth century. Society played a big role for women and their actions in their daily lives.

Gilman described this as a sociobiological tragedy because women are disregarded as being part of the ideology of "survival of the fittest". Instead, females are thought to be soft and weak individuals who are only good for productive purposes, and who are depicted as emotional and frail beings born to serve their husbands, children, and family without living for themselves. Gilman conducted her research at a time when women engaged in science were unheard of and when women were barred from voting. Her research helped create a ripple effect, along with that of other female sociologists, that helped pave the way for feminism and concepts related to feminist theory.

The study of sociology had been mostly androcentric up until the 1970s, when sociological thinking began to shift to focus on women. In 1963s, the Equal Pay Act, signed into law by John F. Kennedy, outlawed the wage disparity based on sex (Grady). The Equal Pay Act was one of the first ways that the United States began to shift its mentality about women's rights, how women should be treated in the workplace, and in society at large. While the Equal Pay Act focused solely on equal pay for equal work regardless of sex, Title VII of the 1964 Civil Rights Act was passed in a fight against discrimination of any kind in the workplace.

A major form of discrimination many women face in the workplace is sexual harassment. Sexual harassment is a form of illegal discrimination based on an abuse of power which can range from "inappropriate jokes" to "outright sexual assault" and more (Conley 312). While sexual harassment is not a form of discrimination uniquely faced by women, when it occurs in the workplace it often involves the subordination of women by a male superior or coworker. In the 1970s, many women fought for the right to dictate what happens to their body, such as establishing legal abortions, as well as making forced sterilization illegal (Grady). This shifted how Americans saw women, and the country began changing to allow women to have more control over their bodies.

Starting in the early 1990s, several instances of sexual harassment and abuse became well known and started a push for women to open about their own encounters with harassment. The allegations by Anita Young that Justice Clarence Thomas had sexually harassed her was one of these instances. After Thomas was confirmed as a justice on the Supreme Court regardless of these allegations, more women began to speak out. In surveys taken after the hearings, it was reported that "between 40 and 65 percent of women claim to have experienced sexual harassment on the job" (Sapiro). This social shift led to a change in attitude over bodily autonomy, and boundaries within the workplace, and throughout life. Beginning in the mid-1990s, women began to come forward with sexual harassment complaints and sexual assault allegations against their male counterparts, which led to a movement of drastically increased numbers of women taking a stance against sexual violence, leading to society recognizing there is a fundamental problem concerning sexual harassment (Grady). This, in turn, led to another movement in recent years called the "Me Too Movement" that led many women to coming forward with their own stories and encounters, showing that sexual harassment affects women across the world.

== Feminism and race ==
Many feminist sociologists argue that the intersectionality of women, especially when it comes to race, can no longer be ignored by the growing feminist movement. Due to the increase in popularity of this outlook, there has been a rise of transnational feminists stressing the idea that feminism should not be seen as an exclusively Western-centric idea, but that it must be able to adapt in order to incorporate the context and complications of individual cultures and traditions. The relationship between feminism and race was largely overlooked until the second wave of feminists produced greater literature on the topic of 'black feminism'. The second wave of feminists incorporated a "new feminist theory" known as including race, gender, and class to explain the oppression women of color face. This intersectionalist approach on feminist sociology allows for a type of "marriage" between the "gender/race/class dynamic", rather than excluding individuals of different races, ethnicities, nationalities, social classes, gender, sexual orientation, or any other factors. Women who suffer from oppression due to race may find themselves in a double bind.

Historically, the feminist movement, and the sociological feminist movement, has been led by middle and upper-class women from predominantly white backgrounds, causing the social trends of the movement to largely pass over the issues faced by women who do not fit into these tropes. This disregarding of the issues of intersectional women throughout the history of the feminist movement is due largely to the ignorance of the issues that these women face, and the assumption that the problems of white women within middle and upper-class homes are the problems of all women.

An ongoing debate in portions of transnational feminism surrounds the question of "solidarity", specifically as regards the general representation of women of the Global South. The question has been posed by a movement opposing the single minded outlook of second wave feminism, called Third World feminism. Because feminist movements are primarily led and operated by Western women who have sought to define themselves "in relation to 'other' more oppressed women from non-Western countries." Consequently, this has rendered women from the Global South "mere objects of their systems and institutions, victims of this never changing primitive force known as culture", effectively erasing their struggles only to be "replaced instead by the voices of Western feminists who want to save them."

However, several African American women within the field of feminist theory have been crucial in revolutionizing the field in which they work. An instrumental contribution to the field was Kimberlé Crenshaw's seminal 1989 paper, "Demarginalizing the Intersection of Race and Sex: A Black Feminist Critique of Antidiscrimination Doctrine, Feminist Theory and Antiracist Politics" (Crenshaw 1989). In it, she outlines the manner in which black women have been erased from feminist pedagogy. Black women must be understood as having multiple identities that intersect and reinforce one another, the two key experiences of being black and of being women. Furthermore, black women suffer on both racist and sexist fronts, marginalized not only by larger systems of oppression but by existing feminist discourse that disregards their intersectionality. Crenshaw's work is integral to understanding feminist sociology, as it advocated for black feminist thought and set the building blocks for future feminist sociologists such as Patricia Hill Collins.

Anna Julia Cooper and Ida Bell Wells-Barnett are African American women who were instrumental in conducting much research and making valuable contributions in the field of black feminism. Cooper and Wells-Barnett both consciously drew on their lived experiences as African American women to develop a "systematic consciousness of society and social relations". As such, these women foreshadow the development of a feminist sociological theory based in the interests of women of colour.

== Feminism and stratification ==
There are different models that attempt to describe the relationship between gender and stratification. One model is the sex-differences model which discusses the differences in behavior and attitude when called on the labels of male and female. Further, it is attempting to locate the true difference when all "socialization is removed". The inequalities that exist are due to many of the processes that are essential in normal socialization. However, these processes are removed. Another model is the sex-roles model which employs socialization, rather than ignoring it, to attempt to uncover the differences in gender and how people choose to identify to discover gender roles. Some sociologists do not agree with this sex-roles approach because it does not fall under the normal sociological "understanding of social roles". This is because most express a connection between oneself and other people. However, the sex-roles approach discusses two "polarized and internally persistent sets of predispositions". Most "theorists of gender do not agree on any one comprehensive theory of stratification". Also, "feminist analyses have developed gender parallels to the critiques of models of race that fail to address inequality as a function of something other than "difference". There are many different sociologists who argue that gender is organized "differently for Whites and Blacks" within race. These theorists continue to argue that gender also significantly impacts race differently for men and women. Similarly, gender also impacts the organization of class and class impacts the organization of gender.

== Feminism and gender ==
Historically, feminism has been a traditionally feminine role in America, and being a feminist has had a negative connotation toward it, at least in 1848 when the First-wave feminism started. Women who are feminists have been called "ugly" "men haters" or "always angry". These stereotypes only are associated with women, because it is not common in the U.S. for men to be feminists as well. The feminist movement started as a way to grant gender equality to women, but it is not limited to only women. Men can also be feminists if they believe that women deserve equal rights as well. Gender is a social construct derived from norms that society has implemented; based on how they believe a male or female would represent themselves. The third wave of feminism started the notion of connecting racial, sexual, and gender identities. Gender can be different for most people, and it does not have to fall in line with an individual's biological sex as well. It is up to interpretation, feminism and the way an individual chooses to be a feminist can be up for interpretation as well. Women having feminine manners was brought to light as gender tried to explain why men and women are treated unequally positions of power; and leads to misogynistic views of calling women "weak" because "femininity is a female flaw". The words used to describe women that are used as an insult are a compliment to men. For example, if a woman is assertive, aggressive, or bold, she is labeled as bossy. Feminists have continuously tried shifting away from the narrative that men cannot be feminists, and that being feminine is for women. Research has shown that men have participated in creating change and respecting feminist movements.

== Feminism and queer theory ==
Modern queer theory attempts to unmake the social and contextual elements reinforcing heteronormativity by challenging oppressive institutions on traditional binary distinctions between male and female, among its many other criticisms. In this regard, feminism and queer theory address the same ways social structures violently categorize and erase women and LGBTQIA+ people from the social narrative. However, sociological feminism often reinforces the gender binary through the research process "as the gendered subject is made the object of the study" (McCann 2016, 229). Queer theory, by comparison, challenges the traditional ideas of gender through the deconstruction and lack of acceptance of a dichotomy of male and female traits. In her recent work "Epistemology of the Subject: Queer Theory's Challenge to Feminist Sociology", McCann confronts the theoretical perspective and methodology of feminist sociology:"[the subject] rarely reflects the fluid, unstable, and dynamic realities of bodies and experiences. To "settle" on a subject category, then, is to reinscribe a fixity that excludes some, often in violent ways (for example, those who are literally erased because their bodies do not conform to a discrete binary)" (McCann 2016, 231-232). There can be a refashioning of the field, where extending boundaries to include queer theory would "develop new and innovative theoretical approaches to research...[and] address inequality within society" (McCann 2016, 237).

== Feminist critiques of multiculturalism ==
Debates within ethnic relations, particularly regarding the opposing perspectives of assimilationism and multiculturalism, have led to the accusation that feminism is incompatible with multiculturalist policy.

Feminists have many critics who are in favor of the idea of multiculturalism. These critics believe that feminists should not push their views on other cultures because it forces western ideas on others. Feminists around the world argue that men are mistreating women in other countries, but the male elites around that world would justify their infringement on women's rights by passing it off as part of their culture (Moller Okin). People with feminist ideals do not care about the backlash they get from world leaders and other countries. They believe that violations of women's rights should be prohibited all around the world, and their mission is to rid all cultural excuses for women's oppression (Moller Okin).

The remit of multiculturalism is to allow distinct cultures to reside in Western societies, or separate societies in general, and one possible consequence is that certain religious or traditional practices may negate Western feminist ideals. Central debates include the topics of arranged marriage and female genital mutilation. Others have argued that these debates stem from Western orientalism and general political reluctance to accept foreign migrants.

=== Types of feminism ===
- Anarcha-feminism
- Liberal feminism
- Cultural feminism
- Feminist existentialism
- Ecofeminism
- Radical feminism
- Marxist feminism
- Sex-positive feminism
- Socialist feminism
- Psychoanalytic feminism
- Postmodern feminism
- Black feminism
- Islamic feminism

== Criticism of feminist sociology ==
Feminism has had its fair share of criticism from both men and women. The support for feminist ideas is higher than the set-identification of being a feminist. There is a tendency in media for feminists to be ported negatively. Feminists "are less often associated with day-to-day work/leisure activities of regular women." Feminists have a negative portrayal because men and women belief they are trying to place women at the top of everything.

There are feminists such as Jean Bethke Elshtain, Daphne Patai, and Camille Paglia who oppose certain aspects of feminism. They are all opposed to the elevation of woman's interests above men's because it is the opposite of what feminism stands for. They also believe radical feminism is harmful to men and women because it pits both groups against each other. Daphne Patai argues the term "anti-feminist" is used as a way to push away feminism in academic debates.

=== Anti-feminism ===
Anti-feminism is opposition to feminism in some or all of its forms.

Anti-feminism has been around since the 19th century and was primarily focused on the opposition of women's suffrage. Woman were encouraged to be assigned proper places in the public realm while avoiding other realms such as political spheres altogether. It was later discussed by antifeminists that women did not have a place in institutions of higher education because it was too high of a physical burden for women to handle. There were also arguments against women's right to join labor unions, entry into the labor force, sit on juries, birth control and control of their sexuality. It was not until 1975 the Supreme Court decided that women had the right to be selected for jury duty.
