= Feminist existentialism =

Feminist movement

Feminism is a collection of movements aimed at defining, establishing, and defending equal political, economic, and social rights for women. Existentialism is a philosophical and cultural movement which holds that the starting point of philosophical thinking must be the individual and the experiences of the individual, that moral thinking and scientific thinking together are not sufficient for understanding all of human existence, and, therefore, that a further set of categories, governed by the norm of authenticity, is necessary to understand human existence. (Authenticity, in the context of existentialism, is to recognize the responsibility we have for our existence.) This philosophy analyzes relationships between the individual and things, or other human beings, and how they limit or condition choice.

Existentialist feminists emphasize concepts such as freedom, interpersonal relationships, and the experience of living as a human body. They value the capacity for radical change, but recognize that factors such as self-deception and the anxiety caused by the possibility of change can limit it. Many are dedicated to exposing and undermining socially imposed gender roles and cultural constructs limiting women's self-determination, and criticize post-structuralist feminists who deny the intrinsic freedom of individual women. A woman who makes considered choices regarding her way of life and suffers the anxiety associated with that freedom, isolation, or nonconformity, yet remains free, demonstrates the tenets of existentialism. The novels of Kate Chopin, Doris Lessing, Joan Didion, Margaret Atwood, and Margaret Drabble include such existential heroines.

== Major existential feminists ==
Simone de Beauvoir was a renowned existentialist and one of the principal founders of second-wave feminism. Beauvoir examined women's subordinate role as the 'Other', patriarchally forced into immanence in her book, The Second Sex, which some claim to be the culmination of her existential ethics. The book includes the famous line, "One is not born but becomes a woman," introducing what has come to be called the sex-gender distinction. Beauvoir's The Second Sex provided the vocabulary for analyzing the social constructions of femininity and the structure for critiquing those constructions, which was used as a liberating tool by attending to the ways in which patriarchal structures used sexual difference to deprive women of the intrinsic freedom of their "can do" bodies. Some say Beauvoir is farther reaching than Sartre despite often being overlooked in many comprehensive works about existentialist feminism.

Jean-Paul Sartre was a French philosopher, existentialist and phenomenologist who contributed greatly to existential feminism through works like Existential Psychoanalysis. In this work, Sartre claims that the individual is the intersection of universal schemata and he rejects the idea of a pure individual.

Maurice Merleau-Ponty was another French philosopher who contributed many existential works to the field. Many following theorists, such as Judith Butler, critiqued his methods, including his sexual ideology. Other theorists omit him, viewing him as a "Sartre knock-off".

Judith Butler is a modern feminist philosopher who has been influenced by Simone de Beauvoir's work in The Second Sex and The Ethics of Ambiguity. While Beauvoir understands subjectivity in existential terms as retaining a capacity for transcendence even within socially imposed roles, Butler argues that the subject itself is constituted within structures of power and does not exist independently of them. A common theme in Butler's writing is that of vulnerability, and how one is vulnerable to society itself. This vulnerability is a core part of the human experience, according to Butler.

== The body as a situation ==
The concept of the "body as a situation" is a cornerstone of feminist existentialism. This phrase was first used in Simone de Beauvoir's The Second Sex and then expanded upon by contemporary phenomenologists. The phrase describes the notion that the body is not merely a biological object or a fixed essence. Instead, it is the fundamental medium through which an individual engages with the world and exercises freedom. In particular, Beauvoir describes the body as a person's grasp on the world and a sketch for their projects. This perspective challenges biological determinism by suggesting that while biological facts are real, they only gain meaning through the social and ontological context in which they are lived.

Modern scholars such as Toril Moi and Iris Marion Young have refined this by exploring how patriarchal situations inhibit the bodily intentionality of women. Young's influential work utilizes the phenomenology of Maurice Merleau-Ponty to describe how women are often socialized to experience their bodies as fragile objects rather than active subjects. This results in "inhibited intentionality," where a woman may physically perceive her capacity to act but feels socially or psychologically constrained from doing so. Consequently, the female body can become a site of "immanence" restricted to being an object for others rather than a vehicle for "transcendence" into the world.

Furthermore, the situation of the body is increasingly understood through an intersectional lens. Scholars argue that the existential experience of the body cannot be separated from race, disability, or age. For instance, the situation of a Black woman's body involves navigating specific historical and social gaze structures that differ from those of a white woman. This section of the field seeks to deconstruct the universal human subject often found in early existentialism. It replaces that concept with a situated subject whose freedom is always negotiated through specific physical and social realities.

== Existential ethics and care ==
Existentialist feminism extends beyond individual freedom to address the ethical responsibilities inherent in human relationships. While early critics often viewed existentialism as overly individualistic, feminist theorists like Linda Bell and Hazel Barnes argued that a true commitment to one's own freedom necessitates a commitment to the freedom of others. This is rooted in the "ethics of ambiguity." In this framework, the realization of one's own subjectivity requires the recognition of the "Other" as a free subject rather than an object.

This ethical framework often intersects with the "ethics of care," though existentialists emphasize authenticity over traditional moral roles. Existential ethics suggests that moral choices must be made without the crutch of universal laws or "bad faith," which is the denial of one's own freedom. For a feminist, this means rejecting the socially imposed duty of womanhood. An example is the expectation of being inherently nurturing. Instead, the individual must choose care as an authentic project. As Beauvoir noted, to will oneself free is also to will others free. This creates a bridge between the personal struggle for autonomy and the collective struggle for political liberation.

In recent years, this has evolved into feminist existential phenomenology. This subfield looks at the ethical implications of "intersubjectivity." Theorists examine how the "Look" can be transformative rather than just alienating. By moving away from the idea that other people are necessarily a source of conflict, feminist existentialists propose that humans find their most authentic selves through meaningful and reciprocal relationships. This ethical turn emphasizes that freedom is not an isolated state but a social practice. It requires dismantling the structures of oppression that deny individuals the ability to project themselves into the future.

== Critiques ==
=== Simone de Beauvoir ===
Some critiques of the field are of Beauvoir and her portrayal of existentialist feminism specifically. Gwendolyn Dolske critiques that Beauvoir is inconsistent between her works, noting that the women in Beauvoir's fictional works resign to cultural norms rather than conquering their Otherness. Margaret A. Simons critiques Beauvoir's inability to transfer her work in theory into praxis.

=== Critiques against sexism ===
However, most of the critiques are of the limitations of the field overall. Margery Collins and Christine Pierce fault Sartre's limited anti-essentialism for his sexist views which Hazel Barnes then refutes. Maryellen MacGuigan criticizes Ortega's view of women's inferiority, Julia Maria's sexuate condition, and Frederick Buyendijk's narrative of women's experience.

=== Extension to gender and race studies ===
Jo-Ann Pilardi outlines the female eroticism in Beauvoir's work and Julien Murphy compares the gaze or look in Sartre to Adrienne Rich. Nancy Potter aligns female incest survivors' experiences with dread and anxiety. Janice McLane uses Merleau-Ponty's Concept of flesh to describe self-mutilation. Shannon Sullivan criticizes Merleau-Ponty's anonymous body. Linda Bell moves Sartre's notion of authenticity from feminist existentialism to feminist ethics. T. Denean Sharpley-Whiting uses Fanon's analyses of racist and colonized subjectivities to discuss feminism.
