= Philogyny =

Fondness, love or admiration of women

Philogyny is love of, admiration for, or respect for women or girls. It is the antonym of misogyny. It is a form of philanthropy and philosophy that empowers and celebrates women at an equal status as men, thus dismantling the social roles of patriarchy and supremacy. Philogyny has been widely practiced for thousands of years. It is reflected in art, literature, human societal structure, historical events, mythology, philosophy, and spiritualism worldwide.

An example of philogyny is women's empowerment, the promotion of women, #hypewomen, which includes domestic bliss by equal share of household responsibilities and, in its most greatest possible forms, philogynist stability, female sovereignty, autonomy and dignity. Philogyny also often operates through financial, economic and political advancement, affirmative action, quotas, equal representation in government, science based research and psychological techniques aimed at empowering women, and by legally or socially including women of all the benefits of full citizenship. In all cases, philogyny rewards women for accepting an equal, equitable and sovereign status.

Philogyny can be understood both as an attitude held by individuals and as a widespread cultural custom or system. Sometimes philogyny manifests in obvious and bold ways; other times it is more subtle or disguised in ways that are not recognized as such. In feminist thought, philogyny also includes the acceptance of feminine and “unfeminine” qualities. It holds in respect institutions, work, hobbies, or habits associated with women.

It accepts any aspects of women that are seen as feminine or unmanly, as well as any attributes seen as unwomanly or masculine because of the acknowledgement that previously women used the techniques to break into certain elements of society unavailable to them. Racism and other prejudices are dismantled when we focus on philogyny.

Philogyny is not to be confused with gynephilia, which is sexual attraction to women or femininity.

== Historical usage ==
=== Classical Greece ===
One of the earliest examples of philogyny is the poet Sappho who was an Archaic Greek poet from the island of Lesbos. Sappho is known for her lyric poetry, written to be sung while accompanied by a lyre. In ancient times, Sappho was widely regarded as one of the greatest lyric poets and was given names such as the "Tenth Muse" and "The Poetess". Sappho was a prolific poet, probably composing around 10,000 lines. Her poetry was well-known and greatly admired through much of antiquity, and she was among the canon of Nine Lyric Poets most highly esteemed by scholars of Hellenistic Alexandria. Sappho's poetry is still considered extraordinary and her works continue to influence other writers. Beyond her poetry, she is well known as a symbol of love and desire between women, with the English words sapphic and lesbian being derived from her own name and the name of her home island respectively. Whilst her importance as a poet is confirmed from the earliest times, all interpretations of her work have been coloured and influenced by discussions of her sexuality. Most of Sappho's poetry is now lost, and what is extant has mostly survived in fragmentary form; two notable exceptions are the "Ode to Aphrodite" and the Tithonus poem.

Christian Groes-Green has argued that the conceptual content of philogyny must be developed as an alternative to the concept of misogyny. Criticizing R.W. Connell's theory of hegemonic masculinities he shows how philogynous masculinities play out among youth in Maputo, Mozambique.

== Etymology ==
Philogyny comes from philo- (loving) and Greek gynē (woman). The parallel Greek-based terms with respect to men (males) are philandry for "fondness of men" and misandry for "hatred of men". Parallel terms for humanity generally are philanthropy and misanthropy.

== See also ==
- Androphilia and gynephilia
- Gynocentrism
- Gynophobia
