= Millie Tant =

Publication information
- Publisher: Viz

Millicent "Millie" Buckridge Tant is a fictional comic strip character in the British comic Viz.

She is a caricature of a left-wing militant feminist. She thinks of herself as a champion of "wimmin's" rights but is often self-centred and dismissive of the feelings of others. She rants, raises her fist in the air and foams at the mouth. She often refers to men as "phallocrats" and "potential rapists" or just "rapists", referring to other women as "fellow lesbians" regardless of their sexual orientation. Most of the storylines seem to indicate sexual frustration.

She often complains that various phenomena are metaphors for the suppression of women: fireworks are "big explosive penises" that "skewer and rape the virgin female sky". She refuses to make a snowman, instead offering to make a snow-black-lesbian-rape-victim-in-a-wheelchair. She plays cards with an old woman and ends the game by calling her a homophobe because she said "straight flush". In the end she often forgets her feminist stance and is shown asking a man to get rid of a mouse while she is standing on a chair, or knitting baby clothes.
