= God and gender =

God and gender may refer to:

- Gender of God
- Gender in Bible translation
- Gender and religion
