= Feminist revisionist mythology =

Literature informed by feminist literary criticism

Feminist revisionist mythology is feminist literature informed by feminist literary criticism, or by the politics of feminism more broadly and that engages with mythology, fairy tales, religion, or other areas.

== Overview ==
Lisa Tuttle has defined feminist theory as asking "new questions of old texts". She cites the goals of feminist criticism as (1) developing and uncovering a female tradition of writing, (2) interpreting symbolism of women's writing so that it will not be lost or ignored by the male point of view, (3) rediscovering old texts, (4) analyzing women writers and their writings from a female perspective, (5) resisting sexism in literature, and (6) increasing awareness of the sexual politics of language and style. Feminist revisionist mythology tends to fulfill at least one of these goals. Instead of just studying prior works though, it is the revision of old texts to create new ones.

Revision Mythmaking is a strategic revisionist use of gender imagery and is a means of exploring and attempting to transform the self and the culture or, in other words, to "subvert and transform the life and literature women poets inherit".

Alicia Ostriker states in her essay "Stealing the Language" that "we cannot measure the work of women poets, past or present, without a thorough--and if possible demystified-- awareness of the critical context in which they have composed and continued to compose their work. We need to recognize that our customary literary language is systematically gendered in ways that influence what we approve and disapprove of, making it extremely difficult for us to acknowledge certain kinds of originality--of difference--in women poets". "The belief that true poetry is genderless—which is a disguised form of believing that true poetry is masculine—means that we have not learned to see women poets generically, to recognize the tradition they belong to, or discuss either the limitation or the strengths of that tradition".

== Methods ==
Authors have used multiple methods of revising myths, including retelling them entirely from the point of view of the main female character, recreating the story in a way that attempts to break down the treatment of women as inactive objects, and telling the story with a feminist narrator who satirically pokes fun at the flawed view of women in the original text.

"Fables are centuries old and were devised to carry a moral lesson, such as Aesop's Fables. Suniti Namjoshi's eloquent and knowledgeable 'Blue Donkey' stories draw on this classic tradition of having beasts or mythical birds able to speak and act like humans but the 'Blue Donkey' provides ironic comment rather than a moral lesson. Angela Carter has rewritten fairy tales from the point of view of the heroine. In her collection, The Bloody Chamber, she examines the messages about adolescent sexuality in stories like 'Beauty and the Beast' and 'Snow White' overturning the sexual mythology of simple fairy stories." (Note: Beauty and the Beast, a fairy tale first published in 1740 and later analyzed by Angela Carter) (Note: Snow White, a German fairy tale later analyzed by Angela Carter)

Since the core of revisionist mythmaking for feminist poets lies in the challenging of gender stereotypes embodied in myth, revisionism in its most obvious form consists of hit-and-run attacks on familiar images and the social and literary conventions supporting them. The poems dismantle the literary convention to reveal the social ones and invert both, usually by the simple device of making "the Other" into the primary subject.

== Authors and artists of feminist revisionist mythology ==
- Suniti Namjoshi
- Angela Carter
- Carol P. Christ
- Anne Sexton
- Carol Ann Duffy
- Margaret Atwood
- Madeline Miller
- Pat Barker
- Muriel Rukeyser
- Alta
- Marija Gimbutas
- Louise Glück
- Paula Gunn Allen
- Mona Van Duyn
- June Jordan
- Alicia Ostriker
- Adrienne Rich
- Sylvia Plath
- Clarissa Pinkola Estés
- Emma Lazarus
- Luisah Teish
- Barbara Tedlock
- Mary Shelley
- Starhawk
- Merlin Stone
- Marion Zimmer Bradley
- Gloria Anzaldúa
- Chris Wind

== Related works ==
- Proserpine (1820), by Mary and Percy Bysshe Shelley
- The Speed of Darkness (1960), by Muriel Rukeyser
- To Bedlam and Part Way Back (1960), by Anne Sexton
- All My Pretty Ones (1962), by Anne Sexton
- Snapshots of a Daughter-in-Law (1963), by Adrienne Rich
- Ariel (1965), by Sylvia Plath
- Motherpeace Tarot
- The Bloody Chamber (1979), by Angela Carter
- The Silence of the Girls (2018) by Pat Barker

== See also ==
- Feminist literary criticism
- Historical revisionism
- Feminist film theory
- Feminist theory
- Literary criticism
- Women's writing in English
- Feminist Exegesis
- Feminist theology
