= Timeline of first women's suffrage in majority-Muslim countries =

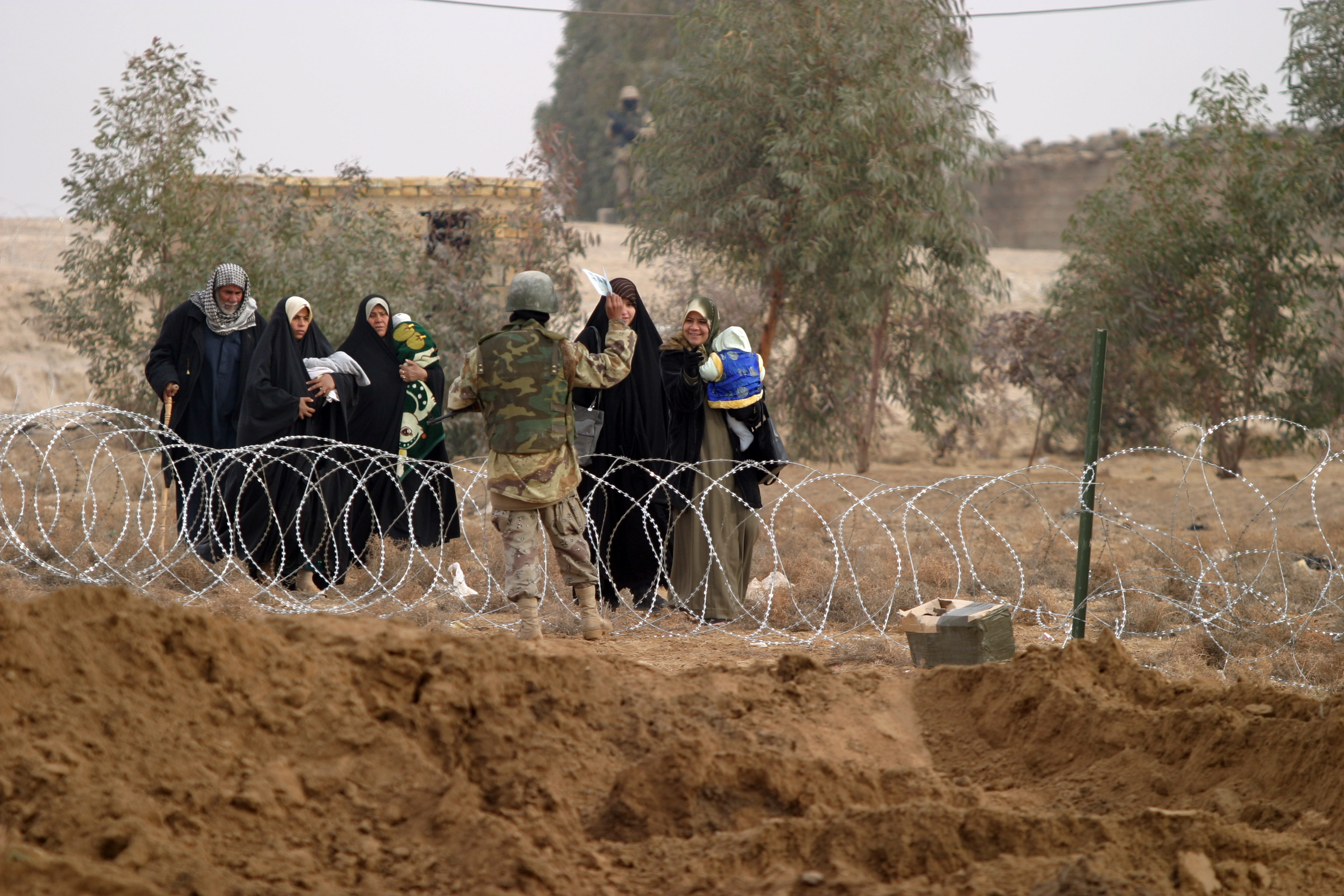
Nasarwasalam, Iraq, January 30, 2005. Iraqi women set out to vote in the first free elections held in Iraq. Security for the polling site was provided by the Iraqi Security Force (ISF) and members of the US Marines Corps.

This timeline lists the dates of the first women's suffrage in Muslim majority countries. Dates for the right to vote, suffrage, as distinct from the right to stand for election and hold office, are listed.

Some countries with majority Muslim populations established universal suffrage upon national independence, including Pakistan, Bangladesh, Indonesia, and Malaysia. In most North Africa countries, women participated in the first national elections or soon following. Some dates relate to regional elections and, where possible, the second date of general election has been included. Even countries listed may not have universal suffrage for women, and some may have regressed in women's rights since the initial granting of suffrage.

== Timeline ==
=== 1917 ===
- United Republics of the North Caucasus
- Crimean People's Republic

=== 1918 ===
- Azerbaijan Democratic Republic
- Kyrgyz SSR (Soviet Republic)

=== 1920 ===
- Albania

=== 1921 ===
- Azerbaijan SSR (Soviet Republic)

=== 1924 ===
- Tajik SSR (Soviet Republic)
- Kazakh SSR (Soviet Republic)

=== 1927 ===
- Turkmen SSR (Soviet Republic)

=== 1930 ===
- Turkey (municipal elections)

=== 1932 ===
- Maldives

=== 1934 ===
- Turkey (national elections)

=== 1938 ===
- Uzbek SSR (Soviet Republic)

=== 1945 ===
- Senegal
- Indonesia

=== 1946 ===
- (France) French Somaliland
- Republic of Mahabad

=== 1947 ===
- Pakistan (upon its national independence)
- Bangladesh (Bangladesh was eastern part of Pakistan and later achieved independence from Pakistan on December 16, 1971 and women suffrage was never barred.)

=== 1948 ===
- Niger

=== 1949 ===
- Syria

=== 1952 ===
- Lebanon (an educational requirement)
- Ivory Coast

=== 1956 ===
- Comoros
- Egypt
- Mali
- British Somaliland

=== 1957 ===
- Lebanon (universal)
- Malaya (now Peninsular Malaysia)

=== 1958 ===
- Upper Volta
- Chad
- Guinea

=== 1959 ===
- Tunisia
- Brunei

=== 1960 ===
- Gambia

=== 1961 ===
- Sierra Leone
- Mauritania

=== 1962 ===
- Algeria
- Brunei (revoked)

=== 1963 ===
- Iran (after a referendum)
- Morocco

=== 1964 ===
- Libya
- Sudan

=== 1965 ===
- Afghanistan (first time)

=== 1967 ===
- South Yemen

=== 1970 ===
- North Yemen

=== 1973 ===
- Bahrain (Bahrain did not hold elections until 2002.)

=== 1974 ===
- Jordan

=== 1976 ===
- West Bank (women allowed to vote in local elections for the first time; at the previous election, in 1972, only male property owners could vote)

=== 1978 ===
- Nigeria (North)

=== 1980 ===
- Iraq

=== 1985 ===
- Kuwait (first time)

=== 1996 ===
- Afghanistan (revoked by the Taliban)
- Gaza Strip (first elections held in the territory since 1923)

=== 1999 ===
- Qatar
- Kuwait (revoked)

=== 2002 ===
- Afghanistan (re-granted after the fall of the Taliban)

=== 2003 ===
- Oman

=== 2005 ===
- Kuwait (re-granted)

=== 2006 ===
- United Arab Emirates

=== 2011 ===
- Saudi Arabia (introduced along with right to run for municipal elections in 2015)

=== 2021 ===
- Afghanistan (revoked)

== See also ==
- Rawya Ateya (first female parliamentarian in Egypt and the Arab world)
- List of the first female members of parliament by country
- List of equal or majority Muslim countries
- List of suffragists and suffragettes
- List of women's rights activists
- Sex segregation in Islam
- Timeline of women's suffrage
- Women in Islam
