= Feminism in Nepal =

Feminism in Nepal is primarily concerned with equity and equality of opportunity. Nepali society is traditionally patriarchal. Feminists in Nepal seek to address this situation. Most women in Nepal are placed below to their husbands and fathers in a social hierarchy.

In the past, Nepalese women were treated poorly in every aspect of Nepalese society: social, political, or economic.

Statistics from Violence Against Women, highlights these inequalities:

- 77 percent of the episodes of violence against women are reported from within the family.
- 22 percent of women aged 15 to 49 have experienced physical violence at least once since the age 15.
- 43 percent of women have experienced sexual harassment at workplace.
- Between 5,000 and 12,000 girls and women are trafficked every year. 75 percent of them are below 18 years of age and the majority are sold into forced prostitution.

== History ==
The first feminist organization in Nepal was the Nepal Woman Association, which was started under the leadership of Mangala Devi Singh.

Before 2007, women under 35 could not apply for passports without their father's or husband's permission.

In August 2009, there was a protest in Kathmandu, in response to the government's decision to give $650 cash to single Nepali women in exchange for getting married. They called this march the "government sponsored dowry".

== Achievements ==
- 33% seats are reserved in every committee and group starting from the grassroots level up to the legislative of Nepal for women. However, these reservation policies are not strictly enforced.
- Government grants subsidy on tax while registering property in the name of women to improve the access of women on property.
- There are specific set of grammar rules within the Nepalese language, specifically toward women. Towards the mid-20th century, it began to change due to the feminist movement, which took notice of these words being used. Most of the language consisted of sexist words to describe women, while men were described with positive words.

== Organisations ==
- ABC Nepal
- Maiti Nepal
- Forum for Women, Law and Development
- Sancharika Samuha
- Shakti Samuha
- Women LEAD
- Women Rehabilitation Centre (WOREC Nepal)
- Women for Peace and Democracy Nepal
- Dilasha Aviyan (or Console Mission)

== Significant individuals ==
One of the few women who have made a great impact on Nepal's feminist movement is Simon de Beauvoir, with her book The Second Sex. Such strong-willed writing helped remind most Nepali women of their rights as citizens.
