= Feminist theory in composition studies =

Application of feminist theory to composition studies

Feminist theory in composition studies examines how gender, language, and cultural studies affect the teaching and practice of writing. It challenges the traditional assumptions and methods of composition studies and proposes alternative approaches that are informed by feminist perspectives. Feminist theory in composition studies covers a range of topics, such as the history and development of women's writing, the role of gender in rhetorical situations, the representation and identity of writers, and the pedagogical implications of feminist theory for writing instruction. Feminist theory in composition studies also explores how writing can be used as a tool for empowerment, resistance, and social change. Feminist theory in composition studies emerged in the late 1960s and early 1970s as a response to the male-dominated field of composition and rhetoric. It has been influenced by various feminist movements and disciplines, such as second-wave feminism, poststructuralism, psychoanalysis, critical race theory, and queer theory. Feminist theory in composition studies has contributed to the revision of traditional rhetorical concepts, the recognition of diverse voices and genres, the promotion of collaborative and ethical communication, and the integration of personal and political issues in writing.

== Overview ==
In composition studies, feminism is generally focused on giving feedback while taking into account gender difference. Thus, an instructor with a feminist pedagogy is unlikely to favor an androcentric method of teaching. A feminist approach in composition "would focus on questions of difference and dominance in written language".

Feminist theory and composition studies co-exist when academic scholars look more closely at marginalized writers. Feminism was introduced into the field of composition through the collaboration of educational institutions and writing teachers. It was also influenced by different academic and social disciplines. This helped to change the way that compositionists viewed the expectations and standards of good writing. Laura R Micciche's writing on feminist rhetoric in regard to teaching writing pedagogies suggested that it can be used to create and re-create ideas about how writing is taught. The theory behind feminist rhetoric is to intentionally use ideology and politics when writing. Micciche states, "feminist rhetors—have revised traditional rhetorical concepts through an explicitly gendered and, quite frequently, feminist lens." Micciche also stated, "Sonja Foss and Cindy Griffin identify a primary goal of feminist rhetoric to be the creation of spaces for rhetors to "develop models for cooperative, nonadversarial, and ethical communication." Feminist scholars have used strategic arguments to obtain support for changing power dynamics within society. Feminist theory argues that the empowerment of women can improve society. In collaboration with composition studies the Feminist theory helps to create diverse educational standards in regard to the teaching of writing. Feminist scholars look at how patriarchal perspectives have shaped societies and cultures. They also bring awareness to voices that have been neglected or ignored. This also is evident in an article by Patricia Fancher and Ellen O'Connell, in social group settings, like a classroom, men use misogyny to intimidate educators. Doing so through a work environment, men feel as though they have the power to undermine women in any setting. Makes it difficult for women to be educators because of these actions. This is reflected through the student evaluations that show gender bias against women faculty Evidently in the article is used, that women who have institutional knowledge over men, could be seen as underwhelming because of the respect aspect towards how men treat women educators. They might perceive them as unserious and not knowledgeable enough assuming because of their gender.

As Shari J. Stenberg explains, women's voices have not necessarily been absent in writing; they have sometimes just not been looked for or valued. Stenberg explains the dangers of only focusing on traditionally privileged voices, saying that doing this often removes important types of rhetorics, such as journal entries, letters, or other more feminine forms, from academic discourse or conversations. Adding these types of rhetoric back into conversations can help to redefine what are considered acceptable forms of writing for study and can also push to include traditionally marginalized groups, such as queer women and women of color. Allowing for these inclusions can also empower women to claim their multi-faceted identities, which further allows for the use of "the personal as a site of knowledge." These ideas not only can expand the range of issues women can write about, but have also helped to frame how some women teach composition. In the 1960s, the second wave of feminism began and one major goal was to raise society's consciousness of the struggles of women. The goals of feminists were largely carried out in university classrooms. Specifically, in the composition classroom, Faye Spencer Moar claimed that the way writing was taught largely favored male writers. Mary P. Hiatt claimed that women implicitly write differently than men, and that men tended to write in the dominant, most oft taught style. As men pursue that their lives are seeming more important than the respect towards women. In the writing of Dotson he explained, Men especially in institution policies think they have the power to use women in authority positions. They have their own issues and pursue them into women's issues. This instance includes a conflict of how men will feel a constant threat towards women's intelligence on how the perceived power they feel is being used to justify the actions of men. As mentioned men push their issues on to women as they feel that they aren't a problem in the workplace.

Hiatt argues that the terms "masculine" and "feminine" are applied to styles of writing–that of men and women, respectively–but, instead of describing the style, what is actually described is the male views on both men and women. Her examples include "strong", "rational", and "logical" for men, and "emotional", "hysterical", and "silly" for women. Thus, the aim of feminism in composition studies was to create a classroom in which women perceived themselves intellectually and in which their voices were relevant in what some feminists perceive to be an androcentric world.

Significant goal to unmask the patriarchy structure and the difference between misogyny and sexism. Educate individuals on the meaning of feminisms through literature. Ability to restructure what the society illustrates as gender-based culture and regress towards younger generations. This is consistently viewed through societal norms from past generations that have also experienced through the respect of women as emphasized through Lori Chamberlain, The concept of marginalized women due to western society tendencies. Be able to argue that the women's duties at one are not just what women are for. Re-examine the value of productivity over reproductively towards masculine or feminine. As well as referenced in Jenkins, Ameliorative analysis of gender concepts seeks to do so by defining women by referring to subordination. Women are difficult and risk exclusion or marginalization. Typically women in oppressed social groups, such as women of color or working class. These marginalized attributes that have almost benefited significantly towards men and how they conceptually perceive women. The societal norms of keeping up with what has been perceived towards women and how women are treated with respect within society.

== Pedagogy ==
Early feminist theory's inflections on composition and pedagogy aimed to challenge the cultural conventions and expectations of the feminine gender role. Women were encouraged to write independently, without relying on external validation. At the time, this process worked in conversation with the Expressivist-Process movement in composition, which valued self-expression, to enable women to grow conscious of themselves.

Finding an authentic female voice in composition can be a challenge amidst a context that does not value what women have to say. Through the lens of feminism and composition, writers and students are encouraged to boldly express women's experience in both content and form.

Elizabeth Flynn's article "Composing as a Woman" is the most cited example of the relationship between composition studies and feminism. She writes that feminist theory "emphasize[s] that males and females differ in their developmental processes and in their interactions with others". Thus, a feminist instructor will take into account the implicit differences between male and female writers and teach appropriately, without favoring or focusing on androcentric or gynocentric studies. Feminist pedagogy involves reading texts written by women, and taking care to understand those texts are not simply appropriations of texts written by men, without any sort of critique of androcentrism.

One style of feminist theory that is being utilized in the composition classroom is the theory of Invitational Rhetoric. Sonja K. Foss and Cindy L. Griffin, first proposed the idea of Invitational Rhetoric as "grounded in the feminist principles of equality, imminent value and self-determination" (5). Originally this was considered a communication theory. More recently, it has grown across curriculums, including the use in English composition classrooms. As a newer philosophy in English composition, the use of invitational rhetoric is used as a way to make students feel comfortable in the classroom setting. By using Foss and Griffin's Invitational Rhetoric theory as a guide in conducting classes, instructors are able to encourage their students to share their beliefs and learn to respect others opinions, without having to feel like opposite views are being force-fed to them in a way that would cause them to turn away from debate or discussions that could foster critical thinking. According to Foss and Griffin, Invitational Rhetoric works through the use of debate and discussion as a way to learn about various viewpoints, with the freedom to ultimately make up one's own minds about the topic. Abby Knoblauch describes the use of Invitational Rhetoric as a way to make sure conservative students are not put on the offensive by more liberal teachers and their ideals. By using Invitational Rhetoric as a guide in presenting material, an instructor can in turn foster a student's creativity and encourage them to write about what is important to them.

Shari J. Stenberg further suggests that women must be able to define their roles in the composition classroom in order to have successful interactions with their students. She proposes the use of metaphors for women to do this, going on to say that they must be willing to constantly reinvent themselves in order to allow for their own shifting personalities and how their personal identities influence their interactions with their students. Female composition teachers have previously been viewed as disciplinarians and care takers. Stenberg supposes that, in order for women to be able to define themselves in their classrooms, they must take control of their unique and multi-dimensional identities in order to create their own space as educators.

== Research ==
Flynn researched the narratives of her first-year composition students for their disparities. She says, "The narratives of the female students are stories of interaction, of connection, or of frustrated connection. The narratives of the male students are stories of achievement, of separation, or of frustrated achievement". Feminist research "tries to arrive at hypotheses that are free of gender loyalties," says Patricia A. Sullivan.

Sandra Harding lists three characteristics of feminist research in her book Feminism and Methodology that Sullivan deems appropriate for consideration into feminist studies of composition, not just the social sciences, which is what Harding is concerned with. These characteristics are, first, using women's experiences as an "indicator of the realist against which hypotheses are tested." Second, the research is "designed for women" and provides "social phenomena that [women] want or need." Third, it "insists that the inquirer her/himself be placed in the same critical plane as the overt subject matter" .

Sullivan believes these three characteristics are relevant to composition studies because of the common practice to conduct research from a standpoint that is gender-neutral (neither men over women, nor vice versa), gender-inclusive (considering both male and female perspectives, processes, and styles, not just those of females), and researcher disinterestedness (the common practice of keeping one's self out of the research process in order to allow for an unbiased analysis).
