= Feminism and modern architecture =

Feminist theory as it relates to architecture

Feminist theory as it relates to architecture has forged the way for the rediscovery of such female architects as Eileen Gray, Charlotte Perriand, Marion Mahoney Griffin, Lilly Reich, Jane Drew, Lina Bo Bardi, Anne Tyng, Norma Merrick Sklarek, Denise Scott Brown, among many others. These women imagined an architecture that challenged the status quo, and paved the way for future women designers and architects.

== Women's entry into architecture ==
In July 1872, Julia Ward Howe, a champion of women's rights, delivered a lecture to the Victorian Discussion Society in London, focusing on women artists. She pondered the absence of female architects despite their perceived suitability and potential in the field.

"Women ought to agitate to be articled to some of our architects, many of whom, unfortunately, have neither taste or ideas, and could do nothing but calculate the bricks wanted, and the profits to be made."

A number of male critics and journalists who specialized in architecture used this opportunity to negatively criticize women entering the architectural field, proclaiming it a "men's profession." These men included Thomas Raggles Davison, the editor of the British Architect, who published an article in 1902 entitled "May Women Practise Architecture?" where he came to the conclusion that "women are temperamentally unfitted to the production of good architectural design" and that "their lightness of touch," and "charming decorativeness lacked the masculine strength of handling needed for architecture." Just 16 years later, in April 1888, Louise Bethune, became the first woman elected to be a member of the American Institute of Architects (AIA).

"The future of a woman in the architectural profession is what she sees herself fit to make it."

The first two architecture programs in the US were developed at both the Massachusetts Institute of Technology in 1865 and at Cornell University in 1871, both based on the teachings of the Parisian school; Ecole des Beaux-Arts.

== Women architects and designers from the Modernist era ==
The idea of the changing needs of the family can be seen in the houses of Truus Schröder, Eileen Gray and LeCorbusier's Villa Stein de-Monzie. The Rietveld Schröder House is an excellent example of the way that the "modern" lives of the family demanded a new architecture.

"The Schröder House was not only a creative work of artistic design but offered its users a new environment in which to redefine family life, women's rights and the responsibilities of individuals and to each other"

Much like Schröder, Gray designed an architecture that would address the needs of the occupants and the new family unit. Gray worked within the model of modern architecture, LeCorbusier's "5 points of new architecture" for example as well as addressing the issues of the building or home as an experience. This house is of particular importance in feminist theory because it called into question the typical domestic group and gender relations. This domestic group that included a married couple and a woman with her child called domestic space into question.

Jane Drew, a prominent Modernist architect from Britain, served as a principal architect at the firm Fry, Drew and Partners, founded in 1950 alongside Maxwell Fry. One of Jane Drew's most prominent designs was the Pilkington Brothers Head Office in St Helen's, England, built in 1964. She was an influential figure in making strides for women in architecture, specifically in the modernist era.

Denise Scott Brown, another influential architect, of Venturi, Scott Brown, and Associates, was a graduate from the Architectural Association School of Architecture in London in 1955. In 1967, back when it was incredibly rare for women to become principals of any firm, she became co-principal alongside Robert Venturi. Although their work would most likely be classified as post-modernist architecture, Denise Scott Brown's advocation for women in architecture still applies.

Cini Boeri states in the Breaking Ground: Architecture by Women book written by Jane Hall:

"When I'm designing I never think about being either a woman or a man."

In 1905, Mabel Brown, of the San Francisco Chronicle, interviewed licensed women architects to further understand why women "remained something of a curiosity" and was told that "it is next to impossible for women to make headway when denied a beginning."

== Grassroots architecture organizations that demanded equality ==
The 1970s saw an increase in recognition of women who were practicing in the field of architecture.

OWA (The Organization of Women Architects), Chicago Women in Architecture, and AWA (The Alliance of Women in Architecture) are just three organizations who developed platforms which aimed to shine a light on the challenges women encounter in the field of architecture due to discrimination, while also offering guidance and encouragement to their members in progressing their professional paths.

== Women architects and designers in the present ==
There are a number of women in architecture who have continued and extended upon the work of women in modernism, like Tatiana Bilbao, Zaha Hadid, Jeanne Gang, Kazuyo Sejima, Odile Decq, Maya Lin, Elizabeth Diller, Farshid Moussavi, Toshiko Mori, Elizabeth Diller, Sofia von Ellrichshausen, among others.

These women are just a few of some of the most influential architects of our time. It is important to acknowledge that they did not create "feminist architecture" but instead have paved the way for women in this field to advocate for further representation and equality.

For example, Zaha Hadid was born in Iraq, and emerged as a leading architect of her generation, carrying forward the legacy of the women from the modernist era with profound influence. She was the very first woman to ever win the Pritzker Prize in 2004 (a prominent architectural design award given to only a select group of influential designers). In 2015, she was also the only woman to be presented with the Royal Gold Medal for Architecture by the Royal Institute of British Architects (RIBA). This is especially important for women architects and designers today, as the number of women being acknowledged in these authoritative positions is still incredibly rare.

Another principal architect, Elizabeth Diller, of Diller Scofidio + Renfro, states in the Breaking Ground: Architecture by Women book:

"Rather than trying to kick the establishment walls down, we're walking in through the front door."

The co-founder of Bubble Architects, Patricia Hickey, stated in the book Where are the Women Architects, "We need to be clear that women are being held back from promotion in architectural offices not because the practice directors think they will not be respected on site, but because the primarily male directors do NOT respect female leaders within the office." This is incredibly important to note as this makes sure we do NOT place the blame on the women in terms of accessing higher, more authoritative positions, and rather hold the primarily CIS-gendered men in these positions accountable for their misogynistic actions.

== Gender discrimination in the current profession of architecture ==
There is an obscene amount of gender discrimination that women face as they exit architecture school and transition into the current field of design, architecture, and engineering. The unfortunate statistic is that although there is an increase in women graduating from architecture school, there is a continuous decline in licensed women architects, more specifically, women of color. In the book, Where are the Women Architects?" by Despina Stratigakos, it is stated that in the year 2000, 13 percent of registered architects were women, and in 2016, the percentage only grew to 19 percent. Based on this slow progress and data, it might be 2093 before there will be a 50/50 split for both women and men.

Another unfortunate reality for women in this field is the issue of sexual harassment and misogyny. This is especially evident in the construction management side of the field, where women are often looked down upon.

== See also ==
- Women in architecture
