= Vésuviennes =

The Vésuviennes were a radical feminist group that existed in France in the middle of the 19th century. They chose their name (derived from Mount Vesuvius) because, in their words, "Like lava, so long held back, that must at last pour out around us, [our idea of feminist equality] is in no way incendiary but in all ways regenerating."

With the overthrow of King Louis-Philippe of France in 1848, the newly formed Republic lifted all restrictions on the press and assembly. This encouraged a proliferation of new feminist publications, organizations, and groups. The Vésuviennes were among the latter. Considered to be the most radical of all of the feminist factions of the time, the Vésuviennes promoted female military service, the right of women to dress the same as men, and legal and domestic equality between husband and wife, even as that extended to the distribution of household chores. Most Vésuviennes were between the ages of 15 and 30, unmarried, poorly paid workers. Even some other feminists disapproved of their tactics, which included wearing culottes (not unlike the bloomers worn by radical American feminists at the time) and staging frequent street demonstrations.

The image of a young woman in culottes came to represent all feminists to some, as can be seen in the caricatures of Charles-Édouard de Beaumont, one of several artists who satirized the efforts of feminists of the period in popular political papers such as Le Charivari.

Until recently the existence of this feminist organization was regarded as genuine, if poorly documented. Some historians have recently argued that the organisation was itself "a burlesque creation of the French police who drew up a constitution for it and provided it with prostitutes as members".
