= Feminist sexology =

Study of sexuality focused on women

Feminist sexology is an offshoot of traditional studies of sexology that focuses on the intersectionality of sex and gender in relation to the sexual lives of women. Sexology has a basis in psychoanalysis, specifically Freudian theory, which played a big role in early sexology. This reactionary field of feminist sexology seeks to be inclusive of experiences of sexuality and break down the problematic ideas that have been expressed by sexology in the past. Feminist sexology shares many principles with the overarching field of sexology; in particular, it does not try to prescribe a certain path or "normality" for women's sexuality, but only observe and note the different and varied ways in which women express their sexuality. It is a young field, but one that is growing rapidly.

== Themes ==
Many of the topics that feminist sexologists study include (but are not limited to) reproductive rights, sex work, gay and transgender identities, marriage, pornography and gender roles. Much of the work within feminist sexology has been done within the last few decades, focusing on the movements of sexual liberation in the 1960s and 1970s, the introduction of an easily handled and effective means of contraception, lesbian and transgender visibility, and the stronger waves of women taking charge of their lives. There has been much debate about whether the sexual revolution was really beneficial to women, if a pro-sex attitude can really be achieved within the context of Western society, but as new voices are lifted, layers of interpretation and knowledge can be gathered.

=== Lesbianism ===
Lesbianism is a major theme of feminist sexology. Lesbian society and culture is one that is often overlooked by general society resulting in lesbian women being disregarded and ultimately ignored in public and professional spaces. In the workplace, for example, lesbian women are often still sexualized and forced to play the role of the 'heterosexual female.' Feminist theorist Adrienne Rich discusses this type of oppression in her article, "Compulsory Heterosexuality":

Women endure sexual harassment to keep their jobs and learn to behave in a complacently and ingratiatingly heterosexual manner… the woman who too decisively resists sexual overtures in the workplace is accused of being 'dried-up and sexless, or lesbian.

The lesbian in society is of utmost importance in that she bears the weight of judgement and oppression on her shoulders for love and the progression of the woman. On page 649 of "Compulsory Heterosexuality" Rich writes, "Lesbian existence comprises both the breaking of a taboo and the rejection of a compulsory way of life."

=== Prostitution ===
In Gayle Rubin's article "Thinking Sex", Rubin discusses the shift of prostitution from a once socially acceptable occupation to a now isolated and reprimanded occupation in modern-day society. This shift in society's perception is known as the "modernization of sex". The modernization of sex in the case of prostitution is defined as the organization of sex groups such as prostitutes, homosexuals, sadomasochists, etc. into localized populations. On page 156 of "Thinking Sex" Rubin regards the occupation of prostitution and its place in present-day society,

Sex work is an occupation… Prostitutes are a criminal sexual population stigmatized on the basis of sexual activity… Prostitutes are the primary prey of vice police.

Anti-prostitution laws have also surfaced in recent years, dismantling prostitution in local jurisdictions and restricting various forms of sexual commerce. On page 163, Rubin writes how these actions are justified:

[These actions are] rationalized by portraying them as menaces to health and safety, women and children… or civilization itself. Even when activity is acknowledged to be harmless, it may be banned because it is alleged to 'lead' to something ostensibly worse.

=== Children and sexuality ===
In her article "Thinking Sex: Notes for a Radical Theory of the Politics of Sexuality", Gayle Rubin states that society teaches children about gender and sex; they know nothing about it when they are born, because gender and sex are socially constructed ideas, according to her. Society teaches our children about social norms through actions. This models gender through behavior and children learn to act in a certain way depending if they are male or female.

During the nineteenth century, the idea of masturbation was considered to be a taboo and unhealthy practice. What was thought of as premature sexual interest in a child was strongly discouraged, because sexual excitement of any kind was thought to damage the health and discourage the maturation of a child. In the past, parents have resorted to extreme measures to prevent children from masturbating, such as tying them down to keep from touching themselves or even making permanent surgical changes to their genitals. While these extreme measures have for the most part been abandoned in today's society, the attitude that the idea of sex is harmful to children still endures.

According to Anne Fausto-Stearling, Infant Genital Surgery is a cosmetic surgery performed on infants who do not fit into a defined gender category (sometimes with or without the parent's consent). The surgery reshapes their sexual reproductive organs into either male or female gender binaries without considering the child's wishes or what they may have chosen later in life. This can lead to gender confusion and unhappiness as the child grows, and may even have a biological physical impact on how the child's reproductive organs develop.

=== Sex and respectability ===
Gayle Rubin argues that modern society judges sex acts through their theoretical value. She states that "Marital, reproductive heterosexuals are alone at the top erotic pyramid." This means that because the people engaging in sex are married, heterosexual, and the possibility of reproduction is present, the act of sex has a higher value in accordance with societal norms. Unmarried heterosexual sex is also valued, but not as much. Monogamous, heteronormative lesbian and gay relationships are not quite as respected, but are considered to still be of minimal value. "The most despised sexual castes currently include transsexuals, transvestites, fetishists, sadomasochists, sex workers such as prostitutes and porn models..." Solitary sex acts, or masturbation, are not even considered a part of the hierarchy. These sex acts are ordered in such a way because of their ability to reproduce and create children. "According to this system, sexuality that is 'good', 'normal', and 'natural' should ideally be heterosexual, marital, monogamous, reproductive, and non-commercial." Anything relating to sex that breaks these societally prescribed rules is considered to be "bad" and "unnatural", such as homosexuality, fetish objects, the use of pornography, and casual sex, amongst others:

All these hierarchies of sexual value – religious, psychiatric, and popular – function in much the same ways as do ideological systems of racism, ethnocentrism, and religious chauvinism. They rationalize the well-being of the sexually privileged and the adversity of the sexual rabble.

== Main points ==
=== Male power ===
Under the patriarchal culture of sexual desire, women are suppressed to express their true feeling about sexual behaviors. Women's fear of desire keeps them quiet and justify society's belief that men have the power and authority in the relationships. Women are not allowed to express their sexual needs and male power is against masturbation.

While being taught to be conservative about sexual desire, women are also taught in a contradictory way that their bodies should be readily available for the pleasure of men without having a sexual voice. Sexology has a basis within psychology and the way the DSM-5 has categorized female sexual dysfunctions play into issues of male power over the sexuality of women. When it comes to sexual dysfunction among women, most are categorized as the woman having lowered sexual desire that causes "personal distress" over a period of time. Oftentimes, the personal distress that women are feeling is due to relationship problems, and an irritated partner from the lack of sexual desire. "Women are diagnosed and treated as sexually disordered because they have sex-related marital tensions, even if they are personally well adjusted to their sexual response." The DSM-5 fails to recognize other reasons a woman may not want to engage in sexually activity, and does not talk about "sexual communication, emotion, whole body experience, taboo and danger, commitment, attraction, sexual knowledge, safety, respect, feelings about bodies, breast cycles, pregnancy, contraception or getting old." Furthermore, the sexual sciences do not necessarily repress female sexuality as they base it on heteronormative masculinity without giving women a voice about their own sexuality.

Women not having a voice about their own sexuality is a highly recognized problem in various fields of feminist theory. In "The Uses of the Erotic: The Erotic as Power", Audre Lorde offers the solution that the erotic can be used as power to gain a voice about sexuality that is not based on male desire. "Our acts against oppression become integral with self, motivated and empowered from within," states Lorde. For Lorde, "the erotic" is not just sexuality; it is the power for people to love and be passionate about what they do in life. She sees "the erotic" as "power" because she believes that if women have erotic "power", they can have voice and be themselves in their lives. Moreover, the concept of compulsory heterosexuality makes the society believes that lesbian's sexuality is out of the norm. While there is a general recognition that the majority of sexual acts occur without the intent of reproduction, the definition of sex is still biological in nature, meaning that sex is heterosexual sex and that entails vaginal intercourse. Men believe that lesbians would defeat their power so they force heterosexuality as a default sexual orientation and disdain lesbians to make coming out difficult. Lesbianism is a threat to male supremacy because it destroys the myth about female inferiority, weakness, passivity.

Having said this, ideas about homosexuality are rooted in problematic ideas that were set forth by men in academic power. Homosexuality in general has historically been viewed by 20th century sexologists and psychoanalysts to be a disorder that people must normalize from. Homosexuality from Sigmund Freud's point of view was seen as a pathology which people were affected by due to disturbances within psychosexual stages. From Freud's theories about homosexuality, some came to the conclusion that homosexuality was something that could be treated. Additionally, Richard von Krafft-Ebing referred to lesbianism as being "incurable" although he still discussed how it could be treated.

=== Sexual violence ===
Sexual assault, rape and domestic sexual violence are serious issues in our society. Each year, for 35 of every 1,000 college women, those life-changing events will include a sexual assault. Many people blame sexual harassment and rape on women for staying outside at night, wearing short skirts, or flirting. The society puts the fault on women's behaviors, trying to make them feel bad. When women start thinking themselves as "trouble makers", they remain silent. Moreover, many victims are afraid of embarrassing their families and believe that rape victims rarely get justice; instead they will be scolded. Even though all women face this oppression, women of color are more vulnerable to sexual assault than white women. The Jezebel stereotype portrays women of colors as "unrapeable". The Jezebel stereotype began when 17th century European travelled to Africa and misinterpreted the nudity and polygamy of natives as uncontrollable sexual lust. This view of Black women was also perpetuated during slavery as a means to justify the sexual abuse, rape, and exploitation of these women by their slave owners. This stereotype is still widely used today in cinema, music, television and other forms of media.

- Jezebel: The stereotype that deems African American women as promiscuous, seductive, hypersexual, uncaring, and willing to use sex as a way of manipulation. Followed by this stereotype is a belief that Black women should be responsible for being sexual assaulted. Society justifies rape as a crime that only happens to women who asked for it.

Sexual violence is also a significant problem that is faced by trans and gender-nonconforming people. Trans people are often discriminated against by medical professionals, police officers, the court system, and other authoritative figures. Due to this, trans people are extremely vulnerable to sexual assault and often are not offered the resources to seek help, cope, and heal in a non judgmental setting. When looking at intersections of race, class, and ability, trans people are even more likely to be sexually assaulted when they face multiple levels of oppression.

=== Bodily autonomy ===
Women face the issue of not being able to make decisions regarding their reproductive rights or their bodies generally. Women are still fighting for access to birth control and the right of choice when it comes to abortion. Birth control and abortion have been highly politicized which has ended up politicizing women's bodies. Poor women and women of color are likely to have even less option and access to making reproductive choices. The Supreme Court Case Webster v. Reproductive Health Services banned public facilities and employees in Missouri from performing abortions unless it was a life saving procedure for the mother. Prior to this, Maher v. Roe determined that welfare payments could not be used for non therapeutic abortions even though they could be used expenses related to childbirth. These court decisions have ultimately worked in a way that do not allow poor women to choose to have an abortion.

Furthermore, women of color, especially Black, Latina, and Native American women have fallen victim to sterilization abuse. Native American women have faced being sterilized without consent or by being coerced as a result of the ideologies of imperialism, capitalism, patriarchy, and socioeconomic status. Sterilization abuse and the use birth control were seen as "a duty, not a right" for poor women of color. Issues within reproductive rights and control of the body are not isolated to the western world but are also global issues. Many women around the world, especially in Africa and Asia, are the victims of sex trafficking, sex slavery, child labor, genital mutilation or cutting and sterilization. Those women neither have controls of their own bodies nor freedom to speak for themselves. The documentary, based on the book, Half the Sky: Turning Oppression into Opportunity for Women Worldwide, focuses on this issues in six different countries. It talks about what sexual oppression women are facing in these places, how the government ignores and justifies the issues, and what organizations are working to fight for these victims.

== Influential thinkers ==
- Anne Fausto-Sterling - Fausto-Sterling, with a background in biology, has written several books on the subject of how gender interacts and is shaped by biology, society and culture. In her book, Sexing the Body, she takes a close look on how the definition of our sex and gender as a species by the society relegates our sexual identities and actions. She also tackles these subjects in her other works, including her books Myths of Gender and Love, Power and Knowledge (which she co-wrote with Hilary Rose.)
- Gayle Rubin - Rubin, a cultural anthropologist, focuses on many subjects, notably prostitution, pornography, sadomasochism and sexual subcultures. She has been a strong voice in the "pro-sex" arena of sexology, debating strongly the intersection of sexual identity and societal structure in the 1980s, during which it was dubbed the "Feminist Sex Wars". She also worked with Patrick Califia studying the gay leather scene.

=== Others ===
- Annie Sprinkle
- Sheila Jeffreys
- Biddy Martin
- Linda Grant
- Jack Halberstam
- Elizabeth Lapovsky Kennedy
- Madeline Davis
- Jane Wadsworth
- Luce Irigaray
- Anne McClintock
- Leonore Tiefer
- Alice Schwarzer

== See also ==
- Decriminalization of sex work
- Female promiscuity
- Feminist views on sexuality
- Feminism
- Gender studies
- Human female sexuality
- Queer studies
- Queer theory
- Sexology
- Sex-positive feminism
- Sex workers' rights
- Transfeminism
- Women's erotica
- Women's pornography
