= Feminism and equality =

One theory of the equality of the sexes

Feminism is one theory of the political, economic, and social equality of the sexes, even though many feminist movements and ideologies differ on exactly which claims and strategies are vital and justifiable to achieve equality.

However, equality, while supported by most feminists, is not universally seen as the required result of the feminist movement, even by feminists. Some consider it feminist to increase the rights of women from an origin that is less than man's without obtaining full equality. Their premise is that some gain of power is better than nothing. At the other end of the continuum, a minority of feminists have argued that women should set up at least one women-led society and some institutions.

Feminism and equality came in waves over the course of history, seeing some of the first actions in the early 18th century. According to Martha Rampton, a professor and director at Pacific University, "The wave formally began at the Seneca Falls Convention in 1848 when three hundred men and women rallied to the cause of equality for women. " Nonetheless, forms of feminism and equality had reached political goals, ratified on August 18, 1920, the 19th Amendment guaranteed all American women the right to vote. And as some presumed this would only do so much for women.

Freedom is sought by those among feminists who believe that equality is undesirable or irrelevant, although some equate gaining an amount of freedom equal to that of men to the pursuit of equality, thus joining those who claim equality as central to feminism.

== Agreement on definition ==
According to Tilburg University women's studies chair Tineke M. Willemsen, "[i]t is hardly even possible to give a definition of feminism that every feminist will agree with". Bronwyn Winter has criticized resistance to defining feminism for specialists and nonspecialists, a resistance "so widespread as to appear to be the dominant feminist theoretical position: a sort of 'non-position'". However, definitions have been offered in feminist literature and practice.

== Equality ==
Much of the literature defines feminism as being about equal rights for women or equality between the sexes. Not only did feminism influence equality among genders, but also in race. The Chicana Feminism Movement became politically active in the search for female and lesbian equality within American society. It challenged the roles of gender stereotypes.

Using different language, Riane Eisler, "re-examining human society from a gender-holistic perspective", "propose[d] ... two basic models of society", "[t]he first ... [being] the dominator model, ... what is popularly termed either patriarchy or matriarchy—the ranking of one half of humanity over the other" and "[t]he second, in which social relations are primarily based on the principle of linking rather than ranking, may best be described as the partnership model. In this model—beginning with the most fundamental difference in our species, between male and female—diversity is not equated with either inferiority or superiority." "[T]he problem is not men as a sex, but men and women as they must be socialized in a dominator system." She advocated for a gylany, a partnership linking the two genders, in lieu of the present and historical androcracy.

Of historical interest, Plato, according to Elaine Hoffman Baruch, around 394 B.C., while believing that men ultimately would excel, argued that women should be equal with men politically, socially, sexually, educationally, and in military combat and should be able to enter the highest class of society, that most gender differences could not be explained by biology (Plato being one of the earliest published thinkers to say so), and that a system of child care would free women to participate in society.

Some radical feminists critiqued equality, denying that "equality in an unjust society was worth fighting for".

== Ambiguous on equality ==
"Feminism makes claims for a rebalancing between women and men of the social, economic, and political power within a given society, on behalf of both sexes in the name of their common humanity, but with respect for their differences." When feminism and related words began being widely used in the 1890s in Europe and the Western Hemisphere and continuing into modern times, the terms' relationship to equality was often unclear. "Then, as now, many parties used the terms polemically, as epithets, rather than analytically; then, as now, the words were not used by everyone to mean the same thing. And, as the study of their history reveals, they referred far more often to the 'rights of women' than to 'rights equal to those of men.' The vocabulary of feminism connoted a far broader sociopolitical critique, a critique that was woman-centered and woman-celebratory in its onslaught on male privilege." People may argue if this wording really suggests such a profound difference though. Considering women have been on the short end of the stick regarding the law and their position in public it makes sense that feminism concentrated on women's rights.

Feminist author bell hooks wrote, "Masses of people think that feminism is always and only about women seeking to be equal to men.... The feminism they hear about the most is portrayed by women who are primarily committed to gender equality — equal pay for equal work, and sometimes women and men sharing household chores and parenting." "[F]eminism is a movement to end sexist oppression. Further, Feminism provides men with the advantage of doing jobs previously held by women. More male nurses are currently in our hospitals and wards than was the case years ago."

Deborah Siegel "use[s] the term ["feminism"] in a general sense to refer to the philosophy powering a movement to eradicate sexism and better women's lives."

Genders (usually distinguished from sexes) are counted as other than two in some feminist utopian literature, according to Karin Schönpflug, analyzing works by Gabriel de Foigny (1676), Ursula K. Le Guin (1969), Samuel R. Delany (1976), Donna Haraway (1980), and Alkeline van Lenning (1995).

== Ascending toward equality ==
Feminism in practice can be exhausting and expensive and other needs may compete for personal and organizational resources. Pragmatism may encourage seeking lesser goals, such as having more power than without feminism while not trying to seek full equality.

According to Alice Echols, "Carol Hanisch ... argued that looking pretty and acting dumb were survival strategies which women should continue to use until such time as the 'power of unity' could replace them."

One feminist leader, Ann Snitow, speculated that difference feminism became preferred over gender equality so that "men might be more responsive".

In the late 18th century in Britain, Mary Wollstonecraft wrote in A Vindication of the Rights of Woman of "[a]sserting the rights which women in common with men ought to contend for". "Let it not be concluded that I wish to invert the order of things; I have already granted, that, from the constitution of their bodies, men seem to be designed by Providence to attain a greater degree of virtue. I speak collectively of the whole sex; but I see not the shadow of a reason to conclude that their virtues should differ in respect to their nature." "I ... would fain convince reasonable men of the importance of some of my remarks, and prevail on them to weigh dispassionately the whole tenor of my observations.—I appeal to their understandings; and, as a fellow-creature, claim, in the name of my sex, some interest in their hearts. I entreat them to assist to emancipate their companion, to make her a help meet for them! [¶] Would men but generously snap our chains, and be content with rational fellowship instead of slavish obedience, they would find us more observant daughters, more affectionate sisters, more faithful wives, more reasonable mothers—in a word, better citizens."

== Superiority ==
According to Diane Davis, radical feminisms "tend to be interested in female privilege rather than equality." Spiritual feminism and ecofeminism, according to Prof. Davis, are interested less in equity than in finding ways to flip the ["masculine/feminine"] binary privilege" to place "the 'feminine' ... on top (so to speak)." Some authors of utopian fiction wrote about "ideal worlds in which women's positions are better than men's".

A minority of feminists have called for the existence of one or possibly more societies in which women would govern women and men. Some scholars have reported that some such societies existed, although not without dispute as to their existence. According to Cynthia Eller, feminist spirituality stated a belief in "female equality or superiority" in the past and the future while not in the present and some adherents debated "female supremacy versus equality of power relations between the sexes" in prehistory. In the early 20th century, however, few of the first feminists created any organization to develop a concept or plan for such a society.

== Freedom, apart from equality ==
Difference feminism is based on the assumption that women and men are different, that for women to be equal to men means to be like men, which is not desirable. Instead of equality, difference feminism is based on women having freedom.

In 1916, Charlotte Perkins Gilman argued for feminism without calling for "equality". Favoring women's "freedom" and "full[ness]", she wrote, "[f]eminism ... is the social awakening of the women of all the world. It is that great movement ... which is changing the centre of gravity in human life..... It is the movement for ... [among other goals] [women's] full economic independence..... [A]nti-feminists [speak] ... in their frantic fear of freedom for women." She wrote of essential differences between women and men, including in motherhood and fatherhood, and that "[f]eminists are women, plus: plus full human endowment and activity."

== Politics ==
=== Organizations ===
Examples of organizations in the U.S. seeking equality are the National Women's Political Caucus (NWPC) and the National Organization for Women (NOW) and, historically, the National Woman's Party (NWP). NOW, at its first national conference, in 1967, called for equality, e.g., "Equal Rights Constitutional Amendment", "Equal and Unsegregated Education", "Equal Job Training Opportunities", "equal employment opportunity [to] be guaranteed to all women, as well as men", "the right of women to be educated to their full potential equally with men ... eliminating all discrimination and segregation by sex", and "the right of women in poverty to secure job training, housing, and family allowances on equal terms with men".

=== Notable Politicians ===
Victoria Woodhull ran in the 1872 election to be President of the U.S., asserting a right to equality.

Nesta Helen Webster, a political conservative in the U.K. early in the 20th century, implied the genders might be equal and believed that there had been "women's supremacy ... [in] pre-revolutionary France, when powerful women never attempted to compete directly with men, but instead drew strength from other areas where they excelled, in particular, 'the power of organisation and the power of inspiration.'"

== Bibliography ==
- Davis, Debra Diane (2000). Breaking Up [at] Totality: A Rhetoric of Laughter. Carbondale, IL: Southern Illinois University Press. ISBN 0-8093-2228-5.
- Echols, Alice (1989). Daring to Be Bad: Radical Feminism in America 1967–1975. American Culture series. Minneapolis, MN: University of Minnesota Press. ISBN 0-8166-1787-2.
- Eisler, Riane (1987). The Chalice and the Blade: Our History, Our Future. HarperCollins. ISBN 0-06-250287-5.
- Eller, Cynthia (1991). "Relativizing the patriarchy: the sacred history of the feminist spirituality movement". History of Religions. 30 (3): 279–295. doi:10.1086/463229. JSTOR 1062958. S2CID 162395492.
- hooks, bell (2000). Feminism is for Everybody: Passionate Politics. Cambridge, MA: South End Press. ISBN 0-89608-628-3.
- Offen, Karen (1988). "Defining feminism: a comparative historical approach". Signs: Journal of Women in Culture and Society. 14 (1): 119–157. doi:10.1086/494494. JSTOR 3174664. S2CID 144146547.
- Schönpflug, Karin (2008). Feminism, Economics and Utopia: Time Travelling Through Paradigms. London: Routledge. ISBN 978-0-415-41784-6.
- Wollstonecraft, Mary (2009). "A Vindication of the Rights of Woman". In Deidre Shauna Lynch (ed.). Mary Wollstonecraft: A Vindication of the Rights of Woman: An Authoritative Text Backgrounds and Contexts Criticism. Norton Critical Editions. New York, NY: W. W. Norton. ISBN 978-0-393-92974-4.
- Zerilli, Linda M. G. (2005). Feminism and the Abyss of Freedom. Chicago, IL: University of Chicago Press. ISBN 0-226-98133-9.
