= Feminist Anti-Censorship Task Force =

The Feminist Anti-Censorship Task Force, often abbreviated to FACT, was a sex-positive feminist task force founded in 1984 by Ann Barr Snitow to challenge censorship in media, most notably in relation to the censorship of pornography. Other notable members of FACT include Ellen Willis, Nan D. Hunter, and Sylvia A. Law.

FACT's contribution to sex positive feminism lies in its legal challenges of the 1984 Indianapolis Anti-Pornography Ordinance and the 1984 Suffolk, New York Anti-Pornography Ordinance. The Indianapolis ordinance was authored by Andrea Dworkin, a radical anti-pornography feminist, and Catharine MacKinnon, a law professor, whose model ordinance argued that all pornography was exploitive of women and therefore women should be allowed to civilly sue any individual involved in producing, selling, and/or distributing pornographic material. This model was challenged by FACT, which argued in court that censoring pornography was a violation of the United States Constitution's First Amendment clause, which protects freedom of speech.

FACT's politics aimed to frame pornography as a positive and powerful medium for women's equality, especially in the face of a growing global shift towards conservatism. They argued that censoring pornography did not stop it from being made, rather, it only left those involved with no legal protections. Further, they espoused sexual liberation as a tenet of feminism and argued that for women to reach full equality, their sexuality should not be policed.

FACT, as a collective, has been inactive since the late 1980s; however, some members have remained active in the feminist movement.

== FACT's formation and historical context ==
The Feminist Anti-Censorship Task Force (FACT) was founded in 1984 by Ann Barr Snitow, a feminist activist, writer, and teacher. FACT emerged in the United States amid wider feminist debates about pornography, sexuality, and the role of the state in addressing gender inequality. The group formed in response to the 1983 Minneapolis Anti-Pornography Ordinance developed by Andrea Dworkin and Catharine MacKinnon, which aimed to categorize pornography itself as being discriminatory against women and a violation of their Civil Rights. This ordinance generated considerable discussion, prompting some feminists to organize around concerns regarding the legal and constitutional implications of such ordinances.

Notable FACT members include legal scholars, writers, and activists such as Nan D. Hunter and Sylvia A. Law. Several early members engaged in feminist discussions on sexuality, documented in venues such as the 1982 Barnard Conference on Sexuality, which emphasized the complexity of women’s sexual experiences and helped shape the group’s anti-censorship perspective.

Throughout the 1980s, FACT was active within broader national conversations about pornography, regulation, and feminist politics. These contributions positioned FACT as one of several feminist organizations engaging with the legal and political developments that shaped debates on sexuality and state intervention during this period.

=== 1983 Minneapolis Anti-Pornography Ordinance ===
The Minneapolis ordinance set a precedent for both the Indianapolis and Suffolk ordinances that FACT would later legally challenge.

In the early 1980s, the Neighborhood Pornography Taskforce in Minneapolis, MN, was concerned about pornography and believed it was causing a decline in the morality of the community and that it would lower the property values in the area.

In 1983, the organization collaborated with anti-pornography feminists Andrea Dworkin and Catharine MacKinnon and took legal action. Speaking at a Zoning and Planning Committee hearing of the Minneapolis City Council, Dworkin and MacKinnon sought to amend the Minneapolis Civil Rights Ordinance to include pornography as a form of sexual discrimination because it placed women as socially inferior to men, thereby infringing on their civil rights.

This amendment was drafted by Dworkin and MacKinnon, and the draft was presented on November 23, 1983, and had public hearings on December 12 and 13, 1983. The purpose of these hearings was to investigate the relationship between pornography and infringement on women's civil rights. Dworkin and MacKinnon brought significant evidence and ample witness testimony to the hearing to show a link between porn consumption and sexual violence. They drew on feminist ideas in the hearing, and vocally opposed the ordinance. As the first ordinance, it set the precedent for the following ordinances that FACT was vocally opposed to.

While FACT itself was not present at any of the hearings for this ordinance, the group mentioned these hearings in its published works and emphasized the influence the 1983 Minneapolis Anti-Pornography Ordinance had on other ordinances that were critical to shaping their stance against the censorship of pornography.

== FACT's Opposition to the 1984 Indianapolis Anti-Pornography Ordinance ==
=== The Indianapolis Anti-Pornography Ordinance ===
Using the Minneapolis ordinance as a model, the Indianapolis Anti-Pornography Ordinance, signed into law on May 1, 1984, was authored by Andrea Dworkin and Catharine MacKinnon. It was a civil rights ordinance that argued pornography violated women's civil rights based on sex discrimination. In Dworkin and MacKinnon's model ordinance, pornography is defined as, "...the graphic sexually explicit subordination of women through pictures and/or words...". It argued that women had the right to sue the maker(s), seller(s), exhibitor(s), and/or distributor(s) of pornography for damages. This ordinance was challenged as a violation of the United States Constitution's First Amendment clause, which protects freedom of speech.

=== American Booksellers Association, Inc. v. Hudnut ===
American Booksellers Association, Inc. v. Hudnut was a US Court of Appeals for the Seventh Circuit case, argued on June 4, 1985, that challenged the constitutionality of the Indianapolis Anti-Pornography Ordinance (1984). On August 27, 1985, in the majority opinion, Judge Frank Easterbrook ruled that the Indianapolis Anti-Pornography Ordinance was unconstitutional. An amici curiae briefwas written by lawyers and FACT members Nan D. Hunter and Sylvia A. Law on behalf of FACT, the Women's Legal Defense Fund (WLDF), and 80 individual feminists. In their brief, they stated that FACT's analysis of Dworkin and MacKinnon's model ordinance likely influenced Judge Easterbrook's majority opinion. In their analysis, they pointed out the challenge of determining what images liberate women and which subordinate them, something that is mirrored in Judge Easterbrook's opinion. This case was later appealed to the Supreme Court of the United States, which affirmed the lower court's ruling on February 24, 1986, without issuing a separate brief.

== FACT's opposition to the 1984 Suffolk, New York Anti-Pornography Ordinance ==
=== The Suffolk, New York Anti-Pornography Ordinance ===
In 1984, FACT continued its legal opposition against anti-pornography ordinances in Suffolk, New York. They publicly criticized New York Republican legislators Michael D’Andre and Paul Sabatino’s proposed anti-pornography bill in Suffolk County. This proposed bill would allow any citizen in Suffolk County to pursue legal action against creators and/or distributors of “objectionable pornography,” meaning pornography that explicitly displayed the violent sexual subordination of women. This ordinance was similar in nature to both the Indianapolis Anti-Pornography Ordinance and the Minneapolis Anti-Pornography Ordinance.

The ordinance was not widely supported by anti-pornography feminist organizations as it was framed as being right-wing, appealing to morality, familial values, and Christianity, rather than focusing on feminist organizations’ concerns with sexual discrimination, violence, and abuse against women. Further critiques of the ordinance focused on its violation of the United States’ First Amendment clause that protects freedom of speech.

==== Hearing and decision ====
FACT was actively involved in the September 25, 1984, hearing to address the implications of D’Andre’s anti-pornography bill in Riverhead, New York. FACT member and Professor of Social and Cultural Analysis at New York University, Lisa Duggan, spoke on the group's behalf, stating that D’Andre’s proposed, “law doesn’t do anything to stop real violence and pain in women’s lives." Additional FACT members voiced their opposition to this bill, but did not do so as FACT members. These members include, but are not limited to: Nan D. Hunter, who spoke for the American Civil Liberties Union, Carole Vance, who spoke as a Professor at Columbia University School of Public Health, Kate Ellis, who spoke as an English Professor at Rutgers University, and Karen Sauvigne, who spoke as the co-founder of the Working Women's Institute.

On December 26, 1984, D’Andre’s anti-pornography bill was rejected by a vote of 9 to 8 in the Suffolk County Legislature. It was deemed unconstitutional by County Executive Peter F. Cohalan for its violation of free speech.

== Critique of FACT by anti-pornography feminists ==
Pro-pornography feminists (such as FACT) believe pornography is a form of empowerment for women and argue that it does not inherently harm women. Anti-pornography feminists believe that pornography is a violation of women's civil rights due to the culture it perpetuates and the things women in pornography are subjugated to. Many anti-pornography feminists of FACT's time have critiqued FACT for their views and actions.

Critique of Views

One critique of FACT's viewpoints indicates that their goals for feminism simply are not realistic because FACT's feminist goals of gender equality in the workplace, reproductive rights, and public sphere were not furthered by their fighting against ordinances. In fact, anti-porn feminists argue that pornography is harmful to these feminist goals because it promotes the subjugation of women and perpetuates a society that relegates women to a subordinate and submissive role. Other feminists, on the other hand, argue that FACT was not spending enough time and energy on tackling other feminist issues more directly.

Critique of Actions

Some critiques of FACT address its methods. Anti-pornography feminist Lila Lee explains that the ordinances that FACT was attacking were successfully furthering the feminist goal of legal agency for women, and that FACT was doing harm by attacking them. The ordinances provided legal grounds on which victims of pornography could take action, and Lee notes that gender equality has backslid in the years since that legislation was overturned.

Lila Lee also critiques FACT for their treatment of victim testimony at the public hearings they attended. FACT considered the sexual violence victims asked to testify "carefully selected" and "well-prepared," and did not give them credence. Instead of heeding witness testimony, they looked to studies done by male social scientists that did not support a link between pornography and sexual violence and interpreted other social science studies meant to show a link between porn consumption and sexual violence as "inconclusive." Anti-pornography feminists argue that FACT attributed victim testimony to their own "antisexual sentiment"; thus, they erroneously disallow this testimony from acting as evidence against their pre-existing belief that pornography is not a significant factor in rates of sexual violence.

== Dissolution and legacy ==
FACT has served as an organization to represent that feminism is not restricted to solely having an anti-pornography approach, such as anti-pornography and censorship feminists Andrea Dworkin and Catharine MacKinnon proposed. FACT represents the concept that feminism can encompass diverse views regarding pornography's role for feminists. Despite not having one unified stance on pornography within feminism, FACT members were unified in their disagreement with anti-pornography feminists, claiming they speak for all feminists. The acronym of FACT, as FACT advocate Ann Barr Snitow says, "FACT really is about the fact of the danger of simplifying this [pornography] debate."

The majority of FACT's activism has been through its legal oppositions against the 1984 anti-pornography ordinances; Indianapolis and Suffolk County, New York. In 1986, FACT published "Caught Looking: Feminism, Pornography, and Censorship," a collection of articles and essays that critique anti-pornography arguments.

There has been no indication that FACT has organized itself into a formal structure to continue advocacy beyond its legal contributions. FACT likely experienced a natural dissolution over time. Founder Ann Barr Snitnow passed away in 2019, while some of its other key leaders remain active, including Sylvia A. Law, who teaches law at New York University and, in 2024, published an article titled A Half Century of Change, and Nan D. Hunter, who teaches law at Georgetown Law.
