= Feminists Fighting Pornography =

Political activist organization (1983–1997)

Feminists Fighting Pornography (FFP, pronounced /fip/) was a political activist organization against pornography. It advocated for United States Federal legislation to allow lawsuits against the porn industry by women whose attackers were inspired by pornography. FFP was based in New York, N.Y., was founded in 1983 or 1984, and dissolved in 1997.

== Issue positions ==
FFP opposed pornography. It is defined as the sexualized degrading, dominating, humiliating, objectifying, subjugating, violating, annihilating, exploiting, or violence and is distinguished from erotica, which is based on mutuality of power and pleasure. According to FFP founder Page Mellish, pornography provides the training for incest, assault, and rape, results in the objectification of women, affects women's ability to get equal rights and equal pay and encourages men associate sex with violence. Mellish ultimately claimed that all feminist issues were rooted in pornography. In a 1986 letter to the editor of The Wall Street Journal, an FFP member asserted that the members are "not against love and not against sex."

Mellish held all men and women who did not fight against pornography as accountable for violence against women, and claimed that women who enjoyed pornography or rough sex had "internalized the male definition of power".

Positions on pornography have been debated outside of FFP, including with respect to porn's effect on crime and feminist definitions of porn.

== Leadership ==
FFP's founder and organizer was Page Mellish, formerly of the staff of Women Against Pornography, and also formerly of Women Against Pornography and Violence in the Media and National Organization for Women, both of San Francisco, California.

== Legislative agenda ==
Feminists Fighting Pornography supported the Pornography Victims Compensation Act of 1991. Though the bill had some support including from "many feminists", it was not supported by Andrea Dworkin, Catharine MacKinnon, and some other feminists. Supporting the bill, Mellish appeared on a Larry King show, where she credited executed serial killer of women Ted Bundy, who claimed pornography as an influence, with bringing attention to the issue. Under the bill, a person who was attacked after the attacker was substantially spurred by pornography could sue the pornography's producers, publishers, distributors, exhibitors, and sellers without needing a prior criminal charge for the pornography itself. To be pragmatic toward passage, the bill was limited to child pornography and obscene material. The bill has been criticized. FFP also supported an earlier bill, the Pornography Victims Protection Act of 1987, for which FFP listed as endorsers "many [other] women's and children's organizations" and had "signatures of thousands" of bill supporters.

In other legislative matters:

- FFP also supported the anti-pornography civil rights ordinance supported by Andrea Dworkin and Catharine MacKinnon.
- It did not support anti-obscenity laws, because, in FFP's view, they did not address the harm of porn.
- Legislation alone was not a complete solution, according to Page Mellish; it was also necessary to remove "the need for porn".

=== Congressional testimony ===
Page Mellish, testifying to the U.S. Senate Judiciary Committee in 1991 as "a professional activist .... employed ... [by] Feminists Fighting Pornography", stating that the porn industry is large and that "a majority of ... [the] product" of the porn "industry ... either degrades or violates women", spoke on "the real harm of pornography—its proximate cause to violence against women. This causal link was a primary finding of the Attorney General's Commission on Pornography upon examination of research[] which included a Michigan State Police study finding pornography was used or imitated just prior to or during 41 percent of the State's sexual assaults,[] a North Carolina State Police study that found 75 percent of the State's defendants in violent sexual assault cases had hardcore pornography in their homes or vehicles,[] and the FBI's finding that serial killers' most commonly shared trait was extreme pornography use." "The bill's proximate cause on incitement and influence is responsive to a Queen's University study in which 30 percent of sex offenders listed pornography as inciteful, preparatory, and instigative to the crime, and found rapists used pornography more than nonrapists." "[O]ne in four women respondents to Women's [sic] Day magazine ... reported being sexually abused as a direct result of pornographic materials[] .... [A] Yale University study ... found States with the highest pornography consumption had the highest rape rates, and lowest consumption, lowest rape rates." "Seventy-three percent [of "Americans in the Gallup poll in 1985"] affirmed sexual—note that there was no stipulation on violence—affirmed sexual magazines, movies, and books lead some people to commit sexual violence. In a Gallup poll of 1986, 76 percent mandated a ban of magazines containing sexual violence." In the balance of her testimony, she addressed the bill as noncensoring because it imposed "no prior restraint or State empowerment" and criticized the opposition.

Congress is required to have a rational basis for legislation that, without it, might violate a right of a person under the Equal Protection Clause of the U.S. Constitution's 14th Amendment but is not required to validate scientific conclusions to the same degree that may be required in academic science; rather, the legislative reasoning must not be arbitrary. This testimony stated the position in 1991 of Feminists Fighting Pornography and was noted by the American Bar Association's ABA Journal.

== Strategy ==
FFP did not advocate burning porn parlors down, as was done in England, but advocated for men not going to such places. Mellish preferred to organize marches instead, because she believed her ability to be grassroots organizing: "Even bombing porn houses only gets their attention; then we have to change men's view of women, change their idea of power." FFP performed some little crimes, like destroying the ads of the pornographic magazine Penthouse, which advertised in New York City Subway stations. FFP aimed to drive pornography out of stores and theaters, acknowledging that the effect would be to drive it into the underground economy, but not to destroy it completely. Role-reversal, having women view men as mere sex objects, was also not part of their ideology.

== Activism ==
The FFP advocated in a variety of ways:

- Electoral campaigns:
  - It invited people to bring banners to New York Mayoral candidates' headquarters in 1985.
  - It assisted the election campaign of Green for Congress, reporting 100 FFP members doing so, in 1989. Bill Green was a Republican U.S. Representative for a district in Manhattan. He was re-elected that year. During his Congressional career, he introduced The Pornography Victims Protection Act as a bill.
  - Mellish demonstrated in 1992 against United States Senate candidate Geraldine Ferraro on the issue of her husband providing real estate to a pornographer. Whether the demonstration was the organization's is unknown.
- Demonstrations and marches:
  - It marched on 42d Street, Manhattan, on Apr. 8, 1984. At the time, 42d St. was known for its many pornographic businesses.
  - On Oct. 20, 1984, 500 women marched in Times Square under the sponsorship of Feminists Fighting Pornography.
  - On Jan. 13, 1985, held a demonstration objecting to an award to an MTV vice president for contributing to fashion.
  - FFP demonstrated against what they believed to be the district attorney's sexism in a case where a woman was reported as killing her fiancé after he broke down her door.
- Petitions and tabling:
  - In early 1984, FFP collected signatures on a petition protesting a store selling Snuff, the film, on cassette.
  - In 1984, Mellish was tabling daily to educate the public. In 1989, she said that "'[p]eople aren't aware of this [kind of pornography]'". FFP's tabling was sometimes confused by the public as being by Women Against Pornography. One book writer later recalled of 1984 a woman from Feminists Fighting Pornography was tabling in Manhattan and seeking signatures for a petition. "Beside her was a giant blowup of the notorious cover of Hustler that showed a woman's legs sticking out of a meat grinder."
  - In an unknown year, FFP tabled in Washington, D.C.
  - The group was known for openly displaying pornography as part of anti-pornography information tabling. There were "public complaints of their streetcorner display that had nude photos", including that it was "disgusting". In one instance in 1989, Page Mellish and FFP member Dee Vaughan were arrested and jailed, according to The National Law Journal. She said, according to the same newspaper, "'We've been arrested or had our pornography confiscated approximately seven times.'" Despite these reactions, "her group ... keeps setting up shop, hoping, she says, to educate the public", according to the newspaper then. That same year, according to USA Today, Page Mellish and Dee Vaughan asked a state judge to dismiss obscenity charges for the nude photos. Attorney Ron Kuby, then of Bill Kunstler's law firm, provided legal representation, according to The National Law Journal, and the New York Civil Liberties Union (NYCLU), according to the Virginia Law Review, provided legal services (whether on separate cases or together is unknown). The result was that the legal right to display such material was sought and established. American Civil Liberties Union President Nadine Strossen criticized FFP for seeking a right to display pornography while opposing others' doing so.
  - In 1987, in support of the Pornography Victims Protection Act, then a bill, Sen. Specter, as he was introducing it, said FFP "has collected signatures of thousands of concerned individuals supporting passage of this bill."
- Other activism:
  - It named feminist and civil liberties organizations that, according to FFP, had received funding from Playboy Foundation, although it is not clear whether all such organizations applied for or accepted the funds.
  - It offered tours of 42d Street and an FFP slideshow.
  - It called for the boycotting of all stores that sell pornography.
  - FFP was critical of the American Civil Liberties Union with regard to child porn.

== Newsletter and press ==
Its newsletter or magazine was The Backlash Times. It was being published by 1983 or 1984 and continued until at least 1989. The newsletter carried news reports related to pornography generally, such as on assaults, responses, finances, politics, and legislation. It also published images from pornography, for which the group was criticized ("ironically but perhaps necessarily disseminating it ["porn"] further"). In response, the group raised the need to make clear what it was opposing, such as violence against and degradation of women, and thereby distinguish it from what it was not opposing, especially erotica.

In 1992 and after recent favorable "'attention'", Ms. Mellish said, "'[t]he press has censored our movement because the press has a vested interest in the First Amendment'", referring to the First Amendment to the U.S. Constitution and freedoms of speech and press.
