= Rae Langton =

Australian-British philosopher

Rae Langton FBA
- Born: Rae Helen Langton; 14 February 1961 (age 65); Ludhiana, Punjab, India
- Spouse: Richard Holton

Academic background
- Education: University of Sydney; Princeton University
- Thesis: Kantian Humility (1995)
- Doctoral advisor: Margaret Dauler
- Other advisors: Eckart Forster, Simon Blackburn, Frank Cameron Jackson, Michael R. Ayers, Beatrice Longuenesse, James Dreier, Michael Smith, Helga Kuhse, Richard Holton

Academic work
- Era: Contemporary philosophy
- Region: Western philosophy
- School or tradition: Analytic
- Main interests: Kant, feminist philosophy, metaphysics
- Notable ideas: Pornography as speech act

Rae Helen Langton, FBA (born 14 February 1961) is an Australian-British professor of philosophy. She is currently the Knightbridge Professor of Philosophy at the University of Cambridge. She has published widely on Immanuel Kant's philosophy, moral philosophy, political philosophy, metaphysics, and feminist philosophy. She is also well known for her work on pornography and objectification.

== Life, education and career ==
Langton was born in 1961 in Ludhiana, India to David Langton and his wife Valda. A carpenter and a nurse, respectively, they were at the time lay missionaries. She attended Hebron School, Coonoor and Ootacamund, India. In 1980 she moved to Australia and attended the University of New England in Armidale, New South Wales. In 1981 she enrolled at the University of Sydney where she majored in philosophy. There she became interested in Kant. Her Honours thesis argued that Kant's scientific realism did not fit with his idealism. She graduated with First Class Honours in 1986. She was one of a group of women honours graduates at the time encouraged to continue their studies by applying to graduate school in the United States. In 1986 Langton moved to the United States and began graduate work at Princeton University in the philosophy department. While studying social philosophy at Princeton she became interested in the philosophical debates on free speech and pornography.

In 1990, before writing her PhD thesis, Langton moved back to Australia. From 1990–98 she was a Lecturer and Senior Lecturer in the Philosophy department of Monash University in Melbourne.

Langton received her PhD in 1995 from Princeton. Her thesis advisor was Margaret Dauler Wilson; and her thesis topic was Kantian Humility.

In 1998 Langton was a Fellow in the Research School of Social Sciences at the Australian National University. She moved to the United Kingdom in 1998. From 1998 to 1999 she was a lecturer at Sheffield University. From 1999 to 2004 she was Professor of Moral Philosophy at the University of Edinburgh. From 2004 to 2013 she was back in the United States as a Professor in the Department of Linguistics and Philosophy at the Massachusetts Institute of Technology.

In 2012 she was one of several philosophers who submitted evidence to the Leveson Inquiry into press ethics.

She was inducted into the American Academy of Arts and Sciences in October 2013.

In 2013 she joined the Faculty of Philosophy at the University of Cambridge and became a Fellow of Newnham College, Cambridge. In 2014, she was elected a Fellow of the British Academy, the United Kingdom's national academy for the humanities and social sciences. She gave the John Locke Lectures on 'Accommodating Injustice' at Oxford University in 2015.

In 2017 she was appointed to the Knightbridge Professor of Philosophy at Cambridge, the first woman to hold this professorship.

She is married to fellow philosopher Richard Holton.

== Philosophical work ==
In 1990, in response to Ronald Dworkin's Is There a Right to Pornography?, Langton published Whose right? Ronald Dworkin, Women, and Pornographers. In it she argued that the positions Dworkin takes on segregation and affirmative action are not consistent with his position in defence of pornography. The paper was voted one of the ten best articles in philosophy that year. In 1993 she published her paper Speech Acts and Unspeakable Acts.

According to Mary Kate McGowan, "Rather than focus on the harms allegedly caused, Langton explores the hypothesis that pornography actually constitutes harm."

Her first book, Kantian Humility: Our Ignorance of Things in Themselves, is based on her thesis. According to one reviewer, "In this perspective there is no idealism in Kant, rather what Langton calls epistemic humility." Another reviewer described the book as "one of the most original and thought-provoking books on Kant to have appeared for quite some time."

Many of the papers she published from 1990–99 were collected in her 2009 book, Sexual Solipsism: Philosophical Essays on Pornography and Objectification, along with her responses to some of her critics. Regarding this book, Wellesley College philosophy professor Mary Kate McGowan wrote in Notre Dame Philosophical Reviews that "...Langton's crisp, clear, and careful argumentation proves that philosophy has much to offer the socially, politically and even legally charged issues addressed here... This is feminist scholarship at its very best. It's first-rate philosophy." Langton has written more than fifty articles about subjects ranging from feminist approaches to pornography, to animal ethics, to hate speech.

== Awards and honours ==
- Philosophers' Annual, Whose Right? ("top ten" articles of 1990)
- American Academy of Arts and Sciences, inducted October 2013
- Prospect Magazine – 50 World's Top Thinker's 2014
- Elected a Fellow of the British Academy, 2014
- John Locke Lectures, Oxford University, 2015
- Hägerström Lectures, Uppsala University, 2015
- Doctor Honoris Causa, University of Klagenfurt, 2020

== Bibliography ==
- Langton, Rae (2001). Kantian humility : our ignorance of things in themselves. Oxford: Clarendon Press. ISBN 978-0199243174.
- Langton, Rae (2009). Sexual solipsism : philosophical essays on pornography and objectification. Oxford University Press. ISBN 978-0199247066.
- Langton, Rae (Autumn 1993). "Speech acts and unspeakable acts". Philosophy & Public Affairs. 22 (4). Wiley: 293–330. JSTOR 2265469. Pdf.
  - See also: MacKinnon, Catharine A. (1987), "Francis Biddle's sister: pornography, civil rights, and speech", in MacKinnon, Catharine A. (ed.), Feminism unmodified: discourses on life and law, Cambridge, Massachusetts: Harvard University Press, pp. 177, 181 and 193, ISBN 978-0674298743. Preview.
  - See also: Davies, Alex (March 2014). "How to silence content with porn, context and loaded questions". European Journal of Philosophy. 24 (2): 498–522. doi:10.1111/ejop.12075.
- Langton, Rae (January 1999). "Pornography: a liberal's unfinished business". The Canadian Journal of Law and Jurisprudence. 12 (1): 109–33. doi:10.1017/S0841820900002162. S2CID 155880958. Pdf.
- Langton, Rae; West, Caroline (September 1999). "Scorekeeping in a pornographic language game". Australasian Journal of Philosophy. 77 (3): 303–19. doi:10.1080/00048409912349061. Pdf.
  - See also: McGill, Justine (2013), "The silencing of women", in Hutchison, Katrina; Jenkins, Fiona (eds.), Women in philosophy: what needs to change?, New York, New York: Oxford University Press, pp. 197–214, ISBN 978-0199325603. Pdf.
