= Only Words =

Only Words may refer to:

- Only Words, a book by Catharine MacKinnon
- "Only Words", a song from the album Deborah by Debbie Gibson
