= American Booksellers Ass'n v. Hudnut =

Antipornography judgment

- Court: United States Court of Appeals for the Seventh Circuit
- Full case name: American Booksellers Association, Inc. v. William H. Hudnut, Mayor of Indianapolis
- Argued: June 4, 1985
- Decided: August 27, 1985
- Citation: 771 F.2d 323

Case history
- Prior history: 598 F. Supp. 1316 (S.D. Ind. 1984)
- Subsequent history: Rehearing and rehearing en banc denied, Sept. 20, 1985; aff'd mem., 475 U.S. 1001; fees awarded on remand, 650 F. Supp. 324 (S.D. Ind. 1986)

Court membership
- Judges sitting: Richard Dickson Cudahy, Frank H. Easterbrook, Luther Merritt Swygert

Case opinions
- Majority: Easterbrook, joined by Cudahy
- Concurrence: Swygert

Laws applied
- First Amendment

American Booksellers Ass'n v. Hudnut, 771 F.2d 323 (7th Cir. 1985), aff'd mem., 475 U.S. 1001 (1986), was a 1985 court case that successfully challenged the constitutionality of the Antipornography Civil Rights Ordinance, as enacted in Indianapolis, Indiana the previous year.

== Background ==
Indianapolis enacted an ordinance drafted by Catharine MacKinnon and Andrea Dworkin in 1984 defining "pornography" as a practice that discriminates against women. "Pornography" under the ordinance was "the graphic sexually explicit subordination of women, whether in pictures or in words, that also includes one or more of the following:

1. Women are presented as sexual objects who enjoy pain or humiliation; or
2. Women are presented as sexual objects who experience sexual pleasure in being raped; or
3. Women are presented as sexual objects tied up or cut up or mutilated or bruised or physically hurt, or as dismembered or truncated or fragmented or severed into body parts; or
4. Women are presented as being penetrated by objects or animals; or
5. Women are presented in scenarios of degradation, injury abasement, torture, shown as filthy or inferior, bleeding, bruised, or hurt in a context that makes these conditions sexual; or
6. Women are presented as sexual objects for domination, conquest, violation, exploitation, possession, or use, or through postures or positions of servility or submission or display."

The statute provides that the "use of men, children, or transsexuals in the place of women in paragraphs (1) through (6) above shall also constitute pornography under this section".

The case was first heard by the United States District Court for the Southern District of Indiana, which declared the ordinance unconstitutional. Petitioners appealed the case to the United States Court of Appeals for the Seventh Circuit.

== Holding ==
Judge Easterbrook, writing for the court, held that the ordinance's definition and prohibition of "pornography" was unconstitutional. The ordinance did not refer to the prurient interest, as required of obscenity statutes by the Supreme Court in Miller v. California, 413 U.S. 15 (1973). Rather, the ordinance defined pornography by reference to its portrayal of women, which the court held was unconstitutional, as "the First Amendment means that government has no power to restrict expression because of its message [or] its ideas."

== See also ==
- Catharine MacKinnon
- Andrea Dworkin
- Women Against Pornography
- R. v. Butler, [1992] 1 S.C.R. 452
- Anti-pornography movement
