= Richard Holton =

British philosopher

Richard Holton FBA
- Born: 1962 (age 63–64)
- Spouse: Rae Langton

Education
- Education: University College, Oxford (BA), Princeton University (PhD)
- Thesis: Less Work for a Theory of Sense (1995)
- Doctoral advisor: Scott Soames

Philosophical work
- Era: Contemporary philosophy
- Region: Western philosophy
- School: Analytic
- Institutions: University of Cambridge, MIT, Monash, ANU, Sheffield, Edinburgh
- Main interests: Ethics, moral psychology

Richard Holton FBA (born 1962) is a British philosopher and Professor of Philosophy at the University of Cambridge and a fellow of Peterhouse. He is known for his works on moral psychology and action theory. Holton is a Fellow of the British Academy.

== Books ==
- Willing, Wanting, Waiting, Oxford University Press, 2009.
