= Margaret Dauler Wilson =

American philosopher

- Born: 29 January 1939; Pittsburgh, Pennsylvania, U.S.
- Died: 27 August 1998 (aged 59); Princeton, New Jersey, U.S.

Academic background
- Education: Vassar College; Harvard University
- Thesis: Leibniz Doctrine of Necessary Truth (1965)

Margaret Dauler Wilson (29 January 1939 – 27 August 1998) was an American philosopher and a professor of philosophy at Princeton University between 1970 and 1998.

== Biography ==
Born in Pittsburgh, Pennsylvania, Wilson earned an A.B. from Vassar College in 1960 and received her Ph.D. in philosophy from Harvard University five years later. While at Harvard she was a student of Burton Dreben. Wilson was a Woodrow Wilson Fellow at Harvard in 1960–61 and then studied at Oxford University in 1963–64. Wilson spent the early years of her career as an assistant professor of philosophy at Columbia University (1965–1967), and went on to teach at the Rockefeller Institute between 1967 and 1970.

In 1970, Wilson became the first female member of faculty in the philosophy department at Princeton when she was appointed as an associate professor of philosophy. Wilson was promoted to full professor in 1975, and in 1998 was finally named Stuart Professor of Philosophy. During her tenure at Princeton she shared a department with other prominent philosophers including David Lewis, Saul Kripke, Harry Frankfurt, Gil Harman, Bas van Fraassen, Paul Benacerraf and Richard Jeffrey. (She can be seen pictured with many of the same in a 1979 faculty photograph hosted online by the department).

Wilson taught courses in Descartes, Spinoza and Leibniz, Locke, Berkeley and other early modern philosophers as well as the Philosophy of Religion. In her scholarship, Wilson focused on the history of early modern philosophy, the philosophy of religion, the philosophy of mind, and the theory of perception. Author of Descartes (1978), as well as of many articles on 17th and 18th-century metaphysics and epistemology, some of which are collected in her, Ideas and Mechanism (1999), Wilson was also editor of The Essential Descartes (1969) and co-editor (with D. Brock and R. Kuhns) of Philosophy: An Introduction (1972).

Margaret Wilson has been described as "the most eminent English-language historian of early modern philosophy of her generation" was awarded many honors over the course of her distinguished career, and was among only a handful of prominent female philosophers in a field overwhelmingly dominated by men. Wilson won a Guggenheim fellowship in 1977 and an American Council of Learned Societies fellowship in 1982. She was also a Centennial Medalist of the Harvard Graduate School of Arts and Sciences in 1989, and was elected a fellow of the American Academy of Arts and Sciences in 1992. In 1994, Wilson received Princeton University's Howard T. Behrman Award for distinguished achievement in the humanities.

Active in professional organizations, Wilson served as vice-president of the Eastern Division of the American Philosophical Association (APA) for 1993-94 and for 1994–95. She also served on a number of APA committees, including the Subcommittee on the Status of Women in the Profession. President of the Leibniz Society of North America from 1985 to 1990, she was a member of numerous other associations, such as the Hobbes Society, the Hume Society, the North American Spinoza Society and the British Society for the History of Philosophy. Wilson served as a juror for the Arts and Humanities for the 1997 Heinz Foundation awards.

Wilson died at the age of 59 on August 27, 1998.

Since 2002, the Margaret Dauler Wilson Biennial Philosophy Conference has been held in her honor and in 2016, the Department of Philosophy at Princeton University began an occasional series of lectures in her name. The inaugural lecture was given by Christia Mercer, one of several of Wilson's former students who themselves went on to become prominent philosophers, others include Janet Broughton, Lisa J. Downing, Rae Langton, and Eileen O'Neill.
