= Ann Barr Snitow =

American feminist activist, writer, and teacher (1943–2019)

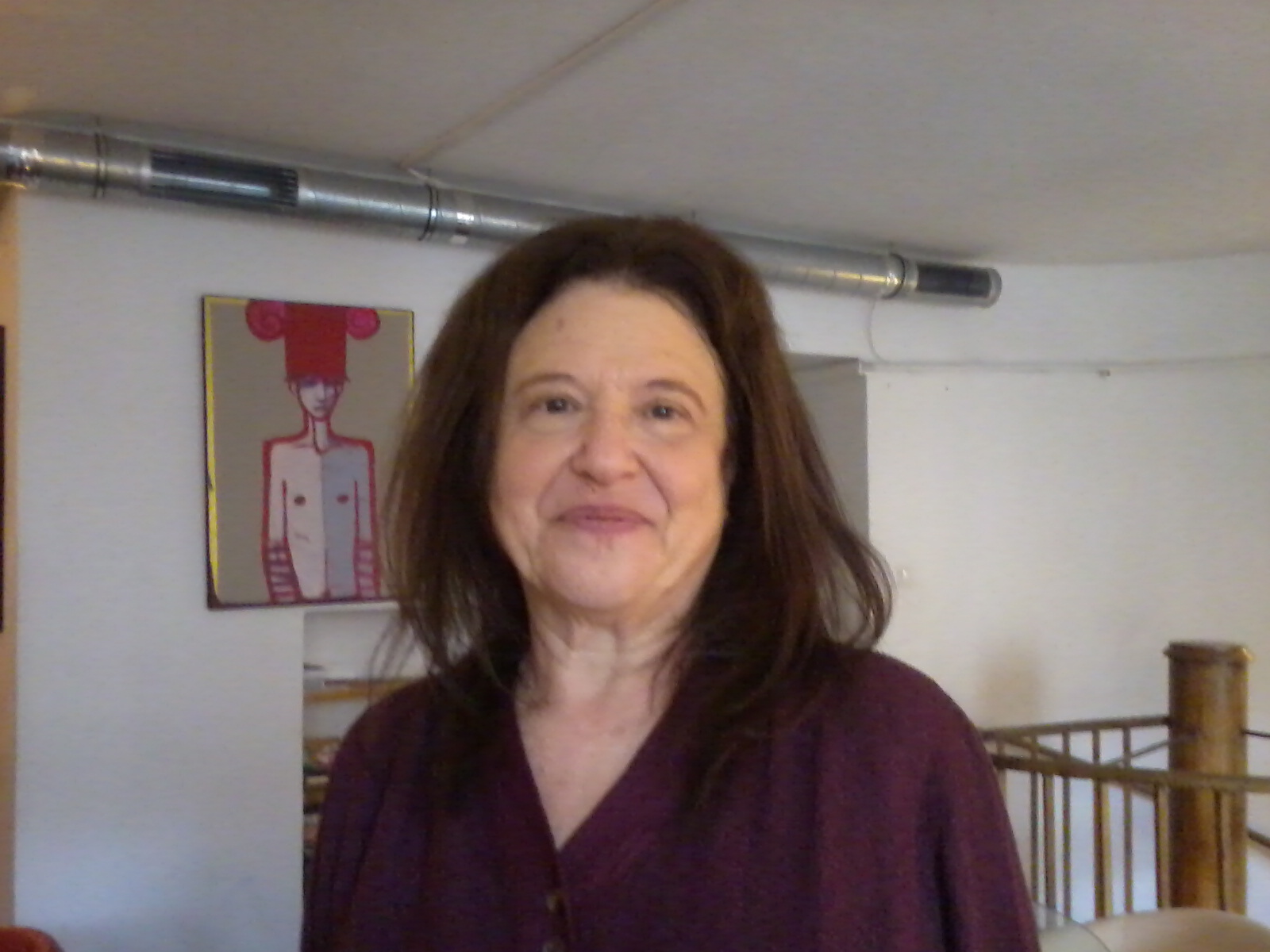
- in 2011
- Born: May 8, 1943; Manhattan, New York City, U.S.
- Died: August 10, 2019 (aged 76); Manhattan, New York City
- Occupations: Feminist activist, writer, teacher

Ann Barr Snitow (/ˈsnɪtaʊ/; May 8, 1943 – August 10, 2019) was an American feminist activist, writer and teacher. She was a co-founder of the New York Radical Feminists, and the author and co-editor of several books.

== Early life and education ==
Snitow was born in New York City to a Jewish family. Her father Charles Snitow was born in Hell's Kitchen, Manhattan, the son of Russian-Jewish immigrants Aaron Snitow and Mary Sackowitz. Her mother Virginia Snitow was born in Brooklyn to Louis Levitt of Kiev and Tillie (Toba) Rosenberg of Huși, Romania. Virginia served as President of American Jewish Congress' Women's Division and was an activist in the feminist, anti-racist, and anti-war movements.

Snitow earned her undergraduate degree in English at Cornell University in 1965, then began studying for a doctorate at the University of London. She left her studies in 1968, drawn home by political uprising; she ultimately earned her doctorate in 1979.

== Career ==
Snitow became a founding member of the New York Radical Feminists in 1969 with her friend Ellen Willis.

In the 1970s she became known for her talks on the not for profit New York radio show Womankind on WBAI.

She was a serial movement founder. In 1977 she founded CARASA to campaign against sterilisation and for the right to abortion.

Snitow taught English literature at Manhattan's New School for Social Research in Manhattan during the 1980s, where she established gender studies as another course. In 1981 she gathered together people to form No More Nice Girls, a feminist street theatre group whose message was pro abortion and to uncover female sexuality. Three years later she founded the similarly themed "FACT" which tried to reduce the impact of anti-pornography campaigners. Snitow's approach was summarised as "Pro-sex" as she did not want to see more censorship. In 1983 she brought together her thoughts about feminist sexuality, anti-pornography and prostitution in an essay titled "Powers of Desire: The Politics of Sexuality".

In 1998 she turned historian to recall "The Feminist Memoir Project" about her work.

In 2002 she founded the group "Take Back the Future".

In 2015 she published "The Feminism of Uncertainty (2015)" which gathered together her lifetime of essays. Snitow died in 2019.

Snitow's papers are at Eugene Lang College The New School for Liberal Arts where Snitow was a professor of literature and gender studies.

== Personal life and death ==
Snitow’s partner from 1977 until her death was Daniel Goode; they married in 2004. Snitow died of bladder cancer in New York in 2019.

Soon after her death, a prize was created in her honor. The Ann Snitow Prize aims to award "a feminist intellectual and activist, living and working in the United States, who has consistently exhibited the qualities that led Ann to be so admired and cherished." Awardees include Premilla Nadasen, Sarah Schulman, Mariame Kaba, and Shariana Ferrer-Núñez.

== Founding member of... ==
- New York Radical Feminists in 1969
- CARASA (Committee for Abortion Rights and Against Sterilization Abuse), 1977
- "No More Nice Girls", 1981, a feminist street theater group focused primarily on abortion and sexuality;
- FACT (Feminist Anti-Censorship Taskforce), 1984, opposing the feminist anti-pornography movement
- Network of East-West Women, 1991, with Katha Pollitt, among several others, including Ellen Willis
- Take Back the Future, 2002

== Selected works ==
- Snitow, Ann Barr; Stansell, Christine; Thompson, Sharon, eds. (1983). Powers of Desire: The Politics of Sexuality. New York: Monthly Review Press. ISBN 9789350020203.
- DuPlessis, Rachel Blau; Snitow, Ann Barr, eds. (1998). The Feminist Memoir Project: Voices from Women's Liberation. New York: Three Rivers Press. ISBN 9780813539737.
- Snitow, Ann Barr (2015). The Feminism of Uncertainty: A Gender Diary. Durham, N.C.: Duke University Press. ISBN 9780822375678. OCLC 914715351.
- Snitow, Ann Barr (2020). Visitors: An American Feminist in East Central Europe. New York: New Village Press. ISBN 9781613321300.
