= Only Words (book) =

1993 book by Catharine MacKinnon

- Author: Catharine MacKinnon
- Language: English
- Subject: Pornography
- Publisher: Harvard University Press
- Publication date: 1993
- Media type: Print (hardcover and paperback)
- ISBN: 978-0-674-63933-1

Only Words is a 1993 book by Catharine MacKinnon. In this work of feminist legal theory, MacKinnon contends that the U.S. legal system has used a First Amendment basis to protect intimidation, subordination, terrorism, and discrimination as enacted through pornography, violating the equal protection guarantee of the Fourteenth Amendment.

== Overview ==
Only Words was originally presented as the Christian Gauss Memorial Lectures in Criticism in April 1992 at Princeton University, and were later developed and clarified at the Columbia Legal Theory workshop and at the Owen Fiss Feminist Legal Theory class at Yale University.

It is divided into three discussions: (1) Defamation and Discrimination, (2) Racial and Sexual Harassment, and (3) Equality and Speech.

=== Defamation and discrimination ===
MacKinnon argues that women's reality of systemic subordination is just that: real, not an abstract representation mediated through pornography or academic deconstruction. In support of this contention, she points out, "Thirty-eight percent of women are sexually molested as girls; twenty-four percent of women are raped in their marriages. Nearly half of women are raped or are the victims of attempted rape at some time during their lives. Eighty-five percent of women who work outside the home are sexually harassed by their employers." According to MacKinnon, however, pornography was categorized as protected speech "before its production required the use of real women's bodies." As a consequence, the law erases harm and renames it speech, an approach, she continues, which "relies centrally on putting it back into the context of the silenced and violated women: from real abuse back to an idea." The effect is to treat pornography as defamation rather than discrimination; pornography becomes merely "offensive speech," only words that express something "metaphorical or magical, rhetorical or unreal, a literary hyperbole or propaganda device."

MacKinnon rejects this approach, pointing out that bribery, price-fixing under anti-trust laws, and sexual harassment speech are all "only words," but they are not constitutionally protected and prohibited by law. Likewise, a "White Only" sign is "only words," but it not treated merely as offensive speech but as an act of segregation and discrimination. Pornography, MacKinnon contends, enacts discrimination in exactly the same way.

MacKinnon insists that pornography is not what it says, but what it does: "What pornography does, it does in the real world, not only in the mind." She elaborates:

It is the pornography industry, not the ideas in the materials, that forces, threatens, blackmails, pressures, tricks, and cajoles women into sex for pictures. In pornography, women are gang raped in order to be filmed. They are not gang raped by the idea of a gang rape. It is for pornography, and not the ideas in it, the women are hurt and penetrated, tied and gagged, undressed and genitally spread and sprayed with lacquer and water so sex pictures can be made. Only for pornography are women killed to make a sex movie, and it is not the idea of a sex killing that kills them. It is unnecessary to do any of these things to express, as ideas, the ideas pornography expresses. It is essential to do them to make pornography.

MacKinnon proceeds to argue that abuse and coercion need not be present in the production of all pornography in order to restrict it, for all pornography is made under conditions of inequality based on sex. Based on this analysis, she proposes a law against pornography, developed with Andrea Dworkin, that defines it as "graphic sexually explicit materials that subordinate women through pictures or words." Illegality is necessary, MacKinnon continues, because "in the context of social inequality, so-called speech can be an exercise in power which constructs the social reality in which people live, from objectification to genocide." For instance, "requiring Jews to wear yellow stars" is symbolic expression, but because the idea is itself part of the discriminatory pattern, it is not harmless speech. Likewise, cross burning acts only through the content of its expression, but is illegal because it performs discrimination.

=== Racial and sexual harassment ===
In Part II, MacKinnon extends her analysis of speech acts to the realm of sexual harassment. She writes, "Although all sexual harassment is words, pictures, meaningful acts and gestures, it has been legally understood on the basis of what it does: discriminate on the basis of sex." Harassment is not the expression of ideas but the enactment of discrimination. MacKinnon adduces the example that "courts have not taken chanting 'cunt' at a working woman as conveying the idea 'you have a vagina,' or as expressing eroticism, but rather as pure abuse." She argues, further, that abuse need not be directed at a specific individual in order to constitute harassment; rather, group-based attacks are directed instead at every one individual within that group: "Does any Black man doubt, upon encountering "Nigger Die" at work, that it means him?"

MacKinnon introduces race into her analysis both as an analogy and a reality of discrimination, which she says is indistinguishable from sex discrimination in the way it functions. Moreover, the similarities in their function can be seen in the pervasiveness of the confluence of sex and race discrimination: "Examples include: 'Jew faggot,' 'Black bitches suck cock,' 'Niggers are the living evidence that the Indians screwed buffalo,' and the endless references to the penis size of African-American men." MacKinnon insists the judiciary has been inconsistent and illogical in punishing race discrimination while permitting sex discrimination to go unchallenged.

=== Equality and Speech ===
In the final section, MacKinnon describes equality and freedom of speech as "on a collision course." "More precisely," she continues,"the First Amendment has grown as if a commitment to speech were no part of a commitment to equality and as if a commitment to equality had no implications for the law of speech--as if the upheaval that produced the Reconstruction Amendments did not move the ground under the expressive freedom, setting new limits and mandating new extensions, perhaps even demanding reconstruction of the speech right itself." The core problem, in MacKinnon's view, is "the substantial lack of recognition that some people get a lot more speech than others," allowing the power distribution to become "more exclusive, coercive, and violent as it has become more and more legally protected." As long as the Fourteenth and First Amendments are interpreted "negatively"—that is, prohibiting violations by government—instead of "chartering legal intervention for social change," inequality of power will continue to persist or deepen.

== Reception ==
=== Popular press ===
Writing in The New York Times, Michiko Kakutani describes MacKinnon's style as "exaggerated, defensive, and willfully sensationalistic." Kakutani describes MacKinnon's thesis as "an all-out-attack on the First Amendment", and points out that under MacKinnon's legal framework, Madonna videos, Calvin Klein ads, and movies like Basic Instinct could all be subject to censorship. Kakutani adds that the statistics cited by MacKinnon are "highly debatable", and questions her "portrayal of women as helpless victims coerced by sadistic men." In the United Kingdom, The Independent derided Only Words for its insistence "immemorial victim status for all females", its "lurid and unsupported statistics", and its "contemptuous handling of other individuals' freedom of choice."

In the conservative magazine The New Criterion, Roger Kimball criticizes "MacKinnon's tendency to treat her central categories as infinitely elastic metaphors," and her "breathtakingly simplistic and reductive view of human behavior." Kimball finds particularly disturbing her proposal of "a sweeping program of censorship that would restrict not only pornography but also 'materials that promote inequality.'"

Writing for The New Republic, American jurist and philosopher Richard Posner writes that Only Words contains "no nuance, qualification, measure, or sense of proportion". Posner points out that MacKinnon "ignores extensive counterevidence" to her claim that pornography causes harm, namely from studies in Denmark and Japan. Finally, Posner suggests MacKinnon misses a crucial difference between verbal sexual harassment and pornography: in the former, the words are aimed at a target of abuse, while in the latter, they are "aimed at a man, and the aim is to please, not to insult or intimidate." He concludes, "I do not know what has caused MacKinnon to become, and, more surprisingly, to remain, so obsessed with pornography, and so zealous for censorship. But let us not sacrifice our civil liberties on the altar of her obsession."

In a controversial review printed in The Nation, Carlin Romano invites readers to follow along as he fantasizes about raping Catharine MacKinnon, and closes his review by calling her an "authoritarian in the guise of a progressive." In response from its readers, The Nation received an unusually high volume of mail, multiple subscription cancellations, and calls from two antirape groups for an apology, which it did not issue. In Time magazine, MacKinnon reported that she was in fact raped by Carlin Romano's review.

Prominent law professor Ronald Dworkin reviewed MacKinnon's book for The New York Review of Books, arguing, first, that she fails to establish a causal relationship between pornography and rape: "In spite of MacKinnon’s fervent declarations, no reputable study has concluded that pornography is a significant cause of sexual crime: many of them conclude, on the contrary, that the causes of violent personality lie mainly in childhood, before exposure to pornography can have had any effect, and that desire for pornography is a symptom rather than a cause of deviance." He finds her empirical evidence of wartime rapes of Croatian and Muslim women by Serbian soldiers equally flawed. Dworkin also rejects MacKinnon's argument that women have not only a constitutional right to free speech, but a "right to circumstances that encourage one to speak, and a right that others grasp and respect what one means to say." Dworkin notes that no one would demand such a right for "flat-earthers and bigots". Dworkin further notes that laws already exist to prosecute women who are coerced into making pornography, and further, "economic injustice in America is no reason for depriving poor women of an economic opportunity some of them may prefer to the available alternatives." Dworkin also contends that speech codes at universities exist to "protect the reflective atmosphere of the institution," not to enforce an egalitarian ideal. He concludes that MacKinnon's legal goals turn transform equality into a "euphemism for tyranny." MacKinnon responded to Dworkin's critique, arguing that her Indianapolis Ordinance made "behavior, not thoughts, actionable," that the law should "stop sexists and bigots," and that Dworkin himself is representative of men who oppress women. Dworkin, in turn, replied that he could find "no genuine argument" in her claim that pornography is itself rape, that her proposal to "stop" bigots was "chilling," and that "sensationalism, hyperbole, and bad arguments" undermine the cause of equality.

In contrast, Susan Salter Reynolds of the Los Angeles Times praised Only Words for "lighting a fire under the complacent acceptance of pornography and inequality, racial and sexual, in this country."

=== Academic reviews ===
The Harvard Law Review rejects MacKinnon's main thesis: "The sexual abuse of women who participate in pornographic works cannot provide the basis for banning adult pornography", as "adult women must be presumed competent to consent to their participation in pornographic works." Moreover, the review argues against the idea that mere economic constraints on women's choices "should invalidate the consent of all women involved in pornography", for this would have "disturbing implications in other contexts for women". The review concludes, "MacKinnon's style is meant to shock, but her substance is unable to persuade."

James McHugh concludes, "The most profound problem experienced within this book is the lack of a specific and consistent distinction between the concepts of "pornography," which refers to sexually explicit expressions that are harmful in some sense, and "erotica," which refers to sexually explicit expressions that are not strictly harmful." Her attempt to do so is "too unqualified to be sustained."

Ellen Willis, a longtime opponent of MacKinnon's effort to suppress pornography, writes that MacKinnon's "inability to see women as exercising even limited autonomy leads to the sort of cognitive dissonance whereby MacKinnon can declare women to be definitively silenced, even as she herself is an outspoken and influential public figure." Susan Fraiman claims MacKinnon's "ideal society" is "deficient in imagination," and worries about MacKinnon's alliance with the Moral Majority and its goal to "persecute sexual dissidents."

Leora Tanenbaum laments MacKinnon's "notorious alliance with conservative politicians," who simply find pornography "obscene and immoral, without considering the oppression of women." Tanenbaum notes that MacKinnon misrepresents the prevalence of violence and abuse. The most comprehensive study, published in The Journal of Communication, shows that less than five percent of pornography contains simulated violence. Moreover, Tanenbaum challenges MacKinnon's assumption that "all porn models and actresses are coerced by their male employers," noting many women express satisfaction with their work and even direct their own movies.

C. Edwin Baker suggests that MacKinnon's political and cultural agenda has already been adequately refuted, but proposes to refute her constitutional arguments as well: "The lack of an adequately specified constitutional mandate permits the theory to be easily manipulated to justify censorship of whatever views the majority decides should be suppressed." Hence, MacKinnon effectively empowers a tyranny of the majority, which is particularly troubling given her belief that male power is inscribed in law. Moreover, Baker suggests that not all harm justifies an abrogation of the First Amendment: "If speech is to receive protection as a fundamental right, the premise must be that some ways of causing harm--especially the characteristic way that speech causes harm--do not justify limiting liberty."

In The Threepenny Review, Stuart Klawans writes of Only Words, "Our initial sympathy gives way to discomfort, then pity, then (after a few false hopes) the bleakest horror and despair." He calls her most basic claims "unbounded by fact." For instance, Klawans adduces the first sentence of the book: "Imagine that for hundreds of years your most formative traumas, your daily suffering and pain, the abuse you live through, the terror you live with, are unspeakable--not the basis of literature." He then points out that Sophocles' Antigone, Euripides' Medea, Shakespeare's Measure for Measure, Kleist's Marquise of O--, and George Eliot's Middlemarch all contain "women who, though abused, face off against male power."
