= Antipornography Civil Rights Ordinance =

Several proposed local ordinances in the US

The Anti-pornography Civil Rights Ordinance (also known as the Dworkin–MacKinnon Anti-pornography Civil Rights Ordinance or Dworkin–MacKinnon Ordinance) is a name for several proposed local ordinances in the United States and that was closely associated with the anti-pornography radical feminists Andrea Dworkin and Catharine A. MacKinnon. It proposed to treat pornography as a violation of women's civil rights and to allow women harmed by pornography to seek damages through lawsuits in civil courts. The approach was distinguished from traditional obscenity law, which attempts to suppress pornography through the use of prior restraint and criminal penalties.

The ordinances were originally written in 1983 by Andrea Dworkin and Catharine MacKinnon, and supported by many (but not all) of their fellow members of the feminist anti-pornography movement. Versions of the ordinance were passed in several cities in the United States during the 1980s, but were blocked by city officials and struck down by courts, who found it to violate the freedom of speech protections of the First Amendment to the United States Constitution.

== History ==
The idea of combating pornography through civil rights litigation in the United States was first developed in 1980. Linda Boreman, who had appeared in the pornographic film Deep Throat as "Linda Lovelace," published a memoir, Ordeal, in which she stated that she had been beaten and raped by her ex-husband Chuck Traynor, and violently coerced into making Deep Throat. Boreman held a press conference, with Andrea Dworkin, feminist lawyer Catharine MacKinnon, and members of Women Against Pornography supporting her, in which she made her charges public for the press corps. Dworkin, MacKinnon, and Gloria Steinem began discussing the possibility of legal redress for Boreman under federal civil rights law. Two weeks later, they met with Boreman to discuss the idea of pursuing a lawsuit against Traynor and other pornographers. She was interested, but Steinem discovered that the statute of limitations for a possible suit had passed, and Boreman backed off (Brownmiller 337). Dworkin and MacKinnon, however, began to discuss the possibility of civil rights litigation as an approach to combatting pornography.

In the fall of 1983, MacKinnon secured a one-semester appointment for Dworkin at the University of Minnesota, to teach a course in literature for the Women's Studies program and co-teach (with MacKinnon) an interdepartmental course on pornography. Hearing about the course, community activists from south Minneapolis contacted Dworkin and MacKinnon to ask for their help in curbing the rise of pornography shops. Dworkin and MacKinnon explained their idea for a new civil rights approach to pornography, which would define pornography as a civil rights violation against women, and allow women who had been harmed by pornography to sue the producers and distributors in civil court for damages. The Minneapolis city council hired Dworkin and MacKinnon as consultants to help the city find an approach to deal with pornography. Public hearings were held by the city council, with testimony from Linda Boreman, Ed Donnerstein (a pornography researcher from the University of Wisconsin–Madison), and Pauline Bart, a radical feminist professor from Chicago. The ordinance was passed on December 30, 1983, but vetoed by Mayor Donald M. Fraser (who opposed the idea on its merits and also claimed that the city ought not get involved in litigation over the ordinance's constitutionality). The ordinance was passed a second time in July 1984, and was vetoed again by Fraser. In the interim, the city council in Indianapolis invited Dworkin and MacKinnon to draft a similar ordinance, and also held public hearings. A different version of the ordinance, rewritten to focus specifically on pornography that depicted violence, was passed by the Indianapolis city council and signed into law by Mayor William Hudnut on May 1, 1984. However, the law was quickly challenged in court, and overturned as unconstitutional by the Seventh Circuit Court of Appeals's ruling on American Booksellers v. Hudnut. The Supreme Court denied to hear the case, thus leaving the ordinance unconstitutional. The case is often cited as an important decision on freedom of speech as applied to pornography.

In spite of the defeat in the courts, Dworkin, MacKinnon, and some other feminists continued to advocate versions of the civil rights ordinance, organizing campaigns to place it on the ballot as a voter initiative in Cambridge, Massachusetts, in 1985 (where it was voted down in the referendum 58%–42%), and then again in Bellingham, Washington, in 1988 (where it was passed). The American Civil Liberties Union filed suit against the city of Bellingham after the ordinance was passed, and the federal court again struck the law down on First Amendment grounds.

Feminists were strongly divided over the anti-pornography ordinance. Some feminists, such as Wendy McElroy, Ellen Willis, Wendy Kaminer and Susie Bright, opposed anti-pornography feminism on principle, identifying with sex-positive feminist position in the feminist sex wars of the 1980s. Many anti-pornography feminists supported the legislative efforts, but others—including Susan Brownmiller and Janet Gornick—agreed with Dworkin and MacKinnon's critique of pornography, but opposed the attempt to combat it through legislative campaigns, which they feared would be rendered ineffectual by the courts, would violate principles of free speech, or would harm the anti-pornography movement by taking organizing energy away from education and direct action and entangling it in political squabbles (Brownmiller 318–321).

== Butler decision in Canada ==
In 1992, the Supreme Court of Canada made a ruling in R. v. Butler (the Butler decision) which incorporated some elements of Dworkin and MacKinnon's legal approach to pornography into the existing Canadian obscenity law. In Butler the Court held that Canadian obscenity law violated Canadian citizens' rights to free speech under the Canadian Charter of Rights and Freedoms if enforced on grounds of morality or community standards of decency; but that obscenity law could be enforced constitutionally against some pornography on the basis of the Charter's guarantees of sex equality. The Court's decision cited extensively from briefs prepared by the Women's Legal Education and Action Fund (LEAF), with the support and participation of Catharine MacKinnon. Andrea Dworkin opposed LEAF's position, arguing that feminists should not support or attempt to reform criminal obscenity law. In 1993, copies of Dworkin's book Pornography were held for inspection by Canadian customs agents, fostering an urban legend that Dworkin's own books had been banned from Canada under a law that she herself had promoted. However, the Butler decision did not adopt Dworkin and MacKinnon's ordinance; MacKinnon and Dworkin claimed that holding Dworkin's books (which were released shortly after they were inspected) was a standard procedural measure, unrelated to the Butler decision.

== Definition of pornography in the ordinance ==
Dworkin and MacKinnon placed special emphasis on the legal definition of pornography provided in the civil rights ordinance. The civil rights ordinance characterizes pornography as a form of "sex discrimination" and defines "pornography" as "the graphic sexually explicit subordination of women through pictures and/or words," when combined with one of several other conditions. In the "model ordinance" that they drafted, Dworkin and MacKinnon gave the following legal definition:

1. "Pornography" means the graphic sexually explicit subordination of women through pictures and/or words that also includes one or more of the following:

a. women are presented dehumanized as sexual objects, things or commodities; or
b. women are presented as sexual objects who enjoy humiliation or pain; or
c. women are presented as sexual objects experiencing sexual pleasure in rape, incest, or other sexual assault; or
d. women are presented as sexual objects tied up or cut up or mutilated or bruised or physically hurt; or
e. women are presented in postures or positions of sexual submission, servility, or display; or
f. women's body parts—including but not limited to vaginas, breasts, or buttocks—are exhibited such that women are reduced to those parts; or
g. women are presented being penetrated by objects or animals; or
h. women are presented in scenarios of degradation, humiliation, injury, torture, shown as filthy or inferior, bleeding, bruised or hurt in a context that makes these conditions sexual.

2. The use of men, children, or transsexuals in the place of women in (a)–(h) of this definition is also pornography for purposes of this law.
—Andrea Dworkin and Catharine A. MacKinnon, "Model Antipornography Civil-Rights Ordinance," Pornography and Civil Rights: A New Day for Women's Equality, Appendix D

== Causes for action ==
Each version of the ordinance provided different causes for action under which women could file sex discrimination suits related to pornography.

The original version of the ordinance passed in Minneapolis, the Indianapolis ordinance, and the proposed Cambridge ordinance each recognized four causes for action that could justify a sex discrimination suit:

- Trafficking in pornography, defined as the production, sale, exhibition, or distribution of pornographic materials. Making pornography available for study in government-funded public libraries and public or private university libraries was exempted from being considered discrimination by trafficking. Any woman could claim a cause for action against the trafficker(s) as a woman acting against the subordination of women. Men or transsexuals who alleged injury by pornography in the way that women are injured by it could also sue.
- Coercion into pornographic performances. Any person coerced, intimidated, or fraudulently induced into pornography could sue the maker(s), seller(s), exhibitor(s), or distributor(s), both for damages and to have the product or products of the performances eliminated from public view. The law stated that a number of specific factors, including past sexual history, other involvement in prostitution or pornography, the appearance of cooperation during the performance, or payment for the performance, could not be used (by themselves, without further evidence) as evidence against a claim of coercion.
- Forcing pornography on a person in a home, workplace, school, or public place. Any person who has pornography forced on her or him could sue the perpetrator and the institution.
- Assault or physical attack due to pornography. The victim of an assault, physical attack, or injury "directly caused by specific pornography" could seek damages from the maker(s), distributor(s), seller(s), and/or exhibitor(s) of the pornography, and an injunction against the further exhibition, distribution, or sale of that specific pornography.

The Model Ordinance that Dworkin and MacKinnon advocated in Pornography and Civil Rights: A New Day for Women's Equality (1988), and the version of the ordinance passed in Bellingham, Washington, the same year, added a fifth cause of action in addition to these four:

- Defamation through pornography, defined as defaming any person (including public figures) through the unauthorized use of their proper name, image, or recognizable personal likeness in pornography, and allowing for authorization, if given, to be revoked in writing at any time prior to the publication of the pornography.

== Criticism ==
The most vocal critic of Mackinnon and (Andrea) Dworkin's rights-based approach to pornography is Ronald Dworkin (of no relation), who rejects the argument that the private consumption of pornography can be said to be a breach of women's civil rights. Ronald Dworkin states that the Ordinance rests on the "frightening principle that considerations of equality require that some people not be free to express their tastes or convictions or preferences anywhere." Ronald Dworkin also argues that the logic underpinning the Ordinance would threaten other forms of free speech.

== See also ==
- Attorney General's Commission on Pornography
- American Booksellers v. Hudnut

== Bibliography ==
- Text of American Booksellers v. Hudnut, 771 F.2d 323 (7th Cir. 1985) is available from: OpenJurist Boston College UMKC Harvard University
- Brownmiller, Susan (1999). In our time: memoir of a revolution. New York: Dial Press. ISBN 9780385314862. Details.
- Dworkin, Andrea; MacKinnon, Catharine (1988). Pornography and civil rights: a new day for women's equality. Minneapolis, Minnesota: Organizing Against Pornography. ISBN 9780962184901. Available online.
- Dworkin, Andrea (1997), "Beaver talks", in Dworkin, Andrea (ed.), Life and death: unapologetic writings on the continuing war against women, London: Virago, pp. 90–95, ISBN 9781860493607.
- Dworkin, Andrea (1997), "Pornography happens", in Dworkin, Andrea (ed.), Life and death: unapologetic writings on the continuing war against women, London: Virago, pp. 134–137, ISBN 9781860493607.
- MacKinnon, Catharine A. (November 1991). "Pornography as defamation and discrimination". Boston University Law Review. 71 (5): 793–818. Pdf.
- MacKinnon, Catharine A. (1987), "Francis Biddle's sister: pornography, civil rights, and speech", in MacKinnon, Catharine A. (ed.), Feminism unmodified: discourses on life and law, Cambridge, Massachusetts: Harvard University Press, pp. 177, 181 and 193, ISBN 9780674298743. Preview.

See also: Langton, Rae (Autumn 1993). "Speech acts and unspeakable acts". Philosophy & Public Affairs. 22 (4): 293–330. JSTOR 2265469. Pdf.
See also: Davies, Alex (March 2014). "How to silence content with porn, context and loaded questions". European Journal of Philosophy. 24 (2): 498–522. doi:10.1111/ejop.12075. (Online version before inclusion in an issue.)
