= Pornography Victims Compensation Act =

1991 proposed United States law

The Pornography Victims Compensation Act of 1991 was a bill, S. 983, in the U.S. Congress. The sponsor in the Senate was Senator Mitch McConnell with eight cosponsors. A Senate committee held hearings on the bill. The bill was not voted on, did not pass, and did not become law.

== Legislative substance ==
Under the bill, a person who was attacked after the attacker was substantially spurred by pornography could have been able to sue the pornography's producers, publishers, distributors, exhibitors, and sellers without needing a prior criminal charge against the pornography itself. It was written not to prohibit any publication, but to hold liable for certain consequences, according to McConnell. For political pragmatism, the bill was limited to child pornography and obscene material, that being already unprotected by the U.S. Constitution's First Amendment.

As part of the rationale for passage, McConnell argued "that crime is fostered by a culture in which the sexual degradation, abuse, and murder of women and children are a form of entertainment", that "[t]he connection between the amount of violent entertainment and the amount of real-life violence is no longer seriously doubted among social scientists," that "more than one million children from six months to sixteen years old are sexually molested and then filmed or photographed", and that "[p]ornography is fueling violence in this country".

== Title ==
The formal title varied by year, as listed in the History section, below.

Informally, it was known as the Bundy Bill, after serial murderer Ted Bundy, who attributed his killings partly to porn.

== History ==
The bill or versions of it had been under congressional consideration for several years prior. Earlier versions reached a wider range of pornography but had less support; narrowing that range to what was unprotected by Supreme Court decisions on the First Amendment led to wider support.

Other versions, searched for as introduced from approximately 1973 to part of 2010, included these:

- Pornography Victims Protection Act of 1984, S. 3063 in the Senate, introduced by Sen. Arlen Specter with no cosponsors. Hearings were held and, according to Sen. Specter, "[w]itnesses disagreed sharply about the general social effects of such [pornographic] materials. Some, such as Andrea Dworkin and Catherine [sic] MacKinnon, claimed that violent pornography is central to gender unequally [sic] in our society. Others, including Barry Lynn of the American Civil Liberties Union, denied that such a broad factual claim has been conclusively established. Sen. Specter considered it "premature" to introduce legislation "based on a civil rights approach", referring to an Indianapolis ordinance and a proposed Minneapolis ordinance, but did introduce S. 3063 instead.
- Pornography Victims Protection Act of 1985, S. 1187 in the Senate, introduced by Sen. Arlen Specter with one cosponsor. In 1987, Sen. Specter said this bill was a "companion" to H.R. 5509 (appearing in this list). This bill, S. 1187, was cited in a court case, in a judge's dissenting opinion.
- Pornography Victims Protection Act of 1986, H.R. 5509 in the House of Representatives, introduced by Rep. Bill Green with 27 cosponsors. Sen. Specter, speaking in 1987, said H.R. 5509 "received strong bipartisan support."
- Pornography Victims Protection Act of 1987, H.R. 1213 in the House of Representatives and S. 703 in the Senate (whether the bills were identical is not stated), introduced respectively by Rep. Bill Green with 118 cosponsors and by Sen. Arlen Specter with 15 cosponsors. For S. 703, Sen. Specter made a public statement on the day he introduced the bill, explaining its premises and listing some of the support it has received. For both bills, subcommittees of the respective judiciary committees held hearings.
- Pornography Victims Protection Act of 1989, H.R. 3472 in the House of Representatives, introduced by Rep. Bill Green with 61 cosponsors.
- Pornography Victims Compensation Act of 1989, S. 1226 in the Senate, introduced by Sen. Mitch McConnell with 11 cosponsors.
- Pornography Victims Compensation Act of 1989, H.R. 3785 in the House of Representatives, introduced by Rep. Tom Tauke with 25 cosponsors.
- Pornography Victims Protection Act of 1991, H.R. 1768 in the House of Representatives, introduced by Rep. Bill Green with 68 cosponsors.
- Pornography Victims' Compensation Act of 1992, S. 1521 in the Senate, introduced by Sen. Mitch McConnell with 15 cosponsors.
- Pornography Victims Protection Act of 1993, H.R. 2174 in the House of Representatives, introduced by Rep. Jan Meyers with 33 cosponsors.

== Supporters and opponents ==
=== 1991 bill ===
Support came from Feminists Fighting Pornography and 200 National Organization for Women (NOW) chapters, but not two in New York and California and not from the national level of NOW. Support simultaneously came from Christian fundamentalists.

Opponents included Feminists for Free Expression, Nadine Strossen, Betty Friedan, Marcia Pally, Adrienne Rich, Katha Pollitt, Karen DeCrow, Nora Ephron, Mary Gordon, Judy Blume, Jamaica Kincaid, Erica Jong, Susan Isaacs, Mary Morello, and "172 other feminist women".

=== 1992 bill ===
Supporters, according to Sen. McConnell, included the Family Research Council, Feminists Fighting Pornography, the American Family Association, victims rights groups, and some chapters of the National Organization for Women. The opposition included an editorial in The New York Times.

== Criticism ==
Criticisms came from more than one direction: that the bill would punish a wide range of nonpornographic movies because criminals were inspired by them, that it would lead to bans of feminist positive literature about women, that booksellers would be timid about many titles that weren't obscene but just generally controversial, that scientists hadn't established a firm link between porn and misbehavior, that criminals should be held responsible for their actions rather than third parties being held liable, that similar legislation against bars because subsequent drunken driving led to accidents had not been tested against major beer producers, that using civil procedure rather than criminal to test if material is obscene when the standard of proof is lower in civil cases would make finding it obscene more likely, that juries seeing an attacked woman as a victim would be likelier to judge that material was obscene, that obscenity being defined by community standards and retailers' skittishness meant that the strictest community would be the standard-bearer for the nation, and that it didn't encompass all the pornography that feminists found violated women's civil rights.
