= Janet Broughton =

American philosopher

- Education: University of California, Davis (B.A.); Princeton University (Ph.D.)
- Scientific career
- Fields: Modern philosophy theories of mind
- Workplaces: University of California, Berkeley; Harvard University
- Doctoral advisor: Margaret Dauler Wilson

Janet Broughton is Emerita Professor of Philosophy and former Vice Provost for the Faculty at the University of California, Berkeley. Her academic research focuses on early modern philosophy, in particular that of David Hume and René Descartes.

== Education and career ==
Broughton attended Mount Holyoke College for a year but interrupted her formal education to join the VISTA program, where she worked on community programs for preschoolers and teenagers in Houston's Third Ward. Following that, she worked as a programmer and announcer for a classical music show on WRVR (now WLTW) in New York City. She returned to school and earned her B.A. in philosophy at the University of California, Davis. Broughton earned her Ph.D. in philosophy at Princeton University with a dissertation on Descartes' theory of causation.

Broughton's first academic position in philosophy was at Harvard University. She moved to the University of California, Berkeley in 1979 and served as department chair for 5 years. In 2006, she was appointed Dean of the Arts and Humanities division of Berkeley's College of Letters and Science in 2006. In 2010 she was appointed Vice Provost for the Faculty.

== Select publications ==
- Descartes's Method of Doubt
- A Companion to Descartes (co-edited with John Carriero)
- "The Inquiry in Hume's Treatise," The Philosophical Review 113 (4) (2004): 537-556.
- ""Hume's Naturalism About Cognitive Norms," Philosophical Topics 31 (1/2) (2003): 1-19
- "Explaining General Ideas," Hume Studies 26 (2)(2000): 279-289.
- "What does the Scientist of Man Observe?" Hume Studies 18 (2) (1992):155-168
- "Hume's Ideas about Necessary Connection," Hume Studies 13 (2)(1987):217-244.
- "Reinterpreting Descartes on the Notion of the Union of Mind and Body," Journal of the History of Philosophy 16 (1)(1978): 23-32 (with Ruth Mattern).
