= Christia Mercer =

American philosopher

- Born: Fort Worth, Texas, US
- Education: Brooklyn College (B.A.); Princeton University (Ph.D.)
- Scientific career
- Fields: Early modern philosophy, Feminist Philosophy
- Workplaces: Columbia University
- Doctoral advisor: Margaret Dauler Wilson

Christia Mercer is an American philosopher and the Gustave M. Berne Professor in the Department of Philosophy at Columbia University. She is known for her work on the history of early modern philosophy, the history of Platonism, and the history of gender. She has received national attention for her work teaching in prisons and advocating for educational opportunities for incarcerated people. She is the Director and Founder of the Center for New Narratives in Philosophy at Columbia University, which "supports innovative research in the history of philosophy and promotes diversity in the teaching and practice of philosophy." She is the editor of Oxford Philosophical Concepts, co-editor (with Melvin Rogers) of Oxford New Histories of Philosophy, and was elected to serve as president of the American Philosophical Association, Eastern Division, 2019–20.

== Life and career ==
Born and raised in Fort Worth, Texas, Mercer studied art history before living in Rome where she studied Latin with Reginald Foster at the Gregorian University. She received a PhD in philosophy from Princeton University in 1989 under the supervision of Margaret Dauler Wilson and a Fulbright Scholarship to study in the Leibniz Archives in the University of Münster in 1984. She joined the Columbia philosophy department in 1991.

Mercer has been the Guest Professor, Seminar für Geistesgeschichte und Philosophie der Renaissance, LMU Munich, 2003; gave the Ernst Cassirer Lectures at the University of Hamburg, 2006; and was visiting professor at the University of Oslo (2012–15).

She has held fellowships from the Humboldt Foundation (1993–94), NEH (2002), Herzog August Bibliotek, the National Humanities Center (2012), the American Academy in Rome (2013), the ACLS (2015–16), Harvard's Villa I Tatti Library (2015), and the Folger Library (2016). In 2012, Mercer was awarded a Guggenheim Fellowship and in 2018-19 was chosen as the Mildred Londa Weisman Fellow at the Radcliffe Institute for Advanced Study. She was a visitor at Villa I Tatti again in 2021 and 24, held a residency at Bogliasco in 2024, and was Visiting Fellow at Trinity College, Cambridge 2023–24. From 2004 to 2015, Mercer was the North American Editor for Archiv für Geschichte der Philosophie.

Mercer's teaching awards include the 2008 Columbia College Great Teacher Award and the 2012 Mark van Doren Award, which annually recognizes a professor for "commitment to undergraduate instruction, as well as for humanity, devotion to truth and inspiring leadership." Her recent awards include the Stefanopoulos Philosophical Society Award, presented annually to “the world’s leading philosopher who is promoting the study of research in philosophy in areas with real-world applications, and work that is intended to make a constructive contribution to problems in these areas.”

At Columbia, Mercer has been active in interdisciplinary pursuits. From 2010 to 2012 and 2013–2014, she was the chair for the Core Curriculum course, Literature Humanities, an interdisciplinary course on the masterpieces of Western literature and philosophy taken by all first-year undergraduates at Columbia College. She was the Director for the Institute for Research on Women and Gender at Columbia from 2000 to 2001.

She was elected to serve as president of the Eastern Division of the American Philosophical Association for 2019–20. Her presidential lecture, “Empowering Philosophy,” was published in 2020.

== Philosophical work ==
Mercer began her career working primarily in early modern philosophy. Her book, Leibniz's Metaphysics: Its Origins and Development (CUP, 2001), offers a new interpretation of Leibniz's philosophical development. She has published widely on Leibniz and on the diversity and importance of early modern Platonisms.

Mercer has begun to devote herself more and more to contextualizing the history of philosophy. She has designed a book series, Oxford Philosophical Concepts, that enlists prominent international scholars to think creatively about the "lives" of concepts in the history of philosophy. There are more than 20 volumes published. These include Animals, Dignity, Efficient Causation, Embodiment, Eternity, Evil, The Faculties, Memory, Moral Motivation, Persons, Pleasure, Self-Knowledge, and Sympathy. Each of the volumes traces the historical development of central philosophical concepts and includes interdisciplinary "reflections." She is also the editor of the Oxford New Histories of Philosophy series, which she launched with the late Eileen O'Neill and now co-edits with Melvin Rogers, and which "speaks to a growing concern to broaden and reexamine philosophy's past". Mercer has written about the importance of inclusive history of philosophy in op-eds for the New York Times and the Washington Post.

Motivated by her friend, Eileen O'Neill, she has become increasingly devoted to discovering and articulating the ideas of early modern and late medieval women. Her paper, "Descartes' Debt to Teresa of Ávila, Or Why We Should Work on Women in the History of Philosophy," in Phil Studies, August, 2016, exposes that the famous evil deceiver argument in the Meditations on First Philosophy is indebted to Teresa of Ávila and asks how this crucial fact has been overlooked for centuries. Alongside her book on the philosophy of the English philosopher Anne Conway she is publishing a new edition and translation of Conway's Principles with Andrew Arlig and Jasper Reid.

== Political and activist work ==
In 2015, Mercer became the first Columbia University professor to teach in a prison as part of Columbia's Justice In-Education Initiative. At Taconic Correctional Facility, she taught female prisoners texts including the Aeschylus's Oresteia, Euripides's Medea, Aristophanes's Lysistrata, and William Shakespeare's Twelfth Night. She has been active in the education and prison reform movements, publishing op-eds and posts in the Washington Post and other outlets about philosophy's gender bias, the history of Christianity, and the prison-industrial complex. In 2015, her post on the Columbia prison divestment campaign was publicly challenged by Jonathan Burns, director of public affairs for the Corrections Corporation of America, who accused her of making "multiple misleading and false statements about our company." Mercer's response argued that "Mr. Burns's demand for corrections exemplifies the tortured logic of the corporation he represents."

Mercer is the founder of Just Ideas, which "brings together Columbia interns and some of the most talented professors in New York City to engage on equal terms with people in New York prisons." Her experience with teaching incarcerated students was featured in a nationally broadcast segment on CBS This Morning and described in her op-ed for the Washington Post and in a piece about her experience for Columbia News. In 2018, she published an op-ed arguing for the importance of making access to books available to incarcerated people. She was interviewed on this topic by WBUR's On Point. In 2019, she published an article on "the philosophical origins of patriarchy" in The Nation. Her Just Ideas program has been awarded funding by the Marc Sanders Foundation Awards for Excellence in Philosophy.

== Recent awards and positions ==
- President of the American Philosophical Association, Eastern Division, 2019–20.
- Radcliffe Institute Fellowship, 2018–19.
- Fellowship, Folger Shakespeare Library, Spring, 2016.
- Senior Professor, Villa I Tatti, Florence, Italy, Fall, 2015.
- Resident Fellow, American Academy, Rome, Italy, Spring, 2013.
- Sovereign/Columbia Affiliated Fellowship, American Academy, Rome, Italy, 2010–11.
- Gustave M. Berne Professor of Philosophy, 2009–present.
- Great Teacher Award, Society of Columbia Graduates, Columbia College, 2008.
- Gustave M. Berne Professorship in the Core Curriculum at Columbia College, 2003–2009.
- North American Editor, Archiv für Geschichte der Philosophie, 2002–2015.
- Guest Professor, Centre Alexandre Koyré, École des Hautes Études en Sciences Sociales, December 2003, November 5, December 7.
- Ernst Cassirer Lectures, Ernst Cassirer Guest Professorship, Philosophy Faculty, University of Hamburg, Spring 2006.

== Books ==
- Oxford New Histories of Philosophy, Series Editor (co-edited with Melvin Rogers)
- Oxford Philosophical Concepts, Series Editor
- Early Modern Philosophy: Mind, Matter, and Mechanism (co-edited with Eileen O'Neill), Oxford University Press, 2005.
- Leibniz's Metaphysics: Its Origins and Development, Cambridge University Press, 2001; paperback edition, 2006.
