= Women Against Violence Against Women =

American feminist organization

- Abbreviation: WAVAW
- Formation: 1977; 49 years ago
- Purpose: Anti-pornography; women's rights; feminism; civil rights
- Members: 10 staff members, 3 relief workers, 26 volunteers, 8 volunteer board members (2008)

Women Against Violence Against Women (WAVAW) is an American feminist, anti-pornography, activist organization, founded in 1977.

== Background ==
In the 1970s and 1980s, there was a significant, feminist reaction in the United States to the increased popularity and cultural presence of pornography. In New York, the public debut of the film Snuff caused significant controversy in the media and a strong reaction by feminists, such as Andrea Dworkin, who picketed the movie house. From that action, the organization Women Against Pornography was created, whose founding members included prominent feminists, such as poet Adrienne Rich, author Grace Paley, sex educator Shere Hite, Andrea Dworkin, Gloria Steinem, and others. In San Francisco, the Women Against Violence in Pornography and Media organization was formed, in the 1970s, to protest against porn's "cultural dominance," initiating direct actions such as public slide shows, hostile tours of porn shops, and demonstrations in red-light districts.

== History ==
In 1977, a large group of women, led by radical feminist Marcia Womongold and self-styled as "Women Against Violence Against Women," denounced and protested in public against the Atlantic Records' ad campaign for the Rolling Stones album Black and Blue, in Los Angeles, which depicted on a billboard a bound and bruised woman with the caption "I'm Black and Blue from the Rolling Stones — and I love it!". The billboard was eventually removed after the group's protests, though the subsequent demands for other record companies to follow suit and "clean up" their LPs' covers were not successful. The group coagulated into the eponymous organization that went on to start a number of chapters in several cities throughout North America and the United Kingdom, with a particularly active chapter in Boston.

In 1980, some five days after a Yorkshire Ripper murder, the Leeds, UK, chapter of Women Against Violence Against Women organized, along with Reclaim the Night, a two-day event, called the Women’s Liberation National Conference, its theme being "Sexual Violence Against Women."

The Women Against Violence Against Women rape crisis center is still the largest one operating in British Columbia, Canada.

== See also ==
- Opposition to pornography
- BDSM
