= Toward a Feminist Theory of the State =

1989 book by Catharine MacKinnon

- Cover of the first edition
- Author: Catharine MacKinnon
- Language: English
- Subject: Feminist political theory
- Publisher: Harvard University Press
- Publication date: 1989
- Publication place: United States
- Media type: Print (hardcover and paperback)
- Pages: 330
- ISBN: 978-0-674-89645-1
- OCLC: 19589567

Toward a Feminist Theory of the State is a 1989 book about feminist political theory by the legal scholar Catharine MacKinnon.

== Summary ==
MacKinnon argues that feminism had "no account of male power as an ordered yet deranged whole"; that is, a systematic account of the structural organization whereby male dominance is instantiated and enforced. Although earlier writers, including Mary Wollstonecraft, Charlotte Perkins Gilman, and Simone de Beauvoir, had offered "a rich description of the variables and locales of sexism," they had not produced a general theory of structural exploitation based on sex-based hierarchy.

MacKinnon proposes Toward a Feminist Theory of the State as an answer to this perceived problem. MacKinnon takes Marxism as the theory's point of departure, arguing that unlike liberal theories, Marxism "confronts organized social dominance, analyzes it in dynamic rather than static terms, identifies social forces that systematically shape social imperatives, and seeks to explain social freedom both within and against history." She elaborates:

Marxism and feminism provide accounts of the way social arrangements of patterned and cumulative disparity can be internally rational and systematic yet unjust. Both are theories of power, its social derivations and its maldistribution. Both are theories of social inequality. In unequal societies, gender and with it sexual desire and kinship structures, like value and with it acquisitiveness and the forms of property ownership, are considered presocial, part of the natural world, primordial or magical or aboriginal. As Marxism exposes value as social creation, feminism exposes desire as socially relational, internally necessary to unequal social orders but historically contingent.

MacKinnon rejects social reform that proceeds through pluralistic models of liberalism: "To proliferate 'feminisms' in the face of women's diversity is the latest attempt of liberal pluralism to evade the challenge women's reality poses to theory, simply because the theoretical forms those realities demand have yet to be created." According to MacKinnon, "Abortion opponents and proponents share a tacit assumption that women significantly control sex", that sexual intercourse is "coequally determined", without taking into account the overall context of non-consent, subordination, and violence within which intercourse commonly occurs. Rape, according to MacKinnon, "is adjudicated not according to the power or the force that a man yields, but according to indices of intimacy between the parties."

== Reception ==
=== Academic reviews ===
Emily Calhoun writes that many readers, including herself, "simply do not see domination rooted in sexuality as the central problem for women, especially to the exclusion or minimization of problems of equality, problems of the freedom to engage with others, [and] problems of individual growth. ... By rejecting persuasive methodologies simply because they have been used to secure the assent of women to the male experience and viewpoint, MacKinnon ultimately dooms her enterprise." Jill Vickers accuses MacKinnon of failing to subject her theory to her own critique; that is, of not taking into account the plurality of contexts within which sexism occurs, thereby "globalizing and naturalizing the worst features of her own society."

Likewise, Zillah Eisenstein, editor of Capitalist Patriarchy and the Case for Socialist Feminism (1978), writes that MacKinnon's "analysis of male power and the state appears overly determined and homogenous", ignoring that "liberal feminism has uncovered its own limitations via its own critiques of women of color, radical feminism, and so on." Michael Meyer suggests that MacKinnon's critique of liberalism "indulges in overgeneralizations and clearly fails to address the diversity and complexity of liberal perspectives. She fails to engage with Ronald Dworkin's extensive, and well-known, discussion of this very issue."

Prominent queer theorist Judith Butler penned a harsh critique of MacKinnon's work, writing, "MacKinnon insists that feminism does not require prioritizing of oppressions, and that 'male domination' or 'patriarchy' must be construed as the systemic and founding source of oppression for women. And though this may appear true for some economically advantaged white women, to universalize this presumption is to effect a set of erasures, to cover over or 'subordinate' women who 'are' sites of competing oppressions, and to legislate through a kind of theoretical imperialism feminist priorities that have produced resistances and factionalizations of various kinds." Hence, Butler logically concludes that MacKinnon is a "theological, imperializing Subject." Similarly, Linda Nicholson rejects the homogenizing simplification of "women as a single entity", effectively erasing women who are not "white, Western, and middle-class." Carrie Menkel-Meadow accuses MacKinnon of holding "tenaciously to an essentialist position", and of undertaking a "remarkably heterosexist analysis." Kathryn Abrams echoes this critique, arguing that MacKinnon assimilates Native American women into a "cross-cultural constant" that is "solipsistic and even manipulative." In addition, Abrams calls MacKinnon's dominance theory "relentlessly removed from practical concerns." Neil MacCormick detects "cultural imperialism" in MacKinnon's account of the law, wherein a "flat universality" of the United States occludes all other perspectives.

Drucilla Cornell argues that MacKinnon's "reduction of feminine sexual difference to victimization ultimately cannot sustain a feminist theory of the state." According to Cornell, MacKinnon reduces "feminine sexuality to being a 'fuckee'", thereby reproducing the very "sexual shame" she had to intended to eliminate. Ruth Colker raises a similar concern, interpreting MacKinnon as "equating society with male domination."

Laura Robinson praises the book's "intriguing theoretical insights", while expressing concern that MacKinnon "simplifies all sex acts as rape". Judith Baer writes that Toward a Feminist Theory of the State "establishes MacKinnon as the preeminent figure within the scholarly subfield of feminist jurisprudence", although she takes issue with MacKinnon's assertion that the First Amendment protects pornography that "teaches men to degrade and dehumanize women ... Of course, it does not; constitutional doctrine puts obscene material outside the scope of freedom of expression and explicitly includes the preservation of individual morality among the state's legitimate concerns."

In Sex and Social Justice, philosopher Martha Nussbaum accepts MacKinnon's critique of abstract liberalism, assimilating the salience of history and context of group hierarchy and subordination, but concludes that this appeal is rooted in liberalism rather than a critique of it. "Liberal philosophers," Nussbaum argues, "have rejected the purely formal notion of equality. Liberals standardly grant that the equality of opportunity that individuals have a right to demand from their government has material prerequisites, and that these prerequisites may vary depending on one's situation in society." Nussbaum points out that John Rawls, among the most prominent liberal philosophers of the 20th-century, provides "ample resources" to consider contextual hierarchy.

=== Popular press ===
Reviews in the popular press were similarly mixed. Writing for The Nation, political scientist Wendy Brown lamented MacKinnon's "profoundly static world view and undemocratic, perhaps even anti-democratic, political sensibility." Brown called the work "flatly dated," developed at "the dawn of feminism's second wave ... framed by a political-intellectual context that no longer exists -- a male Marxist monopoly on radical social discourse."

Gloria Steinem, however, declared, "By exposing and correcting the patriarchal values underlying nationalism and justice, Catharine MacKinnon causes an earthquake in our thinking that rearranges every part of our intellectual landscape."
