= Lisa Duggan =

Professor of social and cultural analysis

- Title: Professor of Social and Cultural Analysis

Academic work
- Institutions: New York University

Lisa Duggan (/ˈduːɡən/) is an American social and queer theorist who serves as Professor of Social and Cultural Analysis at New York University.

Duggan has been influential in the fields of queer and gender studies, and is best known for popularizing the concept of homonormativity in her 2003 book The Twilight of Equality?. She has written on topics including feminist views on pornography, neoliberalism, queer history, political theory and US culture. Duggan was president of the American Studies Association from 2014 to 2015. In 2026, Duggan was honored with the CLAGS Kessler Award.

== Education and academic career ==
Duggan completed her B.A. at the University of Virginia in 1976 and earned an M.A. in Women’s History from Sarah Lawrence College in 1979. She received her Ph.D. in Modern American History from the University of Pennsylvania in 1992. Her research focused on the history of sexuality and social history.

Early in her career, Duggan taught at Brown University before joining the faculty at New York University (NYU). At NYU, she is a Professor in the Department of Social and Cultural Analysis and has held multiple leadership roles, including Director of the Program in Gender and Sexuality Studies (2016–2018) and Director of the Program in American Studies (2006–2008). In 2014, she served as the President of the American Studies Association., where she presided over its annual conference on the theme of "The Fun and the Fury: New Dialectics of Pleasure and Pain in the Post-American Century".

Duggan is also one of the editors of queer commentary website Bully Bloggers, developed with José Esteban Muñoz, Jack Halberstam, and Tavia Nyong’o.

== Activism ==
Duggan started her activism in the early 1980s. She worked with the Washington Office on Africa to support the anti-apartheid movement and promote divestment from South Africa. In 1984, she co-founded the Feminist Anti-Censorship Task Force, or FACT, where she and other members addressed issues related to antipornography civil rights ordinances. They believed that these laws could end up censoring important feminist and lesbian materials.

In the 2000s, Duggan became involved with Queers for Economic Justice, a New York organization that focused on links between queer issues and poverty. In 2006, she co-wrote the "Beyond Marriage" statement, which promoted the acceptance of various forms of relationships and criticized the mainstream LGBT movement’s focus on marriage equality. She has described herself as a "commie pinko queer feminist."

In 2013, she was elected as the president of the American Studies Association (ASA), where she supported a resolution to boycott Israeli academic institutions. This led to a lawsuit against her (Bronner v. Duggan), from four ASA members who questioned the boycott's legality. The D.C. Superior Court dismissed the lawsuit in 2023. She remains a member of the Faculty for Justice in Palestine at NYU.

== Bibliography ==
- Sex Wars: Sexual Dissent and Political Culture, with Nan D. Hunter (Routledge, 1995)
- Sapphic Slashers: Sex, Violence and American Modernity (Duke University Press, 2000)
- Our Monica, Ourselves: The Clinton Affair and National Interest, ed. with Lauren Berlant (New York University Press, 2001)
- The Twilight of Equality?: Neoliberalism, Cultural Politics, and the Attack on Democracy (Beacon Press, 2003)
- Mean Girl: Ayn Rand and the Culture of Greed (University of California Press, 2019)
