= Sylvia A. Law =

American lawyer and educator (born 1942)

- Born: 1942 (age 83–84); Minnesota, USA
- Education: Antioch College (BA); New York University (JD)
- Children: 1

Sylvia A. Law (born 1942) is the Elizabeth K. Dollard Professor of Law, Medicine and Psychiatry Emerita and a former co-director of the Arthur Garfield Hays Civil Liberties Program at New York University School of Law.

== Biography ==
Law was born in Minnesota in 1942 and attended public schools in Minnesota, South Dakota, and Montana. She earned her B.A. (1964) from Antioch College and her J.D. (1968) from New York University School of Law.

In 1984, Law became the first lawyer in the United States selected as a MacArthur Prize Fellow. She has been active in the Society of American Law Teachers, serving as president of the organization from 1988 to 1990. In 2004, Law was elected to the American Academy of Arts and Sciences. In 2013, the Sylvia A. Law Fellowship in Economic Justice was created as part of the Hays Civil Liberties Program at NYU Law School.

She lives in New York City, Woodstock, New York and Kailua, Hawaii. Her son, Benjamin Ensminger-Law, was born in 1977 and is a banker in New York City.

== Representative Publications ==
- Blue Cross: What Went Wrong? (2nd ed. 1976)
- Pain and Profit: The Politics of Malpractice (1978)
- "Women, Work, Welfare and the Preservation of Patriarchy," 131 University of Pennsylvania Law Review 1249 (1983)
- "Rethinking Sex and the Constitution," 132 University of Pennsylvania Law Review 955 (1984)
- "Crystal Eastman: NYU Law Graduate," 66 New York University Law Review 1963 (1991)
- "Physician Assisted Death: An Essay on Rights and Remedies," 55 Maryland Law Review 292 (1996)
- Law and the American Health Care System (1997)
- "Ending Welfare as We Know It," 49 Stanford Law Review 471 (1997)
- "Homosexuality and the Social Meaning of Gender," 1988 Wisconsin Law Review 187 (1998)
- "Sex Discrimination and Insurance for Contraception," 73 Washington Law Review 363 (1998)
- "White Privilege and Affirmative Action," 32 Akron Law Review 603 (1999)
- "Commercial Sex: Beyond Decriminalization," 73 California Law Review 526 (2000)
