= Women Against Pornography =

Radical feminist group

Women Against Pornography (WAP) was a radical feminist activist group based out of New York City that was influential in the anti-pornography movement of the late 1970s and the 1980s.

WAP was the most well known feminist anti-pornography group out of many that were active throughout the United States and the anglophone world, primarily from the late 1970s through the early 1990s. After previous failed attempts to start a broad feminist anti-pornography group in New York City, WAP was finally established in 1978. WAP quickly drew widespread support for its anti-pornography campaign, and in late 1979 held a March on Times Square that included over 5000 supporters. Through their march as well as other means of activism, WAP was able to bring in unexpected financial support from the Mayor's office, theater owners, and other parties with an interest in the gentrification of Times Square.

WAP became known because of their anti-pornography informational tours of sex shops and pornographic theaters held in Times Square. In the 1980s, WAP began to focus more on lobbying and legislative efforts against pornography, particularly in support of civil-rights-oriented antipornography legislation. They were also active in testifying before the Meese Commission and some of their advocacy of a civil-rights based anti-pornography model found its way into the final recommendations of the commission. In the late 1980s, the leadership of WAP changed their focus again, this time more on the issue of international sex trafficking, which led to the founding of the Coalition Against Trafficking in Women. In the 1990s WAP became less active and eventually faded out of existence in the mid '90s.

The positions of Women Against Pornography were controversial. Civil liberties advocates opposed WAP and similar groups, holding that the legislative approaches WAP advocated amounted to censorship. In addition to this, WAP faced conflict with sex-positive feminists, who held that feminist campaigns against pornography were misdirected and ultimately threatened sexual freedoms and free speech rights in a way that would be detrimental toward women and sexual minorities. WAP and sex-positive feminists were involved in conflict in the events surrounding the 1982 Barnard Conference. These events were battles in what became known as the Feminist Sex Wars of the late 1970s and 1980s.

== Formation ==
The group that eventually became Women Against Pornography emerged from the efforts of New York radical activists in fall 1976, after the public controversy and pickets organized by Andrea Dworkin and other radical feminists over the public debut of Snuff. It was part of a larger wave of radical feminist organizing around the issue of pornography, which included protests by the Los Angeles group Women Against Violence Against Women against The Rolling Stones' sadomasochistic advertisements for their album Black and Blue (see below). Founding members of the New York group included Adrienne Rich, Grace Paley, Gloria Steinem, Shere Hite, Lois Gould, Barbara Deming, Karla Jay, Andrea Dworkin, Letty Cottin Pogrebin, and Robin Morgan. These initial efforts stalled after a year of meeting and resolutions over a position paper, which they hoped to place as a paid advertisement in The New York Times, expressing feminist objections to pornography, and distinguishing them from conservative complaints against "obscenity".

In November 1978, a group of New York feminists participated in a national feminist antipornography conference, organized by Women Against Violence in Pornography and Media (WAVPM) in San Francisco. After the conference, Susan Brownmiller approached WAVPM organizers Laura Lederer and Lynn Campbell, and encouraged them to come to New York City to help with anti-pornography organizing there. Lederer decided to stay in San Francisco to edit an anthology based on the conference presentations, but Campbell took up the offer. She arrived in New York in April 1979, with Brownmiller, Adrienne Rich, and Frances Whyatt contributing money to help her cover her living expenses while the organizing work progressed. Dolores Alexander was soon recruited as a fundraiser, and Barbara Mehrhof was hired as an organizer soon thereafter with the money that Alexander was able to raise. Brownmiller soon took an unpaid position as the fourth organizer.

== Membership and support ==
The original organizers of Women Against Pornography came primarily from the New York radical feminist groups that had developed during the 1970s, but once their organization began they found unexpected sources of membership and support from across New York. According to Susan Brownmiller,

The group that became Women Against Pornography was livelier and more diverse than any I'd ever worked with in the movement. Maggie Smith's bar, with "I Will Survive" blaring on the jukebox, was a pit stop for the neighborhood prostitutes she was trying to keep off junk. Amina Abdur Rahman, education director for the New York Urban League, had been with Malcolm X in the Audubon Ballroom on the night he was murdered. Dianne Levitt was the student organizer of an anti-Playboy protest at Barnard, Dorchen Leidholdt had founded New York WAVAW, Frances Patai was a former actress and model, Marilyn Kaskel was a TV production assistant, Angela Bonavoglia did freelance magazine writing, Jessica James was starring off Broadway, Janet Lawson was a jazz singer, Alexandra Matusinka's family ran a nearby plumbing supply store, Sheila Roher was a playwright, Ann Jones was writing Women Who Kill, Anne Bowen had played guitar with The Deadly Nightshade, and Myra Terry was an interior decorator and a NOW chapter president in New Jersey.

The diversity in perspectives within the group was the source of considerable debate and some acrimony. WAP originally did not take a stance on the issue of prostitution, for example, since there was a division between members who opposed prostitution as a form of male domination and those who wanted to bring prostitutes into the movement. (WAP later came to strongly oppose prostitution as a form of exploitation of women, and critiqued pornography as a "system of prostitution".) There was also considerable tension between heterosexual feminists and lesbian separatists.

WAP's decision to focus attention on pornography and prostitution in Times Square drew unexpected support from Broadway theater owners and city development agencies despairing at the increasing crime and urban blight in the neighborhood of Times Square. Carl Weisbrod, the head of the Mayor's Midtown Enforcement Project, helped them secure rent-free office space from the 42nd Street Redevelopment Corporation, in an empty bar and restaurant storefront that they were able to use until a buyer could be found (they occupied the storefront for more than two years, until two adjacent buildings collapsed during a renovation). St. Malachy's, a Midtown actors' chapel, contributed surplus desks. When Bob Guccione tried to buy the storefront space (in order to open an establishment to be named the Meat Rack), WAP alerted neighborhood residents, who protested and defeated the proposed deal.

However, the wider involvement sometimes created conflicts with supporters who did not realize that the group's goals extended beyond Times Square:

The League of New York Theater Owners wrote us a check for ten thousand dollars, although Gerry Schoenfeld of the Shubert Organization, the czar behind the generous gift, threw a fit when he saw that our mission was somewhat broader than "clean up Times Square." "Playboy?" he yelled one day, barging into the office. "You're against Playboy? Where's Gloria Steinem? Does she know what you're doing?

== March on Times Square ==
Women Against Pornography also organized a March on Times Square, held October 20, 1979. The march drew between five and seven thousand demonstrators, who marched behind a huge stitched banner reading "Women Against Pornography / Stop Violence Against Women," including Brownmiller, Alexander, Campbell, Mehrhof, Bella Abzug, Gloria Steinem, Robin Morgan, Andrea Dworkin, Charlotte Bunch, Judy Sullivan, and Amina Abdur-Rahman. The march drew extensive coverage of the CBS evening news and in the morning papers.

== Later history ==
After the March on Times Square, Lynn Campbell resigned her position as an organizer (due to her failing health) and Brownmiller resigned to finish work on her book Femininity, while Dorchen Leidholdt took on a new leadership role in the organization.

In 1988, WAP organized a conference titled "Trafficking in Women", co-sponsored with Evelina Giobbe's feminist anti-prostitution group Women Hurt in Systems of Prostitution Engaged in Revolt (WHISPER). The conference explored the alleged role of sex trafficking in bringing women into the sex industry. As a result of this conference, Leidholdt felt it would be more productive to focus on combatting the international sex industry, and founded the Coalition Against Trafficking in Women (CATW) for that purpose. She also soon stepped down as leader of Women Against Pornography in order to focus her efforts on this new campaign.

After the departure of Leidholdt, WAP became much less active. The group was led by Norma Ramos, who continued to make appearances in the name of WAP through the early 1990s. WAP faded out of existence during the mid-1990s, closing in 1996–'97, though Leidholt and Ramos both continued to be active in CATW into the 2000s.

== Campaigns ==
Throughout the late 1970s and early 1980s, Women Against Pornography focused on educational campaigns to raise awareness of what they viewed as the harms caused by pornography and the sex industry. Their activism took on many forms, including expose slide-shows, tours of sex industry outlets in Times Square, conferences, and public demonstrations.

=== Slide shows ===
The group's earliest educational efforts were a series of slide shows of hardcore and softcore pornography, which were shown with critical commentary by a WAP presenter. The format of a slide show with critical commentary had been used earlier by Julia London of the Los Angeles group Women Against Violence Against Women to illustrate soft-core pornographic themes in rock album covers; WAP adapted the format to discuss pornography in general, including hardcore pornography. Slide shows were generally organized by local feminist groups, and held in women's homes as part of consciousness-raising meetings. The anti-pornography movement has continued to use slide shows as an educational tactic for feminist group meetings and public events.

Opponents of anti-pornography feminism have criticized the slide shows of WAP and similar groups, claiming that they disproportionately emphasized violent and sadomasochistic materials and presented these themes as being typical of all pornography.

=== Times Square tours ===
Women Against Pornography's best-known tactic was a guided tour of the pornography and prostitution outlets in Times Square, which they led twice a week for a suggested contribution of $5.00. (In San Francisco, WAVPM had conducted similar tours in the red-light districts of that city.) Lynn Campbell suggested that people who did not consume pornography knew very little about the content of the pornography or the atmosphere in sex shops and live sex shows, and that actual guided tours of the sex industry in Times Square would provide an excellent educational tool. Susan Brownmiller planned an itinerary for the tour and wrote a script for the guides (with the help of information supplied by Carl Weisbrod, a police officer tasked with finding and closing down underground brothels in Midtown, and Maggie Smith, the owner of a neighborhood bar). The tours often involved unplanned encounters—being physically thrown out by enraged store managers, watching businessmen try to hide from the tourists, or talking briefly with nude performers while they took their breaks. After a reporter for The New York Times took one of the first tours and wrote a feature article for the Style section, WAP received coverage in People, Time, The Philadelphia Inquirer, European newspapers, local TV news programs and talk shows in New York City, and The Phil Donahue Show in Chicago.

=== Demonstrations ===
Women Against Pornography also organized a number of large demonstrations against pornography, most notably the March on Times Square (see above).

=== Later campaigns ===
During the era of Dorchen Leidholdt's leadership, the group continued the Times Square tours and slide shows, organized smaller-scale protest demonstrations, sent out speakers and held public panel discussions on pornography, and announced "WAP zaps," a series of publicly announced awards and condemnations focused on the advertising industry, and expressed public support for Linda Boreman after she publicly stated that Chuck Traynor had violently coerced her into making Deep Throat and other pornographic films as "Linda Lovelace". WAP also became more active in political lobbying during this time.

WAP was among several groups that protested the release of pornographic video games by Mystique during the 1980s, especially against their game Custer's Revenge, which was seen by many as racist.

=== Lobbying ===
WAP also focused on lobbying for anti-pornography legislation, particularly legislation such as the Dworkin-MacKinnon Antipornography Civil Rights Ordinance that adhered to the feminist "civil rights" approach rather than the older "obscenity" approach. In accordance with this, in 1984 WAP lobbied to change a proposed Suffolk County, New York anti-pornography ordinance to reflect their approach; when these changes were not forthcoming, WAP, along with several anti-censorship groups, successfully lobbied against passage of the measure.

In 1986, the group played an important role in the Meese Commission hearings, helping the commission locate witnesses and having Dorchen Leidholdt testify during the commission hearings. In spite of this, WAP sought to distance itself from the commission, which took a conservative anti-obscenity approach to pornography, even holding a demonstration against the commission immediately before Leidholdt's appearance as a friendly witness. Much of their language of pornography as a civil rights violation against women found its way into the final report of the Meese Commission.

=== Advertising awards ===
WAP held an annual awards ceremony in which plastic pigs were handed out for advertising campaigns that WAP considered "demeaning to women and girls" and "Ms. Liberty awards" were awarded for "prowoman ads". Many advertisers disagreed with WAP's interpretation of their ad campaigns, though at least one recipient of a "pig" award, the shoemaker Famolare, responded by changing its ads, and was rewarded with a "Ms. Liberty" award the next year.

=== Conferences ===
In 1987, WAP organized a conference titled "The Sexual Liberals and the Attack on Feminism", a forum in which various notable radical feminist writers stated their opposition to the newly emerging school of sex-positive feminism. In 1988, WAP (along with WHISPER), organized a conference titled "Trafficking in Women" (see above), addressing the question of the role of trafficking in the international sex industry.

=== Case support ===
According to Dworkin, in ca. 1988, WAP established a criminal defense fund for Jayne Stamen, who was convicted of manslaughter for arranging a beating of her husband (who died) which followed experience with her husband using pornography and of criminal solicitation for trying to have him murdered after he threatened violence, but the fund was unable to raise bail money for her appeal.

== Opposition and controversies ==
The late former magazine editor and porn actress Gloria Leonard was an outspoken advocate for the adult industry and for several years in the 1980s debated representatives from WAP at numerous college campuses.

=== Civil liberties and sexual liberalism ===
Many of Women Against Pornography's campaigns for legal remedies against pornography brought them into direct confrontation with civil liberties advocates such as the ACLU, who argued that laws such as the Dworkin/Mackinnon Ordinance were simply another form of censorship. WAP was particularly criticized for what was seen by many as its friendly stance toward the Meese Commission, which was viewed by many as a government attack on civil liberties. For its part, WAP argued that an absolutist free speech doctrine ended up compromising the civil rights of women. WAP also charged that monetary contributions from pornographers to groups like the ACLU had compromised the ability of such groups to view legal tactics against pornography objectively.

From its beginnings, the group was controversial in feminist circles, many of whom felt that feminist campaigns against pornography were misdirected and ultimately threatened sexual freedoms and free speech rights in a way that would be ultimately detrimental toward women, gay people, and sexual minorities. Ellen Willis was particularly outspoken in her criticism of WAP and other feminist anti-pornography campaigns. Opposition to the kind of feminist anti-pornography politics espoused by WAP led to the rise of an opposing movement within feminism known as "pro-sex feminism" (a term coined by Willis). For its part, WAP viewed sex positive feminists as "sexual liberals" and "sexual liberationists" who were not real feminists and were blind to (or possibly even in collusion with) male sexual oppression of women and the central role of such oppression in the upholding male dominance.

These controversies came to a head in an event known as the Barnard Conference on Sexuality, a 1982 academic conference on feminist perspectives on sexuality. The conference was organized by "pro-sex" and other feminists who felt that their perspectives were excluded by the dominance of the anti-pornography radical feminist position in feminist circles. The latter were in turn excluded from participation in the Barnard Conference. WAP responded by picketing the conference. It is also alleged that WAP engaged in a campaign of harassment against several of the conference organizers (among them author Dorothy Allison), publishing their home addresses and phone numbers on leaflets that were distributed publicly, engaging in telephone harassment, and calling the employers of these individuals in an attempt to get them fired from their jobs. In 1984, feminists opposed to Women Against Pornography and feminist anti-pornography politics coalesced in the group, Feminist Anti-Censorship Taskforce (FACT).

The often-acerbic confrontations between sex-positive and anti-porn feminists (in which WAP played a central role) during the 1980s became known as the Feminist Sex Wars.

=== Coalescing with nonfeminists ===
A criticism is that by coalescing with nonfeminists, specifically the Christian right against pornography feminists are co-opted and the movement becomes itself nonfeminist. According to Alice Echols in 1983, "[t]he cultural feminists of WAP appeal to women's sense of sexual vulnerability and the resilience of gender stereotypes in their struggle to organize all women into a grand and virtuous sisterhood to combat male lasciviousness. Thus, when Judith Bat-Ada argues that to fight pornography 'a coalition of all women needs to be established, regardless of ... political persuasion,' she abandons feminism for female moral outrage."

== Similar groups ==
A number of feminist anti-pornography groups sprang up throughout the United States, as well as internationally, particularly during the late 1970s and early 1980s. Some histories of the anti-pornography movement mistakenly refer to the activities of these groups as those of "Women Against Pornography", which was by far the best-known of these groups.

Among the first such groups was Women Against Violence Against Women (WAVAW), which was founded in Los Angeles in 1976 and was led by Marcia Womongold. This group was best known for holding a demonstration in 1977 in response to a BDSM-themed billboard for the Rolling Stones album Black and Blue, which showed a bound and bruised woman with the caption "I'm 'Black and Blue' from the Rolling Stones — and I love it!". The billboard was removed in response to the WAVAW's protests. WAVAW went on to start a number of chapters in several cities throughout North America and the United Kingdom, with a particularly active chapter in Boston. (A New York City chapter headed by Dorchen Leidholdt also existed prior to the founding of WAP.) The group was active until 1984.

Women Against Violence in Pornography and Media (WAVPM) was a San Francisco group that played a very important role in the founding of WAP. According to Alice Echols, "the two groups share[d] the same analysis." WAVPM pioneered many of WAP's tactics (such as slide shows, porn shop tours, and mass demonstrations in red light districts). It was active from 1976 to 1983 and led by Lynn Campbell (who went on to become first head of WAP) and Laura Lederer.

Feminists Fighting Pornography, led by Page Mellish, did organizing in New York City.

Feminists Against Pornography was a different group, active in Washington, D.C. during the late 1970s and early 1980s.

The Pornography Resource Center, a Minneapolis group, was founded in 1984 to support Catharine MacKinnon's campaign to pass the Antipornography Civil Rights Ordinance in Minneapolis. The group changed its name to Organizing Against Pornography in 1985 and was active until 1990.

In the United Kingdom, the feminist Campaign Against Pornography (CAP) was launched by British MP Clare Short in 1986 and was best known for its "Off the Shelf" campaign against "Page Three girls" in British tabloids. A breakaway group, Campaign Against Pornography and Censorship (CPC), started by Catherine Itzin in 1989, adhered more closely to the civil rights anti-pornography approach favored by Women Against Pornography. CPC was active in Ireland as well as the UK. Both groups were active until the mid-1990s.

In New Zealand, groups calling themselves "Women Against Pornography" were active during the eighties and early nineties (1983–1995). A Wellington group was formed in 1983 and an Auckland group in 1984. Their work focussed on depictions of sexual exploitation and sexual violence in film, video and art. They had no formal connection to the American group. They are best known for their 1984 attempt to force the resignation of New Zealand Chief Censor Arthur Everard after he allowed the horror film I Spit on Your Grave to be shown in that country. In this national context, the Society for Promotion of Community Standards had tried to prevent the criminalisation of spousal rape in 1982, so there were tensions between the Christian Right and feminist anti-pornography activists, as well as a strengthened movement for LGBT rights in New Zealand that also benefited from prevalent social liberalism, pointing out that gay pornography did not operate according to the same psychological and sociological parameters as its heterosexual equivalent. When it dissolved in 1995, Women Against Pornography had not adopted a strategy that converged with the New Zealand Christian Right, unlike many of its national counterparts abroad. Much of this was due to the weakness of the New Zealand Society for Promotion of Community Standards after co-belligerency against the Homosexual Law Reform Act 1986.

The group Scottish Women Against Pornography (SWAP) was started in 1999 and was still active as of 2008. It also has no formal connection with the American group and was started well after its demise.

In 2002, anti-pornography feminist Diana Russell and several cohorts informally used the name "Women Against Pornography" for a demonstration against the opening of the Hustler Club, a San Francisco strip club.

== See also ==
- WAP (song)
- Financial Coalition Against Child Pornography
- Gail Dines

== Bibliography ==
- MacKinnon, Catharine A., & Andrea Dworkin, eds., In Harm's Way: The Pornography Civil Rights Hearings (Cambridge, Mass.: Harvard Univ. Press, pbk. 1997 (ISBN 0-674-44579-1)) (includes discussion of WAP)
