= Feminism Unmodified =

1987 book by Catharine A. MacKinnon

Feminism Unmodified: Discourses on Life and Law
- Cover of the first edition
- Author: Catharine A. MacKinnon
- Language: English
- Subject: Feminism
- Publisher: Harvard University Press
- Publication date: 1987
- Publication place: United States
- Media type: Print
- Pages: 332

Feminism Unmodified: Discourses on Life and Law is a 1987 book by feminist legal scholar Catharine A. MacKinnon. The book is a collection of essays by MacKinnon delivered during the 1980s, in which she makes a radical feminist critique of pornography and liberal feminism.

== Contents ==
Apart from the introduction ("The Art of the Impossible") and afterword, the text is divided into three sections, each with five or six subsections:

1. Approaches
  1. Not by Law Alone: From a Debate with Phyllis Schlafly
  2. Difference and Dominance: On Sex Discrimination
  3. Desire and Power
  4. Whose Culture? A Case Note on Martinez v. Santa Clara Pueblo
  5. On Exceptionality: Women as Women in Law
2. Applications
  1. A Rally against Rape
  2. Sex and Violence: A Perspective
  3. Privacy v. Equality: Beyond Roe v. Wade
  4. Sexual Harassment: Its First Decade in Court
  5. Women, Self-Possession, and Sport
3. Pornography
  1. Linda's Life and Andrea's Work
  2. "More Than Simply a Magazine": Playboy's Money
  3. Not a Moral Issue
  4. Francis Biddle's Sister: Pornography, Civil Rights, and Speech
  5. On Collaboration
  6. The Sexual Politics of the First Amendment

== Criticisms ==
MacKinnon has received criticism from some other feminist scholars, including Nadine Strossen and Aya Gruber, since the publication of Feminism Unmodified.

In a 1993 article, "A Feminist Critique of 'the' Feminist Critique of Pornography," published in the Virginia Law Review, feminist scholar Nadine Strossen thoroughly addressed many of the issues with MacKinnon's arguments. She frames MacKinnon's core argument as one that favors censorship, which Strossen believes "would undermine women's rights and interests." Censorship, Strossen argues, would do this in several ways, including by framing women as perpetual victims, silencing women and feminist works, harm sex workers, and strengthen the religious right.

Strossen also argues that "censoring 'pornography' would reduce discrimination or violence against women is speculative at best." She brings in a number of empirical studies to support this argument.

In 2009, Aya Gruber, another feminist legal scholar, published "Rape, Feminism, and the War on Crime" in Washington Law Review. Gruber's work, unlike Strossen's, tackles a broad range of feminist scholars whose views align with those of MacKinnon, rather than solely focusing on MacKinnon's argument. Gruber essentially criticizes MacKinnon and similar feminist perspectives for their reliance on the criminal justice system to handle feminist issues such as rape. Gruber writes: "Dominance feminists like MacKinnon assert that adversarial processes and police power can be utilized by feminists so long as they counter the patriarchy." Yet, in Gruber's view, "any perceived promise of criminal justice to further feminism is a false promise." She notes that the criminalization of rape, pornography, and other real or alleged violence against women have not actually addressed misogyny and, instead, these laws tend to harm women.
