= Catharine A. MacKinnon =

American feminist scholar and legal activist (born 1946)

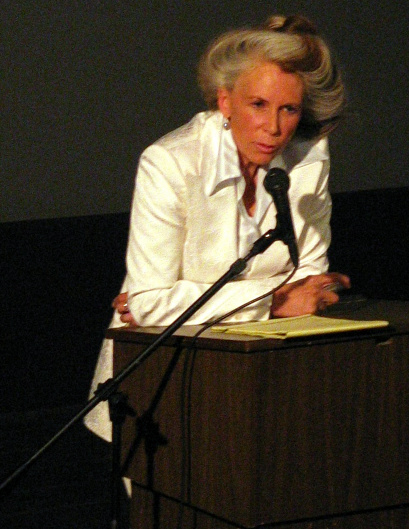
- MacKinnon at the Brattle Theatre, Cambridge, 2006
- Born: Catharine Alice MacKinnon; October 7, 1946 (age 80); Minneapolis, Minnesota, U.S.

Academic background
- Education: Smith College (BA); Yale University (JD, PhD)
- Thesis: Feminism, Marxism, Method and the State (Epistemology, Politics) (1987)
- Doctoral advisor: Robert Dahl
- Other advisor: Thomas I. Emerson

Academic work
- Discipline: Legal scholar
- School or tradition: Radical feminism, feminist legal theory
- Institutions: University of Michigan; York University; University of Minnesota
- Notable ideas: Sexual harassment as sex discrimination

Catharine Alice MacKinnon (born October 7, 1946) is an American feminist legal scholar, activist, and author. She is the Elizabeth A. Long Professor Emerita of Law at the University of Michigan Law School, where she has been tenured since 1990, and the James Barr Ames Visiting Professor of Law at Harvard Law School. From 2008 to 2012, she was the first Special Gender Adviser to the Prosecutor of the International Criminal Court.

As an expert on international law, constitutional law, political and legal theory, and jurisprudence, MacKinnon focuses on women's rights and sexual abuse and exploitation, including sexual harassment, rape, prostitution, sex trafficking and pornography. She was among the first to argue that pornography is a civil rights violation, and that sexual harassment in education and employment constitutes sex discrimination.

MacKinnon is the author of over a dozen books, including Sexual Harassment of Working Women (1979); Feminism Unmodified (1987); Toward a Feminist Theory of the State (1989); Only Words (1993); a casebook, Sex Equality (2001, 2007, 2016); Women's Lives, Men's Laws (2005); and Butterfly Politics (2017).

== Early life ==
MacKinnon was born in Minneapolis, Minnesota, the first of three children (a girl and two boys) to Elizabeth Valentine Davis and George E. MacKinnon; her father was a lawyer, congressman (1947–1949), and judge on the U.S. Court of Appeals for the D.C. Circuit (1969–1995).

She is the third generation of her family to attend her mother's alma mater, Smith College. She earned a J.D. from Yale Law School in 1977 and a Ph.D. in political science, also from Yale University, in 1987. While at Yale, she received a National Science Foundation fellowship.

== Career overview ==
Since 1990, MacKinnon has been the Elizabeth A. Long Professor of Law at the University of Michigan Law School, assuming Emerita status in 2023. She is also the James Barr Ames Visiting Professor of Law at Harvard Law School. In 2007, she served as the Roscoe Pound Visiting Professor of Law at Harvard Law School and has also visited at NYU, University of Western Australia, University of San Diego, Hebrew University, Columbia Law School, University of Chicago, University of Basel, Yale Law School, Osgoode Hall Law School, UCLA School of Law, and Stanford Law School.

MacKinnon is an often-cited legal scholar and regular public speaker. Her ideas can be divided into three overlapping areas: sexual harassment, pornography and prostitution, and international work. She has also written extensively on social and political theory and methodology.

== Research and legal work ==
=== Sexual harassment ===
In 1977, MacKinnon graduated from Yale Law School having written a paper on sexual harassment for Thomas I. Emerson arguing that it was a form of sex-based discrimination. Two years later, Yale University Press published MacKinnon's book, Sexual Harassment of Working Women: A Case of Sex Discrimination (1979), creating the legal claim for sexual harassment as a form of sex discrimination under Title VII of the Civil Rights Act of 1964 and any other sex-discrimination prohibition. She also conceived the legal claim for sexual harassment as sex discrimination in education under Title IX, which was established through litigation brought by Yale undergraduates in Alexander v. Yale. While the plaintiff who went to trial on the facts, Pamela Price, lost, the case established the law: the U.S. Court of Appeals for the Second Circuit recognized that, under the civil rights statute Title IX of the Education Amendments of 1972, schools must have procedures to address sexual harassment as a form of sex discrimination.

In her book, MacKinnon argued that sexual harassment is sex discrimination because the act is a product of, and produces, the social inequality of women to men (see, for example, pp. 116–18, 174). She distinguishes between two types of sexual harassment (see pp. 32–42):

1. "quid pro quo", meaning sexual harassment "in which sexual compliance is exchanged, or proposed to be exchanged, for an employment opportunity (p. 32)" and
2. the type of harassment that "arises when sexual harassment is a persistent condition of work (p. 32)".

In 1980, the Equal Employment Opportunity Commission followed MacKinnon's framework in adopting guidelines prohibiting sexual harassment by prohibiting both quid pro quo harassment and hostile work environment harassment (see 29 C.F.R. § 1604.11 (a)). Courts also used the concepts.

In 1986, the U.S. Supreme Court held in Meritor Savings Bank v. Vinson that sexual harassment may violate laws against sex discrimination. MacKinnon was co-counsel for Mechelle Vinson, the plaintiff, and wrote the brief in the Supreme Court. In Meritor, the Court recognized the distinction between quid pro quo sexual harassment and hostile workplace harassment. In a 2002 article, MacKinnon wrote, quoting the Court:

"Without question," then-Justice Rehnquist wrote for a unanimous Court, "when a supervisor sexually harasses a subordinate because of the subordinate's sex, that supervisor 'discriminate[s]' on the basis of sex." The D.C. Circuit, and women, had won. A new common-law rule was established.

Sexual Harassment of Working Women: A Case of Sex Discrimination, is the eighth most-cited American legal book published since 1978, according to a study published by Fred R. Shapiro in January 2000.

=== Pornography ===
==== Position ====
MacKinnon, along with fellow radical feminist writer and activist Andrea Dworkin, tried to change legal approaches to pornography by framing it as a civil rights violation in the form of sex discrimination, and as human trafficking. They defined pornography as:

the graphic sexually explicit subordination of women through pictures or words that also includes women dehumanized as sexual objects, things, or commodities; enjoying pain or humiliation or rape; being tied up, cut up, mutilated, bruised, or physically hurt; in postures of sexual submission or servility or display; reduced to body parts, penetrated by objects or animals, or presented in scenarios of degradation, injury, torture; shown as filthy or inferior; bleeding, bruised, or hurt in a context that makes these conditions sexual.

In Toward a Feminist Theory of the State, MacKinnon writes, "Pornography, in the feminist view, is a form of forced sex, a practice of sexual politics, and an institution of gender inequality". As documented by extensive empirical studies, she writes, "Pornography contributes causally to attitudes and behaviors of violence and discrimination which define the treatment and status of half the population". (However, the evidence for this claim is not definitive; studies have also shown no relationship between pornography and discriminatory views nor violence against women, with some even suggesting pornography use could be correlated with more egalitarian views.)

==== Anti-pornography ordinances ====
In 1980, Linda Boreman (who had appeared, under the name Linda Lovelace, in the pornographic film Deep Throat) said her ex-husband Chuck Traynor had violently coerced her into making Deep Throat and other pornographic films. Boreman made her charges public for the press corps at a press conference, together with MacKinnon, members of Women Against Pornography, and feminist writer Andrea Dworkin offering statements in support. After the press conference, Dworkin, MacKinnon, Boreman, and Gloria Steinem began discussing the possibility of using federal civil rights law to seek damages from Traynor and the makers of Deep Throat. This was not possible for Boreman because the statute of limitations for a possible suit had passed.

MacKinnon and Dworkin continued to discuss civil rights litigation, specifically sex discrimination, as a possible approach to combating pornography. MacKinnon opposed traditional arguments and laws against pornography based on the idea of morality or filth or sexual innocence, including the use of traditional criminal obscenity law to suppress pornography. Instead of condemning pornography for violating "community standards" of sexual decency or modesty, they characterized pornography as a form of sex discrimination and sought to give women the right to seek damages under civil rights law when they could prove they had been harmed. Their anti-pornography ordinances make actionable only sexually explicit material that can be proven to discriminate on the basis of sex.

In 1983, the Minneapolis city government hired MacKinnon and Dworkin to draft an anti-pornography civil rights ordinance as an amendment to the Minneapolis city human rights ordinance. The amendment defined pornography as a civil rights violation against women and allowed women who claimed harm from trafficking in pornography to sue the producers and distributors for damages in civil court. It also allowed those who had been coerced into pornography, had had pornography forced upon them, or were assaulted in a way caused by specific pornography to sue for harm they could prove. The law was passed twice by the Minneapolis city council but was vetoed by the mayor. Another version of the ordinance passed in Indianapolis, Indiana in 1984, but was ruled unconstitutional by the Seventh Circuit Court of Appeals, a decision summarily affirmed (without opinion) by the U.S. Supreme Court.

MacKinnon wrote in the Harvard Civil Rights-Civil Liberties Law Review in 1985:

And as you think about the assumption of consent that follows women into pornography, look closely some time for the skinned knees, the bruises, the welts from the whippings, the scratches, the gashes. Many of them are not simulated. One relatively soft core pornography model said, "I knew the pose was right when it hurt". It certainly seems important to the audiences that the events in the pornography be real. For this reason, pornography becomes a motive for murder, as in "snuff" films in which someone is tortured to death to make a sex film. They exist.

MacKinnon represented Boreman from 1980 until Boreman's death in 2002. Civil libertarians frequently find MacKinnon's theories objectionable (see "Criticism" section), arguing there is no evidence that sexually explicit media encourages or promotes violence against women. Max Waltman states that empirical evidence (based on changes to obscenity doctrine in Canada) suggests that civil rather than legal remedies may be more effective as a means of discouraging violence against women.

=== Transgender sex equality ===
In a 2015 interview, MacKinnon cited Simone de Beauvoir's famous quotation about "becom[ing] a woman" to say that "[a]nybody who identifies as a woman, wants to be a woman, is going around being a woman, as far as I'm concerned, is a woman."

During a lecture at Oxford University in 2022, MacKinnon continued to express her support for transfeminism and transgender sex equality, and criticized the postmodernism, liberalist anti-stereotyping approach, and anti-trans feminism. Her lecture, called "A Feminist Defense of Transgender Sex Equality Rights" was subsequently edited and published in the Yale Journal of Law & Feminism in 2023. In this lecture, she addresses concerns from anti-trans feminists about the idea that the recognition of trans identities leads to sexism against women.

MacKinnon presents three legal theoretical approaches to transgender sex equality: first, the Textual and Literal Approach, which aligns with libertarianism and views discrimination against trans people as sex discrimination, but often doubles rather than eliminates it; second, the Anti-Stereotyping Approach, a liberal perspective that focuses on how trans people are stereotyped, benefiting those who don’t conform to stereotypes yet still meet dominant standards, while offering no help to those who face discrimination based on subordinated stereotypes; and third, the Substantive Approach, a feminist-informed approach that views anti-trans treatment as sex discriminatory by focusing on hierarchical social structures driven by sexualized misogyny. Under male dominance, trans women lose status during their transition, while trans men may gain it, though they may still be seen as "lesser men." Trans women face intersectional discrimination as both women and trans individuals, particularly if they are of color. Trans men, although gaining status as men, may still face violence if they are perceived as feminine. MacKinnon argues that the Substantive Approach highlights sexualized misogyny and asserts that understanding gender hierarchy benefits all women.

=== International work ===
In February 1992, the Supreme Court of Canada largely accepted MacKinnon's theories of equality, hate propaganda, and pornography, citing extensively from a brief she co-authored in a ruling against Manitoba pornography distributor Donald Butler. The Butler decision was controversial to some; it is sometimes implied that shipments of Dworkin's book Pornography: Men Possessing Women were seized by Canadian customs agents under this ruling, as well as books by Marguerite Duras and David Leavitt. In fact, MacKinnon's brief argued that seizure of materials for which no harm was shown was unconstitutional.

Successful Butler prosecutions have been undertaken against the lesbian sadomasochistic magazine Bad Attitude, as well as the owners of a gay and lesbian bookstore for selling it. Canadian authorities raided an art gallery and confiscated controversial paintings depicting child abuse. Many free speech and gay rights activists have alleged that the law is selectively enforced, targeting the LGBT community.

MacKinnon represented Bosnian and Croatian women against Serbs accused of genocide since 1992, creating the legal claim for rape as an act of genocide in that conflict. She was co-counsel, representing named plaintiff S. Kadic, in Kadic v. Karadzic and won a jury verdict of $745 million in New York City on August 10, 2000. The lawsuit (under the United States' Alien Tort Statute) established forced prostitution and forced impregnation when based on ethnicity or religion in a genocidal context as legally actionable acts of genocide. In 2001, MacKinnon was named co-director of the Lawyers Alliance for Women (LAW) Project, an initiative of Equality Now, an international non-governmental organization.

MacKinnon and Dworkin proposed the law against prostitution in Sweden in 1990, which Sweden passed in 1998. What became termed the Swedish Model, also known as the Nordic Model, the "Equality Model", or the "Restrictive Model", penalises buyers of sexual services as well as sellers, where sellers are characterised as pimps or sex traffickers, while putatively decriminalizing all those who are "bought and sold in prostitution". The fundamental concept is that the requirement to exchange sexual services for survival is a product of sex inequality and a form of violence against women. This model has been accepted in Norway, Iceland, Canada, Ireland, Northern Ireland, Israel, and France, but was rejected in New Zealand.

Some organisations and individuals, such as the Global Network of Sex Work Projects, International, and the Global Alliance Against Traffic in Women say that this legal model makes it harder for sex workers to find housing, make money to survive, screen clients to avoid violence, prevent their boyfriends from being arrested as "pimps", and avoid the interactions with police which account for the plurality of sexual violence against sex workers.

MacKinnon works actively with the Coalition Against Trafficking in Women (CATW) and Apne Aap in India.

== Political theory ==
MacKinnon argues that the inequality between women and men in most societies forms a hierarchy that institutionalizes male dominance, subordinating women, in an arrangement rationalised and often perceived as natural. She writes about the interrelations between theory and practice, recognizing that women's experiences have, for the most part, been ignored in both arenas. Furthermore, she uses Marxism to critique certain points in liberal feminism in feminist theory and uses radical feminism to criticize Marxist theory. MacKinnon notes Marx's criticism of theory that treated class division as a spontaneous event that occurred naturally. She understands epistemology as theories of knowing, and politics as theories of power: "Having power means, among other things, that when someone says, 'this is how it is,' it is taken as being that way. ... Powerlessness means that when you say 'this is how it is,' it is not taken as being that way. This makes articulating silence, perceiving the presence of absence, believing those who have been socially stripped of credibility, critically contextualizing what passes for simple fact, necessary to the epistemology of a politics of the powerless."

In 1996, Fred R. Shapiro calculated that "Feminism, Marxism, Method, and the State: Toward Feminist Jurisprudence", 8 Signs 635 (1983), was the 96th most cited article in law reviews even though it was published in a non-legal journal.

== Criticism ==
During the "Feminist Sex Wars" in the 1980s, feminists opposing anti-pornography stances, such as Carole Vance and Ellen Willis, began referring to themselves as "pro-sex" or "sex-positive feminists". Sex-positive feminists and anti-pornography feminists have debated over the implicit and explicit meanings of these labels. Sex-positive feminists note that anti-pornography ordinances drafted by MacKinnon and Dworkin called for the removal, censorship, or control over sexually explicit material.

In States of Injury (1995), Wendy Brown contends that MacKinnon's attempt to ban prostitution and pornography does not primarily protect but re-inscribes the category of "woman" as an essentialized identity premised on injury. In a review of MacKinnon's Toward a Feminist Theory of the State (1989) in The Nation, Brown says that MacKinnon's endeavor is "emblematic of a profoundly static world view and an undemocratic, perhaps even antidemocratic, political sensibility"; and that much of the book is "flatly dated", with "its first two-thirds ... framed by a political-intellectual context that no longer exists—a male Marxist monopoly on radical social discourse".

Judith Butler's 1994 article "Against Proper Objects", in a section titled "Against the anti-pornography paradigm", criticizes MacKinnon as having "totalizing" and "deterministic" positions on sexuality, specifically heterosexuality, as follows:

Feminist positions such as Catharine MacKinnon's offer an analysis of sexual relations as structured by relations of coerced subordination, and argue that acts of sexual domination constitute the social meaning of being a "man," as the condition of coerced subordination constitutes the social meaning of being a "woman." Such a rigid determinism assimilates any account of sexuality to rigid and determining positions of domination and subordination, and assimilates those positions to the social gender of man and woman. But that deterministic account has come under continuous criticism from feminists not only for an untenable account of female sexuality as coerced subordination, but for the totalizing view of heterosexuality as well—one in which all power relations are reduced to relations of domination—and for the failure to distinguish the presence of coerced domination in sexuality from pleasurable and wanted dynamics of power.

== Personal life ==
In the early 1990s, MacKinnon had a relationship with author and animal-rights activist Jeffrey Masson, and they were engaged to be married. Earlier, she had been married and divorced. MacKinnon has long been highly protective of details about her private life.

== Honors ==
- Smith Medal, Smith College (1991)
- Doctor of Laws (LL.D., hon.), Haverford College (1991)
- Wilbur Lucius Cross Medal, Yale Graduate School Alumni Association (1995)
- Symposium, Yale Law School, honoring the 20th anniversary of the publication of Sexual Harassment of Working Women (1998)
- Fellow, American Academy of Arts and Sciences (AAAS) (elected) (2005)
- Outstanding Scholar Award, Research Fellows of the American Bar Foundation (2007)
- Pioneer of Justice Award, Pace Law School (New York) (2008)
- Ruth Bader Ginsburg Lifetime Achievement Award, American Association of Law Schools (AALS), Women's Section (2014)
- Alice Paul Award, National Organization of Men Against Sexism (NOMAS) for "Lifetime Dedication and Outstanding Achievement in Confronting Men's Violence Against Women" (2017)
- Award of Merit, Yale Law School Association, to "an esteemed graduate of Yale Law School ... recognized for having made a substantial contribution to public service or to the legal profession" (2022)
- Phillips Prize in Jurisprudence, American Philosophical Society (2022)
- International Fellow, the British Academy (2024)

== Selected works ==
- (1979). Sexual Harassment of Working Women: A Case of Sex Discrimination. New Haven, CT: Yale University Press. 1979. ISBN 0-300-02299-9. OCLC 3912752.
- (1987). MacKinnon, Catharine A. (1987). Feminism unmodified : discourses on life and law. Harvard University Press. p. 262.
- (1988) with Andrea Dworkin. Pornography and Civil Rights: A New Day for Women's Equality. Minneapolis, MN: Organizing Against Pornography. 1988. ISBN 0-9621849-0-X.
- (1989). Toward a Feminist Theory of the State. Cambridge, MA: Harvard University Press. 1989. ISBN 0-674-89645-9.
- (1993). Only Words. Cambridge, MA: Harvard University Press. 1993. ISBN 0-674-63933-2. OCLC 28067216.
- (1997) with Andrea Dworkin (eds.). In Harm's Way: The Pornography Civil Rights Hearings. Cambridge, MA: Harvard University Press. 1997. ISBN 0-674-44579-1. OCLC 37418262.
- (2001). Sex Equality. University Casebook Series. New York: Foundation Press.
- (2004) with Reva Siegel (eds.). Directions in Sexual Harassment Law. New Haven, CT: Yale University Press.
- (2005). Women's Lives, Men's Laws. Cambridge, MA: Harvard University Press. 2005. ISBN 0-674-01540-1. OCLC 55494875.
- (2005). Legal Feminism in Theory and Practice. Resling.
- (2006). Are Women Human?: And Other International Dialogues. Cambridge, MA: Harvard University Press. 2006. ISBN 0-674-02187-8. OCLC 62085505.
- (2007). Sex Equality (2nd edition). University Casebook Series. New York: Foundation Press.
- (2014). Traite, Prostitution, Inégalité. Mount Royal, Que: Editions M.
- (2015). Sex Equality Controversies: The Formosa Lectures. Taipei: National Taiwan University Press.
- (2016). Sex Equality (3rd edition). University Casebook Series. St. Paul, MN: Foundation Press.
- (2017). Butterfly Politics. Cambridge, MA: Harvard University Press.
- (2018). Gender in Constitutional Law. Cheltenham: Edward Elgar Publishing.
- (2022). Women's Lives in Men's Courts: Briefs for Change. Northport, NY: Twelve Tables Press (forthcoming).
