= Promiscuity =

Sexual behavior

Promiscuity is the practice of engaging in sexual activity frequently with different partners or being indiscriminate in the choice of sexual partners. The term can carry a moral judgment. A common example of behavior viewed as promiscuous by many cultures is the one-night stand, and its frequency is used by researchers as a marker for promiscuity.

What sexual behavior is considered promiscuous varies between cultures, as does the prevalence of promiscuity. Different standards are often applied to different genders and civil statutes. Feminists have traditionally argued a significant double standard exists between how men and women are judged for promiscuity. Historically, stereotypes of the promiscuous woman have tended to be pejorative, such as "the slut" or "the harlot", while male stereotypes have been more varied, some expressing approval, such as "the stud" or "the player", while others imply societal deviance, such as "the womanizer" or "the philanderer". A scientific study published in 2005 found that promiscuous men and women are both prone to derogatory judgment.

Promiscuity is common in many animal species. Some species have promiscuous mating systems, ranging from polyandry and polygyny to mating systems with no stable relationships where mating between two individuals is a one-time event. Many species form stable pair bonds, but still mate with other individuals outside the pair. In biology, incidents of promiscuity in species that form pair bonds are usually called extra-pair copulations.

== Motivations ==
Accurately assessing people's sexual behavior is difficult, since strong social and personal motivations occur, depending on social sanctions and taboos, for either minimizing or exaggerating reported sexual activity.

American experiments in 1978 and 1982 found the great majority of men were willing to have sex with women they did not know, of average attractiveness, who propositioned them. No woman, by contrast, agreed to such propositions from men of average attractiveness. While men were in general comfortable with the requests, regardless of their willingness, women responded with shock and disgust.

The number of sexual partners people have had in their lifetimes varies widely within a population. We see a higher number of people who are more comfortable with their sexuality in the modern world. A 2007 nationwide survey in the United States found the median number of female sexual partners reported by men was seven and the median number of male partners reported by women was four. The men possibly exaggerated their reported number of partners, women reported a number lower than the actual number, or a minority of women had a sufficiently larger number than most other women to create a mean significantly higher than the median, or all of the above. About 29% of men and 9% of women reported to have had more than 15 sexual partners in their lifetimes. Studies of the spread of sexually transmitted infections consistently demonstrate a small percentage of the studied population has more partners than the average man or woman, and a smaller number of people have fewer than the statistical average. An important question in the epidemiology of sexually transmitted infections is whether or not these groups copulate mostly at random with sexual partners from throughout a population or within their social groups.

A 2006 systematic review analyzing data from 59 countries worldwide found no association between regional sexual behavior tendencies, such as number of sexual partners, and sexual-health status. Much more predictive of sexual-health status are socioeconomic factors like poverty and mobility. Other studies have suggested that people with multiple casual sex partners are more likely to be diagnosed with sexually transmitted infections.

Severe and impulsive promiscuity, along with a compulsive urge to engage in illicit sex with attached individuals is a common symptom of various psychiatric disorders such as borderline personality disorder, histrionic personality disorder, narcissistic personality disorder, and antisocial personality disorder but most promiscuous individuals do not have these disorders.

== Cross-cultural studies ==
In 2008, a U.S. university study of international promiscuity found that Finns have had the largest number of sex partners in the industrialized world, and British people have the largest number among big western industrial nations. The study measured one-night stands, attitudes to casual sex, and number of sexual partners. A 2014 nationwide survey in the United Kingdom named Liverpool the country's most promiscuous city.

Britain's position on the international index "may be linked to increasing social acceptance of promiscuity among women as well as men". Britain's ranking was "ascribed to factors such as the decline of religious scruples about extramarital sex, the growth of equal pay and equal rights for women, and a highly sexualized popular culture".

The top-10-ranking OECD nations with a population over 10 million on the study's promiscuity index, in descending order, were the United Kingdom, Germany, the Netherlands, Czechia, Australia, the United States, France, Turkey, Mexico, and Canada.

A 2017 survey by Superdrug found that the United Kingdom was the country with the most sex partners with an average of 7, while Austria had around 6.5. The 2012 Trojan Sex Life Survey found that African American men reported an average of 38 sex partners in their lifetime. A study funded by condom-maker Durex, conducted in 2006 and published in 2009, measured promiscuity by a total number of sexual partners. The survey found Austrian men had the highest number of sex partners globally, with 29.3 sexual partners on average. New Zealand women had the highest number of sex partners for females in the world with an average of 20.4 sexual partners. In all of the countries surveyed, except New Zealand, men reported more sexual partners than women.

One review found the people from developed Western countries had more sex partners than people from developing countries in general, while the rate of STIs was higher in developing countries.

According to the 2005 Global Sex Survey by Durex, people have had on average nine sexual partners, the most in Turkey (14.5) and Australia (13.3), and the fewest in India (3) and China (3.1).

According to the 2012 General Social Survey in the United States by the National Opinion Research Center at the University of Chicago, Protestants on average had more sex partners than Catholics. Similarly, a 2019 study by the Institute for Family Studies in the US found that of never married young people, Protestants have more sexual partners than Catholics.

== Female promiscuity ==
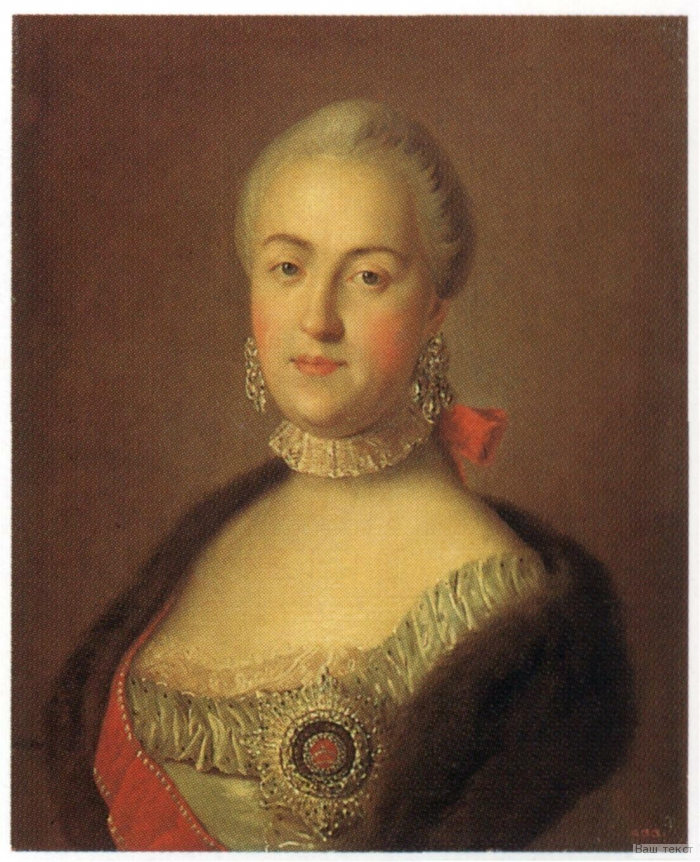
Empress Catherine the Great, a crucial figure at the time of the Enlightenment, is popularly remembered for her promiscuity.

In 1994, a study in the United States found almost all married heterosexual women reported having sexual contact only with their husbands, and unmarried women almost always reported having no more than one sexual partner in the past three months. Lesbians who had long-term partners reported having fewer outside partners than heterosexual women. More recent research, however, contradicts the assertion that heterosexual women are largely monogamous. A 2002 study estimated that 45% to 55% of married heterosexual women engage in sexual relationships outside of their marriage, while the estimate for heterosexual men engaging in the same conduct is 50–60% in the same study.

One possible explanation for hypersexuality is child sexual abuse (CSA) trauma. Many studies have examined the correlation between CSA and risky sexual behavior. Rodriguez-Srednicki and Ofelia examined the correlation of CSA experienced by women and their self-destructive behavior as adults using a questionnaire. The diversity and ages of the women varied. Slightly fewer than half the women reported CSA while the remainder reported no childhood trauma. The results of the study determined that self-destructive behaviors, including hypersexuality, correlates with CSA in women. CSA can create sexual schemas that result in risky sexual behavior. This can play out in their sexual interactions as girls get older. The sexual behaviors of women that experienced CSA differed from those of women without exposure to CSA. Studies show CSA survivors tend to have more sexual partners and engage in higher risk sexual behaviors.

Since at least 1450, the word 'slut' has been used, often pejoratively, to describe a sexually promiscuous woman. In and before the Elizabethan and Jacobean eras, terms like "strumpet" and "whore" were used to describe women deemed promiscuous, as seen, for example, in John Webster's 1612 play The White Devil. In contemporary culture, the term has also been reclaimed or reframed in some feminist, queer, and youth communities as a way to challenge sexual stigma and assert personal autonomy, with movements such as SlutWalk and projects like the UnSlut Project using the term to confront slut-shaming and promote sexual agency, although its reclamation remains contested and context-dependent rather than universally accepted.

Thornhill and Gangestad found that women are much more likely to sexually fantasize about and be attracted to extra-pair men during the fertile phase of the menstrual cycle than the luteal phase, whereas attraction to the primary partner does not change depending on the menstrual cycle. A 2004 study by Pillsworth, Hasselton and Buss contradicted this, finding greater in-pair sexual attraction during this phase and no increase in attraction to extra-pair men.

In Norwegian students, Kennair et al. (2023) found no signs of a sexual double standard in short-term or long-term mating contexts, nor in choosing a friend, except that women's self-stimulation was more acceptable than men's. From a sample of 11 countries across five continents, Thomas et al. (2025) also found no signs of a sexual double standard, and that the total number of sexual encounters of a potential long-term partner and the frequency distribution of their new sexual encounters have a significant effect when assesing a potential long-term partner's suitability. Similarly, Stewart-Williams et al. (2016) also found no signs of a sexual double standard regarding long-term relationships, with the effect of past partner number being very large on both genders' psychology.

== Male promiscuity ==
=== Heterosexual/straight men ===
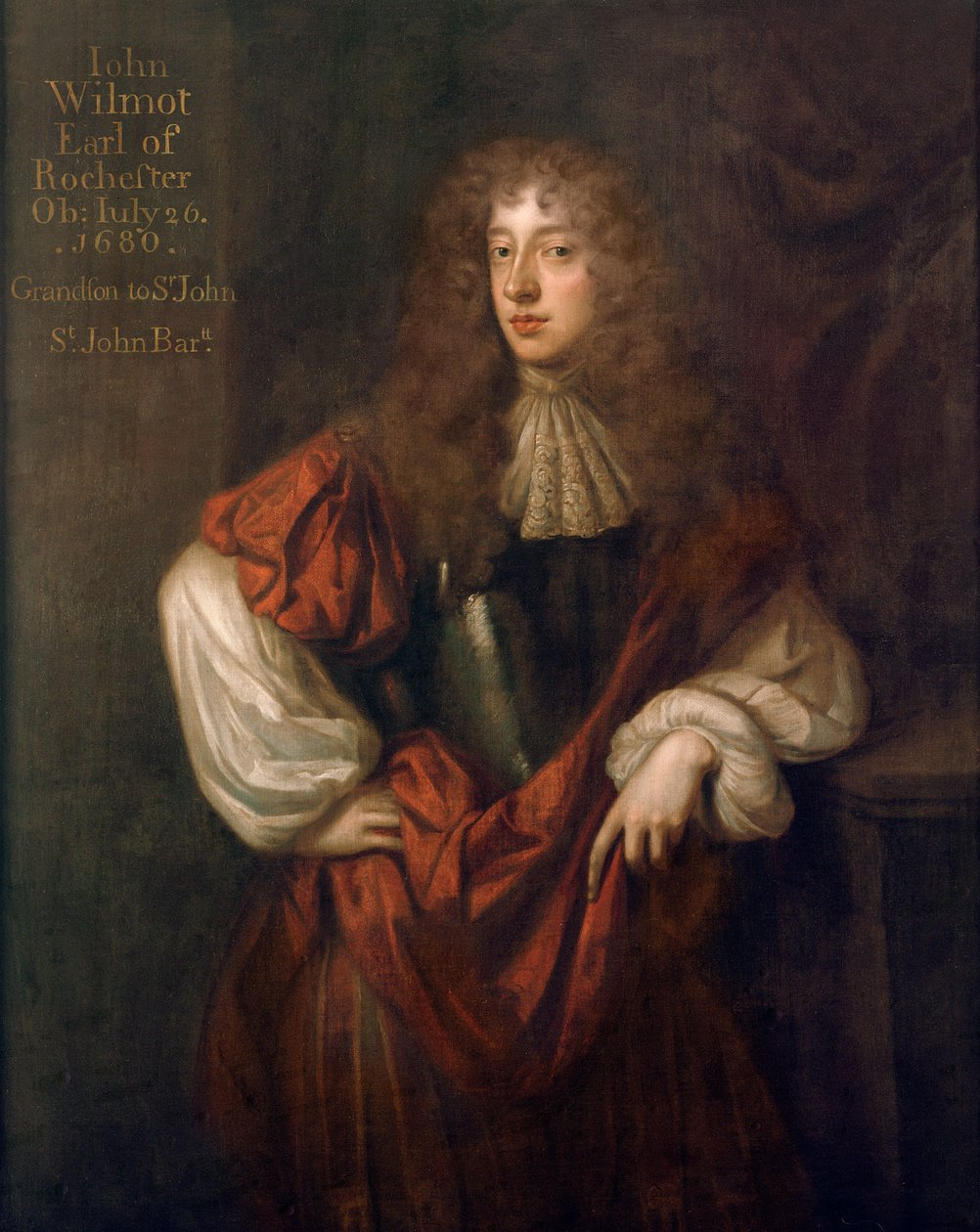
John Wilmot, a notorious libertine

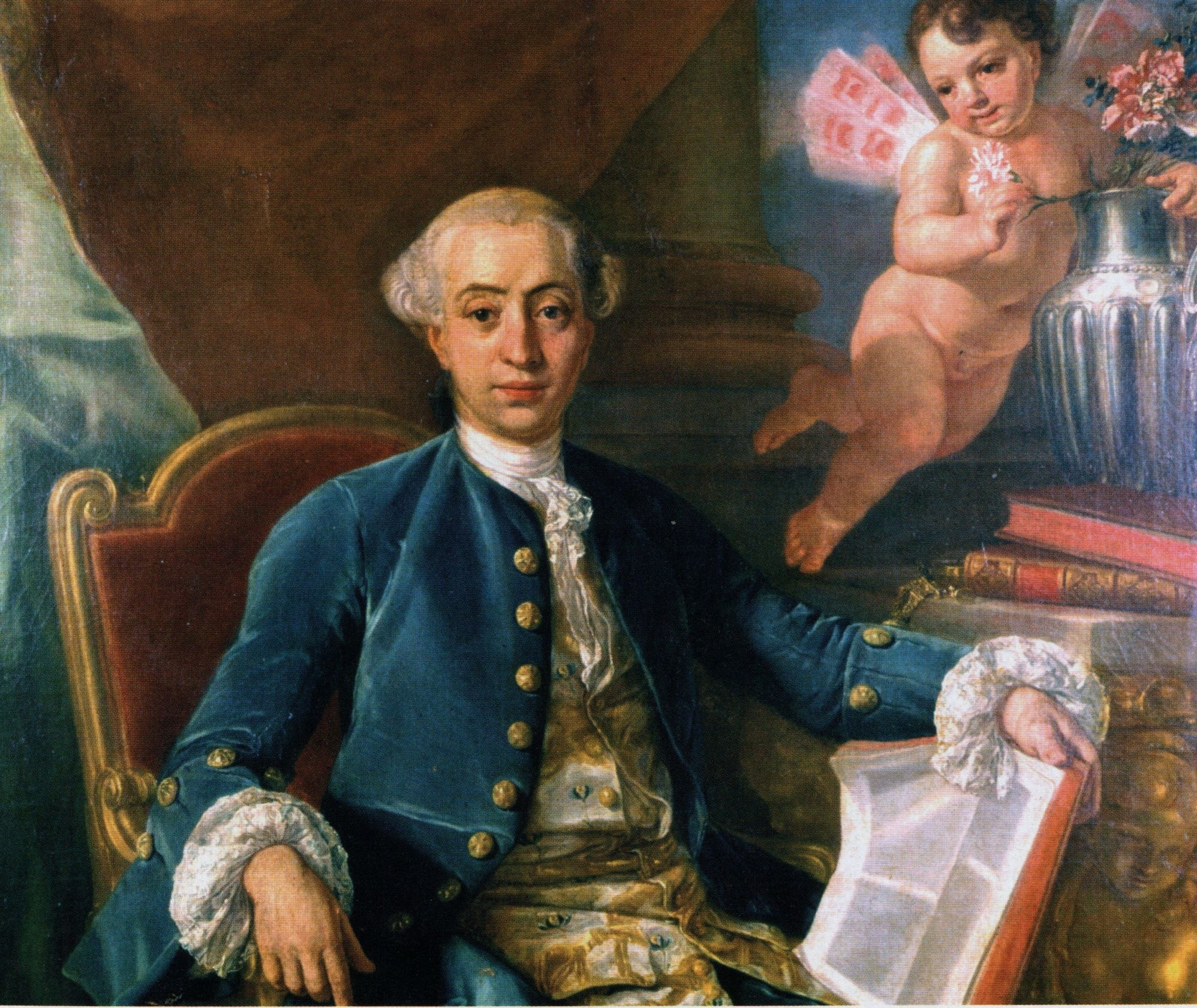
Giacomo Casanova was famously promiscuous.

A 1994 study in the United States, which looked at the number of sexual partners in a lifetime, found 20% of heterosexual men had one partner, 55% had two to 20 partners, and 25% had more than 20 sexual partners. More recent studies have reported similar numbers.

In the United Kingdom, a nationally representative study in 2013 found that 33.9% of heterosexual men had 10 or more lifetime sexual partners. Among men between 45 and 54 years old, 43.1% reported 10 or more sexual partners.

A 2003 representative study in Australia found that heterosexual men had a median of 8 female sexual partners in their lifetime. For lifetime sexual partners: 5.8% had 0 partners, 10.3% had 1 partner, 6.1% had 2 partners, 33% had between 3 and 9 partners, 38.3% had between 10 and 49 partners and 6.6% had more than 50 female sexual partners.

A 2014 representative study in Australia found that heterosexual men had a median of 7.8 female sexual partners in their lifetime. For lifetime sexual partners: 3.7% had 0 partners, 12.6% had 1 partner, 6.8% had 2 partners, 32.3% had between 3 and 9 partners, 36.9% had between 10 and 49 partners and 7.8% had more than 50 female sexual partners.

== Gay men and men who have sex with men ==
The 2013 British NATSAL study found that gay men had a median of 19 lifetime sexual partners. In the previous year, 45.8% of gay men reported having 1 sexual partner, 21.3% reported having between 2 and 4, 7.3% reported having between 5 and 9, and 19.6% reported having 10 or more sexual partners. 6% of gay men had 0 sexual partners. 71.1% of gay men had more than 10 sexual lifetime sexual partners.

A 2014 study in Australia found gay men had a median of 22 lifetime sexual partners (sexual partner was defined as kissing, touching or intercourse). 37.8% of gay men had more than 50 sexual partners. In the past year, 50.1% of gay men reported having either 0 or 1 partner, while 25.6% reported 10 or more partners.

Convenience sample research on gay sexual behavior may overrepresent promiscuous respondents. This is because gay men are a small portion of the male population, and thus many surveys rely on convenience sampling. Examples of this type of sampling includes surveying men on dating apps such as Grindr, or finding volunteers at gay bars, clubs and saunas. Convenience samples often exclude gay men who are in relationships, men who do not use dating apps or men who do not attend gay venues. For example, the British and European convenience surveys included approximately five times as many gay men who reported "5 or more sexual partners" than the nationally representative NATSAL study did. Probability sample surveys are more useful in this regard, because they seek to accurately reflect the characteristics of the gay male population. Examples include the NATSAL in the United Kingdom and the General Social Survey in the United States.

According to John Corvino, opponents of gay rights often cite convenience sample research on promiscuity. Psychologist J. Michael Bailey has stated that social conservatives use promiscuity among gay men as evidence of a "decadent" nature of gay men, but says "I think they're wrong. Promiscuous gay men are expressing an essentially masculine trait. They are doing what most heterosexual men would do if they could. They are in this way just like heterosexual men, except that they don't have women to constrain them."

Regarding sexually transmitted infections (STIs), some researchers have said that the number of sexual partners had by gay men cannot fully explain rates of HIV infection in this population. According to an article published in the BMJ, unprotected receptive anal sex, which carries a higher risk of HIV transmission, is a more important factor.

A 1989 study found having over 100 partners to be present though rare among homosexual males. A 1994 study found that difference in the mean number of sexual partners between gay and straight men "did not appear very large".

A 2007 study reported that two large population surveys found "the majority of gay men had similar numbers of unprotected sexual partners annually as straight men and women."

== Evolution ==
Evolutionary psychologists propose that a conditional human tendency for promiscuity is inherited from hunter-gatherer ancestors. Promiscuity increases the likelihood of having children, thus "evolutionary" fitness. According to them, female promiscuity is advantageous in that it allows females to choose fathers for their children who have better genes than their mates, to ensure better care for their offspring, have more children, and as a form of fertility insurance. Male promiscuity was likely advantageous because it allowed men to father more children.

== Primitive promiscuity ==
Primitive promiscuity or original promiscuity was the 19th-century hypothesis that humans originally lived in a state of promiscuity or "hetaerism" before the advent of society as we understand it. Hetaerism is a theoretical early state of human society, as postulated by 19th-century anthropologists, which was characterized by the absence of the institution of marriage in any form and in which women were the common property of their tribe and in which children never knew who their fathers were.

The reconstruction of the original state of primitive society or humanity was based on the idea of progress, according to which all cultures have degrees of improvement and becoming more complicated. It seemed logical to assume that never before the types of families developed did they simply exist, and in primitive society, sexual relations were without any boundaries and taboos. This view is represented, inter alia, by anthropologist Lewis H. Morgan in Ancient Society and Friedrich Engels' work The Origin of the Family, Private Property and the State.

In the first half of the 20th century, this notion was rejected by a number of authors, e.g. Edvard Westermarck, a Finnish philosopher, social anthropologist and sociologist with in-depth knowledge of the history of marriage, who provided strong evidence that, at least in the first stages of cultural development, monogamy has been a perfectly normal and natural form of man-woman coexistence.

Modern cultural anthropology has not confirmed the existence of a complete promiscuity in any known society or culture. The evidence of history is reduced to some texts of Herodotus, Strabo, and Solinus, which have been hard to interpret.

== Religious, social, and cultural views ==
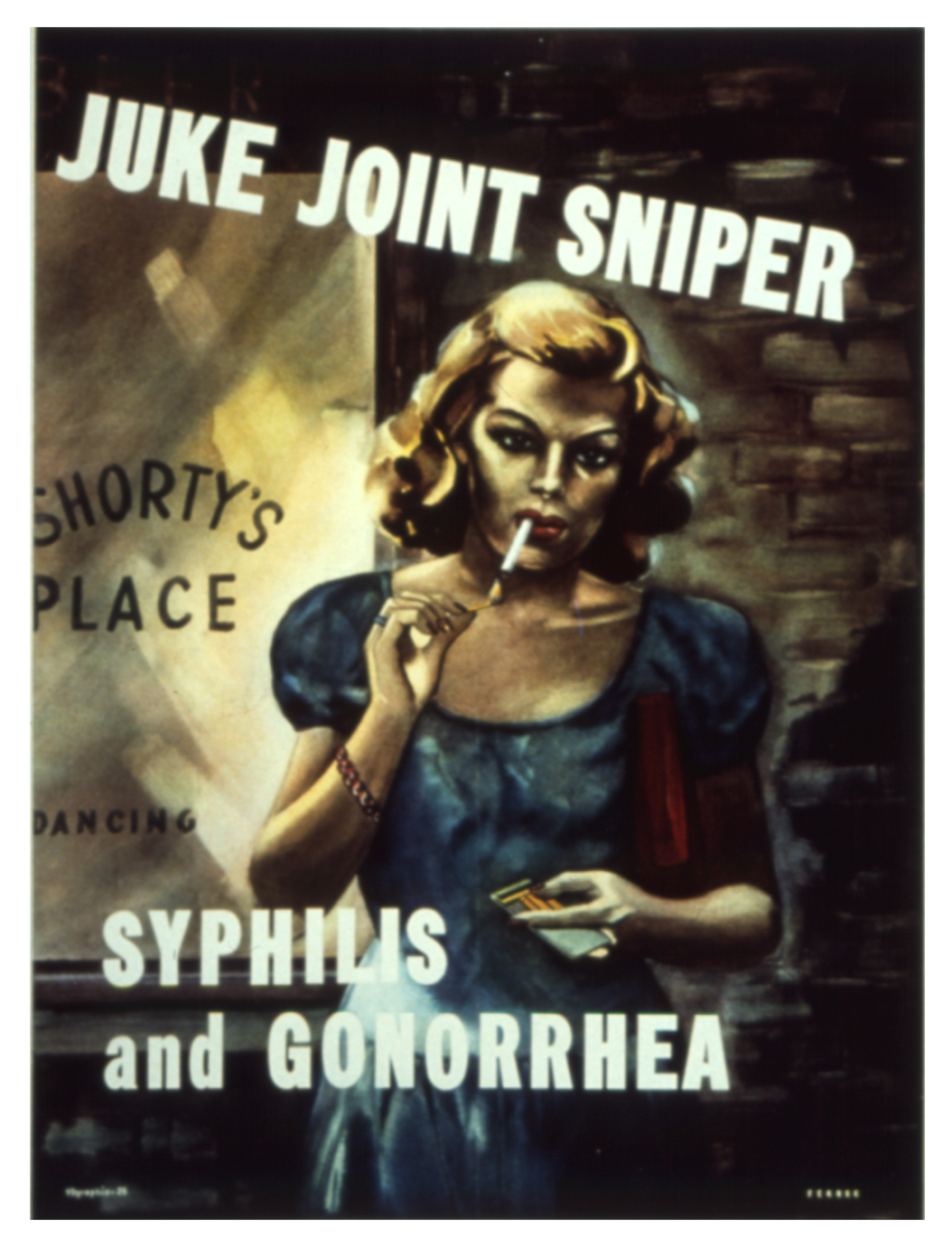
World War II-era poster urging soldiers to avoid "good time girls" and prostitutes to avoid syphilis and gonorrhea.

Christianity, Judaism, and Islam condemn promiscuity and instead advocate lifelong monogamous marriage (although Islam allows polygamy for men if the husband fulfills certain conditions and rules). The perspectives on promiscuity vary significantly depending on the region. Every country has different values and morals pertaining to sexual life.

Promiscuity has been practiced in hippie communities and other alternative subcultures since the 1960s cultural revolution.

Sex and Culture is a book by J. D. Unwin concerning the correlation between a society's level of 'cultural achievement' and its level of sexual restraint. Published in 1934, the book concluded with the theory that as societies develop, they become more sexually liberal, accelerating the social entropy of the society, and thereby diminishing its "creative" and "expansive" energy.

== Other animals ==
Some researchers have suggested that the practice of referring to animals as promiscuous in reference to their mating system is often inaccurate and potentially biased. More precise terms such as polyandry, polygyny, and polygynandry are increasingly preferred.

Many animal species, such as spotted hyenas, pigs, bonobos and chimpanzees, are promiscuous as a rule, and do not form pair bonds. Although social monogamy occurs in about 90% of avian species and about 3% of mammalian species, an estimated 90% of socially monogamous species exhibit individual promiscuity in the form of copulation outside the pair bond.

In the animal world, some species, including birds such as swans and fish such as Neolamprologus pulcher, once believed monogamous, are now known to engage in extra-pair copulations. One example of extra-pair fertilization (EPF) in birds is the black-throated blue warblers. Though it is a socially monogamous species, both males and females engage in EPF.

The Darwin-Bateman paradigm, which states that males are typically eager to copulate while females are more choosy about whom to mate with, has been confirmed by a meta-analysis. There is, however, continued debate about the utility and pitfalls of the Bateman perspective.

== Risks ==
Promiscuity may increase the risk of acquiring sexually transmitted infections.

== See also ==
- Cottaging
- Emotional promiscuity
- Monogamy
- Polyamory
- Prostitution
- Sexual addiction
- Sexual revolution
- Sociosexual orientation
- Sperm competition
- Swinging

== Bibliography ==
- Chakov, Kelly Nineteen Century Social Evolutionism
- Fortes, Meyer (2005) Kinship and the Social Order: The Legacy of Lewis Henry Morgan ISBN 0-202-30802-2 pp. 7–8
- Lehrman, Sally The Virtues of Promiscuity (2002)
- Lerner, Gerda (1986) Women and History vol. 1: The Creation of Patriarchy ISBN 978-0-19-503996-2
- Lerner, Gerda (1986). "The Origin of Prostitution in Ancient Mesopotamia". Signs. 11 (2): 236–254. doi:10.1086/494218. JSTOR 3174047.
- Schmitt, David P. (April 2005). "Sociosexuality from Argentina to Zimbabwe: A 48-nation study of sex, culture, and strategies of human mating". Behavioral and Brain Sciences. 28 (2): 247–275. doi:10.1017/S0140525X05000051. PMID 16201459.
- Miller, Gerrit S. (1931). "The Primate Basis of Human Sexual Behavior". The Quarterly Review of Biology. 6 (4): 379–410. doi:10.1086/394387. JSTOR 2808208.
- Westermarck, Edward [1891] (2003) History of Human Marriage Part 1 Kessinger Publishing ISBN 0-7661-4618-9
- Weston, Kath (1998) Long Slow Burn: Sexuality and Social Science ISBN 0-415-92043-4
- Woock, Randy (2002) Promiscuous Women Should Be Praised
- Rinaldi, Robin, The Wild Oats Project: One Woman's Midlife Quest for Passion at Any Cost, Sarah Crichton Books (2015), hardcover, 304 pages ISBN 978-0-374-29021-4
