= Sexual revolution =

20th-century Western social movement

- Part of the counterculture of the 1960s
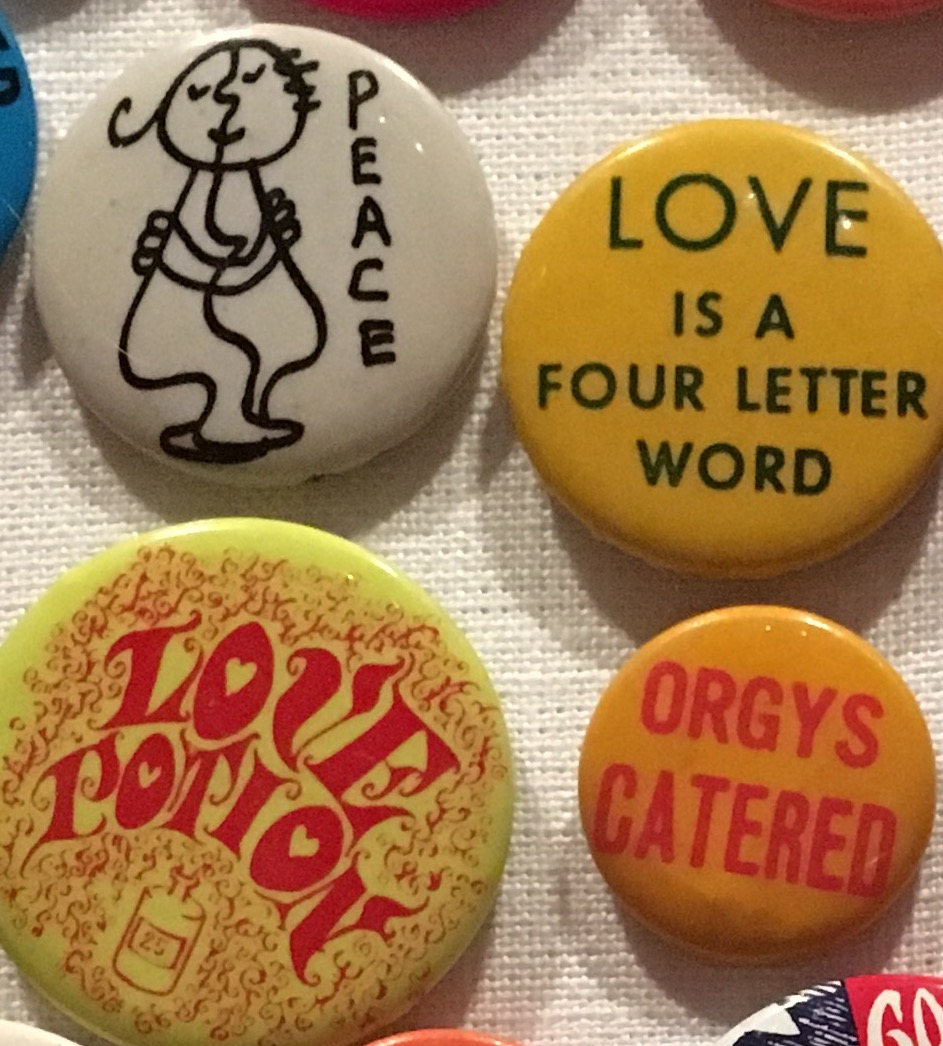
- Buttons from the sexual revolution
- Date: late 1950s – early 1970s
- Location: Western world
- Participants: Regional: Sexual revolution in 1960s United States; Social/commercial movements: Free love; Gay liberation; Golden Age of Porn
- Outcome: Wider acceptance of sexuality, homosexuality, contraception, and pornography

The sexual revolution, also known as the sexual liberation, was a social movement that challenged traditional codes of behavior related to sexuality and interpersonal relationships throughout the Western world from the late 1950s to the early 1970s. Sexual liberation included increased acceptance of sexual intercourse outside of traditional heterosexual, monogamous relationships, primarily marriage. The legalization of "the pill" as well as other forms of contraception, public nudity, pornography, premarital sex, homosexuality, masturbation, alternative forms of sexuality, and abortion all followed.

The term "first sexual revolution" is used by scholars to describe different periods of significant change in Western sexual norms, including the Christianization of Roman sexuality, the decline of Victorian morals, and the cultural shifts of the Roaring Twenties. Sexual revolution most commonly refers to the mid-20th century, when advances in contraception, medicine, and social movements led to widespread changes in attitudes and behaviors around sex. The sexual revolution was influenced by Freud's theory of unconscious drives and psychosexual development, Mead's ethnographic work on adolescent sexuality in Samoa, Unwin's cross-cultural studies, and the research of Kinsey and later Masters and Johnson, all of which challenged traditional beliefs about human sexuality.

The widespread availability of contraception from the early 20th century onward empowered individuals with reproductive choice, spurred legal and cultural shifts such as Griswold v. Connecticut, and influenced later landmark rulings on privacy, abortion, and LGBTQ+ rights. "Free love" is a related social movement advocating for the separation of the state from sexual matters like marriage and birth control, emphasizing personal freedom in relationships, though it faced decline in the 1980s due to the AIDS crisis.

By the 1970s, premarital and non-marital sex had become increasingly accepted in the United States due to the rise of birth control, later marriages, declining stigma around divorce, and the normalization of casual and non-monogamous sexual relationships.

== Origins ==
=== First sexual revolution ===
Several other periods in Western culture have been called the "first sexual revolution", to which the 1960s revolution would be the second (or later). The term "sexual revolution" itself has been used since at least the late 1920s. The term appeared as early as 1929; the book Is Sex Necessary? Or, Why You Feel the Way You Do by James Thurber and E. B. White, has a chapter titled "The Sexual Revolution: Being a Rather Complete Survey of the Entire Sexual Scene". According to Konstantin Dushenko, the term was in use in Soviet Russia in 1925.

When speaking of the sexual revolution, historians make a distinction between the first and the second sexual revolution. In the first sexual revolution (1870–1910), Victorian morality lost its universal appeal. However, it did not lead to the rise of a "permissive society". Exemplary for this period is the rise and differentiation in forms of regulating sexuality.

Classics professor Kyle Harper uses the phrase "first sexual revolution" to refer to the displacement of the norms of sexuality in Ancient Rome with those of Christianity as it was adopted throughout the Roman Empire. Romans accepted and legalized prostitution, bisexuality, and pederasty. Male promiscuity was considered normal and healthy as long as masculinity was maintained, associated with being the penetrating partner. In contrast, female chastity was required for respectable women, to ensure the integrity of family bloodlines. These attitudes were replaced by Christian prohibitions on homosexual acts and any sex outside marriage, including with slaves and prostitutes.

History professor Faramerz Dabhoiwala cites the Age of Enlightenment—approximately the 18th century—as a major period of transition in the United Kingdom. During this time, the philosophy of liberalism developed and was popularized, and migration to cities increased opportunities for sex and made enforcement of rules more difficult than in small villages. Sexual misconduct in the Catholic Church undermined the credibility of religious authorities, and the rise of urban police forces helped distinguish crime from sin. Overall, toleration increased for heterosexual sex outside marriage, including prostitution, mistresses, and pre-marital sex. Though these acts were still condemned by many as libertine, infidelity became more often a civil matter than a criminal offense receiving capital punishment. Masturbation, homosexuality, and rape were generally less tolerated. Women went from being considered as lustful as men to passive partners, whose purity was important to reputation.

Commentators such as history professor Kevin F. White have used the phrase "first sexual revolution" to refer to the Roaring Twenties. Victorian Era attitudes were somewhat destabilized by World War I and alcohol prohibition in the United States. At the same time the women's suffrage movement obtained voting rights, the subculture of the flapper girl included pre-marital sex and "petting parties".

=== 'Silent' sexual revolution ===
Contrary to popular belief, the common perception that there was far less out-of-wedlock sex in the United States between 1940 and 1960 than in later years was discredited by 2005. U.S. Census Bureau statistics collected by University of Florida history professor Alan Petigny showed that single motherhood among even white women in fact increased from 3.6 to 9.2 newborns per 1,000 unmarried out-of-wedlock pregnancies during this period in time. Single motherhood among all women also rose form 7.1 to 21.6 newborns per 1,000 unwed women from 1940 to 1960 as well. According to Petigny, World War II would in fact mark the start of a "silent" sexual revolution, where higher levels pre-marital took place, but were merely less openly discussed. As Petigny further noted, "Between the beginning of World War II in 1941 and the inaugural issue of Playboy in 1953, the overall rate of single motherhood more than doubled," while noting that this higher level of sexual activity was not publicly disclosed as much, stating "after 15 years of Depression and war, there was also a desire on the part of Americans to live in the moment and enjoy life, and they were accordingly less likely to defer to traditional restraints on their behavior," and that "the silent generation may have been silent about what they were doing, but they weren't all that complacent." A study conducted by the Northwestern University Pritzker School of Law that was published in 1958 also acknowledged the lack of prosecutions for fornication in the United States'

=== Formation ===
Indicators of non-traditional sexual behavior (e.g., gonorrhea incidence, births out of wedlock, and births to adolescents) began to rise dramatically in the mid-to-late 1950s. It brought about profound shifts in attitudes toward women's sexuality, homosexuality, pre-marital sexuality, and the freedom of sexual expression.

Psychologists and scientists such as Wilhelm Reich and Alfred Kinsey influenced the changes. As well, changing mores were both stimulated by and reflected in literature and films, and by the social movements of the period, including the counterculture, the women's movement, and the gay rights movement. The counterculture contributed to the awareness of radical cultural change that was the social matrix of the sexual revolution. Communism had little to do with it.

The sexual revolution was initiated by those who shared a belief in the detrimental impact of sexual repression, a view that had previously been argued by Wilhelm Reich, D. H. Lawrence, Sigmund Freud, and the Surrealist movement.

The counterculture wanted to explore the body and mind, and free the personal self from the moral and legal sexual confines of traditional American values. The sexual revolution sprung from a conviction that the erotic should be celebrated as a normal part of life, dodging religion, family, industrialized moral codes, and the state.

The development of the birth control pill in 1960 gave women access to easy and more reliable contraception. Another likely cause was a vast improvement in obstetrics, greatly reducing the number of women who died due to childbearing, thus increasing the life expectancy of women. A third, more indirect cause was the large number of children born in the 1940s and throughout the 1950s all over the Western world, as the "Baby Boom Generation", many of whom would grow up in relatively prosperous and safe conditions, within a middle class on the rise and with better access to education and entertainment than ever before. By their demographic weight and their social and educational background, they came to trigger a shift in society towards more permissive and informalized attitudes.

The discovery of penicillin led to significant reductions in syphilis mortality, which, in turn, spurred an increase in non-traditional sex during the mid-to-late 1950s.

There was an increase in sexual encounters between unmarried adults. Divorce rates were dramatically increasing and marriage rates were significantly decreasing in this time period. The number of unmarried Americans aged twenty to twenty-four more than doubled from 4.3 million in 1960 to 9.7 million in 1976. Men and women sought to reshape marriage by experimenting with new practices consisting of open marriage, mate swapping, swinging, and communal sex.

== Academic influences ==
=== Freudian school ===
Sigmund Freud of Vienna believed human behavior was motivated by unconscious drives, primarily by the libido or "Sexual Energy". Freud proposed to study how these unconscious drives were repressed and found expression through other cultural outlets. He called this therapy "psychoanalysis".

While Freud's ideas were sometimes ignored or provoked resistance within Viennese society, his ideas soon entered the discussions and working methods of anthropologists, artists and writers all over Europe, and from the 1920s in the United States. His conception of a primary sexual drive that would not be ultimately curbed by law, education or standards of decorum spelled a serious challenge to Victorian prudishness, and his theory of psychosexual development proposed a model for the development of sexual orientations and desires; children emerged from the Oedipus complex, a sexual desire towards their parent of the opposite sex. The idea of children having their parents as their early sexual targets was particularly shocking to Victorian and early 20th century society.

According to Freud's theory, in the earliest stage of a child's psychosexual development, the oral stage, the mother's breast became the formative source of all later erotic sensation. Much of his research remains widely contested by professionals in the field, though it has spurred critical developments in the humanities.

Two anarchist and Marxist proponents of Freud, Otto Gross and Wilhelm Reich (who famously coined the phrase "sexual revolution"), developed a sociology of sex in the 1910s through the 1930s in which the animal-like competitive reproductive behavior was seen as a legacy of ancestral human evolution reflecting in every social relation, as per the Freudian interpretation. Hence, the liberation of sexual behavior was considered by them to be a means to social revolution.

=== Mead's Coming of Age in Samoa ===
The 1928 publication of anthropologist Margaret Mead's Coming of Age in Samoa brought the sexual revolution to the public scene, as her thoughts concerning sexual freedom pervaded academia. Mead's ethnography focused on the psychosexual development of adolescents in Samoa. She recorded that their adolescence was not, in fact, a time of "storm and stress" as Erikson's stages of development suggest, but that the sexual freedom experienced by the adolescents actually permitted them an easy transition from childhood to adulthood.

Mead's findings were later criticized by anthropologist Derek Freeman, who investigated her claims of promiscuity and conducted his own ethnography of Samoan society.

=== Unwin's Sex and Culture ===
Sex and Culture is a 1934 book by English social anthropologist J. D. Unwin concerning the correlation between a society's level of "cultural achievement" and its level of sexual restraint. The book concluded with the theory that as societies develop, they become more sexually liberal, accelerating the social entropy of the society, thereby diminishing its "creative" and "expansive" energy.

According to Unwin, after a nation becomes prosperous, it becomes increasingly liberal concerning sexual morality. It thus loses its cohesion, impetus and purpose, which he claims is irrevocable. Unwin also stated that absolute monogamy required legal equality between men and women.

=== Kinsey and Masters and Johnson ===
In the late 1940s and early 1950s, Alfred C. Kinsey published two surveys of modern sexual behavior. In 1948 Kinsey published the book Sexual Behavior in the Human Male. He followed this five years later with Sexual Behavior in the Human Female. These books began a revolution in social awareness of, and public attention given to, human sexuality.

Kinsey based his findings in both these books on interviews that he and his team of researchers conducted with thousands of Americans, beginning in the 1930s. The interviews were extensive and could last for several hours; they were supplemented by diaries and other documents that the interviewees were willing to have copied, and sometimes films of them engaging in masturbation or sexual intercourse, if they volunteered and it was practical. Kinsey found in the course of these interviews that many sexual behaviors which had previously been seen as marginal or "abnormal" were in fact more common than previously recognized and were part of the normal spectrum of human sexual behavior; for instance, he is the source of the widely quoted statistic that 4% of the male population is primarily homosexual. He advocated using this information to reform sex-related laws, which at the time were often draconian (for example two men having consensual sex in private was considered a crime).

Kinsey's books became bestsellers when published, and laid the groundwork for researchers William H. Masters and Virginia E. Johnson to study the nature and scope of sexual practices among young Americans. Their books, Human Sexual Response and Human Sexual Inadequacy, published in 1966 and 1970 respectively, were also best-sellers, and are now considered classic texts in the field.

== Popular culture ==
=== Erotic novels ===
In the United States in the years 1959 through 1966, bans on three books with explicit erotic content were challenged and overturned. This also occurred in the United Kingdom starting with the 1959 Obscene Publications Act and reaching a peak with the Lady Chatterley's Lover court case.

Prior to this time, a patchwork of regulations (as well as local customs and vigilante actions) governed what could and could not be published. For example, the United States Customs Service banned James Joyce's Ulysses by refusing to allow it to be imported into the United States. The Roman Catholic Church's Index Librorum Prohibitorum carried great weight among Catholics, and any book appearing on it was tantamount to an effective and instant boycott. Boston's Watch and Ward Society, a largely Protestant creation inspired by Anthony Comstock, made "banned in Boston" a national by-word.

In 1959 Grove Press published an unexpurgated version of the 1928 novel Lady Chatterley's Lover by D. H. Lawrence. The U.S. Post Office confiscated copies sent through the mail. Lawyer Charles Rembar sued the New York City Postmaster, and won in New York and then on federal appeal.

Henry Miller's 1934 novel, Tropic of Cancer, had explicit sexual passages and could not be published in the United States; an edition was printed by the Obelisk Press in Paris and copies were smuggled into the United States. In 1961 Grove Press issued a copy of the work, and dozens of booksellers were sued for selling it. The issue was ultimately settled by the U.S. Supreme Court's 1964 decision in Grove Press, Inc. v. Gerstein.

In 1963 Putnam published John Cleland's 1750 novel Fanny Hill. Charles Rembar appealed a restraining order against it all the way to the U.S. Supreme Court and won. In Memoirs v. Massachusetts, 383 U.S. 413, the court ruled that sex was "a great and mysterious motive force in human life", and that its expression in literature was protected by the First Amendment.

By permitting the publication of Fanny Hill, the U.S. Supreme Court set the bar for any ban so high that Rembar himself called the 1966 decision "the end of obscenity". Only books primarily appealing to "prurient interest" could be banned. In a famous phrase, the court said that obscenity is "utterly without redeeming social importance"—meaning that a work with any redeeming social importance or literary merit was arguably not obscene, even if it contained isolated passages that could "deprave and corrupt" some readers.

=== Explicit sex on screen and stage ===
Swedish filmmakers like Ingmar Bergman and Vilgot Sjöman contributed to sexual liberation with sexually themed films that challenged conservative international standards. The 1951 film Hon dansade en sommar (She Danced One Summer AKA One Summer of Happiness) displayed explicit nudity, including bathing in a lake.

This film, as well as Bergman's Sommaren med Monika (The Summer with Monika, 1951) and Tystnaden (The Silence, 1963), caused an international uproar, not least in the United States, where the films were charged with violating standards of decency. Vilgot Sjöman's film I Am Curious (Yellow), also was very popular in the United States. Another of his films, 491, highlighted homosexuality. Kärlekens språk (The Language of Love) was an informative documentary about sex and sexual techniques that featured the first real act of sex in a mainstream film.

From these films, the myth of "Swedish sin" (licentiousness and seductive nudity) arose. The image of "hot love and cold people" emerged, with sexual liberalism seen as part of the modernization process that, by breaking down traditional borders, would lead to the emancipation of natural forces and desires. In Sweden and nearby countries at the time, these films, by virtue of being made by directors who had established themselves as leading names in their generation, helped delegitimize the idea of habitually demanding that films should avoid overtly sexual subject matter. The films eventually progressed the public's attitude toward sex, especially in Sweden and other northern European countries, which today tend to be more sexually liberal than others.

=== Fashion ===
The monokini, also known as a "topless bikini" or "unikini", was designed by Rudi Gernreich in 1964, consisting of only a brief, close-fitting bottom and two thin straps; it was the first women's topless swimsuit. Gernreich's revolutionary and controversial design included a bottom that "extended from the midriff to the upper thigh" and was "held up by shoestring laces that make a halter around the neck." Some credit Gernreich's design with initiating, or describe it as a symbol of, the 1960s sexual revolution.

=== Nonfiction ===
The court decisions that legalized the publication of Fanny Hill had an even more important effect: freed from fears of legal action, nonfiction works about sex and sexuality started to appear more often. These books were factual and in fact, educational, made available in mainstream bookstores and mail-order book clubs to a mainstream readership, and their authors were guests on late-night talk shows. Earlier books such as What Every Girl Should Know (Margaret Sanger, 1920) and A Marriage Manual (Hannah and Abraham Stone, 1939) had broken the silence and, by the 1950s, in the United States, it had become rare for women to go into their wedding nights not knowing what to expect.

The open discussion of sex as pleasure, and descriptions of sexual practices and techniques, was revolutionary. There were practices that some had heard of, but many adults did not know if they were realities or fantasies found only in pornographic books. The Kinsey report revealed that these practices were, at the very least, surprisingly frequent. These other books asserted, in the words of a 1980 book by Irene Kassorla, that Nice Girls Do – And Now You Can Too.

In 1962, Helen Gurley Brown published Sex and the Single Girl: The Unmarried Woman's Guide to Men, Careers, the Apartment, Diet, Fashion, Money and Men.

In 1969 Joan Garrity, identifying herself only as "J.", published The Way to Become the Sensuous Woman, with information on exercises to improve the dexterity of one's tongue and how to have anal sex.

The same year saw the appearance of David Reuben's book Everything You Always Wanted to Know About Sex* (*But Were Afraid to Ask). Despite the dignity of Reuben's medical credentials, this book was light-hearted in tone.

In 1970 the Boston Women's Health Collective published Women and Their Bodies, reissued a year later as Our Bodies, Ourselves). Though not an erotic treatise or sex manual, the book included frank descriptions of sexuality, and contained illustrations that could have caused legal problems just a few years earlier.

Alex Comfort's The Joy of Sex: A Gourmet Guide to Love Making appeared in 1972. In later editions, Comfort's exuberance was tamed in response to AIDS.

In 1975 Will McBride's Zeig Mal! (Show Me!), written with psychologist Helga Fleichhauer-Hardt for children and their parents, appeared in bookstores on both sides of the Atlantic. Appreciated by many parents for its frank depiction of pre-adolescent sexual discovery and exploration, it scandalized others and was pulled from circulation in the United States and some other countries. The book was followed in 1989 by Zeig Mal Mehr! ("Show Me More!").

=== New emergence of pornography ===
The somewhat more open and commercial circulation of pornography was a new phenomenon. Pornography operated as a form of "cultural critique" insofar as it transgresses societal conventions. Manuel Castells claims that the online communities, which emerged (from the 1980s) around early bulletin-board systems, originated from the ranks of those who had been part of the counterculture movements and alternative way of life emerging out of the sexual revolution.

Lynn Hunt points out that early modern "pornography" (18th century) is marked by a "preponderance of female narrators", that the women were portrayed as independent, determined, financially successful (though not always socially successful and recognized) and scornful of the new ideals of female virtue and domesticity, and not objectification of women's bodies as many view pornography today. The sexual revolution was not unprecedented in identifying sex as a site of political potential and social culture. It was suggested that the interchangeability of bodies within pornography had radical implications for the meaning of gender differences, roles and norms.

In 1971 Playboy stopped airbrushing pubic hair out of its centerfold picture spreads; this new addition caused the magazine to hit its all-time peak circulation of more than seven million copies in 1972 and men started having more choices when it came to magazines.

In 1972 Deep Throat became a popular movie for heterosexual couples. The movie played all over America and was the first pornographic movie to earn a gross of a million dollars.

Pornography was less stigmatized by the end of the 1980s, and more mainstream movies depicted sexual intercourse as entertainment. Magazines depicting nudity, such as the popular Playboy and Penthouse magazines, won some acceptance as mainstream journals, in which public figures became more comfortable openly expressing their fantasies.

Some figures in the feminist movement, such as Andrea Dworkin, challenged the depiction of women as objects in these pornographic or "urban men's" magazines. Other feminists such as Betty Dodson went on to found the pro-sex feminist movement in response to anti-pornography campaigns.

In India, an organization named Indians For Sexual Liberties is advocating the legalization of the porn business in India. The organization's founder, Laxman Singh, questioned the reasoning behind deeming as illegal the depiction of legal acts.

=== The Playboy culture ===
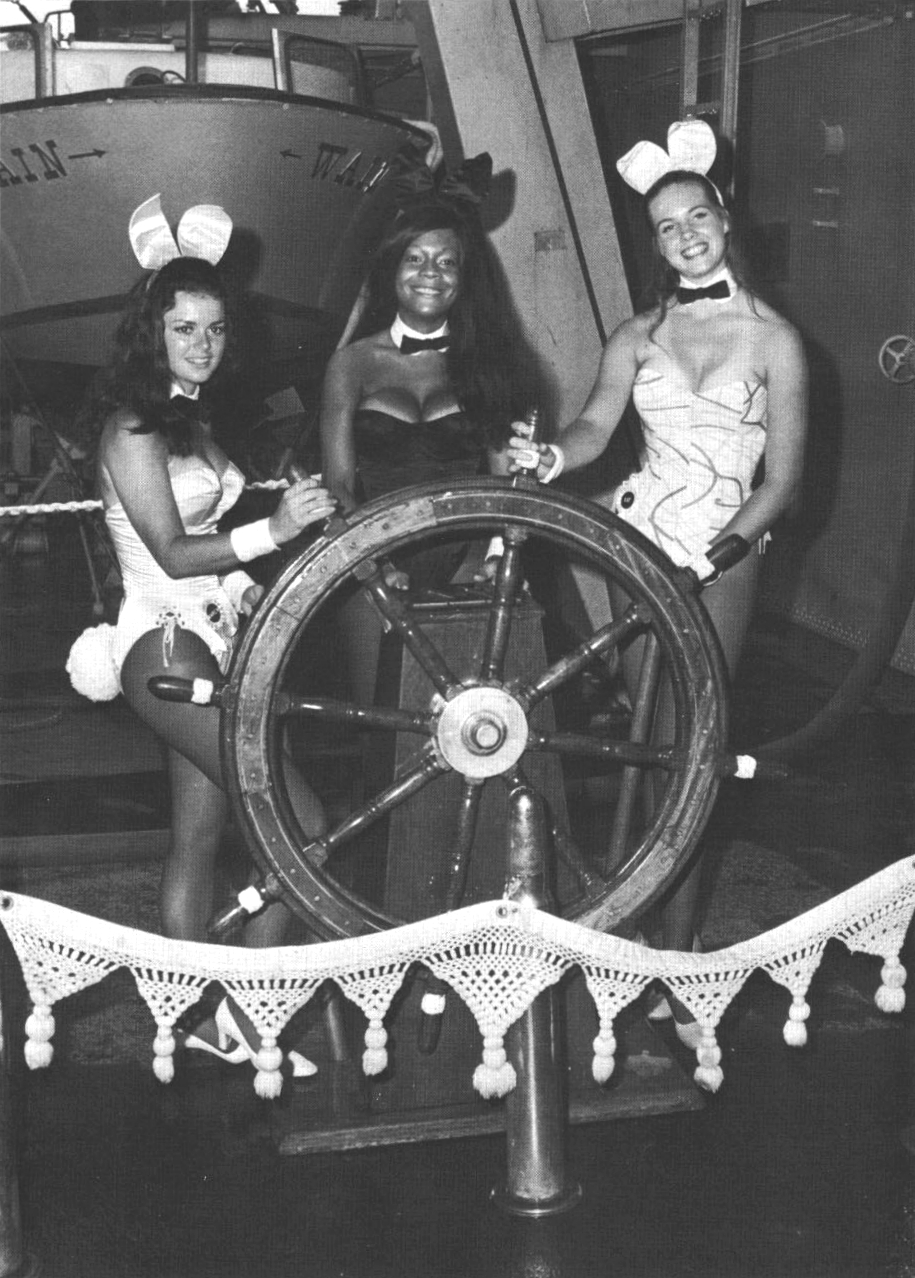
Playboy Bunnies aboard US Navy ship (USS Wainwright (CG-28)), 1971

In 1953, Chicago resident Hugh Hefner founded Playboy, a magazine which aimed to target males between the ages of 21 and 45. The coverpage and nude centerfold in the first edition featured Marilyn Monroe, then a rising sex symbol. Featuring cartoons, interviews, short fiction, Hefner's "Playboy Philosophy" and unclothed female "Playmates" posing provocatively, the magazine became immensely successful.

In 1960, Hefner expanded Playboy Enterprises, opening the first Playboy Club in Chicago, which grew to a chain of nightclubs and resorts. The private clubs offered relaxation for members, who were waited on by Playboy Bunnies.

While Hefner claimed his company contributed to America's more liberal attitude towards sex, others believe he simply exploited it.

=== Pornographic film ===
In 1969, Blue Movie, directed by Andy Warhol, was the first adult erotic film depicting explicit sex to receive wide theatrical release in the United States. The film helped inaugurate the "porno chic" phenomenon in modern American culture. According to Warhol, Blue Movie was a major influence in the making of Last Tango in Paris, starring Marlon Brando, and released a few years after Blue Movie was made.

In 1970, Mona the Virgin Nymph became the second film to gain wide release. The third, Deep Throat, despite being rudimentary by the standards of mainstream filmmaking, achieved major box office success, following mentions by Johnny Carson on The Tonight Show, and Bob Hope on television as well. In 1973, the far-more-accomplished (though still low-budget) The Devil in Miss Jones was well received by major media, including a favorable review by film critic Roger Ebert.

In 1976, The Opening of Misty Beethoven (based on the play Pygmalion by George Bernard Shaw) was released theatrically and is considered by Toni Bentley the "crown jewel" of "the golden age of porn."

By the mid-1970s and through the 1980s, newly won sexual freedoms were being exploited by big businesses looking to capitalize on an increasingly permissive society, with the advent of public and hardcore pornography.

== Modern revolutions ==
The Industrial Revolution during the nineteenth century and the growth of science and technology, medicine and health care, resulted in better contraceptives being manufactured. Advances in the manufacture and production of rubber made possible the design and production of condoms that could be used by hundreds of millions of men and women to prevent pregnancy at little cost. Advances in chemistry, pharmacology, and biology, and human physiology led to the discovery and perfection of the first oral contraceptives, popularly known as "the pill".

All these developments took place alongside and combined with an increase in worldwide literacy rates and a decline in religious observance. Old values such as the Biblical notion of "be fruitful and multiply" were cast aside as people continued to feel alienated from the past and adopted the lifestyles of progressive modernizing cultures.

Another contribution that helped bring about this modern revolution of sexual freedom were the writings of Herbert Marcuse and Wilhelm Reich, who took the philosophy of Karl Marx and similar philosophers.

"No-fault" unilateral divorce became legal and easier to obtain in many countries during the 1960s, 1970s, and 1980s.

The women's movement redefined sexuality, not in terms of simply pleasing men but recognizing women's sexual satisfaction and sexual desire. The Myth of the Vaginal Orgasm (1970) by Anne Koedt illustrates an understanding of a women's sexual anatomy including evidence for the clitoral orgasm, arguing against Freud's "assumptions of women as inferior appendage to man, and her consequent social and psychological role." The women's movement was able to develop lesbian feminism, freedom from heterosexual act, and freedom from reproduction. Feminist Betty Friedan published the Feminine Mystique in 1963, concerning the many frustrations women had with their lives and with separate spheres which established a pattern of inequality.

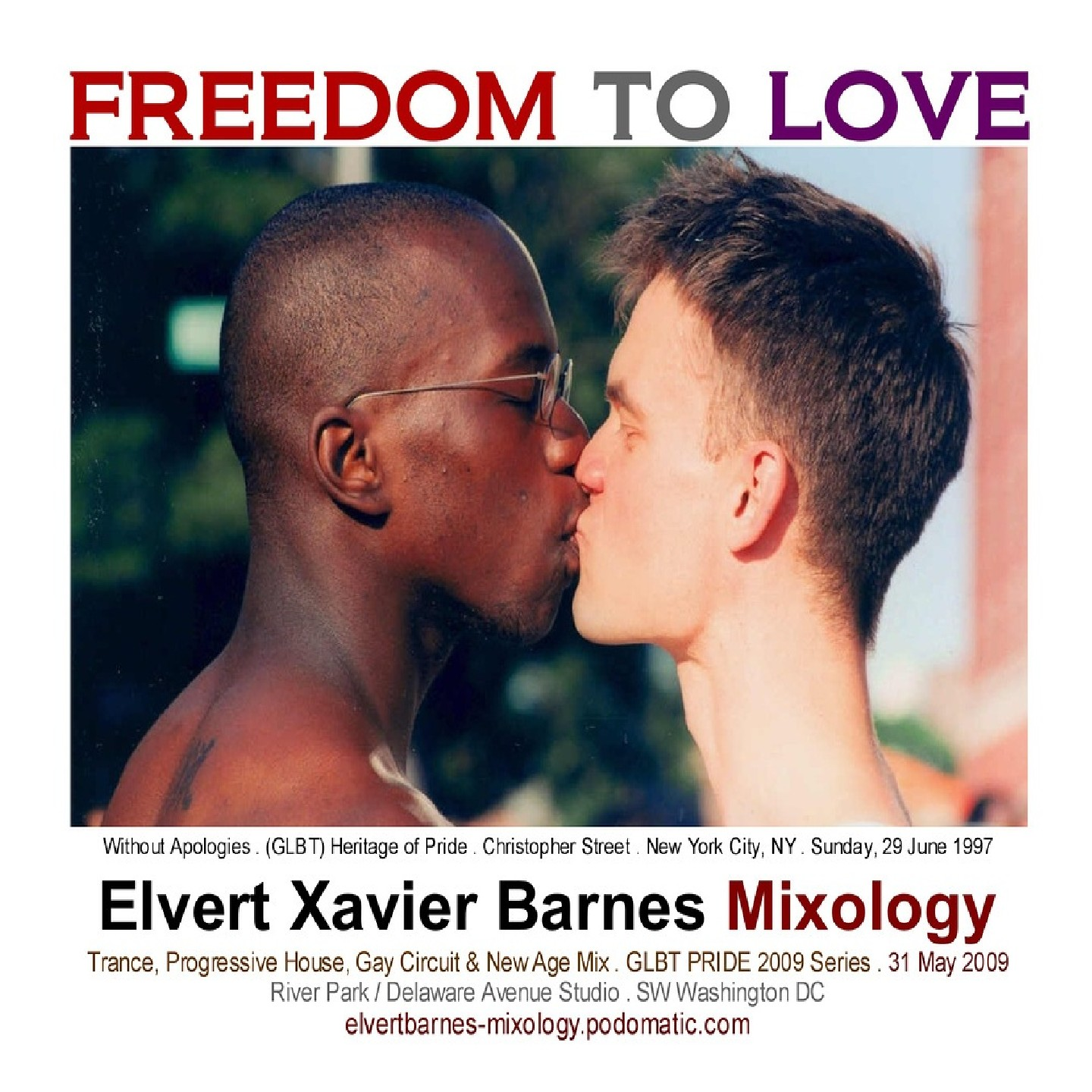
1997 LGBT poster, New York City

The Gay Rights Movement started when the Stonewall riots of 1969 crystallized a broad grass-roots mobilization. New gay liberationist gave political meaning to "coming out" by extending the psychological-personal process into public life. During the 1950s the most feared thing of the homosexual culture was "coming out", the homosexual culture of the 1950s did everything they could to help keep their sexuality a secret from the public and everyone else in their lives, but Alfred Kinsey's research on homosexuality alleged that 39% of the unmarried male population had had at least one homosexual experience to orgasm between adolescence and old age.

== Regional developments ==
Historians stress that rather than being a homogeneous Western phenomenon, the sexual revolution was a transnational process influenced by regional legal customs, religious organizations, Cold War politics, and post-colonial state-building.

=== United States ===
The 1960s counterculture, second-wave feminism, and the gay liberation movement contributed to the acceleration of the sexual revolution in the United States during the 1960s and 1970s. The combined oral contraceptive pill was approved by the Food and Drug Administration in 1960, and landmark decisions from the US Supreme Court, such as Griswold v. Connecticut (1965) and Eisenstadt v. Baird (1972), invalidated state restrictions on contraception for married and unmarried people. While the 1969 Stonewall riots sparked national activism for LGBTQ rights in the United States, obscenity rulings like Memoirs v. Massachusetts (1966) and Miller v. California (1973) changed American publishing and film during the Golden Age of Porn.

=== Western Europe ===
Significant changes in sexual norms occurred in Western Europe between the late 1950s and the 1970s, coinciding with postwar economic prosperity and a decline in church attendance.

- United Kingdom: The broad social changes of the 1960s became widely known as the "permissive society", a shift supported by legislative reforms championed by Home Secretary Roy Jenkins. Important turning points included the National Health Service (Family Planning) Act 1967, the Abortion Act 1967, the Sexual Offences Act 1967, which partially decriminalized consensual homosexual acts in England and Wales, and the Obscene Publications Act 1959, which was tested in the 1960 Lady Chatterley's Lover obscenity trial.
- West Germany and Scandinavia: The 1968 West German student movement, whose activists drew on Wilhelm Reich and Herbert Marcuse to connect sexual repression to authoritarianism and the Nazi past, intersected with the commercial "Sexwelle" ("sex wave") spearheaded by entrepreneurs like Beate Uhse. Denmark became the first nation to outlaw the legal censorship of written and visual pornography in 1967 and 1969, respectively, while Sweden implemented mandatory sex education in schools in 1955.
- France: Building on the Neuwirth Law of 1967, which made oral contraception legal in France, student activists challenged gender segregation at universities and traditional family morality during the May 68 civil unrest.

== Feminism and sexual liberation ==
Since the beginning of the sexual liberation movement in the Western world, which coincided with second-wave feminism and the women's liberation movement initiated in the early 1960s, new religious movements and alternative spiritualities such as Modern Paganism and the New Age began to grow and spread across the globe alongside their intersection with the sexual liberation movement and the counterculture of the 1960s, and exhibited characteristic features, such as the embrace of alternative lifestyles, unconventional dress, rejection of Abrahamic religions and their conservative social mores, use of cannabis and other recreational drugs, relaxed attitude, sarcastic humble or self-imposed poverty, and laissez-faire sexual behavior. The sexual liberation movement was aided by feminist ideologues in their mutual struggle to challenge traditional ideas regarding female sexuality, male sexuality, and queer sexuality. Elimination of undue favorable bias towards men and objectification of women, as well as support for women's right to choose their sexual partners free of outside interference or societal judgment, were three of the main goals associated with sexual liberation from the feminist perspective. Since during the early stages of feminism, women's liberation was often equated with sexual liberation rather than associated with it. Many feminist thinkers believed that assertion of the primacy of sexuality would be a major step towards the ultimate goal of women's liberation, thus women were urged to initiate sexual advances, enjoy sex and experiment with new forms of sexuality.

The feminist movements insisted and focused on the sexual liberation for women, both physical and psychological. The pursuit of sexual pleasure for women was the core ideology, which subsequently was to set the foundation for female independence. Although whether or not sexual freedom should be a feminist issue is currently a much-debated topic, the feminist movement overtly defines itself as the movement for social, political, and economic equality of men and women. Feminist movements are also involved the fight against sexism and since sexism is a highly complex notion, it is difficult to separate the feminist critique toward sexism from its fight against sexual oppression.

The feminist movement has helped create a social climate in which LGBT people and women are increasingly able to be open and free with their sexuality, which enabled a spiritual liberation of sorts with regards to sex. Rather than being forced to hide their sexual desires or feelings, women and LGBT people have gained and continue to gain increased freedom in this area. Consequently, the feminist movement to end sexual oppression has and continues to directly contribute to the sexual liberation movement.

== Contraception ==
As birth control became widely accessible, men and women began to have more choice in the matter of having children than ever before. The 1916 invention of thin, disposable latex condoms for men led to widespread affordable condoms by the 1930s; the demise of the Comstock laws in 1936 set the stage for the promotion of available effective contraceptives such as the diaphragm and cervical cap; the 1960s introduction of the IUD and oral contraceptives for women gave a sense of freedom from barrier contraception. The Catholic Church under Pope Paul VI (1968) published Humanae vitae (Of Human Life), which was a declaration that banned the use of artificial contraception. Churches allowed for the rhythm method, which was a method of regulating fertility that pushed men and women to take advantage of the "natural cycles" of female fertility, during which women were "naturally infertile." The opposition of Churches (e.g. Humanae vitae) led people who felt alienated from or not represented by religion to form parallel movements of secularization and exile from religion. Women gained much greater access to birth control in the Griswold "girls world" decision in 1965.

The 1965 Supreme Court case Griswold v. Connecticut ruled that the prohibition of contraception was unconstitutional on the grounds that it violated peoples' rights to marital privacy. In addition, in the 1960s and 1970s, the birth control movement advocated for the legalization of abortion and large scale education campaigns about contraception by governments. The Griswold v. Connecticut case and subsequent birth control movements created a precedent for later cases granting rights to birth control for unmarried couples (Eisenstadt v. Baird), 1972), rights to abortion for any woman (Roe v. Wade, 1973), and the right to contraception for juveniles (Carey v. Population Services International, 1977). The Griswold case was also influential in and cited as precedent for landmark cases dealing with the right to homosexual relations (Lawrence v. Texas, 2003) and the right to same-sex marriage (Obergefell v. Hodges, 2015).

== Free love ==
Free love is a social movement that accepts all forms of love. The movement's initial goal was to separate the state from sexual matters such as marriage, birth control, and adultery. It stated that such issues were the concern of the people involved, and no one else.

Free love continued in different forms throughout the 1970s and into the early 1980s, but its more assertive manifestations faced increased pushback in the mid-1980s, when the public first became aware of AIDS, a deadly sexually transmitted disease.

== Non-marital sex ==
Premarital sex, heavily stigmatized for some time, became more widely accepted. The increased availability of birth control (and the legalization of abortion in some places) helped reduce the chance that pre-marital sex would result in unwanted children. By the mid-1970s the majority of newly married American couples had experienced sex before marriage.

Central to the change was the development of relationships between unmarried adults, which resulted in earlier sexual experimentation reinforced by a later age of marriage. On average, Americans were gaining sexual experience before entering into monogamous relationships. The increasing divorce rate and the decreasing stigma attached to divorce during this era also contributed to sexual experimentation. By 1971, more than 75% of Americans thought that premarital sex was acceptable, a threefold increase from the 1950s, and the number of unmarried Americans aged twenty to twenty-four more than doubled from 1960 to 1976. Americans were becoming less and less interested in getting married and settling down and as well less interested in monogamous relationships. In 1971, 35% of the country said they thought marriage was obsolete.

The idea of marriage being outdated came from the development of casual sex between Americans. With the development of the birth control pill and the legalization of abortion in 1973, there was little threat of unwanted children out of wedlock. Also, during this time every known sexually transmitted disease was readily treatable.

Swinger clubs were organizing in places ranging from the informal suburban home to disco-sized emporiums that offered a range of sexual possibilities with multiple partners. In New York City in 1977, Larry Levenson opened Plato's Retreat, which eventually shut down in 1985 under regular close scrutiny by public health authorities.

== Legacy ==
Fraenkel (1992) believes that the "sexual revolution", which the West supposedly experienced in the late 1960s, is a misconception/misnomer, and that sex is never actually enjoyed freely as such, being rather observed in all fields of culture: a stance adopted toward human behavior referable to the concept of "repressive desublimation". According to this concept or interpretation (first evolved by Marxist philosopher Herbert Marcuse), the 'sexual revolution' would be an instance of a conservative force masquerading under the guise of liberation – a force sapping energies (here sexual) which would otherwise be available for a true social critique of a given behavior – and thus an impediment to any real political change which might emancipate the individual from "totalitarian democracy". (See also Bread and circuses, False consciousness and Frankfurt School.) Put baldly, the pursuit of "sexual freedom" may be construed as a distraction from the pursuit of actual freedom.

Allyn argues that the sexual optimism of the 1960s waned with the economic crises of the 1970s, the massive commercialization of sex, increasing reports of child exploitation, disillusionment with the counter-culture and the New Left, and a combined left-right backlash against sexual liberation as an ideal. The discovery of herpes escalated anxieties rapidly and set the stage for the nation's panicked response to AIDS.

Among radical feminists, the view soon became widely held that, thus far, the sexual freedoms gained in the sexual revolution of the 1960s, such as the decreasing emphasis on monogamy, had been largely gained by men at women's expense. In Anticlimax: A Feminist Perspective on the Sexual Revolution, Sheila Jeffreys asserted that the sexual revolution on men's terms contributed less to women's freedom than to their continued oppression, an assertion that has both commanded respect and attracted intense criticism. In the late 1970s and early 1980s, feminist sex wars broke out due to disagreements on pornography, on prostitution, and on BDSM, as well as sexuality in general.

Although the rate of teenage sexual activity is hard to record, the prevalence of teenage pregnancy in Western countries such as Canada and the UK has seen a steady decline since the 1990s. For example, in 1991 there were 61.8 children born per 1,000 teenage girls in the United States. By 2013, this number had declined to 26.6 births per 1,000 teenage girls.

Women and men who lived with each other without marriage sought "palimony" equal to the alimony. Teenagers assumed their right to a sexual life with whomever they pleased, and bathers fought to be topless or nude at beaches.

== See also ==
- Birth control movement in the United States
- Combined oral contraceptive pill
- Commodification of nature
- Comprehensive sex education
- Exploitation of women in mass media
- Feminist sex wars
- Gay liberation
- Indecent exposure
- Miscegenation
- Nordic sexual morality debate
- Open marriage
- Pedophile advocacy groups
- Pornographication
- Promiscuity
- Public display of affection
- Public sex
- Radical and Liberal feminism
- Reproductive rights
- Second-wave feminism
- Sex in the American Civil War
- Sex magic
- Sex-positive feminism
- Sex-positive movement
- Sexual objectification
- Sexual revolution in 1960s United States
- Sexualization
- Social Darwinism
- Spring break
- Underwear as outerwear
