= Anne Mandall Johnson =

British epidemiologist

Dame Anne Johnson DBE FMedSci
- Born: Anne Mandall Johnson; 30 January 1954 (age 72); Newcastle-upon-Tyne, England, UK
- Education: University of Newcastle upon Tyne, University of Cambridge, London School of Hygiene and Tropical Medicine
- Awards: Dame Commander of the Order of the British Empire (2013); Fellow of the Academy of Medical Sciences (2001); Fellow of the Royal College of Physicians
- Scientific career
- Workplaces: University College London, Academy of Medical Sciences
- Website: iris.ucl.ac.uk/iris/browse/profile?upi=AMJOH29

Dame Anne Mandall Johnson (born 30 January 1954) is a British epidemiologist, known for her work in public health, especially the areas of HIV, sexually transmitted infections and infectious diseases.

== Education ==
Johnson's family were involved in medicine. She chose to study at the University of Cambridge and received a Bachelor of Arts (BA) in Medical Sciences, Tripos Part I in 1974, intercalating a year studying social and political sciences during this degree. After graduating, uncertain whether to continue with medicine, she took a gap year in South America that gave her direction for her career. She spent most of her time in Caracas, Venezuela but also with Yanomami people who lived along the Orinoco river. This made her understand the importance to people's health of their environment and socioeconomic status. In 1978, she completed her clinical training at the University of Newcastle upon Tyne and received her Bachelor of Medicine/Bachelor of Surgery (MBBS) in Clinical Medicine. In 1979, she received a Master of Arts from the University of Cambridge.

Her initial post as a GP was in a deprived community in Newcastle-upon-Tyne. To support her increasing interest in the broader determinants of people's health, especially preventive measures to avoid the need for clinical treatments, she then undertook specialist training in epidemiology, earning a Master of Science (MSc) in Public Health and Epidemiology from the London School of Hygiene and Tropical Medicine in 1984. This subject, essential to public health, had not been included in her medical training. It led her into the area of public and economic policy and politics later in her career.

== Career ==
Johnson is Professor of Infectious Disease Epidemiology and Chair of the Grand Challenge for Global Health at University College London. She was formerly Director of the University's Division of Population Health. She was Chair of the Medical Research Council Population Health Sciences Group until 2010. She is a National Institute for Health and Care Research (NIHR) Senior Investigator.

In her clinical research career she has focused on epidemiology and prevention of HIV and sexually transmitted infections. This was initiated in the mid 1980s through a chance opportunity to take a research post at Middlesex Hospital into the early epidemiology of HIV at a time when the topic attracted considerable stigma and sexual health was a new concept. One of her first epidemiological studies was into whether HIV could be transmitted between heterosexual couples. Johnson was also involved in the design of the first purpose-built ward for patients with AIDS that was opened in 1987 by Diana, Princess of Wales. Her work includes sexual lifestyle studies, international HIV cohort studies, and behavioural intervention studies. She has led randomised control trials of behavioural interventions to promote sexual health. Aside from HIV/AIDS research, she also researches epidemiological and immunological determinants of seasonal and pandemic influenza transmission.

She was principal investigator in the National Survey of Sexual Attitudes and Lifestyles (NATSAL), which has run in 1990, 2000, and 2010. Along with several colleagues including Kaye Wellings, Johnson initiated this large sample survey despite some scepticism and opposition. Her work on the national survey of sexual attitudes and lifestyles not only maps the extent of the HIV epidemic but also tracks changes in behaviour over time in the whole UK population. It was financed by the Wellcome Trust charity when government funding was refused at prime ministerial level.

The NATSAL-III study had a broader emphasis on sexuality in the context of health and well-being, and tracked four other sexually transmitted infections: chlamydia, gonorrhea, HPV, and Mycobacterium genitalium in addition to HIV. As well as within public health, information from the surveys has informed government policy in areas such as contraception, age of consent and HPV vaccination.

In 2006, Johnson, along with Andrew Hayward, was one of the founders of Flu Watch, designed to understand effects and transmission of influenza in the general community, rather than only among hospital patients. Participant households were invited to join after being selected at random from the lists of volunteer general practitioners around England. The study also collected blood samples to study immunology related to influenza.

In July 2020, Johnson and other public health scientists affiliated with the Academy of Medical Sciences co-authored a report Preparing for a Challenging Winter 2020/2021 commissioned by the UK Government Office for Science. This indicated that the UK was not well prepared for a second wave of COVID-19 and proposed what should be done.

She was one of the presenters to the House of Lords Select Committee on Intergovernmental Organisations. In November 2010, she was appointed to the Board of Governors of the Wellcome Trust. In 2017 she was elected vice president international of the Academy of Medical Sciences and in December 2020 was elected President of the Academy of Medical Sciences.

== Awards and honors ==
Among other awards, she was appointed, in 2013, a Dame Commander of the Order of the British Empire, as a result of which she is properly styled "Professor Dame Anne Johnson, DBE".

- DBE: Dame Commander of the Order of the British Empire, as of the 2013 Queen's Birthday Honours List
- FMedSci: Fellow of the Academy of Medical Sciences elected in 2001
- FRCP: Fellow of the Royal College of Physicians
- FFPH: Fellow of the Faculty of Public Health
- FRCGP: Fellow of the Royal College of General Practitioners
- Member, National Academy of Medicine
- 2025 honorary degree from the University of Strathclyde
