= Emotional promiscuity =

Emotional promiscuity has been addressed in both the popular press as well as in scientific literature.

== Popular Press ==
In the popular press, there was a book published in 2007 entitled, Avoid the Heartbreak of Emotional Promiscuity, written by Brienne Murk. In her book, Murk argues that (a) guarding one's heart is required for staying pure, (b) emotions cannot be trusted, and (c) that young people must set physical and emotional boundaries. Murk also makes an effort to dissuade young people from participating in activities she views immoral and having extramarital sex. The assertions in the book are based on the author's religious interpretations and are written from a Christian point of view.

== Scientific Literature ==
In scientific literature, Jones (2011) examined the concept of Emotional Promiscuity as a personality/individual difference construct Jones defines emotional promiscuity as the predisposition to fall in love easily, fast, and often. Such individuals tend to love the feeling of falling in love, and want to be with many romantic partners.

Emotional promiscuity can be assessed through self-report using the Emotional Promiscuity Scale (or EP Scale; and is distinct from both sexual promiscuity and anxious attachment

In addition, emotional promiscuity poses a health risk when combined with sexual promiscuity.

In particular individuals who fall in love frequently and easily, and who are also comfortable with casual sex, have many unprotected sexual partners. The authors argue this finding results from premature trust which eventuates into the faulty perception that protection is unnecessary.
