= Shakila Thangaratinam =

British physician

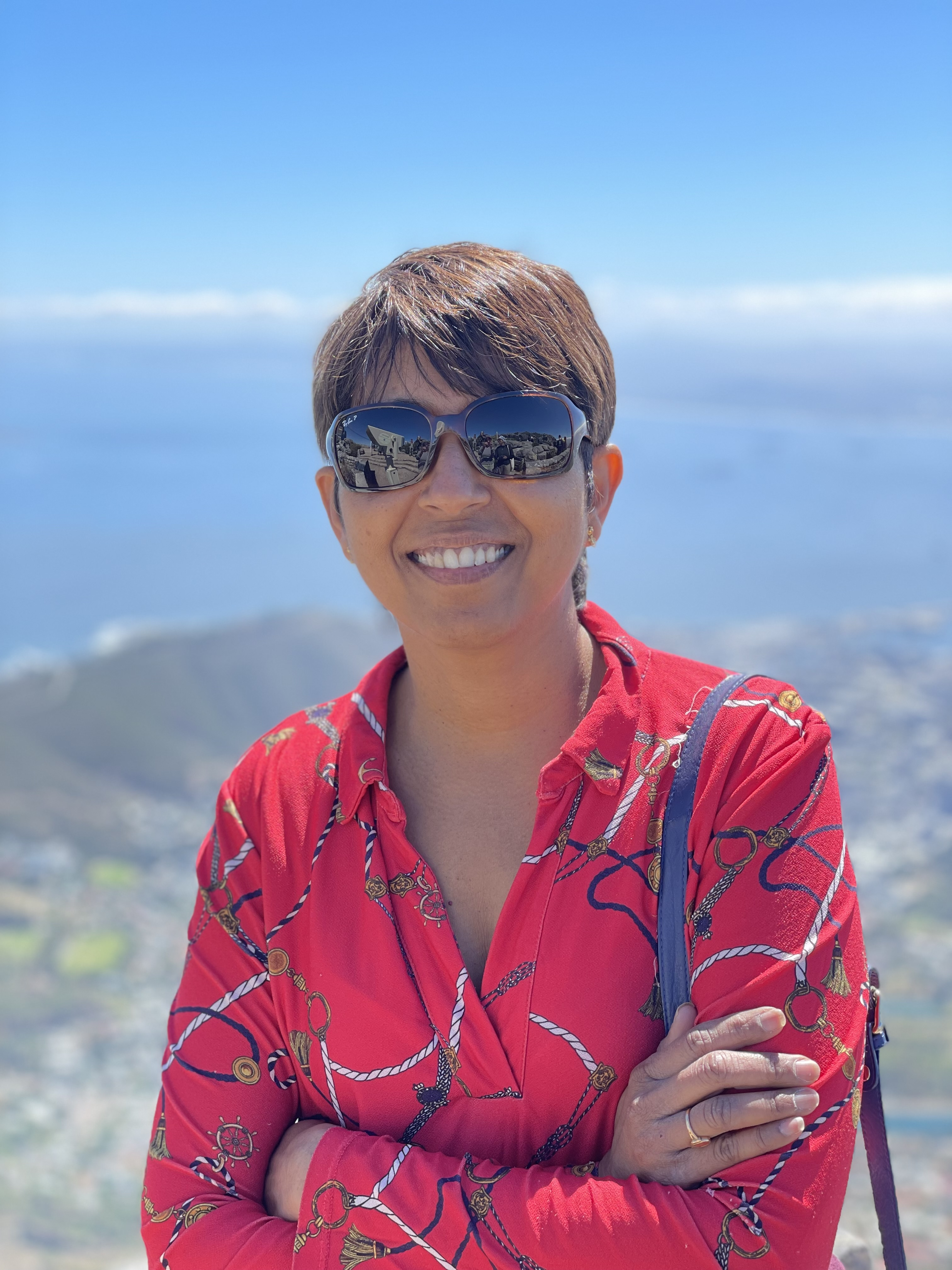
- Education: University of Birmingham
- Scientific career
- Workplaces: University of Liverpool; University of Birmingham; Queen Mary University of London
- Thesis: Health technology assessment in maternal and perinatal medicine : delphi survey of practice, systematic reviews of evidence and meta analyses (2011)

Shakila Thangaratinam is a British physician who is Professor of Women's Health at the University of Liverpool and a consultant obstetrician at Liverpool Women's University Hospital. She is executive dean of the Institute of Life Course and Medical Sciences, at the University of Liverpool. She is the vice president (International) of the Academy of Medical Sciences in the UK. She is an NIHR senior investigator. Her research has shaped global guidelines on COVID-19 in gestational diabetes, pre-eclampsia, pulse oximetry and epilepsy.

== Early life and education ==
Thangaratinam completed her PhD at the University of Birmingham. She trained there as a clinical lecturer in women's health. She obtained her MRCOG from the Royal College of Obstetricians and Gynaecologists in 2003, and completed her clinical training in 2011.

== Research and career ==
Thangaratinam was appointed as a senior lecturer at Queen Mary University of London in 2011 and as Professor of maternal and perinatal health in 2012. She founded the Barts Research Centre for Women's Health and led the women's health theme. In 2020, she joined the College of Medicine and Dental Sciences at University of Birmingham. At Birmingham, she led the women's metabolic health theme of the National Institute for Health and Care Research Biomedical Research Centre and maternity theme of the NIHR Patient Safety Research Centre. Throughout the pandemic, Thangaratinam investigated the relationship between COVID-19 and women's health working with teams at the World Health Organization and the US Centre for Disease Control.

Thangaratinam shaped research into women's health at the National Health Service in her roles as director of research and development for women's health at Barts Health NHS Trust in 2012 and Birmingham Women's Hospital in 2022. In these roles she worked to better integrate academia and clinical practise and minimise health disparities faced by women. She moved to University of Liverpool in 2024, where she was appointed Dean of the Institute of Life Course and Medical Sciences in 2025.

Thangaratinam is committed to the training of the next generation of physicians, nurses and midwives. She created the Dame Hilda Lloyd Network in the West Midlands and the Katherine Twining Network in East London to mentor medical researchers and students. She is also interested in partnerships across the National Health Service, academia, industry and patients, and has championed patient and public involvement with research. She was named a National Institute for Health and Care Research Senior Investigator in 2025.

Thangaratinam was elected Fellow of the Academy of Medical Sciences in 2024 and Vice President in 2025. After Donald Trump warned that taking tylenol during pregnancy was "associated with a very increased risk of autism", Thangaratinam studied the link between acetaminophen and autism. She found that the majority of studies showing a link between the condition and the medication had critical flaws, including inaccurate study designs and no mechanism to eliminate bias. In 2025 she was awarded the Royal College of Obstetricians and Gynaecologists Eardley Holland Medal.

== Selected publications ==
- Thangaratinam, S; Rogozinska, E; Jolly, K; et al. (2012). "Effects of interventions in pregnancy on maternal weight and obstetric outcomes: meta-analysis of randomised evidence". The BMJ. 344 (may16 4) e2088. doi:10.1136/bmj.e2088. PMC 3355191. PMID 22596383. Wikidata Q22242080.
- Shakila Thangaratinam; Alex Tan; Knox, Ellen; Mark D Kilby; Jayne Franklyn; Arri Coomarasamy (2011). "Association between thyroid autoantibodies and miscarriage and preterm birth: meta-analysis of evidence". The BMJ. 342 d2616. doi:10.1136/bmj.d2616. PMC 3089879. PMID 21558126. Wikidata Q33894345.
- Shakila Thangaratinam; Brown, Katherine; Zamora, Javier; Khalid S Khan; Ewer, Andrew (2012). "Pulse oximetry screening for critical congenital heart defects in asymptomatic newborn babies: a systematic review and meta-analysis". The Lancet. 379 (9835): 2459–2464. doi:10.1016/s0140-6736(12)60107-x. PMID 22554860. Wikidata Q34255202.
