= Academy of Medical Sciences (United Kingdom) =

British academic society

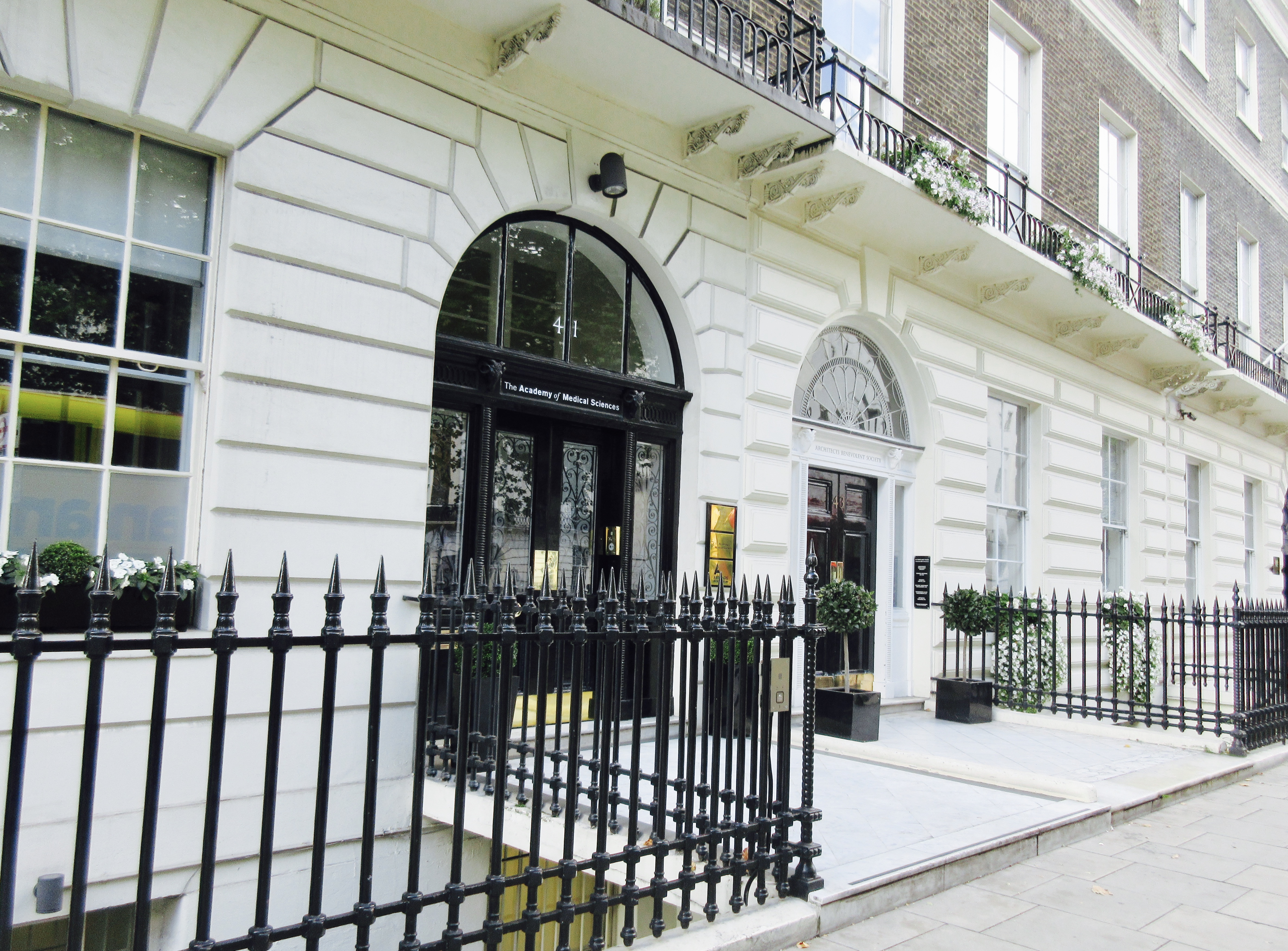
- The front door of the academy
- Founded: 1 November 1998; 28 years ago
- Type: Charitable organisation, National academy
- Registration no.: England and Wales: 1070618
- Purpose: Medical research, Health policy
- Headquarters: Portland Place, London
- Region served: United Kingdom
- Members: 1,416 Ordinary Fellows; 53 Honorary Fellows; (2023)
- President: Professor Andrew Morris
- Website: www.acmedsci.ac.uk

The Academy of Medical Sciences is an organisation established in the UK in 1998. It is one of the four UK National Academies, the others being the British Academy, the Royal Academy of Engineering and the Royal Society.

Its mission is to advance biomedical and health research and its translation into benefits for society. The academy consists of a group of around 1,400 Fellows elected from fields across the biomedical sciences. The academy seeks ultimately to advance medical science and improve health by investing in talented researchers, engaging people on health-related issues and providing expert impartial advice. As of April 2024 its president is Professor Andrew Morris, with Vice-President (International) Shakila Thangaratinam taking up her role in December 2025.

== History ==
The academy was established in 1998 following the recommendations of a working group chaired by Michael Atiyah, former president of the Royal Society. A single national organisation was formed to support biomedical scientists and clinical academics working together to promote advances in medical science. It is one of the four learned academies in the United Kingdom, alongside the Royal Society, Royal Academy of Engineering and British Academy. The intention of the founders was to create a national resource outside the framework of Government, with the expertise and authority to deal with scientific and societal aspects of public policy issues in healthcare.

The formation of the academy occurred against a backdrop of increasing fragmentation and specialisation within the medical profession. The academy merged with the Novartis Foundation in 2008, and moved to a dedicated headquarters building at 41 Portland Place in October 2010. This building provides office space for its staff members, and has rooms for events and conferences.

== Activities ==
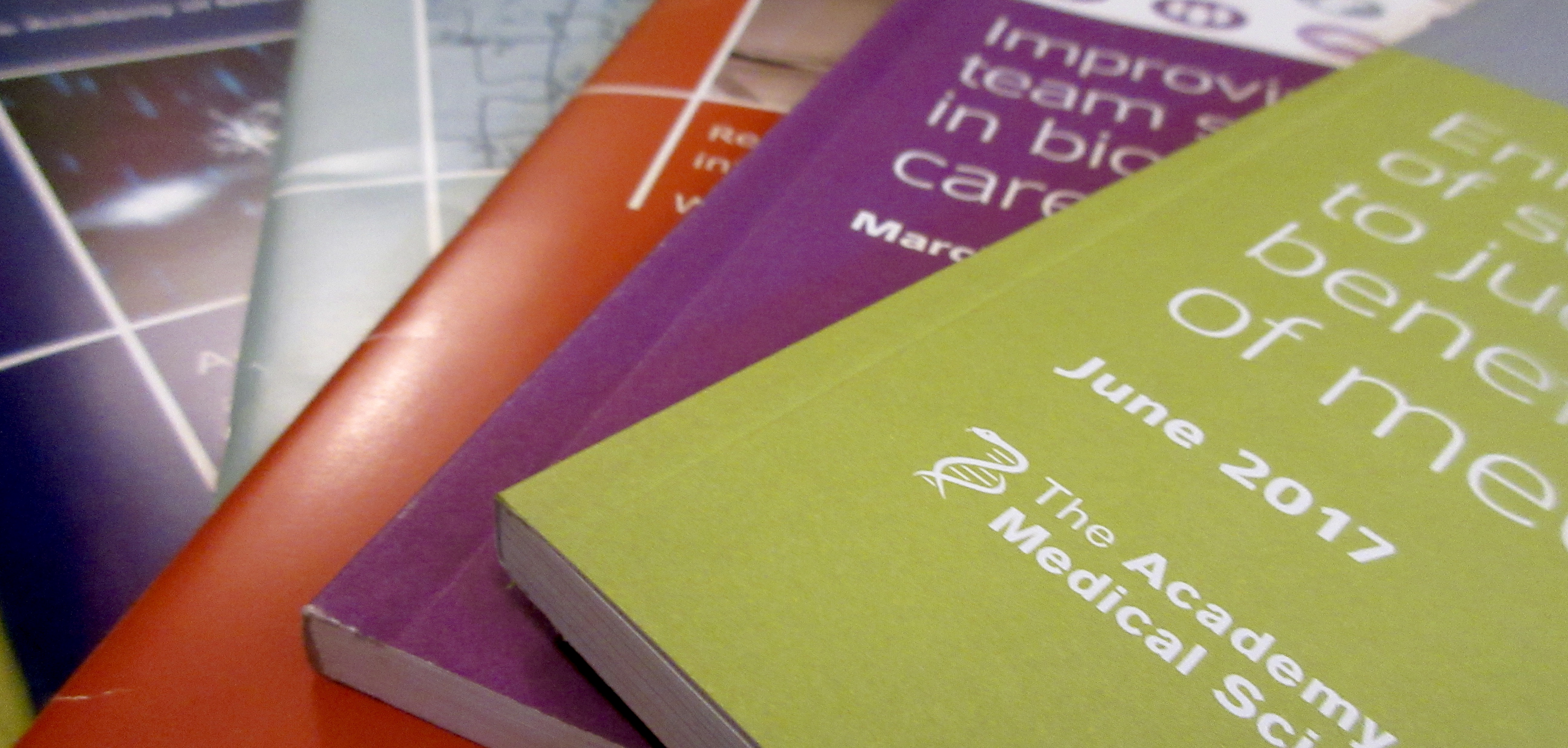
Published policy report front covers, Academy of Medical Sciences

=== Policy ===
Areas of policy work originate from within the Academy Council and wider Fellowship, and in response to consultations from the government, Parliament and other relevant bodies. As of 2017 work included reports on improving public health by 2040, using animals in research, diabetes and obesity, the use of data in medical research and the use of non-human primates in research.

=== Careers ===
The academy's National Mentoring and Outreach Scheme was established in 2002 and is supported by the UK Department of Health, the National Institute for Health and Care Research (NIHR) and NHS Education for Scotland. The programme provides one-to-one mentoring by Academy Fellows for Clinical Lecturers and Clinician Scientist Fellows. It also offers activities for Academic Clinical Fellows, Clinical Training Fellows and MB PhD students.

=== Grants ===
The academy's funding schemes focus on areas of specific and specialist need, addressing perceived shortages within key speciality areas, and international collaboration. Schemes include Clinician Scientist Fellowships, Starter Grants for Clinical Lecturers and UK/Middle East Exchange Fellowships.

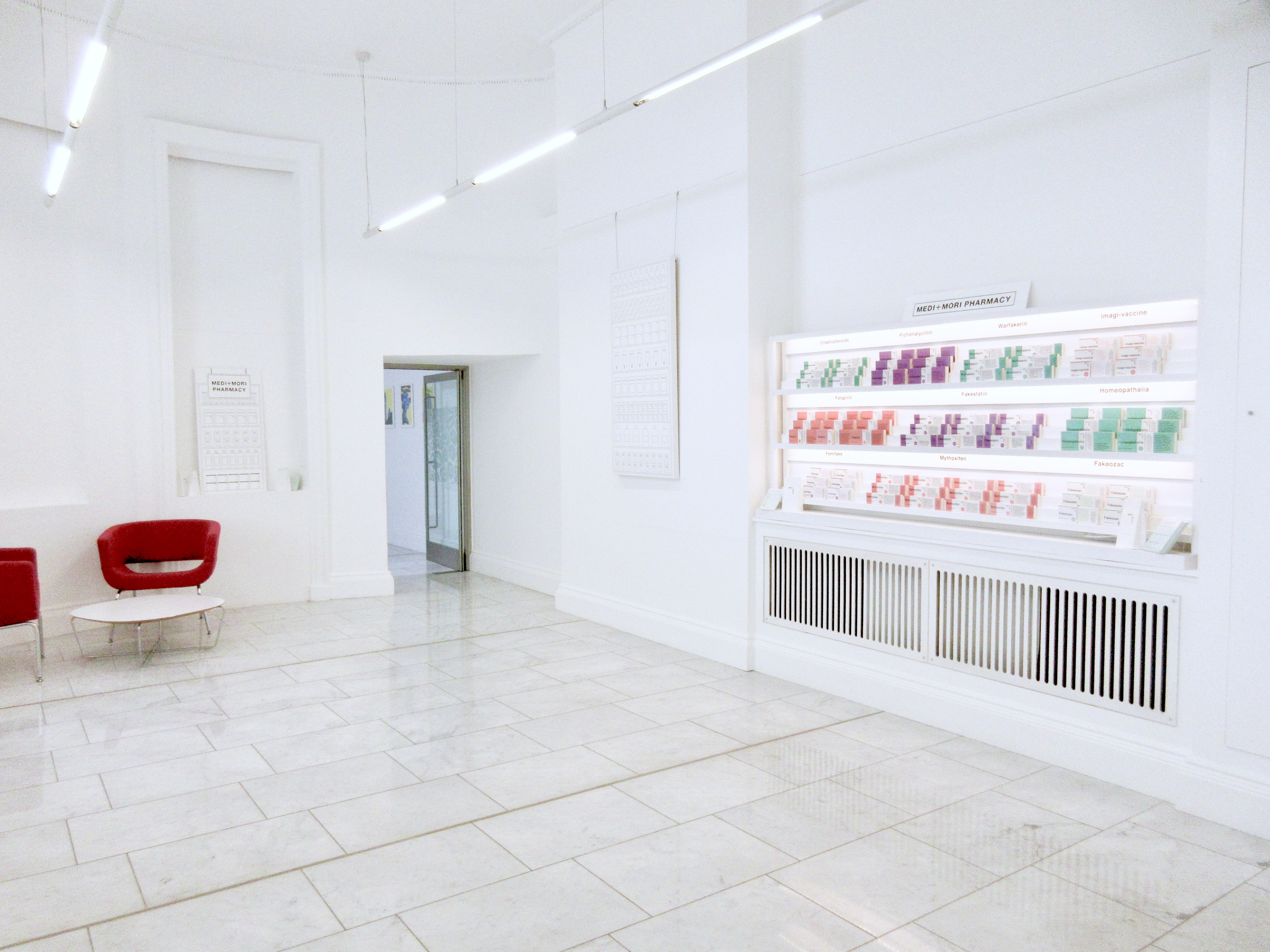
Medi+Mori exhibition, Academy of Medical Sciences

=== Public engagement and dialogue ===
The academy's public events demonstrate recent research and provide a platform for discussion of the latest science.

=== Linking academia and industry ===
The academy's FORUM brings together biomedical scientists from academia and industry. As well as hosting its own conferences and events, the academy has made its headquarters at 41 Portland Place available on a private hire basis for industry and commercial events and conferences.

== Fellowship ==
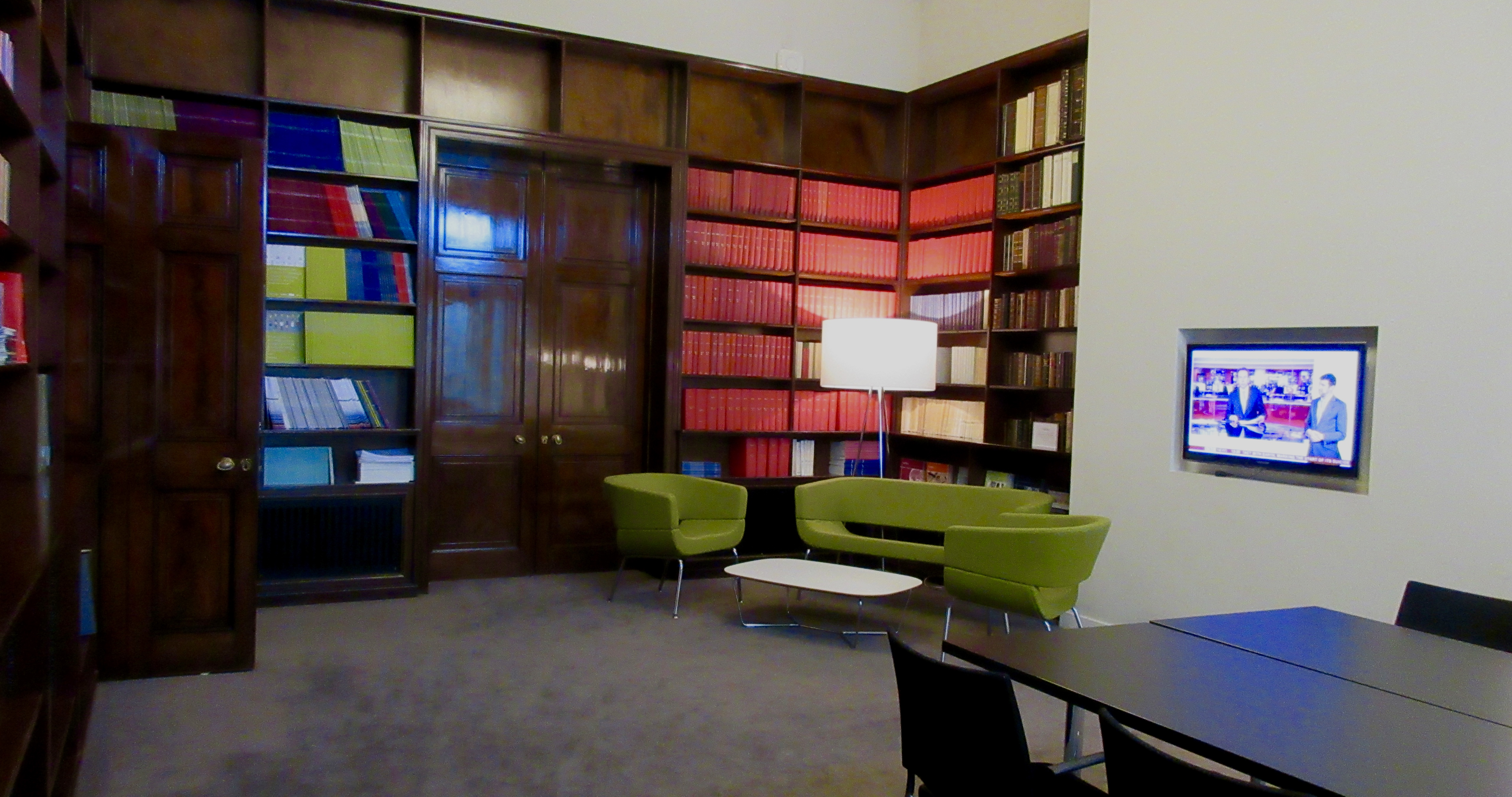
Fellows Common Room, Academy of Medical Sciences

As of April 2024, the academy has 1,416 Ordinary Fellows drawn from fundamental biological sciences, clinical academic medicine, public and population health, health technology implementation, veterinary science, dentistry, medical and nursing care and other professions allied to medical science as well as the basic fundamental mathematics, chemistry, physics, engineering, ethics, social science and the law. The Fellowship represents a national resource in medical science, offering their time and expertise to support the academy's work.

Up to 48 new Fellows are elected to the academy each year. Eight Sectional Committees spanning the range of medical sciences scrutinise candidates and make recommendations to Council for election. Becoming a Fellow indicates that the academy judges individuals to have made "outstanding contributions...to the progress of medical science and the development of better healthcare". Election is often described as "prestigious".

Past and present honorary fellows include:

- Chen Zhu Minister of Health, Ministry of Health, China;
- Sydney Brenner, Distinguished Professor, Salk Institute;
- François Gros, Permanent Secretary of ‘Académie des Sciences’, Institut de France;
- William Castell LVO FCA, President & CEO, GE Healthcare;
- Professor Françoise Barré-Sinoussi Director, Unité de Régulation des Infections Rétrovirales, Institut Pasteur and Nobel Laureate;
- Sir Andrew Witty Chief Executive Officer, GSK.

Some of its members are retired and are no longer active in research.

== List of presidents ==
- 1998–2002 Peter Lachmann (University of Cambridge)
- 2002–2006 Keith Peters (University of Cambridge)
- 2006–2011 John Irving Bell (University of Oxford)
- 2011–2015 John Tooke (University College London)
- 2015–2020 Sir Robert Lechler (King's College London)
- 2020–2024 Dame Anne Johnson (University College London)
- 2024–present Andrew Morris (University of Edinburgh)

== Honours ==
The academy presents numerous awards and lectures and medals to recognise significant achievements within the field of medical science.

== See also ==
- Fellow of the Academy of Medical Sciences
- Category:Fellows of the Academy of Medical Sciences (United Kingdom)
- Royal Society
- UK Young Academy
