= National Survey of Sexual Attitudes and Lifestyles =

Survey in the United Kingdom

The National Survey of Sexual Attitudes and Lifestyles (Natsal) is a series of surveys of people in the Great Britain regarding their sexual behaviour and patterns, and are among the largest scientific studies of sexual behaviours in the world. The rounds of surveys completed to date are Natsal-1 (1990–1991) and Natsal-2 (2000–2001) and Natsal-3 (2010–2012), as well as Natsal-COVID (2020–2021). Data collection for Natsal-4 is taking place from September 2022 to December 2023. Natsal-4's Principal Co-investigators are Pam Sonnenberg and Cath Mercer, both professors at University College, London.

Natsal's findings are widely used in research and policy making, and have influenced public health policy in areas such as: The National Sexual Health & HIV Strategy in England; the Scottish Sexual Health Strategy (2005-) and the Welsh Sexual Health Strategy, The Teenage Pregnancy Strategy (2000–2010), the National Chlamydia Screening Programme (NCSP), the national human papillomavirus (HPV) immunisation programme in 2008/9, the statutory provision of personal, social, health and economic education (PHSE) education in schools in 2009, Sexual health campaigns such as "Sex: worth talking about" in 2010, and the National Institute for Health and Clinical Excellence (NICE) guidelines on long acting contraception (2006).

== History ==
The first Natsal survey was carried out in 1990, in response to the urgent need of understanding sexual practices in the context of the HIV/AIDS epidemic. The Principal Investigator of Natsal-1, Natsal-2 and Natsal-3 was Anne Johnson, a professor at University College, London, and co-leader Kaye Wellings, a professor at the London School of Hygiene & Tropical Medicine.

The Natsal-3 survey revealed, among other things, that British people are having sex less often than they did 20 years ago, but that same-sex experiences between women were growing more numerous.

== Key publications ==
- Mercer, Catherine H.; Clifton, Soazig; Riddell, Julie; Tanton, Clare; Freeman, Lily; Copas, Andrew J.; Dema, Emily; Pérez, Raquel Bosó; Gibbs, Jo; Macdowall, Wendy; Menezes, Dee; Ridge, Mary-Clare; Bonell, Chris; Sonnenberg, Pam; Field, Nigel (2022-11-01). "Impacts of COVID-19 on sexual behaviour in Britain: findings from a large, quasi-representative survey (Natsal-COVID)". Sexually Transmitted Infections. 98 (7): 469–477. doi:10.1136/sextrans-2021-055210. ISSN 1368-4973. PMC 8687784. PMID 34916335.
- Johnson, Anne M; Mercer, Catherine H; Erens, Bob; Copas, Andrew J; McManus, Sally; Wellings, Kaye; Fenton, Kevin A; Korovessis, Christos; Macdowall, Wendy (2001). "Sexual behaviour in Britain: partnerships, practices, and HIV risk behaviours". The Lancet. 358 (9296): 1835–1842. doi:10.1016/s0140-6736(01)06883-0. PMID 11741621. S2CID 37954044.
- Mercer, Catherine H; Tanton, Clare; Prah, Philip; Erens, Bob; Sonnenberg, Pam; Clifton, Soazig; Macdowall, Wendy; Lewis, Ruth; Field, Nigel (2013). "Changes in sexual attitudes and lifestyles in Britain through the life course and over time: findings from the National Surveys of Sexual Attitudes and Lifestyles (Natsal)". The Lancet. 382 (9907): 1781–1794. doi:10.1016/s0140-6736(13)62035-8. PMC 3899021. PMID 24286784.
- Wellings, Kaye; Nanchahal, Kiran; Macdowall, Wendy; McManus, Sally; Erens, Bob; Mercer, Catherine H; Johnson, Anne M; Copas, Andrew J; Korovessis, Christos; Fenton, Kevin A; Field, Julia (December 2001). "Sexual behaviour in Britain: early heterosexual experience". The Lancet. 358 (9296): 1843–1850. doi:10.1016/S0140-6736(01)06885-4. PMID 11741623. S2CID 35905955.
- Fenton, Kevin A; Korovessis, Christos; Johnson, Anne M; McCadden, Angela; McManus, Sally; Wellings, Kaye; Mercer, Catherine H; Carder, Caroline; Copas, Andrew J; Nanchahal, Kiran; Macdowall, Wendy; Ridgway, Geoff; Field, Julia; Erens, Bob (December 2001). "Sexual behaviour in Britain: reported sexually transmitted infections and prevalent genital Chlamydia trachomatis infection". The Lancet. 358 (9296): 1851–1854. doi:10.1016/S0140-6736(01)06886-6. PMID 11741624. S2CID 26108172.
