= Charles Rembar =

American lawyer (1915–2000)

- Born: March 12, 1915; Oceanport, New Jersey, U.S.
- Died: October 24, 2000 (aged 85); New York City, U.S.
- Occupations: lawyer, historian
- Known for: First Amendment cases in the US Supreme Court
- Notable work: The End of Obscenity: The Trials of Lady Chatterley, Tropic of Cancer and Fanny Hill (1968), The Law of the Land: The Evolution of Our Legal System (1980)

Charles Rembar (March 12, 1915 – October 24, 2000) was an American attorney best known as a First Amendment rights lawyer.

== Early life and career ==
Rembar was born in Oceanport, New Jersey, and grew up in Long Branch, New Jersey. He graduated from Harvard University with a bachelor's degree in 1935 and received his law degree from Columbia Law School in 1938. He worked for several New Deal agencies after graduating from law school and then served in the United States Army Air Corps during World War II, after which he moved back to the New York area, living in Scarsdale and working in Manhattan.

Rembar founded the law firm of Rembar & Curtis, which represented writers such as Louise Erdrich, Tom Clancy, Herman Wouk, and Norman Mailer, both as lawyers and often as literary agents.

== First Amendment cases ==
In 1959, Grove Press published an unexpurgated version of Lady Chatterley's Lover by D. H. Lawrence. The U.S. Post Office confiscated copies sent through the mail. Rembar, working for Grove Press, sued the New York city postmaster and won in New York and then on federal appeal. Subsequently, he defended Henry Miller's Tropic of Cancer and John Cleland's Fanny Hill – the latter argued before the U.S. Supreme Court – which played a major role in changing the nation's approach to obscenity.

== Books ==
In 1968, he published a book documenting the trials called The End of Obscenity: The Trials of Lady Chatterley, Tropic of Cancer and Fanny Hill, which won a George Polk Award in journalism. In 1975, he published a collection of wide-ranging essays titled Perspective. In 1980 he wrote The Law of the Land: The Evolution of Our Legal System, a general history of the evolution of Anglo-American law, written for the non-lawyer and non-historian.

== Death ==
He died in the Bronx, New York City, on October 24, 2000.
