= Kaye Wellings =

Co-founder of NATSAL

Kathleen Anne Wellings OBE is an active Sexual and Reproductive Health educator and has worked within this field of study for over 20 years. She has a strong interest in evaluation research, particularly in relation to preventive intervention and has assessed major national and international sexual health programmes, including AIDS preventive strategies in European countries and the English government's Teenage Pregnancy Strategy. Much of her working life has been spent researching sensitive topics, including not only sexual behaviour but also risk practices relating to drug use and in prison populations and the taboo of birth contraceptives in her early years.

== Early and current career ==
After graduation, Wellings moved to London as a public health and social scientist. For some time, Wellings worked in journalism with the journal New Society until continuing on to work with the Family Planning Association in health policy research. The next few years brought on the continuing HIV/AIDS epidemic in which Wellings monitored responses amongst the public as Senior Research Officer at the Health Education Authority (HEA). There was some conflict with methods used to handle and distribute research to the media, where Wellings and other researchers had one idea of presentation while politicians had another. “My experience there made me seek a safe haven in academia, where I could tell the story as it was, without having to suppress data or manipulate angles”, states Wellings.

Currently, Wellings is a professor of Sexual and Reproductive Health Research at the London School of Hygiene and Tropical Medicine (LSHTM). She co-led of the first three British National Surveys of Sexual Attitudes and Lifestyles.

Wellings has co-written several research papers describing trends and current patterns in sexual practices with opposite-sex partners among men and women aged 16–24 years in Britain, noting that more and younger people are participating in sexual practices in more diverse ways.

== Accomplishments ==
1987-A founder of the first National Survey of Sexual Attitudes and Lifestyles. Wellings is a member of the WHO's Gender and Rights Advisory Panel and Human Reproduction Scientific Advisory Group.

== Awards ==
Fellow ad eundem of the Royal College of Obstetricians & Gynaecologists (2003). This is awarded to those who have contributed to the advancement of the science or practice of O&G, though not members of the college.

Fellow of the Academy of Social Sciences (2017).

== Published works ==
Sexual Function Problems And Help Seeking Behaviour In Britain: National Probability Sample Survey (co-written).

Wellings, K., Mitchell, K., & Collumbien, M. (Eds.) (2012). Sexual Health: A Public Health Perspective. Maidenhead, Berkshire: Open University Press. ISBN 9780335244829

Wellings is the co-leader of the National Survey of Sexual Attitudes and Lifestyles.
