= Sex and Culture =

1934 book by J. D. Unwin

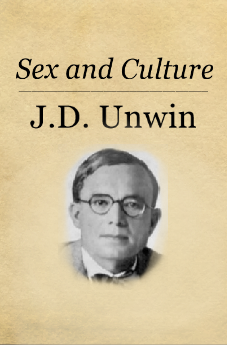
- Cover with a photo of Unwin
- Author: J. D. Unwin
- Language: English
- Publisher: Oxford University Press
- Publication date: 1934
- Publication place: United Kingdom
- Media type: Print
- Pages: 676

Sex and Culture is a 1934 book by English social anthropologist J. D. Unwin concerning the correlation between a society's level of "cultural achievement" and its level of sexual restraint. The book concluded with the theory that as societies develop, they become more sexually liberal, accelerating the social entropy of the society, thereby diminishing its "creative" and "expansive" energy.

According to Unwin, after a nation becomes prosperous, it becomes increasingly liberal concerning sexual morality. It thus loses its cohesion, impetus and purpose, which he claims is irrevocable. Unwin also stated that absolute monogamy required legal equality between men and women.

== Content ==
Unwin's study of 80 native cultures and 6 civilizations led him to conclude that the operant factor behind the cultural decay of a society is largely due to the loosening of sexual conventions and the lessening of monogamous relationships. He purports that through stricter sexual conventions such as abstinence, nations channel their sexual energy into aggressive expansion, conquering "less energetic" countries, as well as into art, science, reform and other indicators of high cultural achievement.

By 'civilized' societies the book refers specifically to the following sixteen historical peoples: Sumerians, Babylonians, Egyptians, Assyrians, Hellenes, Persians, Hindus, Chinese, Japanese, Sassanids, Arabs (Moors), Romans, Teutons, and Anglo-Saxons.

Unwin divides the civilisations into four groups in order to compare how far along each one is in terms of progress. The categories are, from the lowest level of sexual restraint to the highest, 'zoistic', 'manistic', 'deistic' and 'rationalistic'. Unwin bases his categories on certain social phenomena that he observed in his study of the 86 world cultures, phenomena that he found coincided with varying levels of prenuptial chastity:

- Zoistic: He describes societies that do not practice any form of prenuptial chastity as being in the zoistic condition.
- Manistic: He describes societies that did not practice prenuptial chastity or who practiced limited chastity and who paid respects to the dead ('tendance') as being in the manistic cultural condition.
- Deistic: He describes societies in which prenuptial chastity was practiced and who built temples and who had priests as deistic.
- Rationalistic: Unwin does not give a precise definition of what constitutes a rationalistic culture but describes it as the cultural condition that emerges when a society has been in the deistic condition for long enough to appreciate "a new conception of the power in the universe, based on the yet unknown" that is the result of a widening scope of understanding of the natural. Unwin writes that "such a society is in the rationalistic condition. The advance to that condition depends not only on the reduction of sexual opportunity but also upon its preservation at a minimum." According to Unwin, among the studied cultures, only three can be considered to have reached the rationalistic cultural state before entering a cultural decline: the Athenians, Romans and English.

The book concludes with the assertion that, in order to maintain a rationalistic society, sexual drive should be controlled and shifted to more productive work. Unwin says that women should enjoy the same legal rights as men and that the condition for a high level of cultural achievement lies in restricting prenuptial sexual opportunity rather than a state of patriarchy, although the two have historically coincided.

The book states that the effect of sexual constraints, either pre or post-nuptial, has always led to increased flourishing of a culture. Conversely, increased sexual freedom always led to the collapse of a culture three generations later. The highest flourishing of culture had the most powerful combination: pre-nuptial chastity coupled with "absolute monogamy". Rationalist cultures that retained this combination for at least three generations exceeded all other cultures in every area, including literature, art, science, furniture, architecture, engineering, and agriculture. Only three out of the eighty-six cultures studied ever attained this level.

From a superficial study of the available data it might be thought that the questions of female subjection and parental power are indissolubly allied to that of female continence; but actually their alliance in the past has been due to the chance factor that sexual opportunity has never been reduced to a minimum except by depriving women and children of their legal status. It is historically true to say that in the past social energy has been purchased at the price of individual freedom, for it has never been displayed unless the female of the species has sacrificed her rights as an individual and unless children have been treated as mere appendages to the estate of the male parent; but it would be rash to conclude that sexual opportunity cannot be reduced to a minimum under any other conditions. The evidence is that the subjection of women and children is intolerable and therefore temporary; but we should go beyond the evidence if we were to conclude from this fact that compulsory continence also is intolerable and therefore temporary. Such a statement, indeed, is contradicted by the tenor of the whole story.

== Reception ==
Upon its publication in 1934, J. D. Unwin's Sex and Culture received a complex reception that ranged from praise to skepticism. Aldous Huxley was among its most prominent supporters, describing the book as a "work of the highest importance" and later incorporating Unwin's theories on sexual restraint and social energy into his own essays. Within the scientific community, the book was noted for its exhaustive scope—spanning 86 different societies—and its attempt to provide an empirical basis for Sigmund Freud's theories on sublimation and civilization. In more recent decades, the book has seen a resurgence in interest among social conservatives, who view it as a prophetic warning regarding the long-term societal effects of the sexual revolution.
