= J. D. Unwin =

British anthropologist

Joseph Daniel Unwin MC (6 December 1895 — August 1936) was an English ethnologist and social anthropologist at Oxford University and Cambridge University.

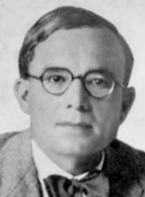
J. D. Unwin

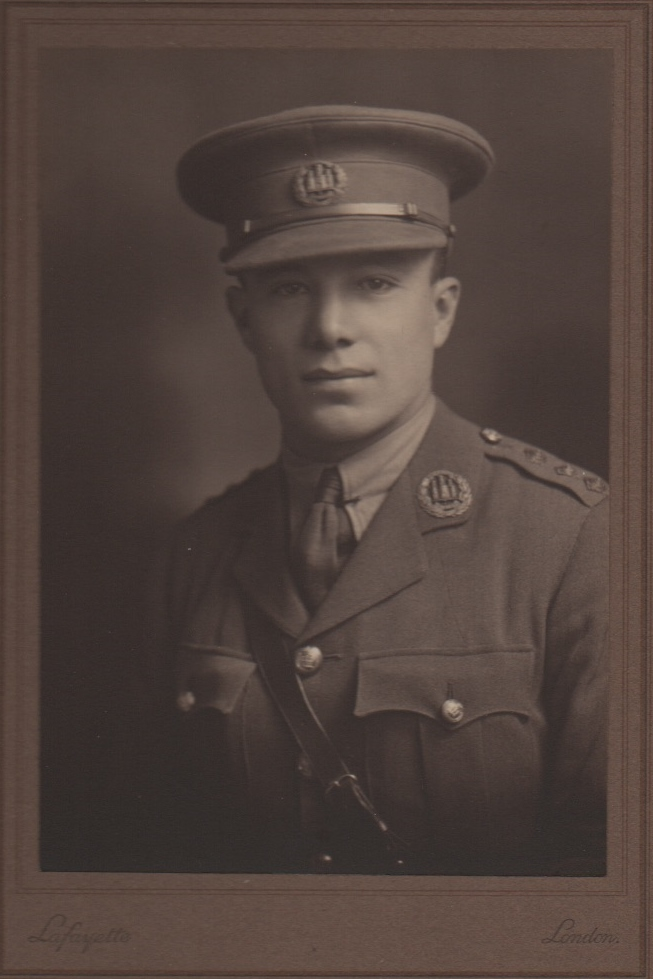
J. D. Unwin, Captain (Northamptonshire Regiment), c. 1917

== Biography ==
Unwin was born on December 6, 1895, in Haverhill, Suffolk. He was educated at Shewsbury School. His enrolment at Oriel College, Oxford was interrupted by the outbreak of World War I in 1914. He served in the Northamptonshire Regiment and the Tank Corps, where he was twice wounded and awarded the Military Cross. After the war, he spent some years in Abyssinia.

In 1933, Unwin received his PhD in anthropology at Peterhouse, Cambridge. His thesis was titled "Sexual Regulations and Cultural Behaviour". He expanded on his research in his 1934 book Sex and Culture.

Unwin also conducted research work for the Home Office on the imprisonment of debtors, publishing "Imprisonment for Debt" in 1935. His expertise in social conditions and problems led to his appointment as head of Cambridge House, a social settlement in South London.

Unwin died in August 1936, at the age of 40, following an unsuccessful medical operation.

== Contributions to anthropology ==
In Sex and Culture (1934), Unwin studied 80 primitive tribes and six known civilizations through 5,000 years of history. He said there was a positive correlation between the cultural achievement of a people and the sexual restraint they observe. Aldous Huxley described Sex and Culture as "a work of the highest importance" in his literature.

According to Unwin, after a nation becomes prosperous, it becomes increasingly liberal concerning sexual morality. It thus loses its cohesion, impetus, and purpose, which he claims is irrevocable.

Unwin also stated, "In the past, too, the greatest energy has been displayed only by those societies which have reduced their sexual opportunity to a minimum by the adoption of absolute monogamy [...]. In every case the women and children were reduced to the level of legal nonentities, sometimes also to the level of chattels, always to the level of mere appendages of the male estate. Eventually they were freed from their disadvantages, but at the same time the sexual opportunity of the society was extended. Sexual desires could then be satisfied in a direct or perverted manner [...]. So the energy of the society decreased, and then disappeared." He further noted, "No society has yet succeeded in regulating the relations between the sexes in such a way as to enable sexual opportunity to remain at a minimum for an extended period." And thus, all societies have collapsed. His hope for the future was that, "by placing the sexes on a level of complete legal equality, and then by altering its economic and social organization in such a way as to render it both possible and tolerable for sexual opportunity to remain at a minimum for an extended period," a society may flourish.

== Works ==
- Sexual Regulations and Human Behaviour. London: Williams & Norgate, 1933.
- Sex and Culture. London: Oxford University Press, 1934.
- The Scandal of Imprisonment for Debt. London: Simpkin Marshall, 1935.
- Sexual Regulations and Cultural Behaviour. London: Oxford University Press, 1935.
- Sex Compatibility in Marriage. New York: Rensselaer, 1939.
- Hopousia: Or, The Sexual and Economic Foundations of a New Society, with an introduction by Aldous Huxley. New York: Oskar Piest, 1940.
  - Our Economic Problems and Their Solution (An Extract from "Hopousia.") London: George Allen & Unwin, Ltd., 1944.

=== Selected articles ===
- "Monogamy as a Condition of Social Energy," The Hibbert Journal, Vol. XXV, 1927.
- "The Classificatory System of Relationship," Man, Vol. XXIX, Sep., 1929.
- "Kinship," Man, Vol. XXX, Apr., 1930.
- "Reply to Dr. Morant's 'Cultural Anthropology and Statistics'," Man, Vol. XXXV, Mar., 1935.

=== Other ===
- Dark Rapture: The Sex-life of the African Negro, with an Introduction by J. D. Unwin. New York: Walden Publication, 1939.

== See also ==
- Sex and Culture, 1934 book by J. D. Unwin
- Ethnology
- Anthropology
