= Shelly's Leg =

Former gay bar in Seattle, Washington (USA)

Coordinates: 47°36′1″N 122°20′7″W

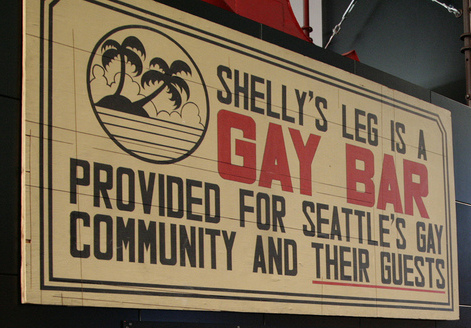
Shelly's Leg sign in the Museum of History and Industry.

Shelly's Leg was the first openly operated gay bar in Seattle. It operated from 1973 until sometime c. 1978.

== Founding ==
=== Shelly Bauman ===
Shelly Bauman was born in Chicago on July 23, 1947. She studied dance there until she was 16, at which time she became a runaway due to family tension. She performed striptease in Chicago, Hawaii, and Florida, moving to Rainier Valley, Seattle, in 1968 to continue her profession there. She quit dancing after the Bastille Day accident. As a consequence of the accident she founded Shelly's Leg.

Bauman had an eventful life beyond that, surviving two fires and living in Florida and Hawaii as well as Chicago and Seattle. She died in her home in Bremerton, Washington, on November 18, 2010.

=== Loss of leg ===
On July 14, 1970, at the Seattle Bastille Day parade in Pioneer Square, Seattle, Bauman was in attendance enjoying the parade. At 10:00 pm a parade consisting of a Dixieland band, two cars, and an old fire engine hauling a vintage cannon exited the Sinking Ship to begin a performance. The cannon accidentally fired a ball of wadded up wet confetti which hit Bauman just as she disembarked the fire engine. Bauman's lower abdomen was severely injured, and doctors were forced to amputate her left leg.

When Bauman recovered, she pursued a lawsuit against the cannon operator, the parade organizers, and the city of Seattle. Her case settled with her receiving US$330,000. She used this money to found a nightclub which she named "Shelly's Leg." Bauman also considered naming the bar Great White Swallow or Organ Grinder, but both names were rejected by the city in the licensing process.

== Nightclub ==
Bauman purchased a hotel in Pioneer Square, Seattle, and in 1973 converted it into a gay bar and nightclub. Bauman would attend parties there in her wheelchair. The club also featured Seattle's first professional DJ sound system.

"From the moment it opened, Shelly's was a hit. There was no place like it north of San Francisco. Its core aesthetic, as dictated by Bauman, was glamour—if not anathema to Seattle's blue-collar introversion then at least unheard of here. The club put sexualized spectacle—as flaunted in pop culture by glam-rockers like David Bowie, the New York Dolls and films like Cabaret—on center stage."

The dancing at Shelly's Leg came to an abrupt end at around 1am on December 4, 1975. A fuel truck carrying an attached tank trailer struck a guardrail and jackknifed on the slick asphalt of the lower deck of the nearby Highway 99 viaduct near South Washington and South Main streets. The trailer detached from the truck, hit a roadway column, overturned and split open, spilling a river of flaming fuel onto the cars of a Burlington Northern Railway train, some parked vehicles and the building housing Shelly's Leg. The wall of fire was so hot, it shattered the disco's windows. Everyone made it out safely through a rear door.

Bauman and her co-proprietors were able to renovate the club using insurance money. Nevertheless, the club's popularity was permanently damaged by the incident. Ultimately, the club's final demise was caused by a financial dispute among the three owners that led to the club being padlocked by the Internal Revenue Service, and Shelly's Leg thus abruptly closed.

The sign from the nightclub is now an exhibit at Museum of History & Industry (MOHAI).

Shelly Bauman and Shelly's Leg are the subject of Wes Hurley's 2025 documentary film Shelly's Leg narrated by Kathleen Turner.
