= Diamond Parking =

American parking lot operating company

Coordinates: 47°36′07″N 122°20′04″W

- Type: Private
- Founded: 1922
- Founder: Louis Diamond
- Headquarters: 605 1st Avenue, Suite 600; Seattle, Washington, United States
- Number of locations: over 1,900
- Area served: United States; Canada
- Website: www.diamondparking.com

Diamond Parking is an American company that operates parking lots in nine U.S. states and two Canadian provinces. It is based in Seattle, Washington, and was founded in 1922 by Louis Diamond. As of 2021, the company operates 1,914 parking lots with over 148,000 stalls in 47 cities.

== History ==
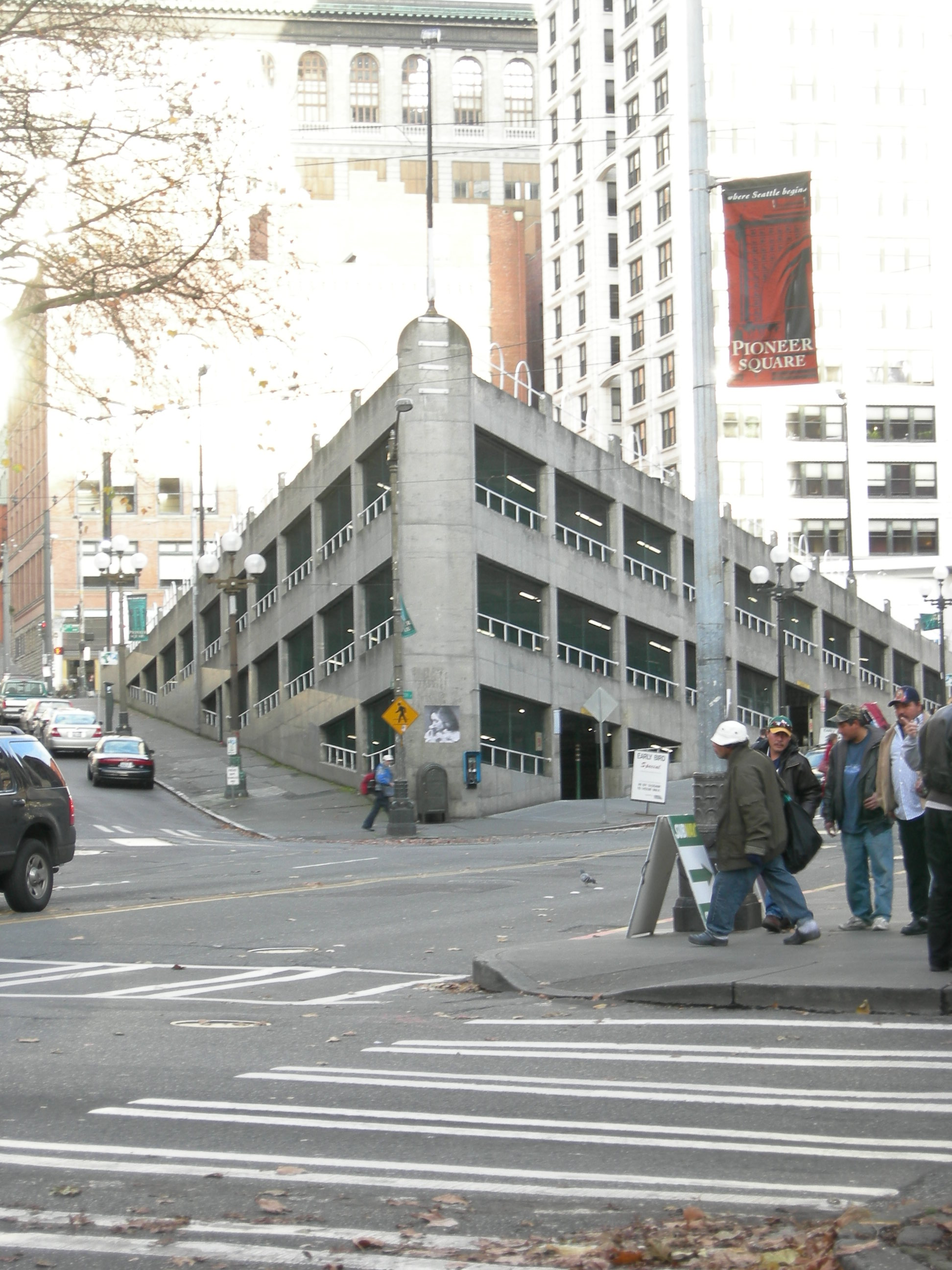
Seattle's prominent Sinking Ship garage managed by Diamond Parking

Louis Diamond, the son of immigrants from the Russian Empire, founded a car service company in 1922 and charged a daily fee of 10 cents for parking near the Medical Dental Building. The business later expanded to manage 17 parking lots prior to a shutdown during World War II. Louis transferred control of the company in 1946 to his brothers Josef "Joe" (1908–2007), an attorney, and Leon. They introduced self-service payment with coin boxes to make up for the lack of parking lot attendants at the time; the practice was later adopted by other parking companies.

To prevent non-paying customers from leaving, Diamond Parking employed several techniques, including chaining vehicles to a 50-US-gallon (190 L) drum and disconnecting car batteries. Joe Diamond retained control of the company, which had 1,000 parking lots in nine U.S. states by 2007, until passing its ownership and management to his son and grandson. The business also owned other real estate in the Western U.S., particularly office buildings and entertainment venues such as the Seattle Cinerama until its sale to Paul Allen in 1998. Diamond Parking was also awarded the contract to enforce street parking rules in Bellevue, a major suburb of Seattle. The company also manages the Sinking Ship garage in Seattle's Pioneer Square, which opened in 1962 and is owned by the Kubota–Fujii family.

A class action lawsuit was filed against Diamond Parking in 2002 for imposing $30 fines to customers who had failed to pay for their parking tickets; the fee was found to be illegal under Washington state law and a $1.8 million payout to 57,000 affected customers was ordered by a U.S. District Court judge. A software glitch with payment processor Elavon in early 2013 caused some Seattle locations to overcharge for parking. In October 2013, several people in British Columbia complained that Diamond Parking was issuing tickets to drivers who were not even parked in their lots.
