= Hotel Seattle =

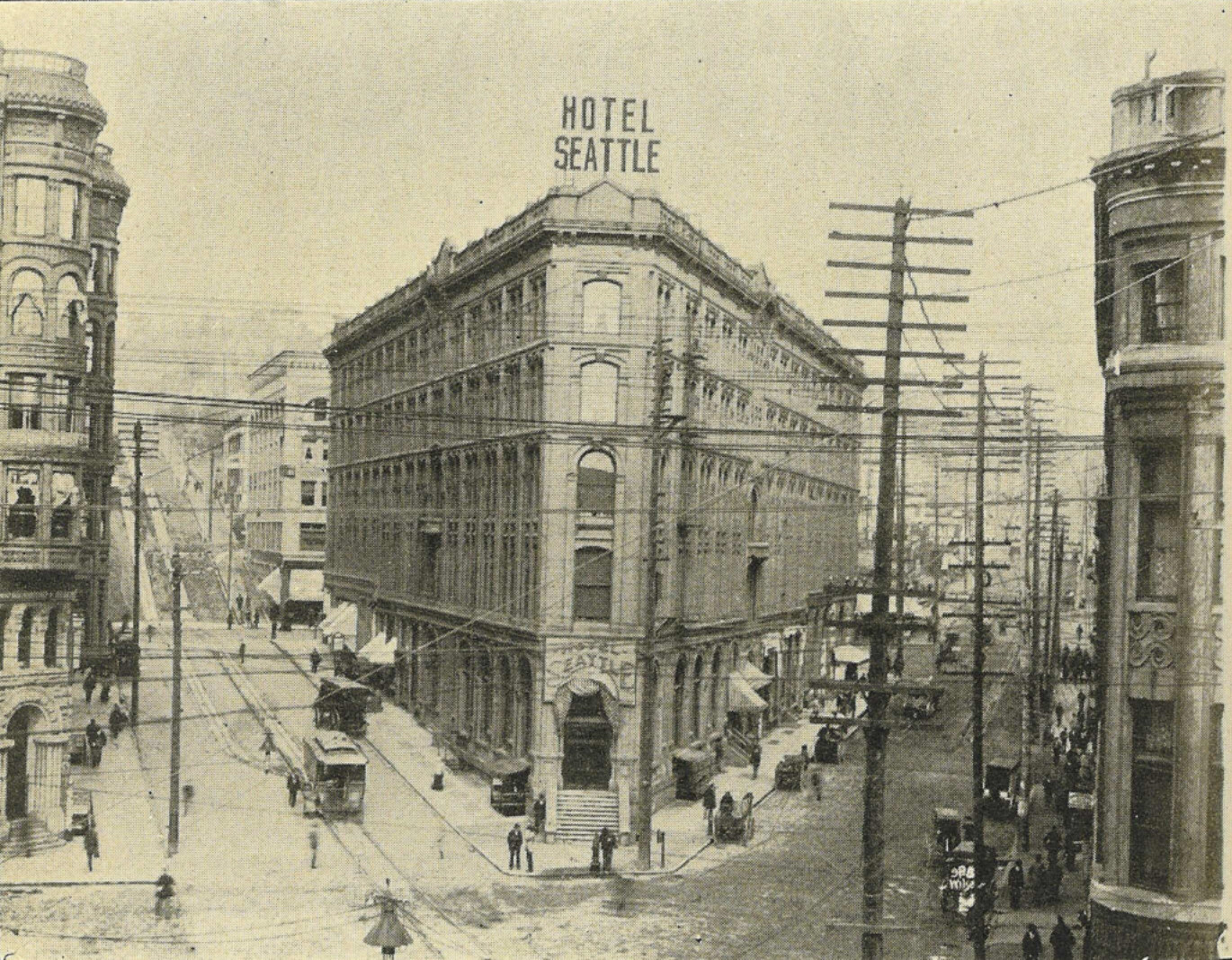
- Hotel Seattle, 1900
- Interactive map of the Hotel Seattle area
- Former names: Seattle Hotel, Collins Block
- Etymology: Seattle, Washington

General information
- Status: Demolished
- Architectural style: Victorian
- Location: Pioneer Square, Seattle, Washington, United States
- Coordinates: 47°36′07″N 122°19′58″W
- Estimated completion: 1890
- Demolished: 1961

Technical details
- Floor count: 5

Hotel Seattle, also known as Seattle Hotel and the Collins Block, was located in Pioneer Square in a triangular block bound by James Street to the north, Yesler Way to the south, and 2nd Avenue to the east, just steps away from the Pioneer Building. It succeeded two prior hotels, a wooden and then a masonry Occidental Hotel.

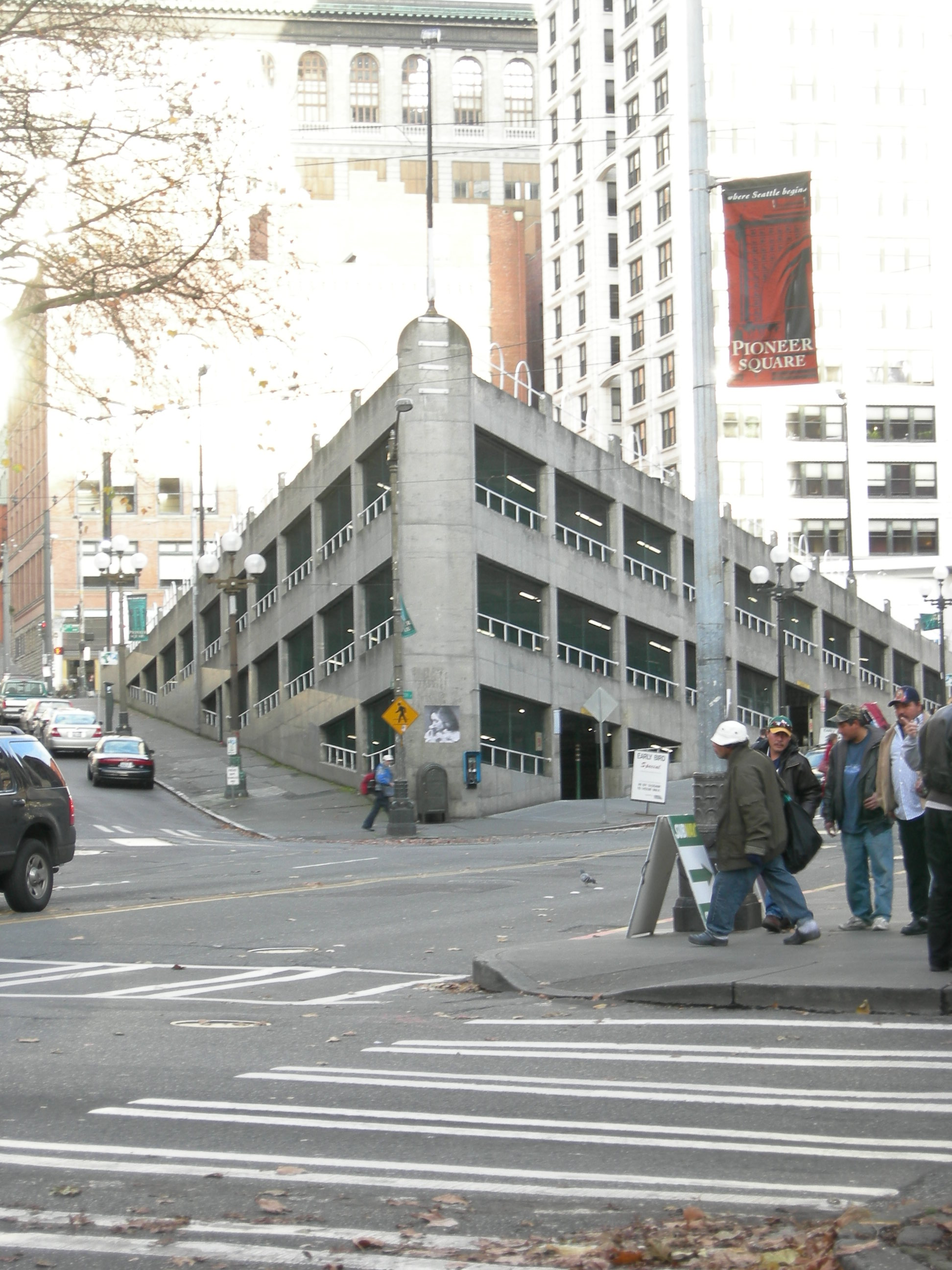
Sinking Ship parking lot, 2007

It was built in 1890 after the Great Seattle Fire and served as a hotel until early in the 20th century. By the time neighboring Smith Tower was completed in 1914, the Seattle Hotel had become an office building. It was demolished in the early 1960s and the site is now home to the Sinking Ship, a parking garage.

== Precursor: The Occidental Hotel, I and II (1861–1889) ==
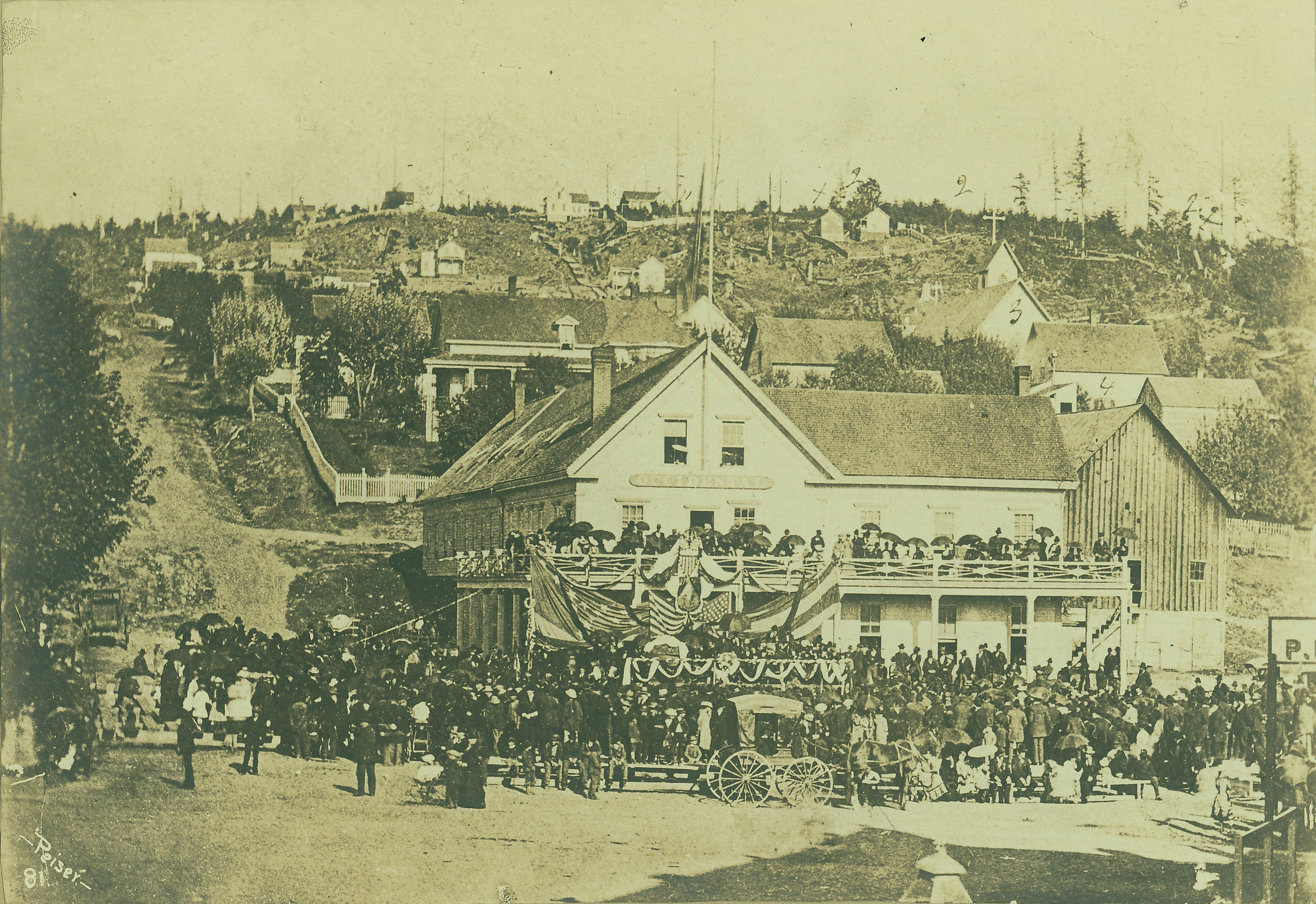
Memorial services for assassinated U.S. president James Garfield in Occidental Square September 27, 1881 in front of the Occidental Hotel

Before the Seattle Hotel rose in 1890, there was the Occidental Hotel. The first Occidental, which opened in 1861, was a wooden building. Twenty years later, on September 26, 1881, it held a memorial service for President James Garfield, who had died five days earlier from injuries sustained when he was shot in July.

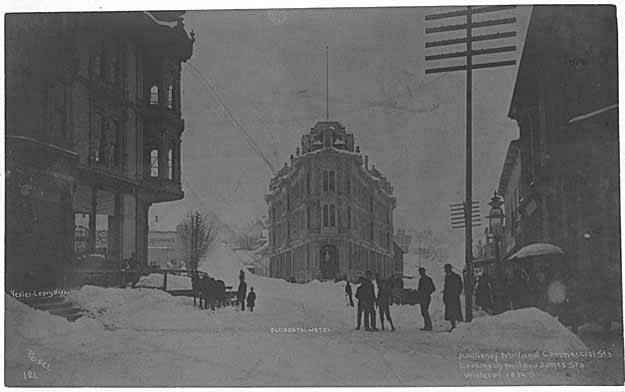
The triangular 2nd Occidental Hotel after a snowfall in 1884

In 1883, the wooden structure was torn down and John Collins built a bigger, grander one in the same location. Construction bids were accepted in February 1883. Construction for the new hotel began on about May 1, 1883. The architect was Donald Mackay.

The Puget Sound National Bank, which was co-founded by Jacob Furth, was located in the Occidental Hotel.

The new hotel lasted just four years, before burning down in the Great Seattle Fire on June 6, 1889. The second Occidental Hotel, like the Seattle Hotel, was also triangular-shaped.

== Description ==
The Seattle Hotel was a triangular-shaped building (much like the Flatiron Building in Manhattan, New York), with its narrow face located at the junction of James and Yesler. It stood five stories high and for much of its existence bore the inscription "1890" above the fifth-story window, signifying the year it was completed. Designed in the Victorian architectural tradition and clad in white cement, it stood in stark contrast to its dark brick and stone neighbors.

== Significance of its demolition ==
Damaged by the 1949 Olympia earthquake and abandoned by 1961, the Seattle Hotel was torn down and replaced with a parking garage, derisively called the "Sinking Ship" as part of the initial stages of an urban-renewal plan that would level all the old buildings in the district. That was as far as the plan went. The old hotel's demise kicked off a preservation movement spearheaded by the likes of Alan Black, Victor Steinbrueck and historian/author Bill Speidel which led to a revival of the Pioneer Square district. By 1970, with its buildings refurbished, a historic district area including the Square was listed on the National Register of Historic Places.
