= Pioneer Square, Seattle =

Coordinates: 47°36′06″N 122°19′55″W

- Pioneer Square–Skid Road District
- U.S. National Register of Historic Places
- U.S. Historic district
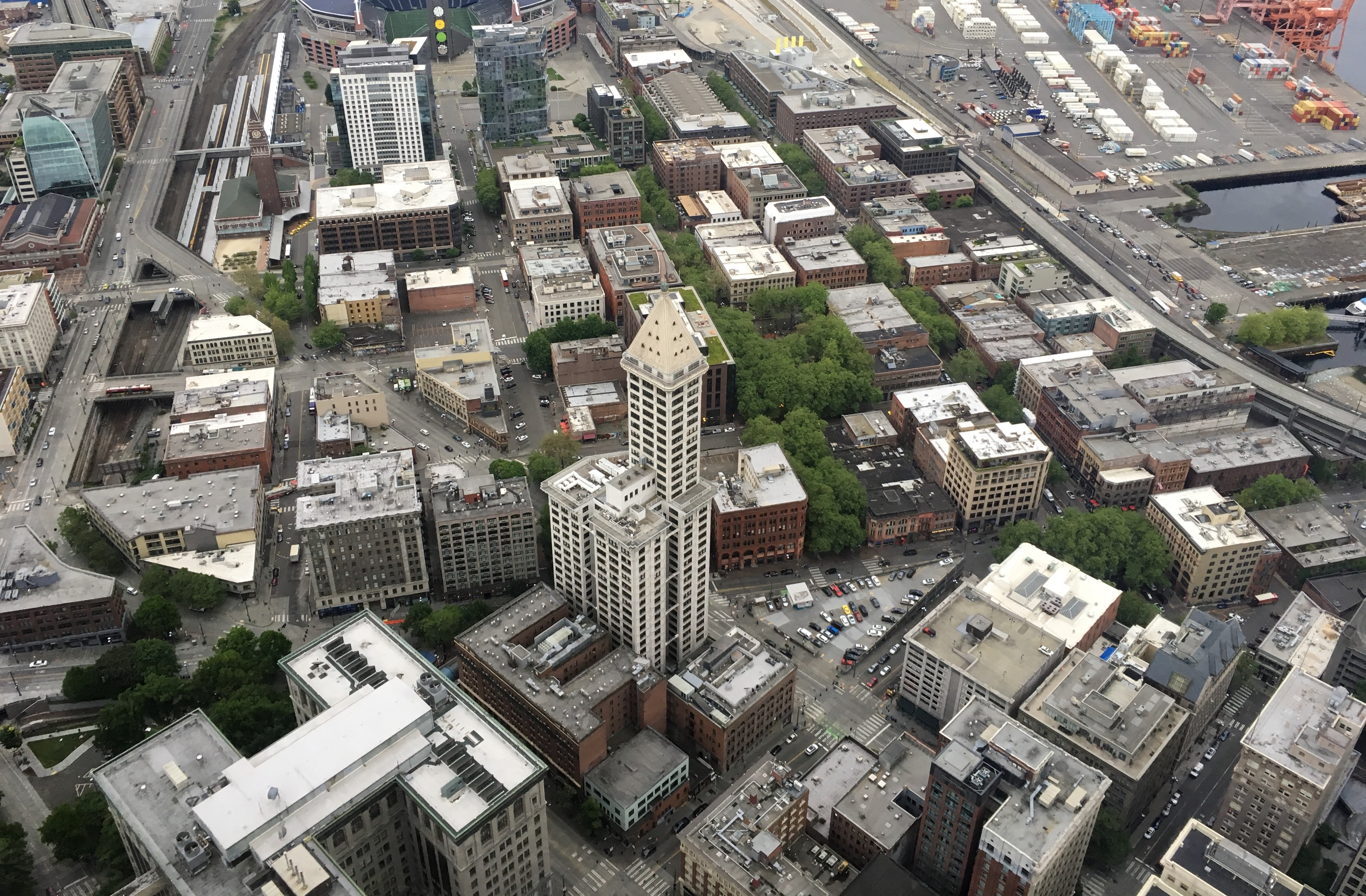

- Location within Downtown Seattle Location within Washington (state)
- Location: Seattle, Washington
- Built: 1853
- Architect: Elmer H. Fisher (original)
- Architectural style: Late Victorian, Romanesque (original); Italianate, Romanesque (increase); Chicago (2nd increase)
- NRHP reference No.: 70000086 (original); 78000341 (increase 1); 88000739 (increase 2)

Significant dates
- Added to NRHP: June 22, 1970
- Boundary increases: July 7, 1978; June 16, 1988

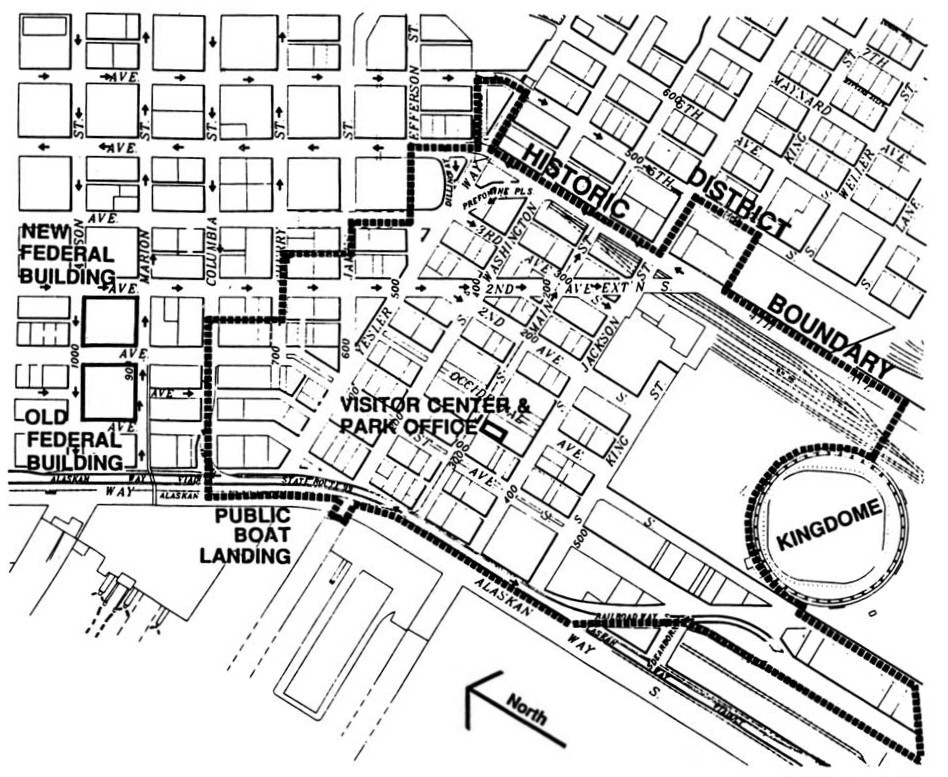
Pioneer Square–Skid Road Historic District. This map also shows how Second Avenue Extension continues a piece of the north-of-Yesler street grid into the area south of Yesler Way. (The map dates from before the Kingdome was replaced by two new stadiums.)

Pioneer Square is a neighborhood in the southwest corner of downtown Seattle, Washington, US. It was once the heart of the city: Seattle's founders settled there in 1852, following a brief six-month settlement at Alki Point on the far side of Elliott Bay. The early structures in the neighborhood were mostly wooden, and nearly all burned in the Great Seattle Fire of 1889. By the end of 1890, dozens of brick and stone buildings had been erected in their stead; to this day, the architectural character of the neighborhood derives from these late 19th century buildings, mostly examples of Richardsonian Romanesque.

The neighborhood takes its name from a small triangular plaza near the corner of First Avenue and Yesler Way, originally known as Pioneer Place. The Pioneer Square–Skid Road Historic District, a historic district including that plaza and several surrounding blocks, is listed on the National Register of Historic Places.

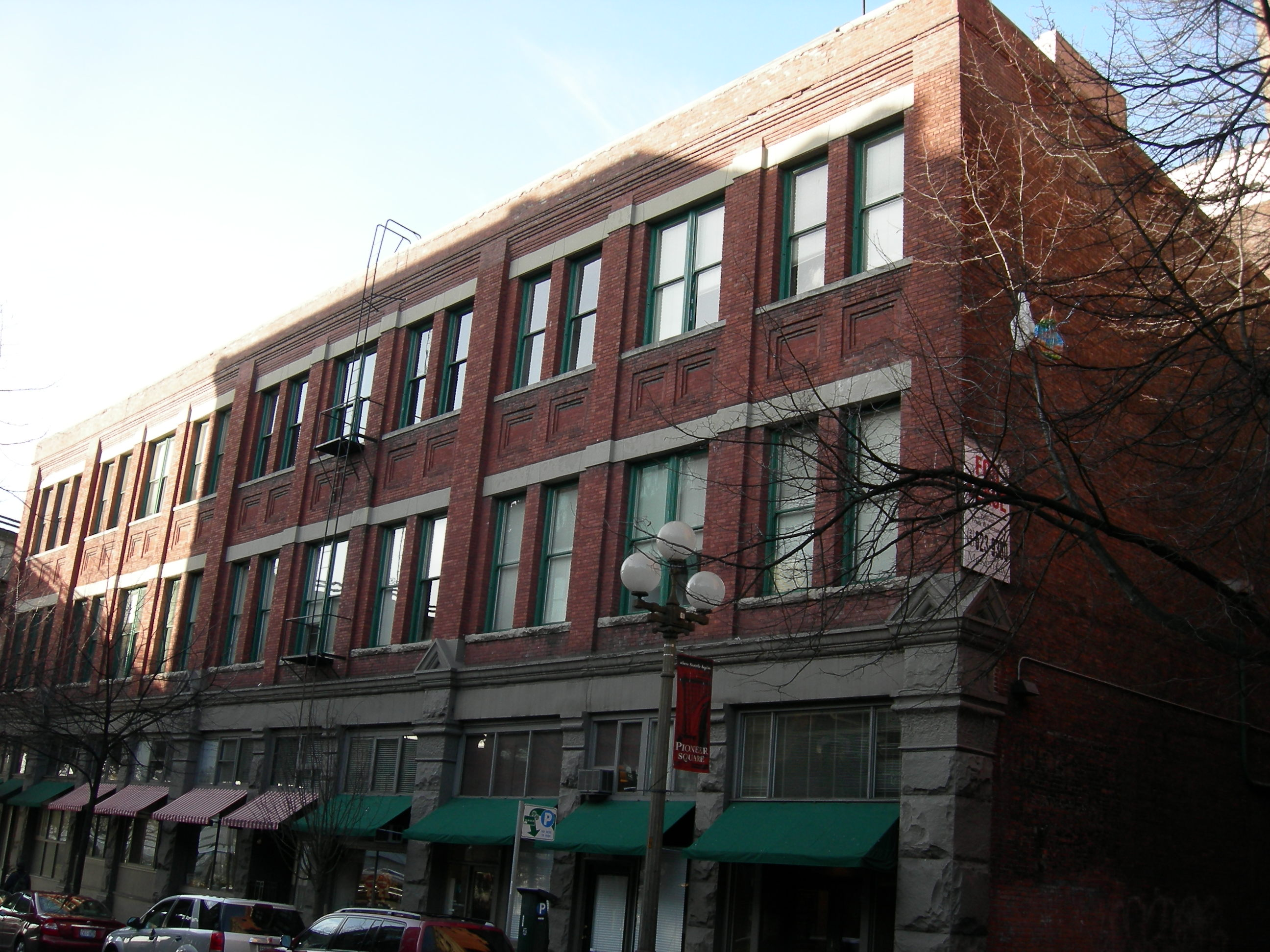
Washington Park Building on Washington Street in the Pioneer Square neighborhood. It was built in 1890 just after the Great Seattle Fire and was originally the Lowman and Hanford Printing and Binding Building

Like virtually all Seattle neighborhoods, the Pioneer Square neighborhood lacks definitive borders. It is bounded roughly by Alaskan Way S. on the west, beyond which are the docks of Elliott Bay; by S. King Street on the south, beyond which is SoDo; by 5th Avenue S. on the east, beyond which is the International District; and it extends between one and two blocks north of Yesler Way, beyond which is the rest of Downtown. Because Yesler Way marks the boundary between two different plats, the street grid north of Yesler does not line up with the neighborhood's other streets (nor with the compass), so the northern border of the district zigzags along numerous streets.

In some places, the Pioneer Square–Skid Road Historic District extends beyond these borders. It includes Union Station east of 4th Avenue S., and several city blocks south of S. King Street.

== History ==
=== Early history ===
Dzidzilalich or dᶻidᶻəlaĺič was a winter village established on what is now Pioneer Square, near Yesler Way and the waterfront. Dzidzilalich is a Lushotseed name that translates to "a place to cross over" or "the little crossing over place", and it was built on an ancient trail where people could access nearby tideflats for fishing or travel to Lake Washington and beyond. The village had been built by the Duwamish ancestors of today's Duwamish, Suquamish, and Muckleshoot tribes, and it eventually had eight longhouses, to support a population of about 200 people. By 1852 the longhouses were abandoned, with only one structure still standing, but the site remained an important gathering and trading hub. Lushotseed speakers referred to Seattle by the name dᶻidᶻəlaĺič until at least World War II.

In 1852, Arthur Denny, Carson Boren, and William Bell left their establishment on Alki Beach to explore Elliott Bay. They decided to create their own village at Dzidzilalich because it was better situated for a harbor than Alki. By 1852 most of the Denny Party moved to the village, which they initially called Dewamps or Duwamps.

The settlement's importance was guaranteed in 1852, when Henry Yesler chose the site for his lumber mill, which was located on Elliott Bay at the foot of what is now Yesler Way, right on the border between the land claimed (and soon thereafter platted) by David Swinson "Doc" Maynard (to the south) and that platted by Denny and Boren.

Much of the neighborhood is on landfill: in pioneer times, the area roughly between First and Second Avenue, bounded on the south by Jackson Street, and extending north almost to Yesler Way (about two-and-a-half city blocks) was a low-lying offshore island. The mainland shore roughly followed what is now Yesler Way to about Fourth Avenue, then ran southeast, at an angle of about 45 degrees to the current shoreline. Slightly inland were steep bluffs, which were largely smoothed away by regrading in the late 19th and early 20th century.

=== "Below the Line" ===
Yesler Way, originally Mill Street, is the main east–west street through the Pioneer Square neighborhood. Immediately south of the square itself, it was the dividing line between Maynard's original claim (to the south) and Boren's (to the north). It received many nicknames: Deadline, the northern border of the Great Restricted District, Maynardtown, Down on the Sawdust, the Lava Beds, the Tenderloin, White Chapel, or Wappyville, (after Charles Wappenstein, a particularly corrupt police chief.), where low entertainment and vice were long tolerated. One of the earliest names, and one that stuck well into second half of the 20th century, was "Skid Row".

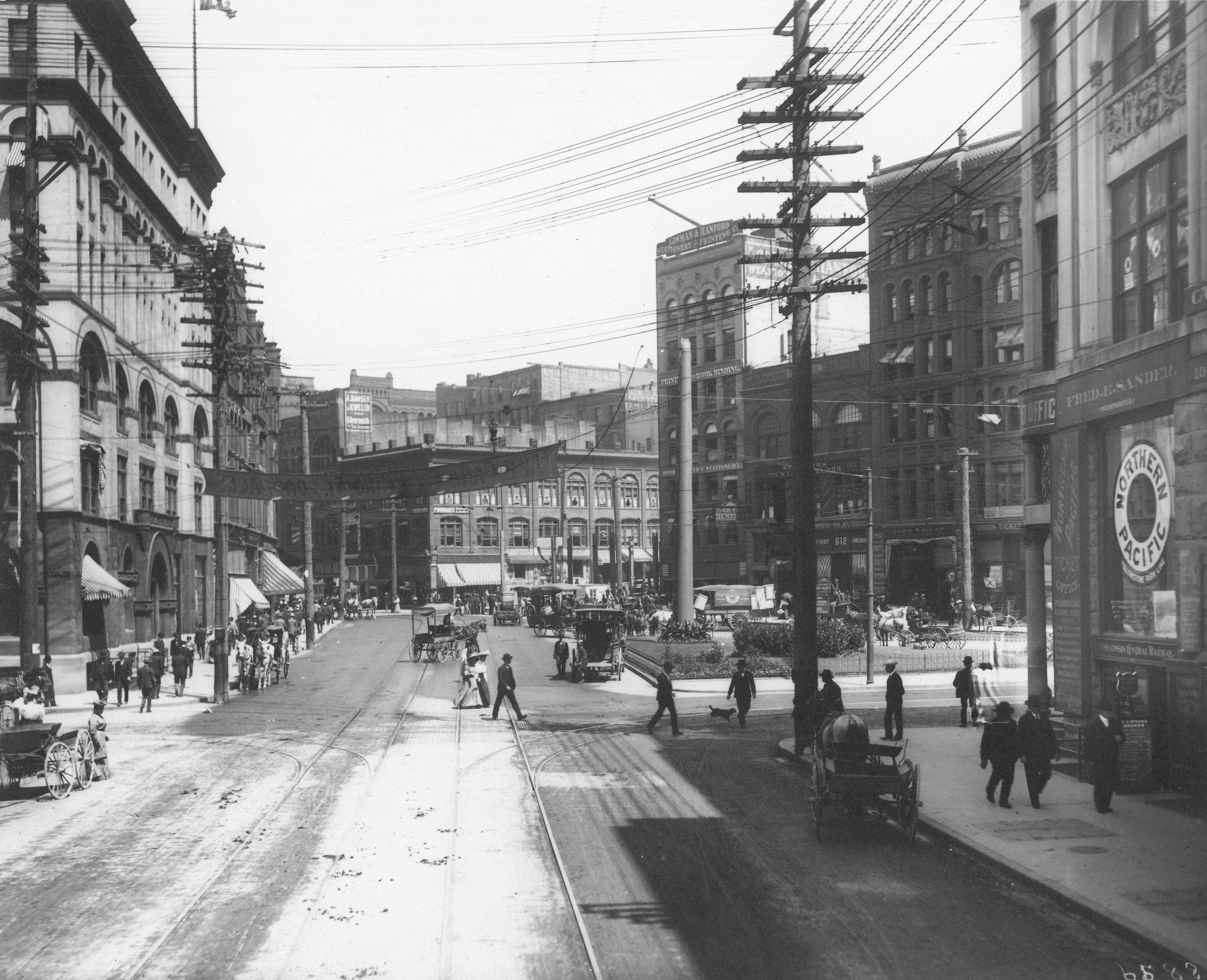
1st Ave S, Pioneer Square district, 1901

Henry Broderick, approaching his 80th birthday in 1959, wrote of the neighborhood south of Yesler, "[P]erhaps never in all history, certainly not in America, has there ever existed such a massive collection of the demimonde grouped in a restricted area." There were "parlor houses" with marquees, celebrity madames—among them Lou Graham, Lila Young, and Raw McRoberts—and piano "professors". Scrupulous in their dealings, the parlor houses were completely tolerated by the city at the time, but there were also the far more controversial "crib houses" such as the Midway, the Paris and Dreamland near the corner of Sixth Avenue South and King Street. Each had a hundred or more cubicles—"cribs"—and they were not known for any particular honesty in their dealings. The city health department conducted inspections and attempted to keep venereal disease under control, but the state of medicine at the time was not such as to give them any great chance of success. Besides the brothels there were "an ungodly mixture of dives, dumps ... pawnshops, hash houses, dope parlors and ... the et cetera that kept the police guessing." Gambling prospered, as did the Box houses: part theater, part bar, part brothel. Police only dared enter the neighborhood in teams. Perhaps the only safe haven in the neighborhood was the saloon "Our House", which rented out safe deposit boxes.

Seattle's non-Native settlers pressured Native Americans to leave the town by a variety of measures, including harassment, the 1855 Treaty of Point Elliott and an 1865 city law. Between 1855 and 1904, non-Native settlers burned 94 Duwamish longhouses to the ground and covered ancient villages to expand Seattle. However, the town relied on Native Americans for trade, canoe transportation, and labor at the Yesler mill. As the town grew and forced many Native residents to move further away, eventually some visited the town via camping on Ballast Island, a small artificial island created by dumped ship ballast near Washington and Main streets. People visited and lived on the island until the 1890s, when the town built piers over the land. The island's residents worked in sawmills, canneries, and hops farms; patronized city businesses; and traded at the Golden Rule Bazaar. They also hosted events like canoe races, salmon smoking and feasts.

In 1870, Father Francis Xavier Prefontaine founded Seattle's first Catholic Church, the Church of Our Lady of Good Help in the heart of this district, at Third Avenue South and Washington Street. Two decades later, Lou Graham opened the city's most famous parlor house diagonally across the street. Father Prefontaine is commemorated by a street in the neighborhood, Prefontaine Place.

=== Late 19th century ===
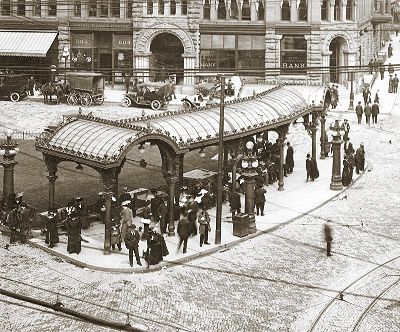
Pioneer Square pergola, 1914

By the end of 1889, Seattle had become the largest city in Washington with 40,000 residents. That same year, the Great Seattle Fire resulted in the complete destruction of Pioneer Square. However, the economy was strong at the time, so Pioneer Square was quickly rebuilt. Many of the new buildings show the influence of the Romanesque Revival architectural mode, although influence of earlier Victorian modes is also widespread. Because of drainage problems new development was built at a higher level literally burying the remains of old Pioneer Square. Anticipating the planned regrade, many buildings were built with two entrances, one at the old, low level, and another higher up. Visitors can take the Seattle Underground Tour to see what remains of the old storefronts.

Just before the fire, cable car service was instituted from Pioneer Square along Yesler Way to Lake Washington and the Leschi neighborhood.

Regrades buried most of the earlier village of Dzidzilalich and its surroundings, making it hard for 20th century scholars to study the village's history. Development and fire during the 1890s and 1900s covered most locations on Elliott Bay that were important to Native residents of the region.

In 1891, German-born Frederick Trump, President Donald Trump's grandfather, owned the Dairy Restaurant on Washington Street.

=== 20th century ===
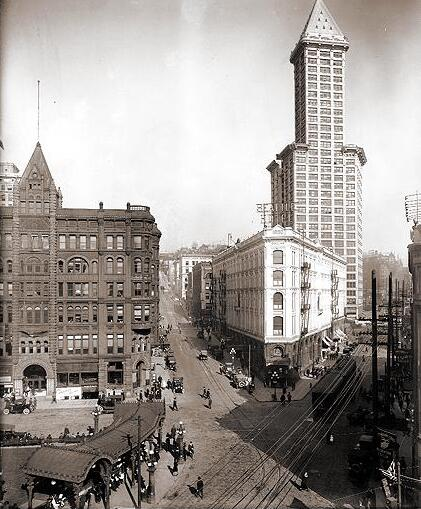
Pioneer Square, March 17, 1917. In the upper-right is the Smith Tower. Below it is the Seattle Hotel. On the left are the Pioneer Building and the pergola.

During the Klondike Gold Rush in 1897 and 1898, Seattle was a center for travel to Alaska. Thousands of so-called "stampeders" passed through Seattle, making the city's merchants prosperous.

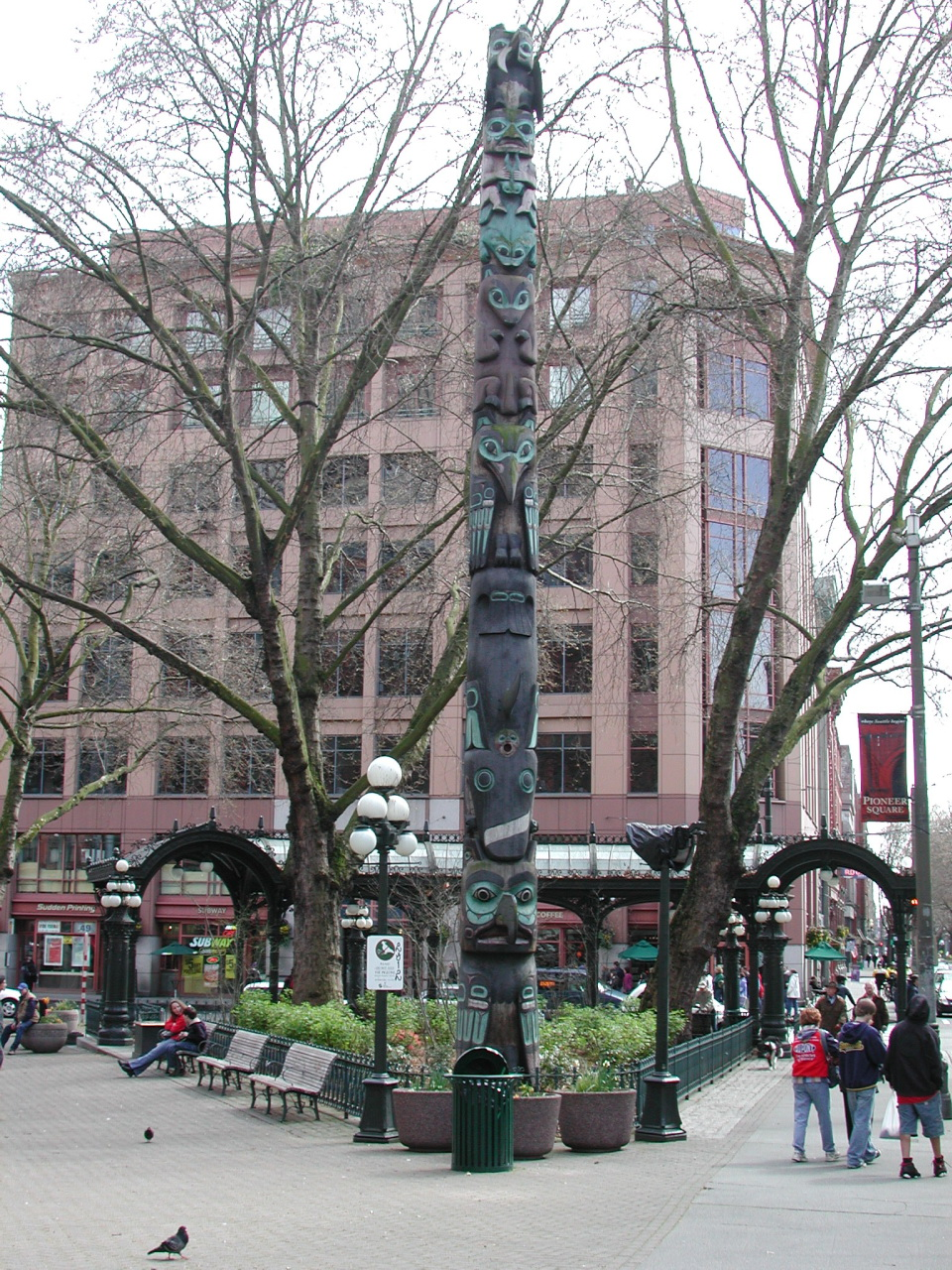
Pioneer Square totem pole in 2008

In 1899, a group of citizens stole a Tlingit totem pole and placed it in Pioneer Place Park. After the Tlingit demanded compensation for the theft, the group's organizers agreed to pay a settlement of $500. When an arsonist severely damaged the pole in 1938, the U.S. Forest Service hired a group of Tlingit artisans through the Civilian Conservation Corps to craft a replacement that was installed in 1940.

In addition to the totem pole, an iron and glass pergola designed by Julian F. Everett as part of a lavish underground comfort station and a bust of Chief Seattle were added to the park in 1909.

1914 saw the completion of the Smith Tower, which at the time was the tallest building west of the Mississippi River. However, by that time, the heart of Downtown Seattle had moved north. The building of Second Avenue Extension in 1928–29 reconfigured the eastern portion of the neighborhood, by extending a piece of the north-of-Yesler street grid south past Yesler and "slicing into buildings in its path". The cable car line serving the area was shut down on August 10, 1940.

==== Queer culture, 1920s – 1970s ====
During the 1920s and 1930s, Pioneer Square became the first center of social life for Seattle's LGBTQ community when several gay bars were able to open there. One of its nicknames was "Fairyville", after a slur for gay men. Because "police found it convenient to keep the marginal types in one nicely packaged ghetto", and Pioneer Square already had a reputation as "Skid Road", it was the only neighborhood to establish a queer scene at this time. In this period, establishments knowingly serving gay people were primarily located in Pioneer Square and Downtown Seattle.

The Casino, also known as "Madame Peabody's Dancing Academy for Young Ladies", was a Pioneer Square pool hall owned by straight people. It opened in 1930 and had a reputation as the only West Coast establishment that accepted gay people, allowing same-sex dancing. The Spinning Wheel and The Double Header started a few years later, also as straight-owned bars in Pioneer Square that accepted straight and gay customers. Both bars became known for their drag shows, which were called female impersonation acts at the time. The Double Header became the oldest continually operating gay bar on the West Coast before closing in 2015.

In 1946, The Garden of Allah cabaret opened in Pioneer Square. It was Seattle's first gay-owned bar and welcomed gay men and lesbians, along with straight people, tourists, and soldiers. Open for a decade, it became the center of Seattle's queer social scene. After Seattle's first lesbian bar, The Hub, opened downtown in 1950, Pioneer Square lesbian bars like the Grand Union, Sappho's Tavern, and the Silver Slipper followed. The Mocambo opened in 1951, likely the first openly gay bar to serve hard liquor legally, and was the most popular bar for gay men from the 1950s to the 1970s. Owner Bob Bedord started many of Seattle's LGBTQ organizations from Pioneer Square, including the city's imperial court and Jamma Phi, Seattle's first gay social group. Bedord also founded the Queen City Business Guild, which helped stop the system of police harassment and pay-offs required of gay bars. Bathhouses and more bars soon opened in the neighborhood, like the Atlas Steam Baths.

By the 1960s, Pioneer Square's LGBTQ community had spaces to gather in the neighborhood for all 24 hours of the day. This was largely because the Golden Horseshoe tavern opened and started serving customers at 6 AM, the time The Casino closed in the morning. Shelly's Leg opened for a couple years in the 1970s, and openly announced itself as a gay bar, becoming famous as Seattle's first disco. Pioneer Square remained the center of Seattle's LGBTQ community until the 1970s, when Renton Hill, then Capitol Hill, became known as the city's current gayborhoods.

==== 1960s ====
In the 1960s, Pioneer Square became a target of urban renewal. One proposal was to replace the buildings with parking garages to serve Downtown Seattle. In 1962, the historic Seattle Hotel was replaced with one such parking garage, commonly referred to as the "Sinking Ship" garage because of its appearance when viewed from 1st and Yesler; it stands to this day. Another proposal was to build a ring road which would have required destroying many of Pioneer Square's buildings. Many buildings were saved by the "benign neglect" of landowner Sam Israel. Although he rarely sold any of his buildings, he sold the Union Trust Building to architect Ralph Anderson, whose rehabilitation of that building set the pattern for the neighborhood's rehabilitation. In 1970, preservationists such as Bill Speidel, Victor Steinbrueck, and others succeeded in listing the neighborhood as historic district listed on the National Register of Historic Places. Later that year, Pioneer Square became a city preservation district.

==== 1980s ====
Streetcar service returned to Pioneer Square on May 29, 1982, with the opening of the Waterfront Streetcar. The streetcar discontinued service on November 19, 2005, since its carbarn was razed to make room for the Olympic Sculpture Park.

=== 21st century ===
In the 21st century, Pioneer Square is home to art galleries, internet companies, cafés, sports bars, nightclubs, bookstores, and a unit of the Klondike Gold Rush National Historical Park, the other unit of which is located in Skagway, Alaska. Rehabilitation of pre-existing buildings continues into the 21st century, including practices such as reinforcing brick walls with steel structures and renovating the interiors to meet modern comfort and safety standards.

== Public art ==
=== Forest For The Trees ===
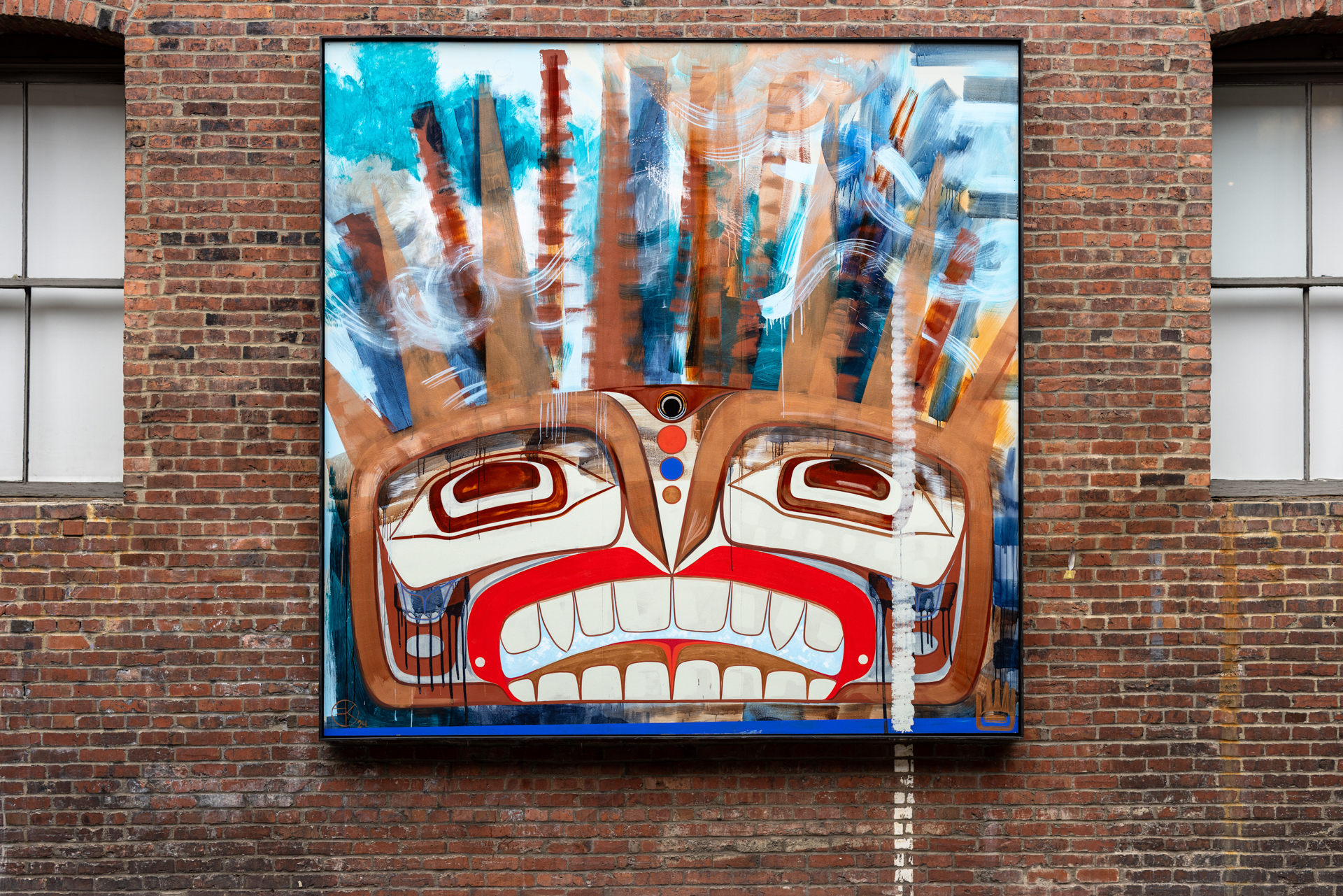

This public art initiative developed by ARTXIV in collaboration with the nonprofit Forest for the Trees, aimed at transforming Seattle's historic Pioneer Square into a year-round open-air gallery. The project features framed artworks displayed on building facades and in alleyways, blending contemporary art with the district's architectural heritage. The initiative supports artists through a commission-based model, with proceeds from artwork sales reinvested to sustain future installations. By integrating art into the urban environment, the project enhances community engagement and expands public access to creative expression.

=== Fallen Firefighters Memorial ===
Each spring since 1989, on the weekend nearest June 6, the city has celebrated the Pioneer Square Fire Festival with a parade and display of antique and modern fire apparatus, demonstrations of fire fighter skills, food and craft booths, and a party. On June 6, 1998, the anniversary of the 1889 fire, fell on a Saturday. This year the Festival took on additional meaning when the Fallen Fire Fighter Memorial was dedicated. Thanks to the work of Battalion Chief Wes Goss and his Memorial Committee the bronze sculpture was now in place. On a granite block is inscribed the name of each Seattle fire fighter who died in the line of duty.

== Gallery ==
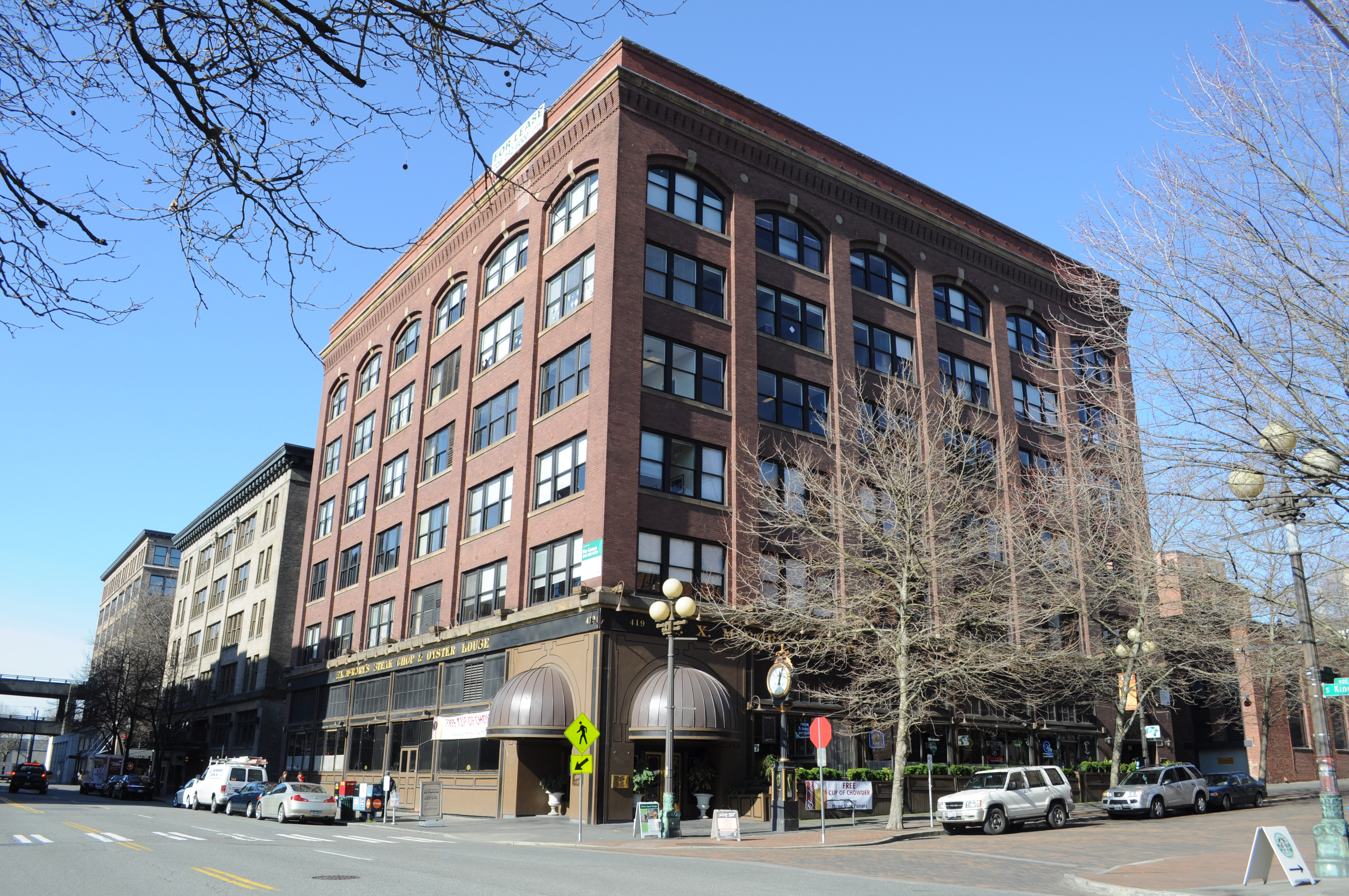
Manufacturers Building now home to F. X. McRory

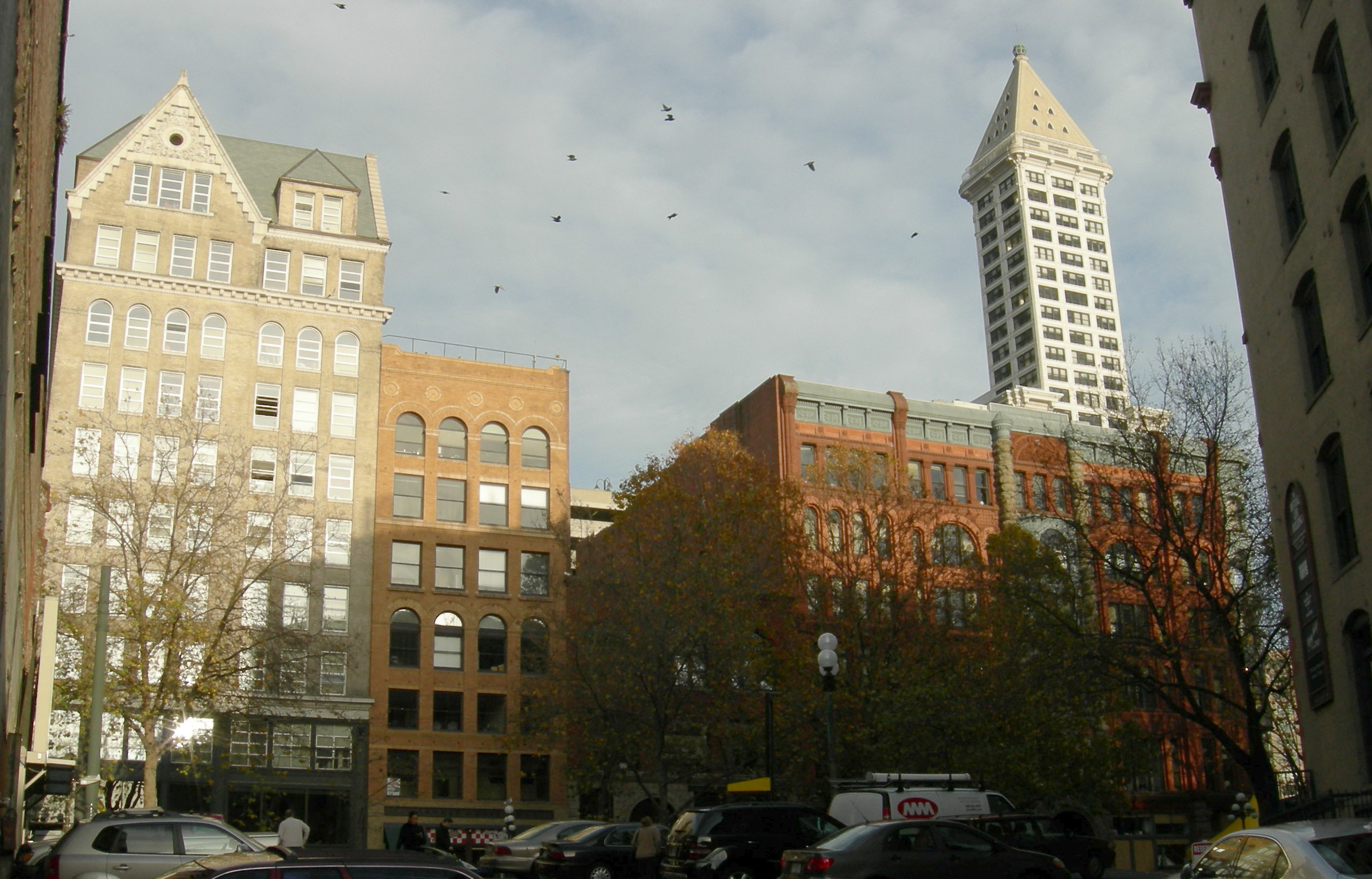
The heart of Pioneer Square

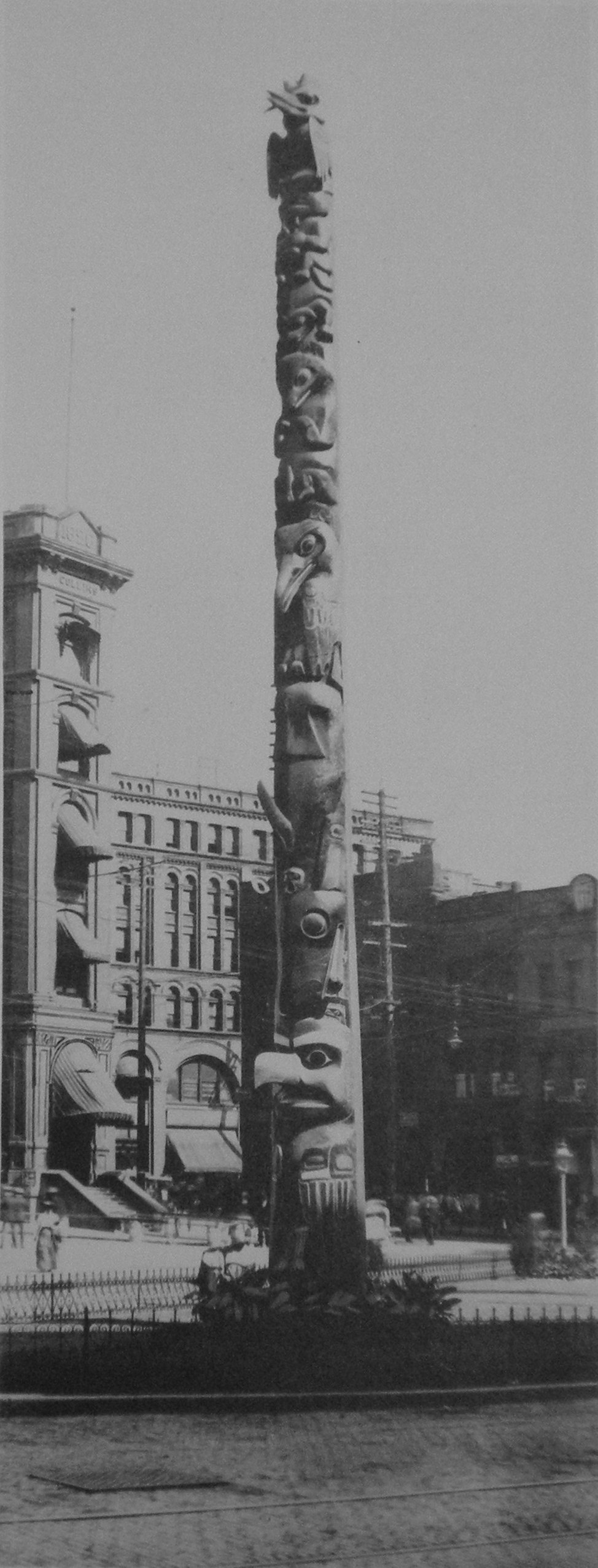
The original Pioneer Square Totem Pole in 1907

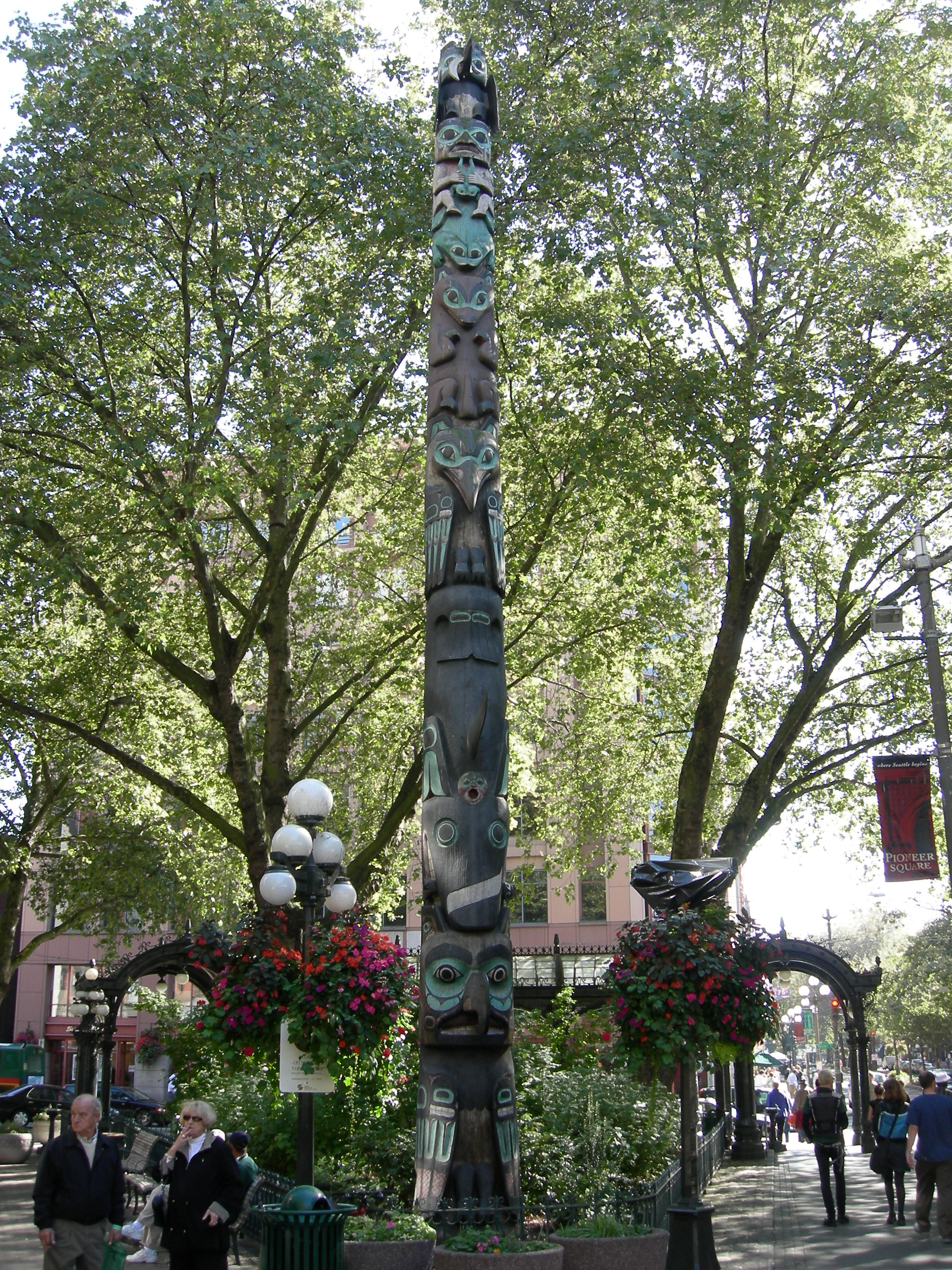
Pioneer Square Totem Pole, 2007

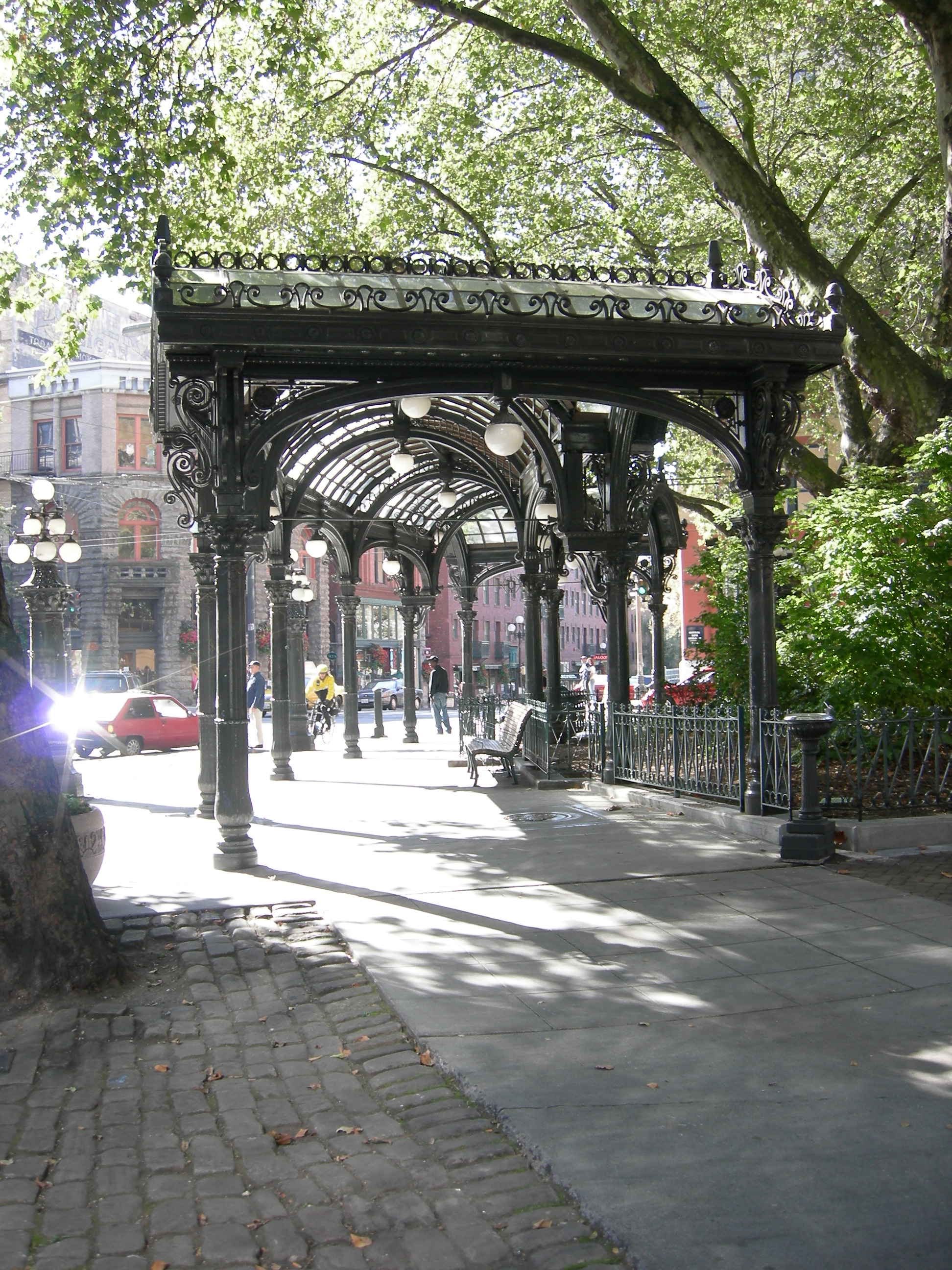
The reconstructed Pioneer Square pergola

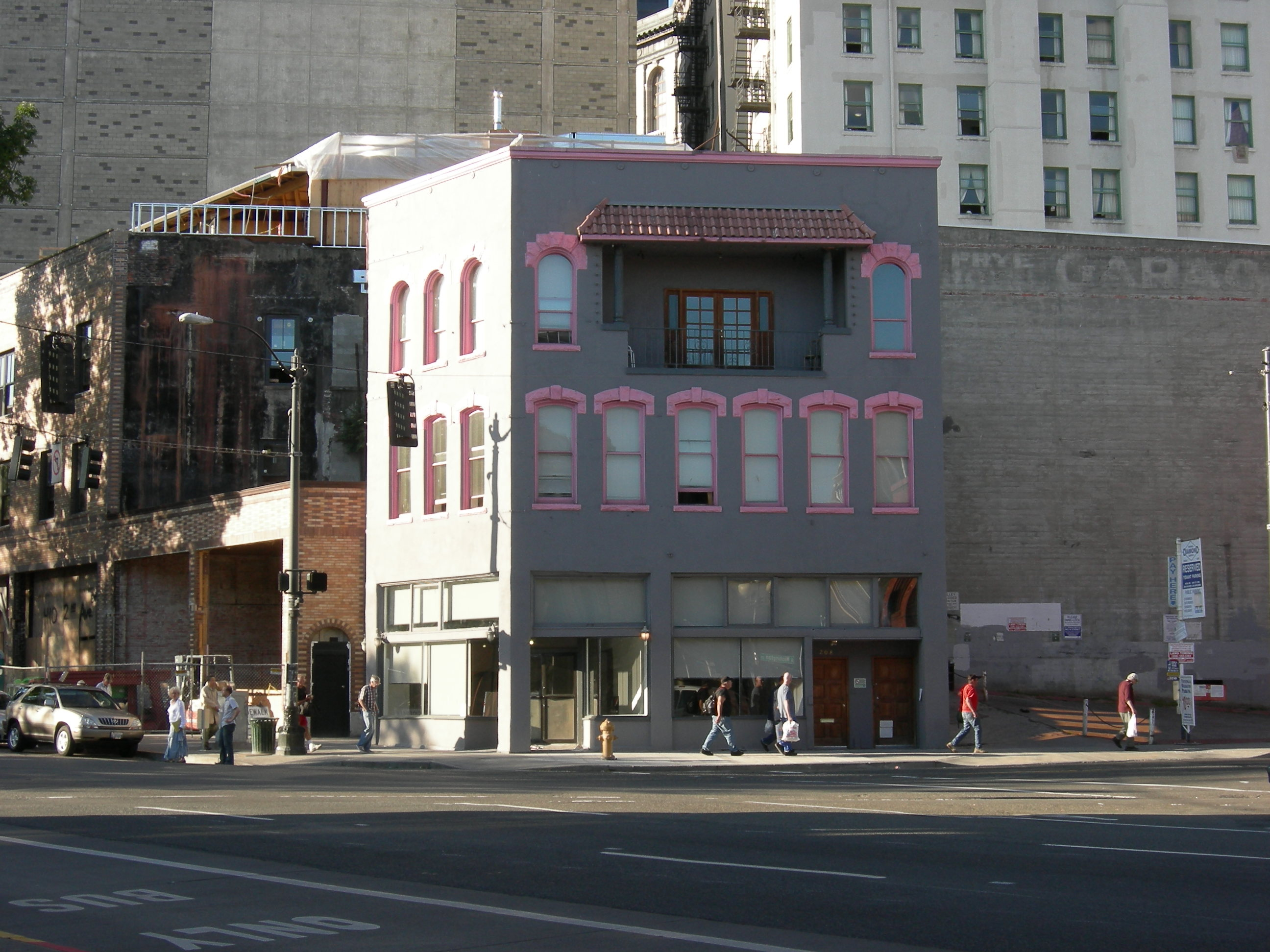
The Chin Gee Hee – Kon Yick Building, one of the last remnants of the historic Chinese presence in the neighborhood

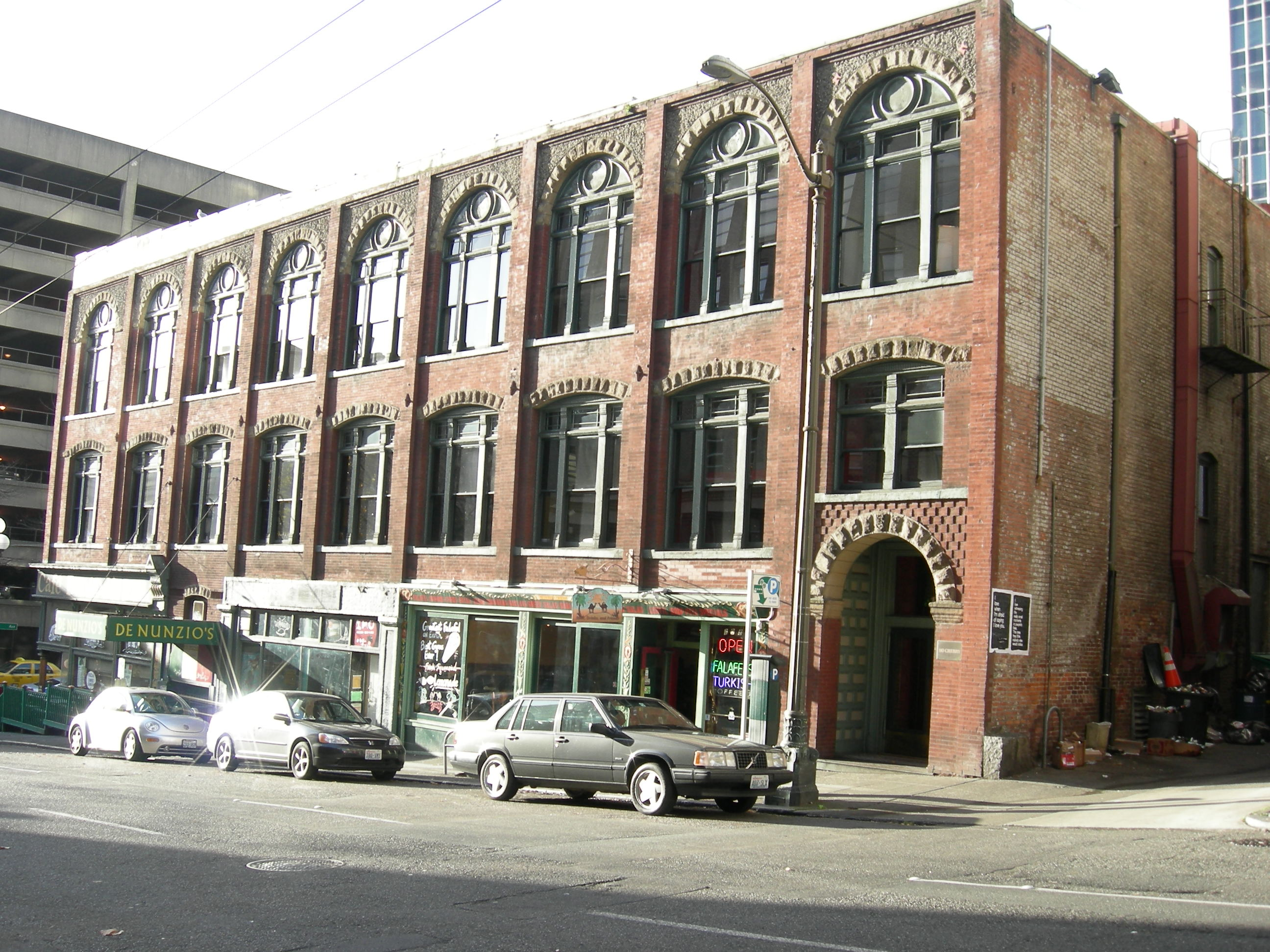
The Scheuerman Block is an example of the Victorian interpretations of the Romanesque Revival frequently applied to buildings erected shortly after the Great Seattle Fire

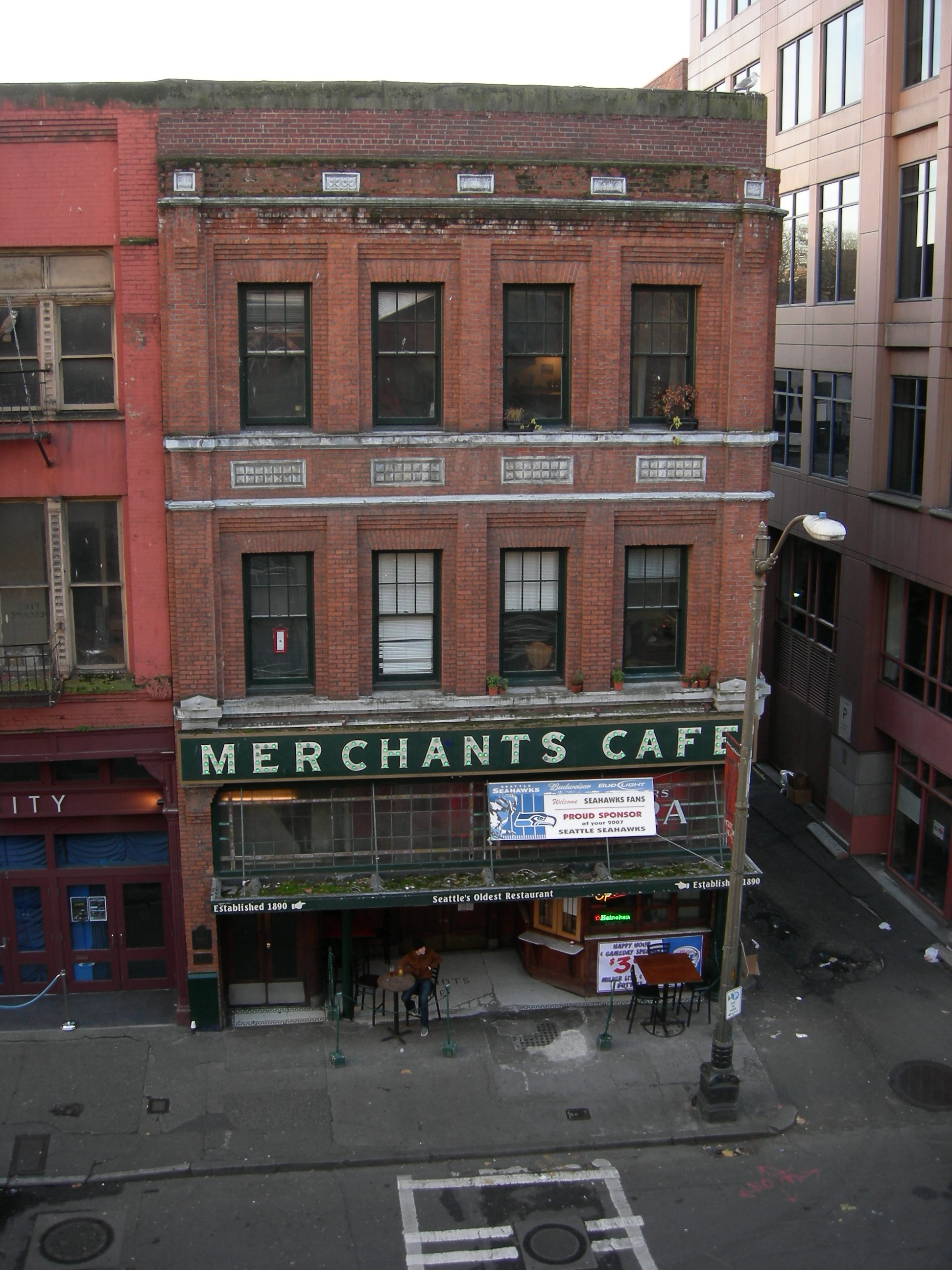
The Merchants Café, Seattle's oldest restaurant

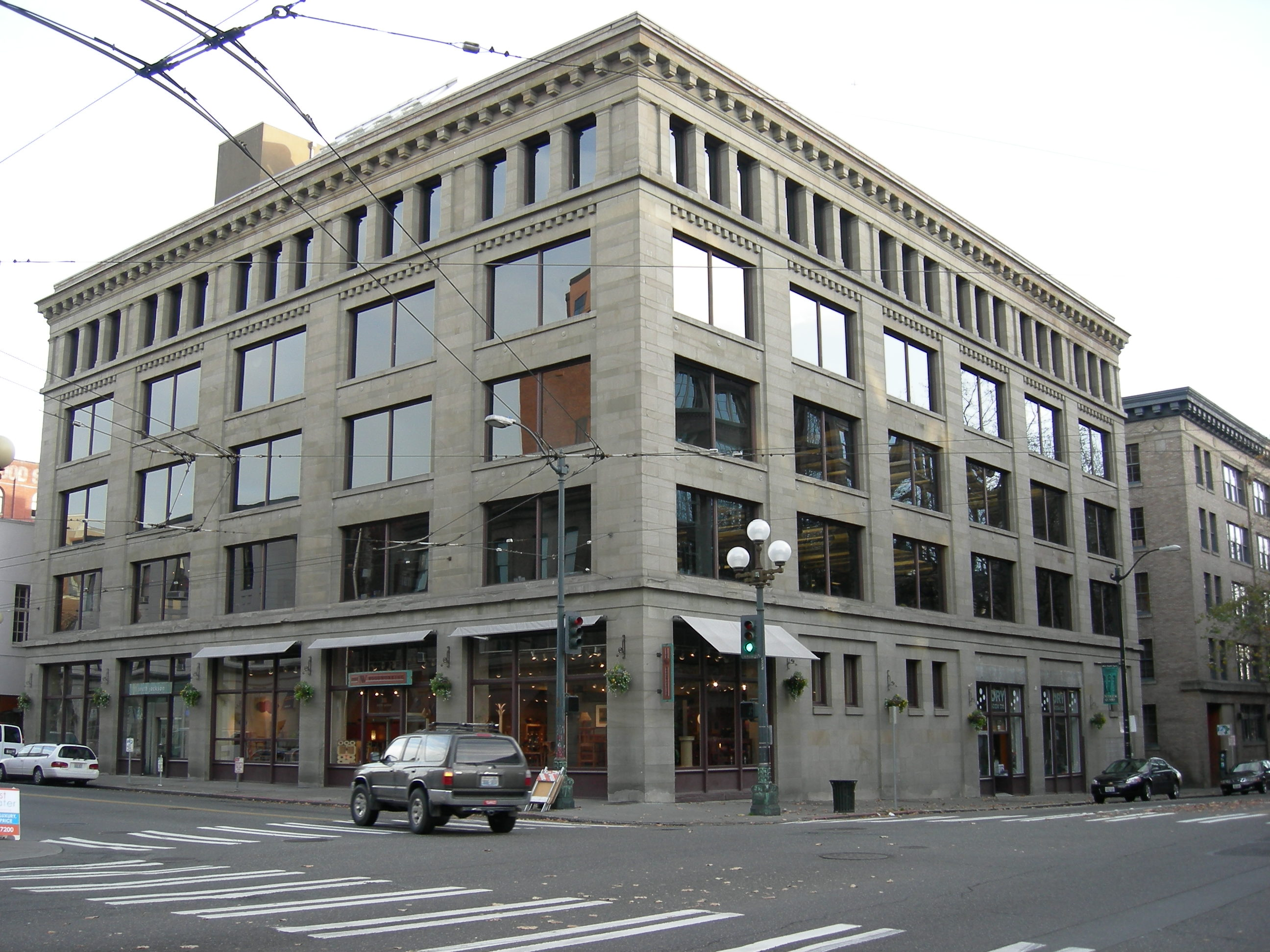
Heritage Building, a typical early 20th century commercial building

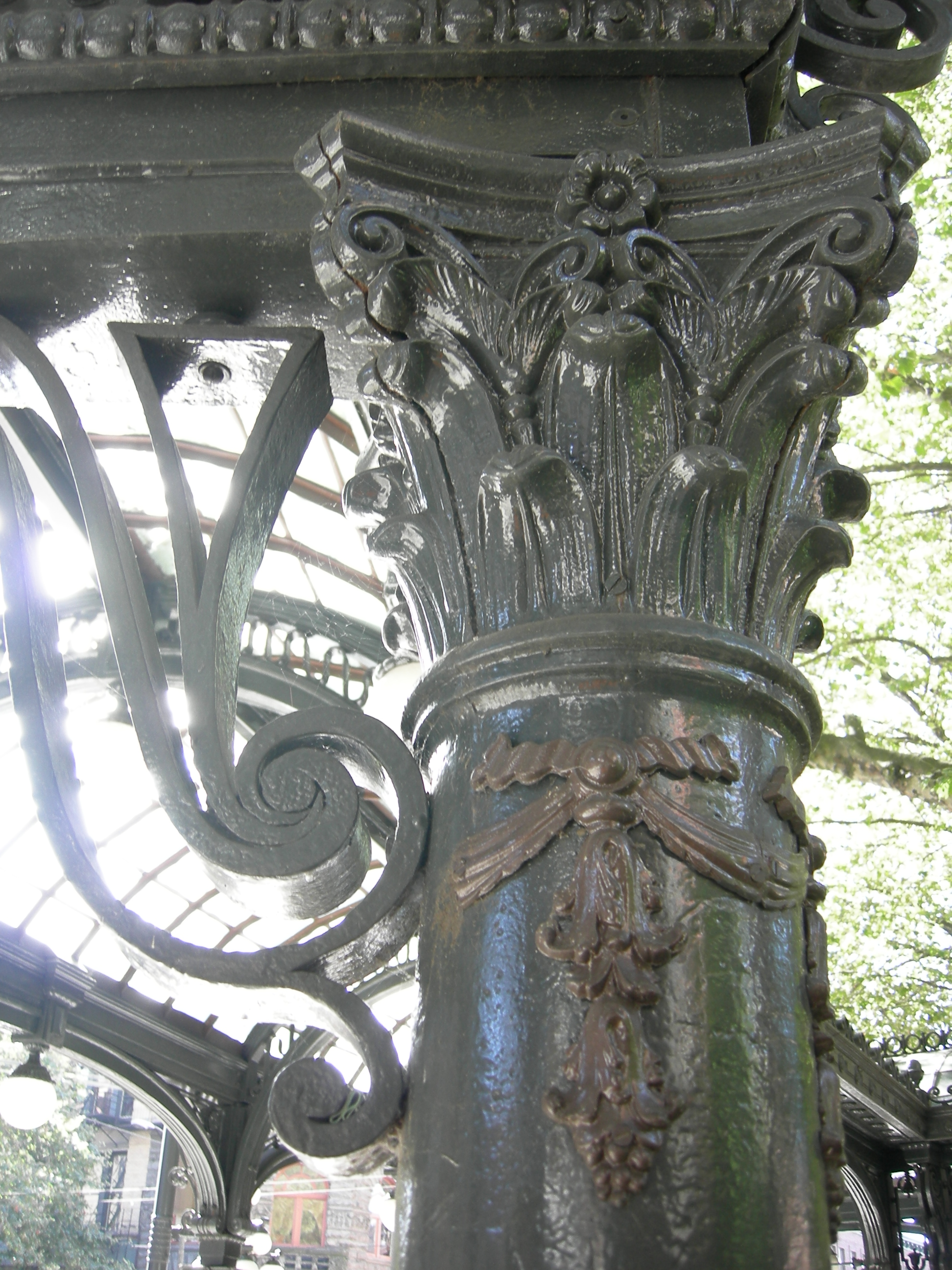
Cast iron pergola, detail

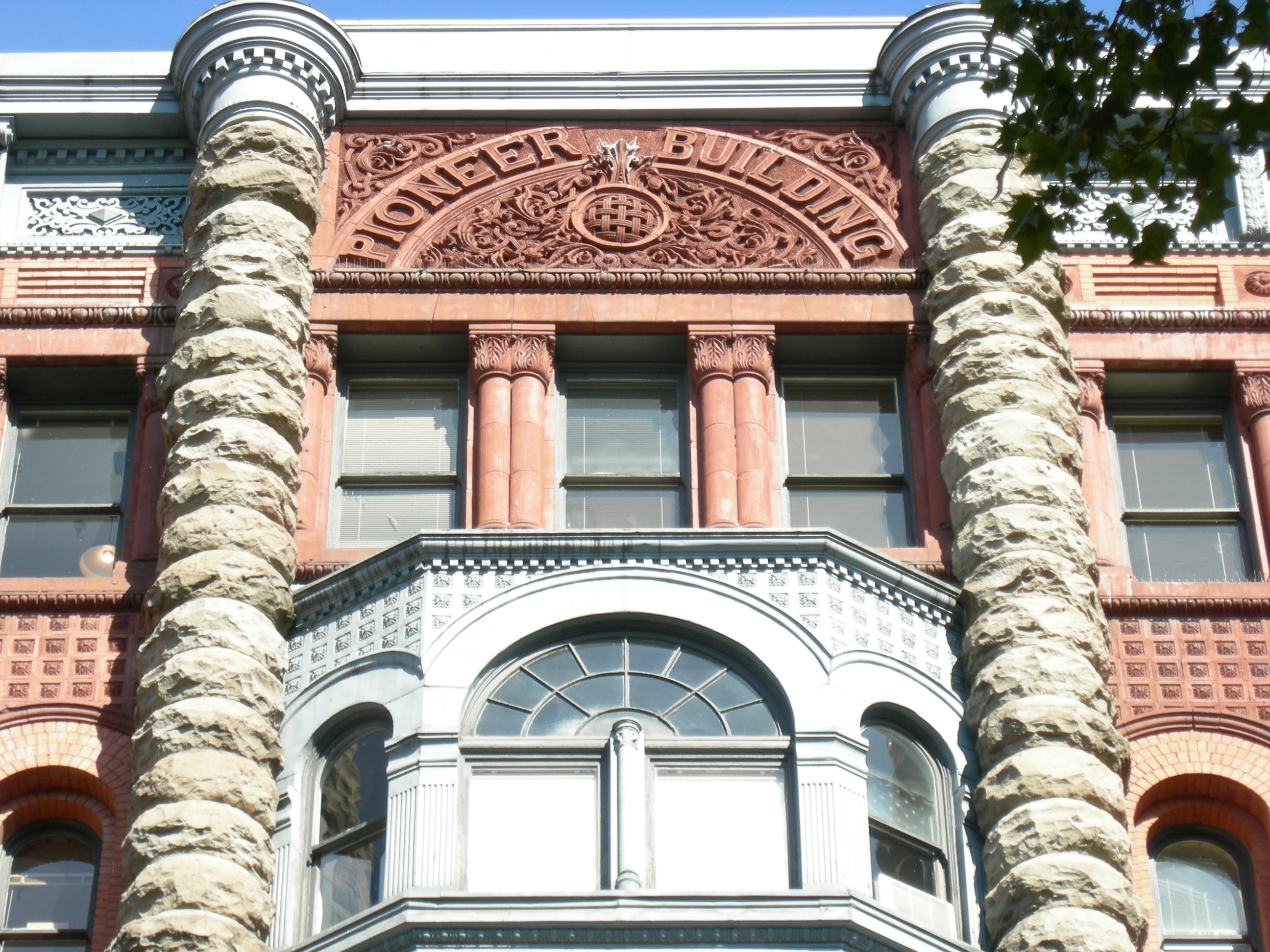
Pioneer Building, detail

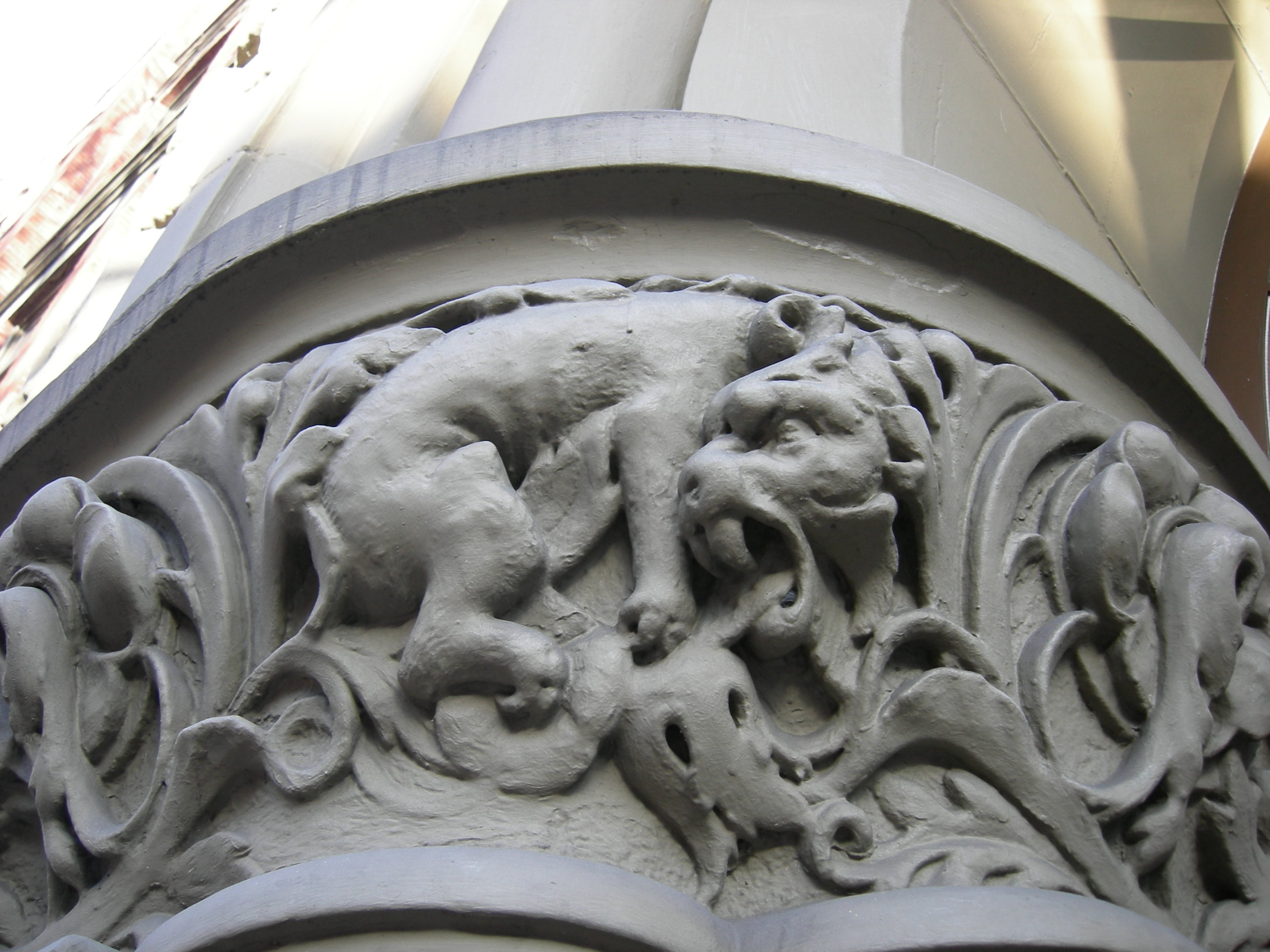
Stylized lion, entrance of Grand Central Hotel, Squire–Latimer Building

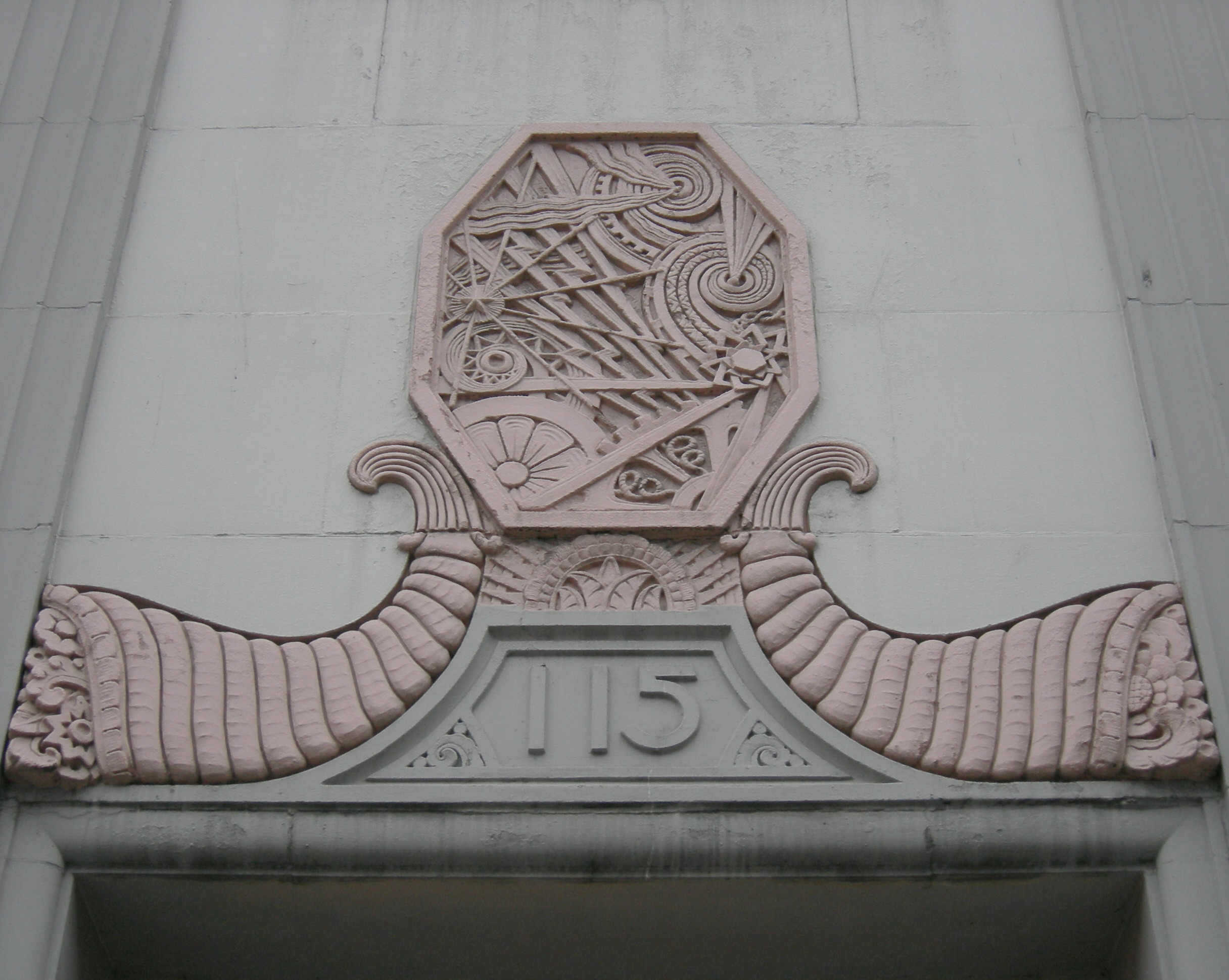
Fisher Building, detail

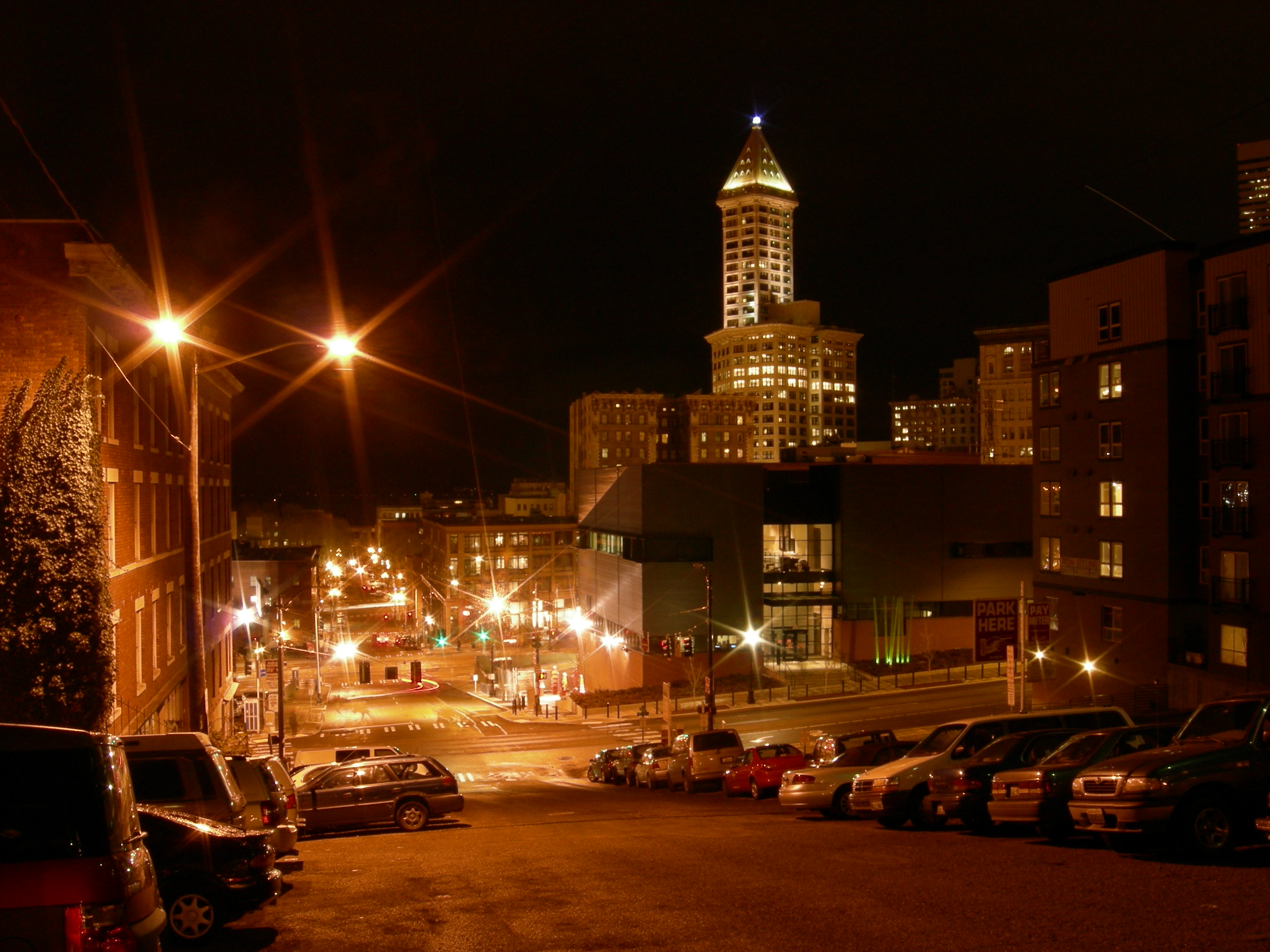
Looking west toward Pioneer Square at night

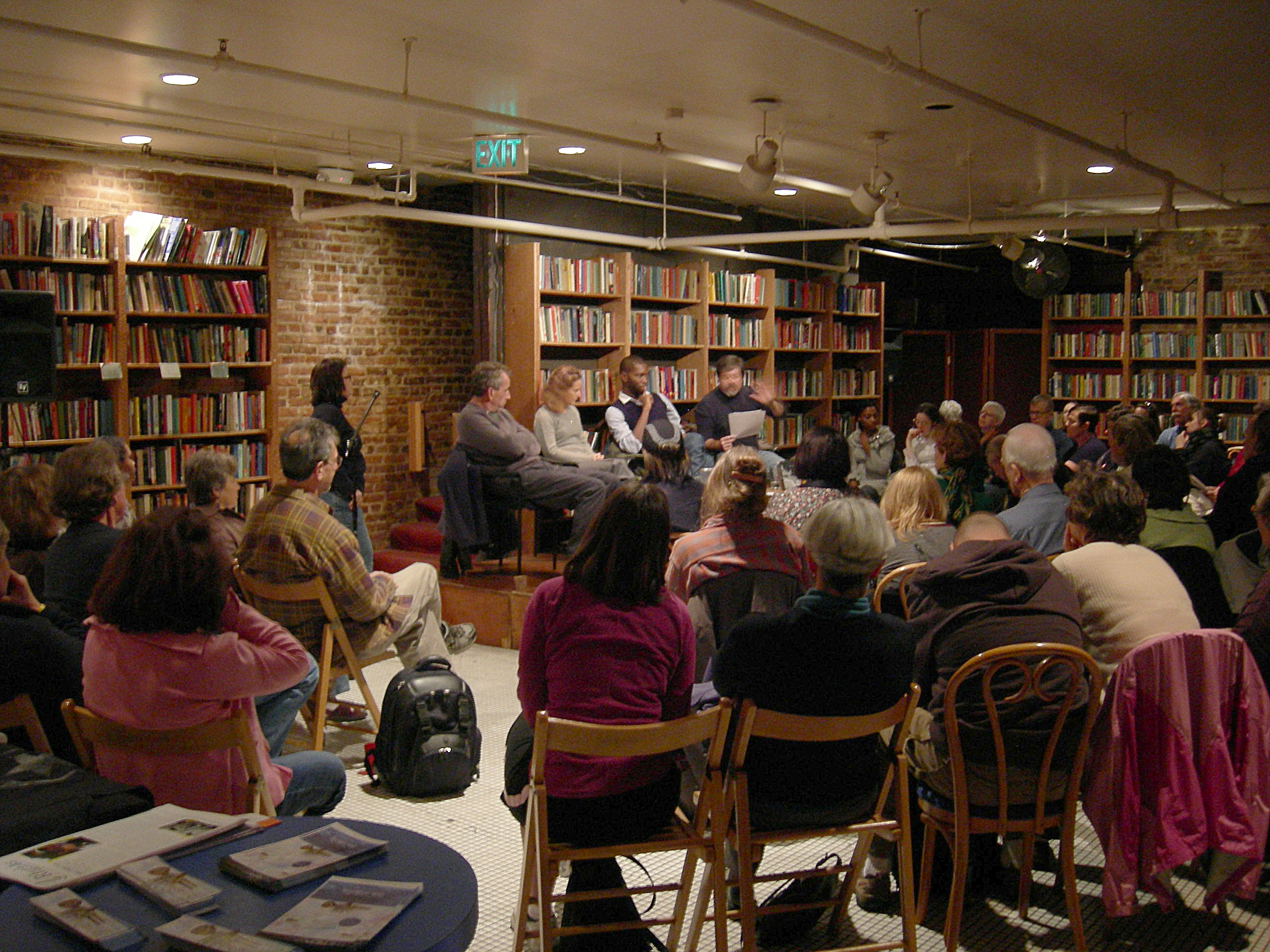
Author reading at Elliott Bay Books

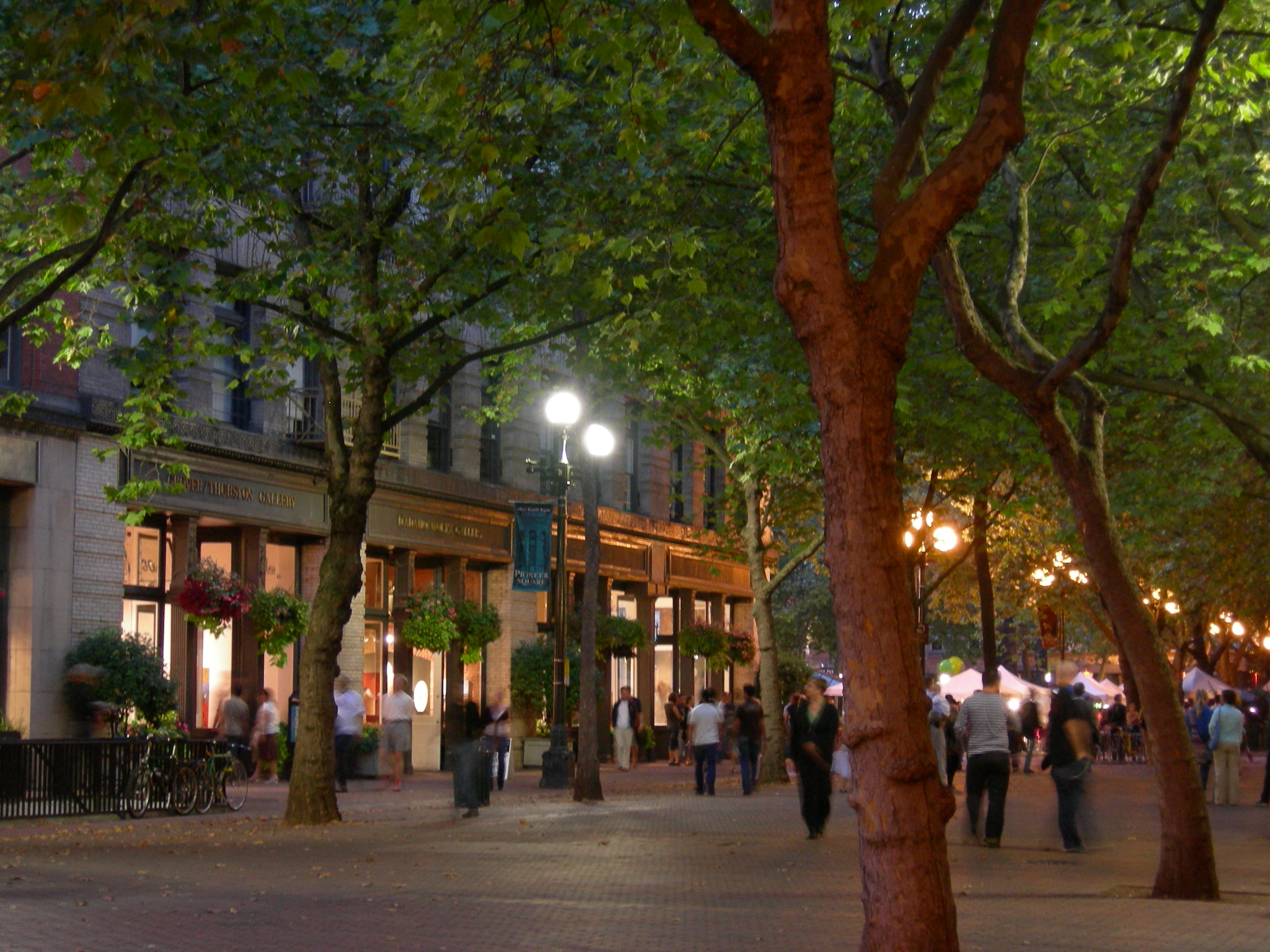
Occidental Mall on a "First Thursday": the evening when most Pioneer Square art galleries start their new shows

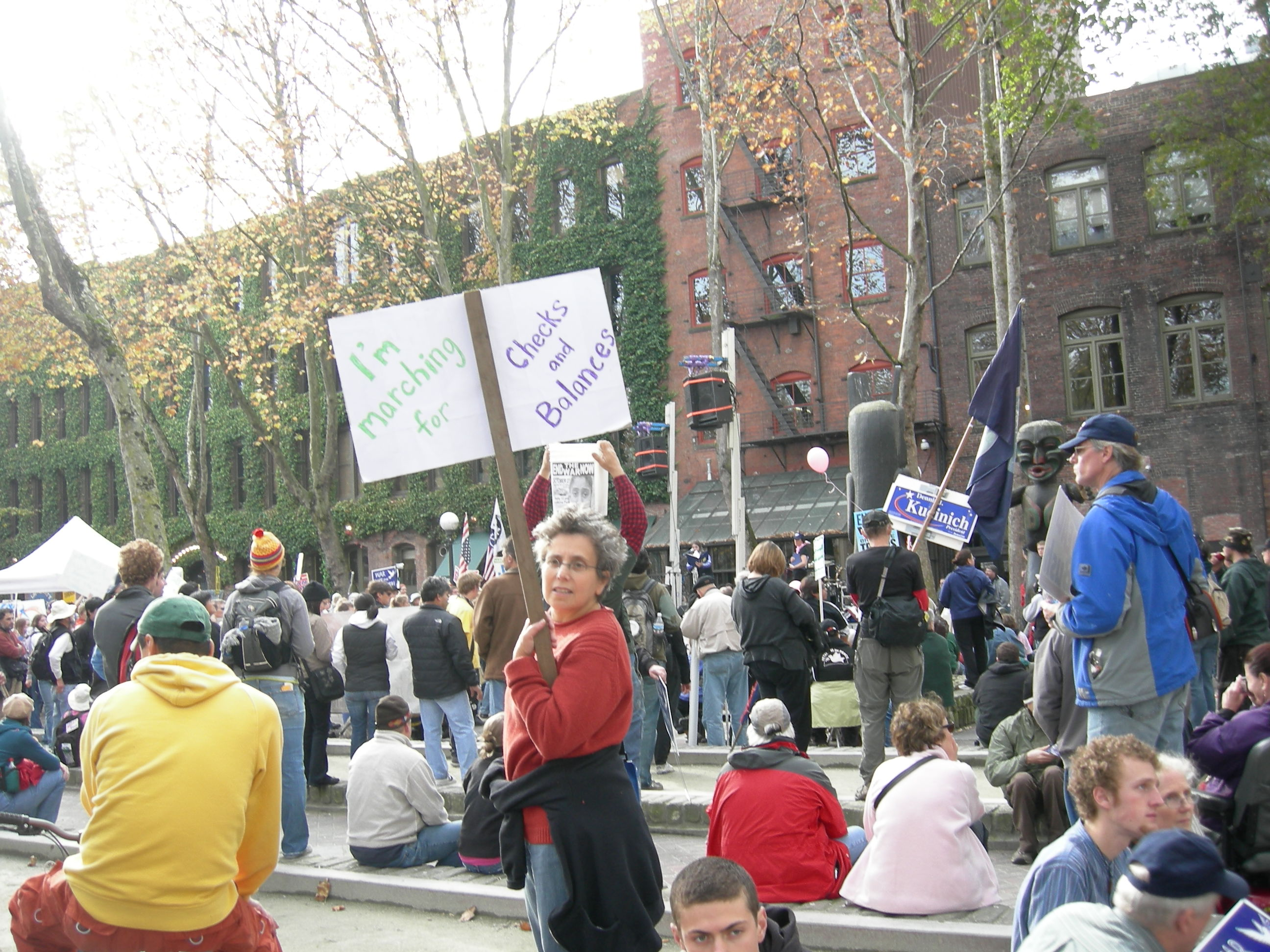
A political demonstration in Occidental Park

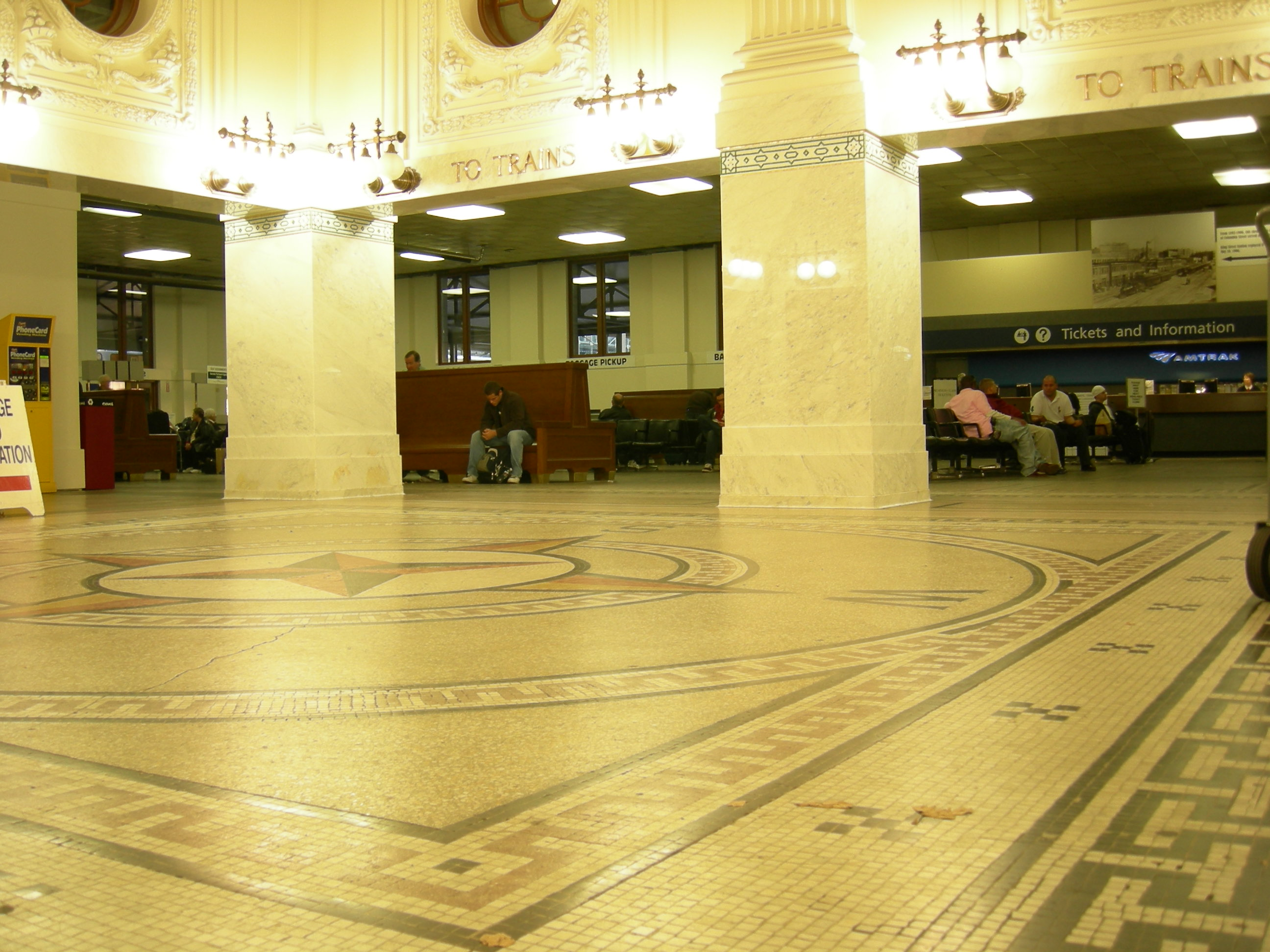
Waiting room, King Street Station

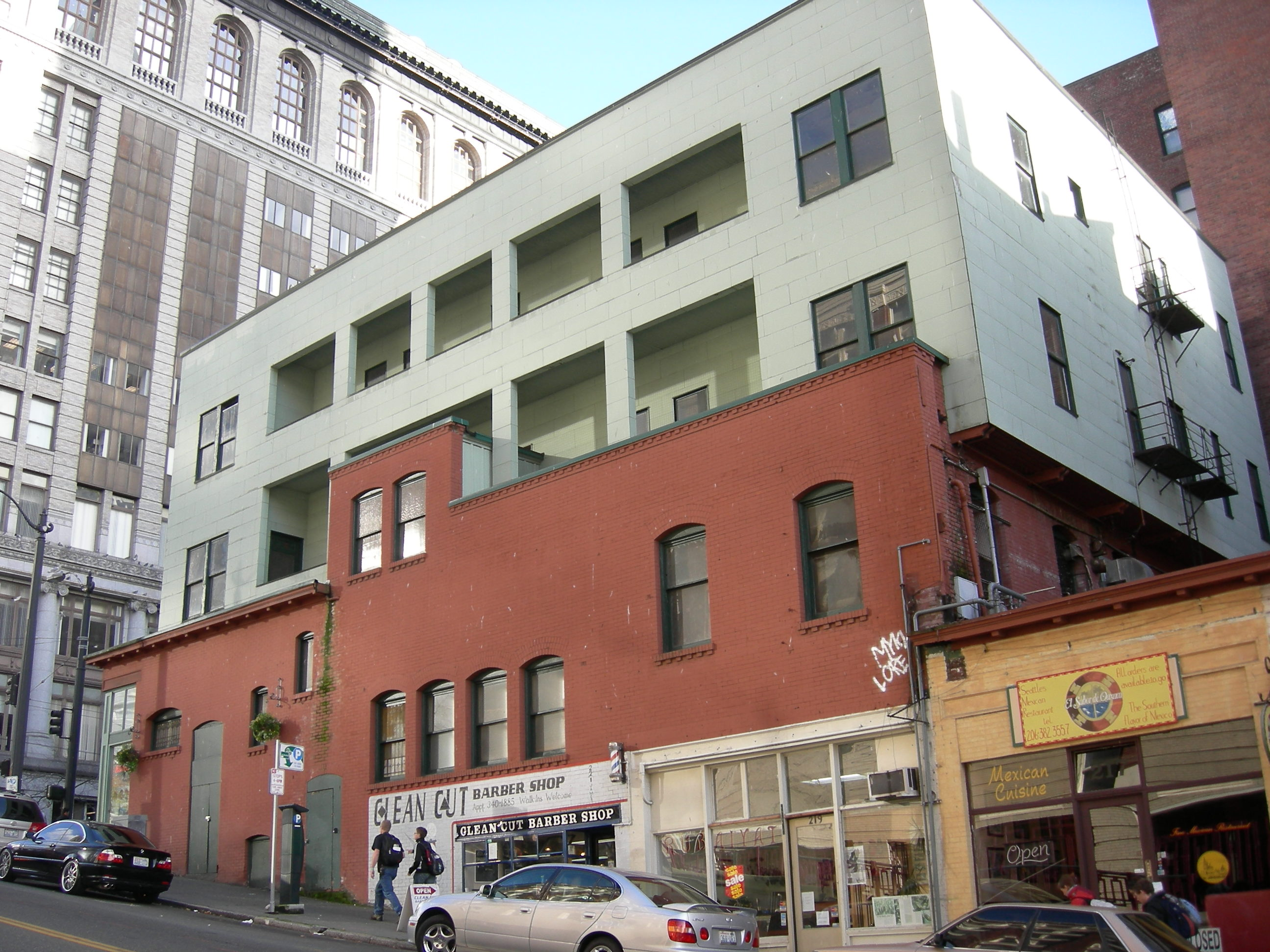
The upper portion of the Drexel Hotel Building is a wood-framed structure that predates the great fire, but it was re-clad with new materials after 1945

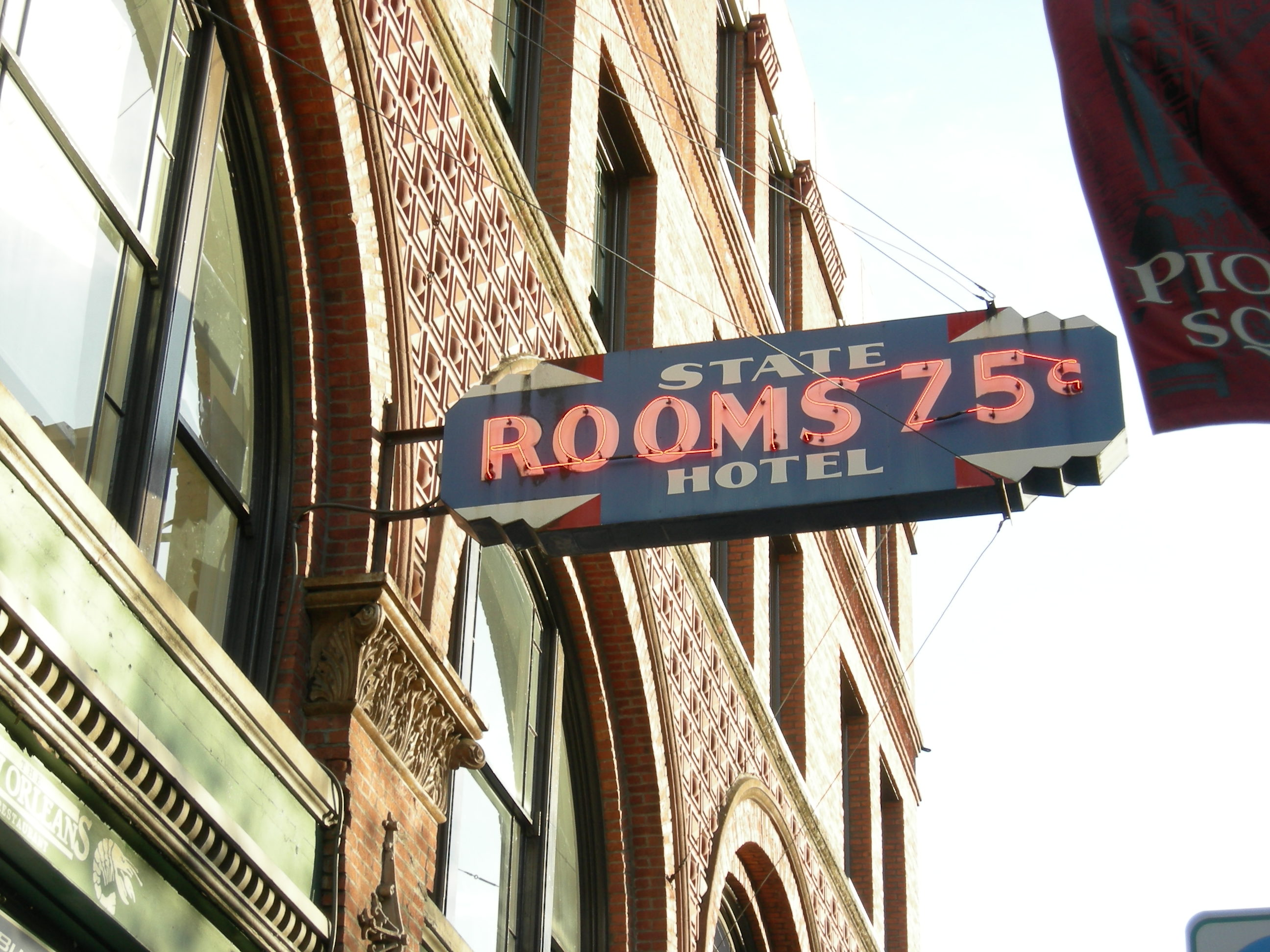
The State Hotel Building preserves a sign from the Skid Road era

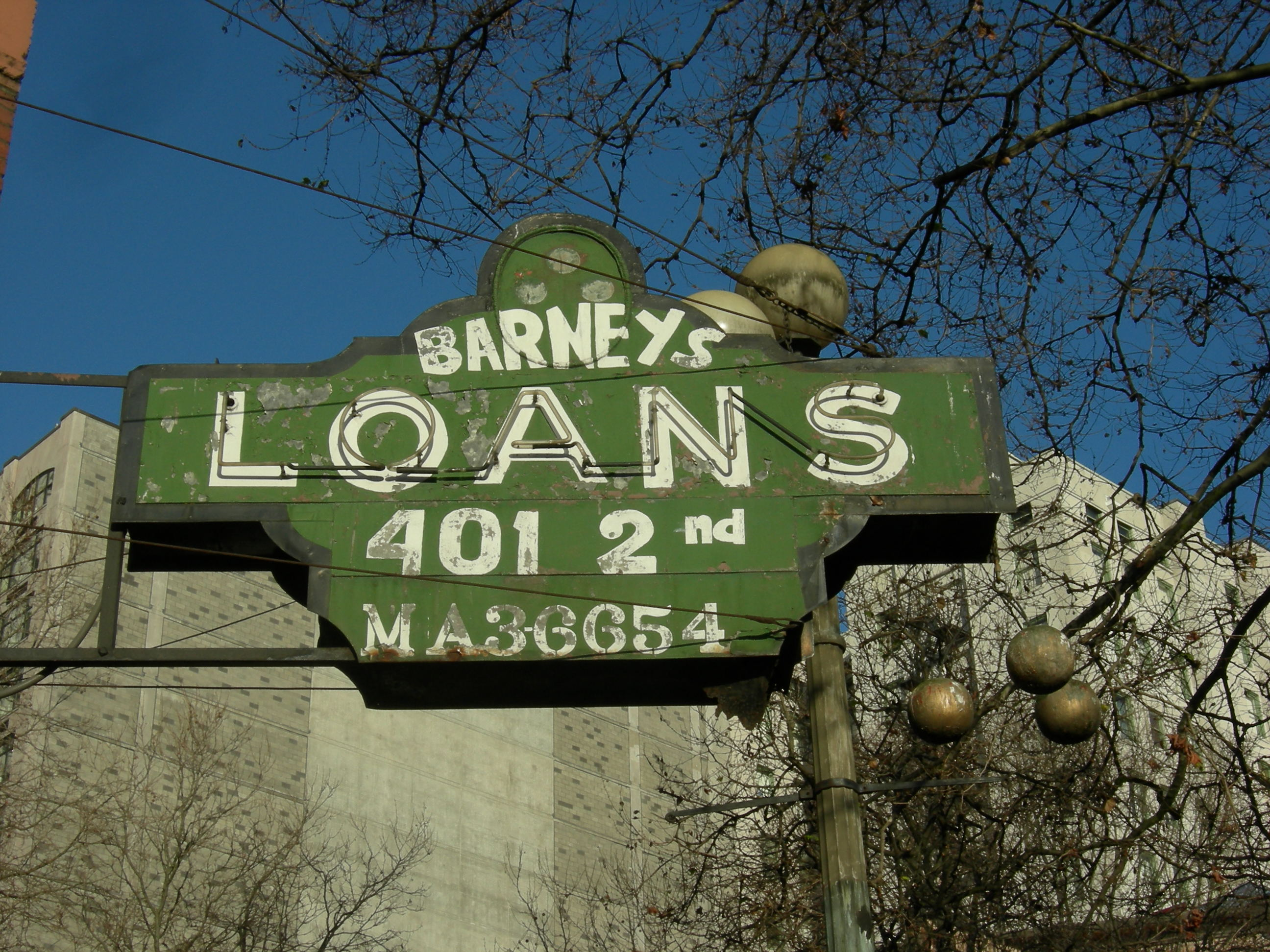
Barney's Loans continues as a pawn shop as of 2008

Occidental Mall at night in February 2011

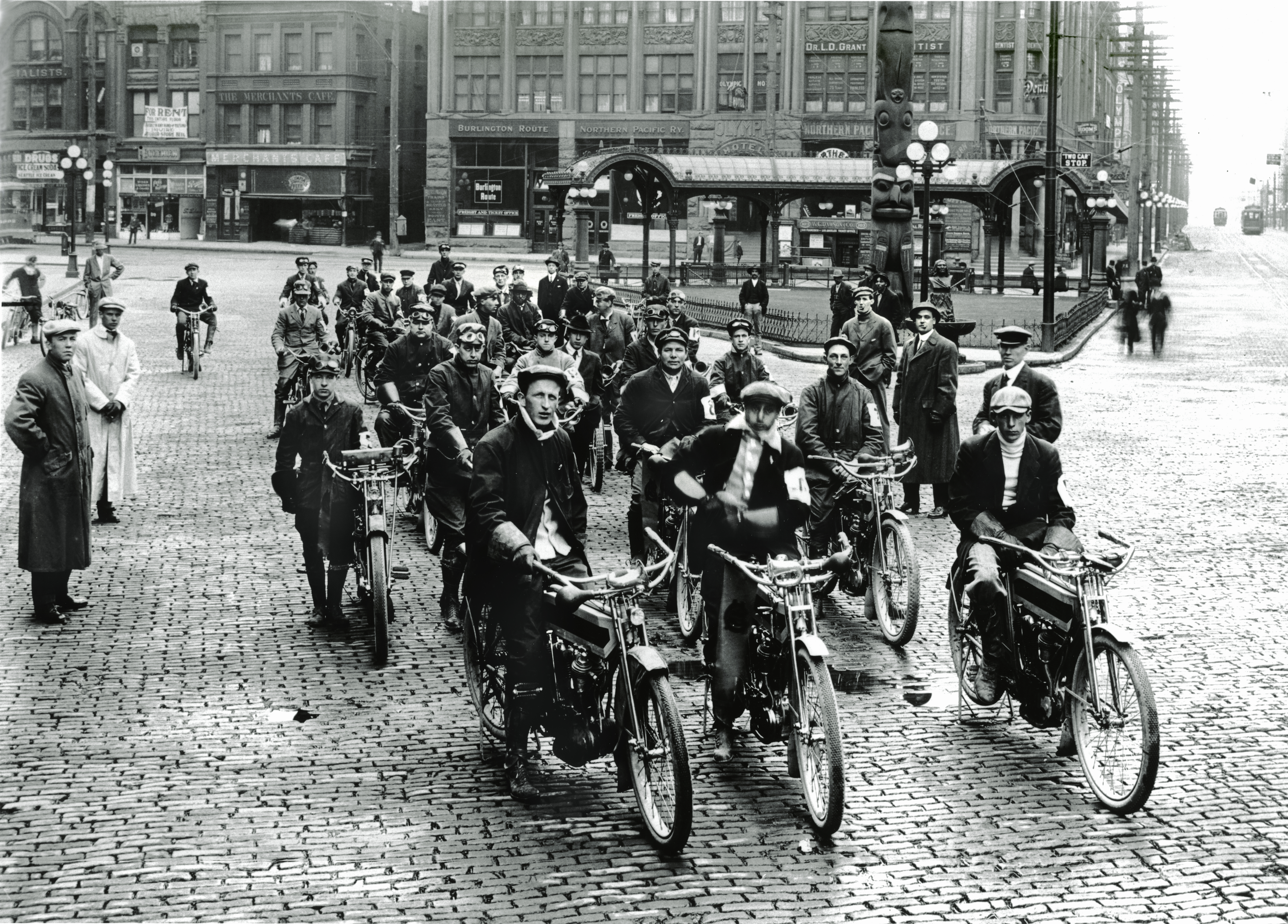
Motorcyclists in 1915.

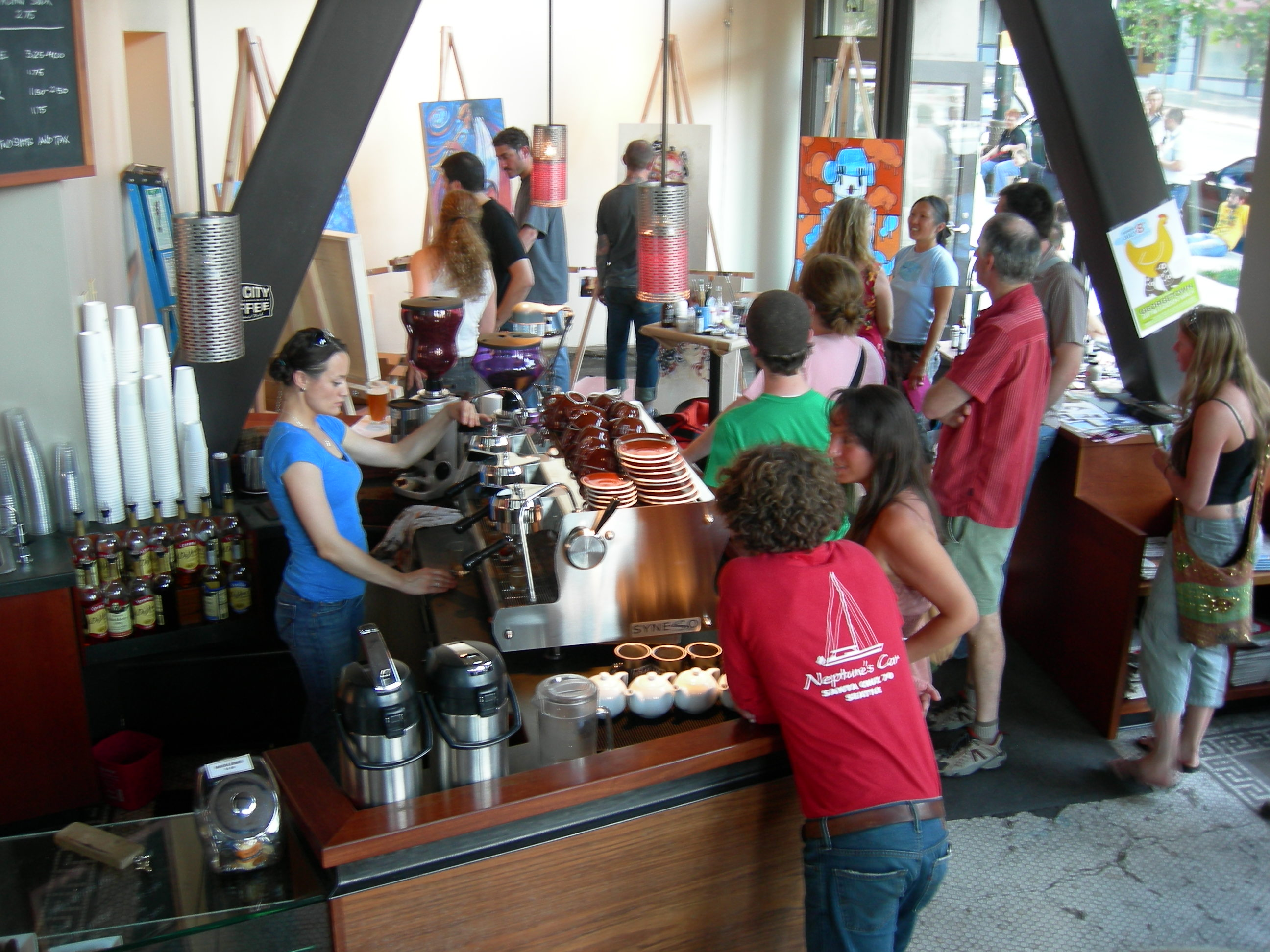
Artist gathering at All City Coffee, Pioneer Square in 2007

== See also ==
- Urbanization
