= Sinking Ship =

Parking garage in Seattle, Washington, U.S.

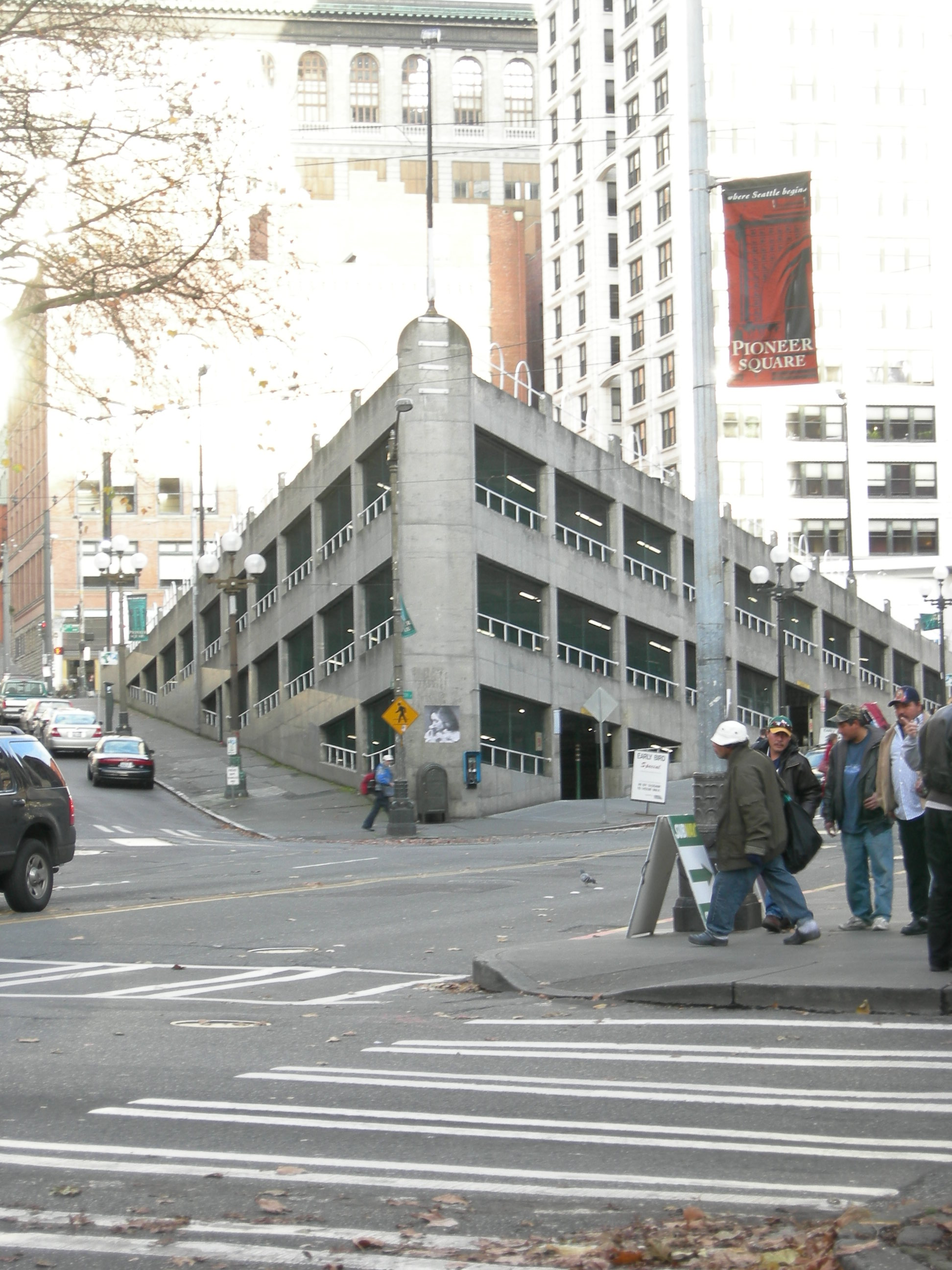
- Interactive map of the Sinking Ship area

General information
- Type: Parking garage
- Location: Seattle, Washington, U.S.
- Coordinates: 47°36′7″N 122°19′58″W
- Operator: Diamond Parking

Design and construction
- Architects: Gilbert H. Mandeville; Gudmund B. Berge
- Architecture firm: Seattle firm Mandeville and Berge

The Sinking Ship is a multi-story parking garage in Pioneer Square, Seattle, United States, bound by James Street to the north, Yesler Way to the south, and 2nd Avenue to the east, and just steps away from the Pioneer Building on the site of the former Occidental Hotels and Seattle Hotel. After the Seattle Hotel was demolished in 1961, the Sinking Ship was built as part of a neighborhood redesign.

It was designed by Gilbert H. Mandeville (engineer) and Gudmund B. Berge (architect) of the Seattle firm Mandeville and Berge, and built in 1965. They also designed the Logan Building and an addition to the First Presbyterian Church downtown, the Ballard branch of Seattle Public Library, and two buildings at the Seattle World's Fair in 1962 (the Alaska Building and the Transportation 21 Building).

A writer for HistoryLink described the Sinking Ship as "that skid road parking garage whose nihilistic construction depresses the flatiron block where James Street and Yesler Way meet at Pioneer Square."

It is owned by the Kubota–Fujii family, who had acquired the Seattle Hotel in 1941. Doris Kubota, from the same family, called the garage the "ugliest building in all of Seattle". It was also used during the 2001 Mardi Gras riot as a staging area for police and city officials. The Seattle Monorail Project proposed a monorail station at the site of the Sinking Ship, which it hoped to acquire through condemnation. The Kubota family disputed the condemnation lawsuit, stating their intention to build housing and retail at the site.

In 2019, the parking lot was named the "coolest parking lot" in the United States by the design publication Architizer and London-based Looking4.com. As of 2022, the garage is managed by Diamond Parking.
