= History of the LGBTQ community in Seattle =

Most recorded history of the LGBTQ community in Seattle begins with the Washington Sodomy Law of 1893. In the 1920s and 1930s there were several establishments in Seattle which were open to homosexuals. The Double Header, opened in 1934, may have been the oldest continuously operating gay bar in the United States until it closed in December 2015. On 19 November 1958, an injunction instructed the city police not to question customers of gay bars unless there was a "good cause" in connection with an actual investigation. In the 1960s, Seattle came to be seen as providing an accepting environment, and an increasing number of gay and lesbians were drawn to the city. In 1967 University of Washington's Professor Nick Heer founded the Dorian Society, the first group in Seattle to support LGBTQ rights.

Seattle's LGBTQ community is the second largest in the United States after San Francisco with 12.9% of the city identifying as LGBTQ. The Capitol Hill neighborhood in particular is considered by many the "center of gay life" in Seattle, with gay-friendly businesses and nightlife, and a resource center.

== Pre-Statehood ==
Some historians claim that businesswoman Eliza Hurd had a love affair with Sarah Yesler, who was married to sawmill owner Henry Yesler. Hurd's letters to Sarah Yesler passionately describe them sleeping and bathing together.^{:4,7}

At this time, the timber industry brought many workers to the region but not many women. Transient workers in the Pacific Northwest often organized relationships between men and youths along jock-punk lines, designating the jock as the penetrator during anal or intercrural sex. Historians believe that youths generally entered into these relationships as punks to obtain material protection and goods, and jocks used the relationships for sexual release. Seattle's upper classes viewed these relationships as against their moral values but did not label them as gay.

== Post-Statehood ==
The Washington Territory was admitted into statehood by the United States as Washington State on November 11, 1889, bringing Seattle with it.

The Washington Sodomy Law was adopted in 1893, and in the same year, a King County court sentenced Charles Wesley to seven years at hard labor for "intent to know" Eddie Kalberg, "a male person". Over the next two decades, about 60 people were prosecuted for sodomy in Seattle. However, this included many people prosecuted for a range of prohibited sexual behaviors, not just sex between people of the same sex. Most people prosecuted with detailed records were working-class people from the Pioneer Square area.^{:13} Although sodomy could be applied to people in heterosexual relationships, it was mostly used to punish men engaging in sexual acts with each other. The maximum punishment was twice as long as that for heterosexual rape.

Harry Allen was the first person in Seattle documented to perhaps be transgender. Allen worked various jobs designated for men and was well-known throughout the Pacific Northwest, and documented in The Seattle Times since 1901. Alice B. Toklas lived in Seattle with her family in the 1890s, attending the University of Washington. Hanna Banana also moved to Seattle in the 1890s following the Alaska Gold Rush, and might be called transgender today. A contemporary described her as a popular queen who lived in and out of drag and lived in Seattle for decades, sharing stories about her relationships with Seattle's transient workers.

In 1909, George Vanderveer and George Cotterill successfully pushed forward a state law that strictly banned abortion and public nudity, condemned common law marriages and the pursuit of sex outside of marriage, prohibited people from writing about sex crimes, and explicitly specified what behaviors the crime of sodomy covered.^{:28-30} This made Washington one of three states to specify what sodomy entailed, and it ensured that the definition would remain expansive. It included oral and anal sex, removed the need for prosecutors to prove that penetration had happened, and specified punishment by a maximum of ten years in jail.^{:29}

In 1912, Seattle and many other Pacific Northwest communities had a moral panic after the first news of the Portland vice scandal broke, when local media covered a gay subculture among white American middle-class men in their cities. Public officials and writers shared their shock at "respectable" men participating in same-sex sexual activity, because the public's previous understanding was that this was only an aspect of working-class and immigrant subcultures. During the 1910s, local authorities grew concerned about the large numbers of youths participating in the male sex trade in Seattle. The industry had grown large in Pioneer Square, patronized by the many visiting transient workers in the lumber, mining, and fishing industries.

In 1913, the local press wrote about Pearl Roberts, who had dressed as a boy while touring the United States and was now returning to Seattle. She was one of many women and people assigned female at birth who dressed or lived as men in the West, often for stated reasons of safety, opportunity, or freedom, but also for expressing gender and sexual identity.

=== Bars, cabarets, clubs, and dancefloors ===
In the 1920s and 1930s, early establishments open to homosexuals were concentrated in areas of ill repute. Pioneer Square, also known as "Skid Road" or "Fairyville," with its bars, clubs, and cabarets probably was the center of early public gay life in Seattle. The Casino, opened in 1930 on the corner of Washington Street and 2nd Avenue, was known as "the only place on the West Coast that was open and free for gay people", and where same-sex dancing was allowed. The Double Header above The Casino, opened in 1934, was possibly the oldest continuously operating gay bar in the United States until it closed at the end of December 2015. The Spinning Wheel on Union Street and 2nd Avenue, was a cabaret featuring female impersonators. Both were open to both gay and straight clientele during the 1930s. The Greyhound bus depot, Volunteer Park on Capitol Hill, and the restrooms in the University Plaza Hotel and at the University of Washington were also known as meeting spots for gay men.

Seattle's LGBTQ sex worker community during the Great Depression was later described by a community member called Vilma. Vilma said that Seattle's young prostitutes who were assigned male at birth identified as either queens or hustlers in the 1930s: in today's terms, queens likely included out gay and bisexual men and transgender women. Vilma recounted that queens traveled together between Seattle and San Francisco on railroad boxcars, staying in each city for several months at at a time. They gathered at The Casino while in Seattle. At the pool hall, Hanna Banana, a queen who had lived in Seattle for decades, mentored young queens and shared stories of her life and the city.

The Garden of Allah was the most popular homosexual Seattle cabaret in the 1940s and 1950s. Regular vaudeville and drag shows were held there with singers dressed in drag. It was a hotspot in the post war period with service-persons, but in the 1960s the military made most gay establishments in Seattle off-limits during the Lavender Scare.

By the 1960s, 90% of Seattle's gay bars were located in Pioneer Square. In the 1960s and 1970s new gay Seattle hotspots such as the Mocambo, the Golden Horseshoe and the Golden Crown opened. In the 1970s vaudeville had changed and Seattle began the trend of courts, public drag clubs "with 'emperors' and 'empresses' where "lip –synching would remove the need for singing talent and open the way to any man who could dance, quip, or even just costume. Performances would change, with ever-more flamboyant costuming, more energetic and choreographed dancing and even laser shows."

In the 1950s and 1960s, Seattle's dance clubs served as important points for the gay community to meet and strategize, which according to Gary Atkins, author of Gay Seattle. Stories of Exile and Belonging, may be likened to the African-Americans who used churches to organize during the civil rights movement.

During the 1950s, when anti-sodomy laws were still in effect in the United States, gay bars, clubs and bathhouses became scrutinized. Owners of such establishments would frequently bribe law enforcement to ensure their survival as well as prevent harassment of their mostly gay clientele and escape legal consequences themselves. Seattle city officials believed that the city was not doing enough to enforce laws discriminating against homosexuality and feared that eventually it would be as openly acceptable as in cities such as San Francisco. As a result of the political upheaval regarding Seattle gay bars, the Armed Forces Disciplinary Control Board sent fourteen gay establishments letters threatening to bar them from military personnel. In 1966, the Seattle police chief suggested restrictions on gay bars such as withholding their liquor licenses.

=== The Dorian Society ===
In 1965 a group of openly gay men were contacted by Rev. Mineo Katagiri to talk with religious leaders in the city. The first radio interview with openly gay men was broadcast on KRAB radio by members of that group. The Dorian Society was formed in 1967. The book Gay Seattle goes into detail about this group.

The Dorian Society founded in 1967 by Nick Heer, a professor at the University of Washington was the first group in Seattle to publicly support gay rights and which published a newsletter about current issues and events in the gay community. The name was a reference to the Doric Hellenic warriors of Ancient Greece who considered homosexuality glamorous and the society was modelled on New Zealand's Dorian Society. Their mission was to create a more respectable image of the Seattle homosexual. They also wanted the reform the Seattle sodomy laws. In response to their efforts a Seattle Times headline stated on September 21, 1966, Tolerant Reputation: Seattle homosexual problem reported to be 'out of hand.' This article stated the Seattle police wanted to suppress the LBGT community, partially by removing liquor licenses at gay bars. In May 1967 The Daily of the University of Washington did a series on the gay community, which for the first time represented the community in a more positive light. Much of this positivity had to with the vigilant PR and work of the Dorian Society.

== Post-Stonewall ==
The Stonewall riots on June 28, 1969 sparked the Gay Liberation movement at a national scale. Like communities across the U.S., the Seattle LGBTQ community advocated collectively for public acceptance and equal rights. The movement upheld same-sex sexuality as something to celebrate, not hide. It took many inspirations from the civil rights movement, including in how it described power and freedom.

LGBTQ people in Seattle began to create a number of support and activist organizations, including a chapter of the Gay Liberation Front and the Gay Women's Alliance. Many of these groups were defined by specific communities, either aligned with the gay liberation movement's focus on gay men or lesbian feminism's focus on lesbian women. This exclusivity was partly due to geographic shifts in Seattle's LGBTQ community, whose social core had begun to move away from the often-integrated LGBTQ venues in Pioneer Square. Many lesbians lived in the University District and Wallingford, while Renton Hill and Capitol Hill hosted communities of gay men.^{:158-159} Seattle's gay business community grew with the help of the gay liberation movement, but catered to white middle-class gay men. Not all organizations believed in exclusivity or separatism, and the Union of Sexual Minorities was particularly opposed, advocating for an LGBTQ coalition which was anti-racist and anti-imperialist.

On Renton Hill, the Seattle Counseling Service was established in 1969, Stonewall Recovery was created in 1971, and Robert Sirico founded the Metropolitan Community Church of Seattle in 1972. In 1974, Marsha Botzer created a trans support group within the Seattle Counseling Service, and it evolved into the Ingersoll Gender Center by 1979. It was the first U.S. center for trans people, and provided a community center for trans and gender-questioning people, helping fund-raise for gender-affirming surgeries and hosting support groups.

Black and White Men Together, later named Men of All Colors and Cultures Together, formed in the late 1970s to combat racism in Seattle's gay community. Seattle's Gay Community Center later moved into the Seattle Urban League's Central District building.

In 1979, the Seattle Men's Chorus began. Congregation Tikvah Chadashah began in 1980, as Washington's first gay and lesbian synagogue. Eventually the synagogue explicitly made their LGBTQ members visible, and described themselves as a congregation "where all are welcome".

=== Legal history ===
==== Singer v. Hara ====
On September 20, 1971, John Singer, later known as Faygele ben Miriam, and fellow activist Paul Barwick applied for a marriage license at the King County Administration Building in Seattle, not being keen on actually getting married but wanting "to make a point about having the same rights as heterosexuals." Their request was refused by then-county auditor (later County Assessor) Lloyd Hara. They were among the first same-sex couples in the United States to apply for a marriage license, causing a flurry of media coverage and leading to a lawsuit, Singer v. Hara, which ended in 1974 with a unanimous rejection by the Washington State Court of Appeals.

==== Legislation ====
Throughout the 1970s, LGBTQ organizations advocated for more inclusive anti-discrimination laws and blocked initiatives that would have eroded their protections. In the early 1970s, gay rights activists convinced Seattle City Council member Jeanette Williams to publicly support their efforts. In 1973 they achieved a Seattle city ordinance prohibiting employment discrimination on the basis of sexual orientation. A 1975 ordinance blocking housing discrimination by sexual orientation followed.

In 1978, the group Save Our Moral Ethics (SOME), led by Seattle police officers David Estes and Dennis Falk, pushed to overturn these anti-discrimination protections via Initiative 13. They argued that gay people were not minorities like women or certain racial or ethnic groups, and thus didn't need legal protections. SOME arose during a national movement to revoke protections for LGBTQ people following Anita Bryant's activism in Florida. Bryant's organization, Protect America's Children, helped fund SOME. Organizations like Women Against Thirteen, the Seattle Committee against Thirteen, and the Citizens to Retain Fair Employment successfully mobilized against the initiative, with Seattle voters rejecting it by a wide margin. Beyond supporting LGBTQ people in Seattle, the result inspired the national LGBTQ community. Hands Off Washington successfully organized against further discriminatory legislation in the 1990s by building coalitions across marginalized people but failed to pass more protections against discrimination.

As Seattle's transgender community coalesced with the help of the Ingersoll Gender Center, the community took on political activism and advocated for anti-discrimination laws to cover gender identity and expression. In 1986, Seattle updated its nondiscrimination ordinances to do just that. It was the sixth U.S. city to establish these protections. King County followed suit in 2006, adding gender identity to the definition of sexual minorities, which were a protected class for the county's nondiscrimination laws. That year, Washington State added sexual minorities as a protected class to its statewide anti-discrimination laws, and gender identity was included in their definition.

In 1994, prompted by the Mayor's Lesbian and Gay Task Force, Seattle established that the benefits provided by domestic partnerships for municipal employees should be equal to those for spouses. In 1995, King County followed suit for county employees, and in 2003, a county ordinance required that any company contracting with the county provide equal benefits for marriages and domestic partnerships.

=== Pride Week ===
From June 24 to June 30, 1974, Seattle's lesbians and gays celebrated the city's first Gay Pride Week. It was the first event in the region in which the gay community as a whole came out of its collective closet. On June 28, 1974, the Gay Community Center at 1726 16th Avenue E held a grand opening. On June 29, 1974, a Saturday, the Seattle Post-Intelligencer reported that about 200 attended a picnic at Occidental Park in Pioneer Square. Entertainment included music and a "Gayrilla theater." Banners from the stage read "Proud to be lesbian, Proud to be gay." In the afternoon, activities moved to Volunteer Park and included roller-skating and a sing along at the top of the Volunteer Park Water Tower. That evening, a street dance was held in Occidental Park that featured music by Blue Moon and Sue Isaacs. On June 30, 1974, Gay Pride Week concluded with a "Gay-In" at the Seattle Center that featured "zany dress, general frivolity, carousing and a circle dance around the main International fountain."

In 1977, the mayor of Seattle, Wes Uhlman, declared Gay Pride Week as an official city event. A year later, Gay Pride was renamed to Lesbian Gay Pride. In 1992, Princess LaRouge and ben e. factory advocated that Pride should be more inclusive of trans and bisexual people. They organized with other activists to convince the Pride organizers, Freedom Day Committee, to explicitly welcome trans and bisexual people in the event and raise the visibility of the broader LGBTQ community. The activism succeeded, and Pride's new official name became "The 1992 Lesbian/Gay/Bisexual/Transgender March/Parade and Freedom Rally in Seattle". This made Seattle the first city to explicitly include the trans community in Pride. Many in the gay rights movement protested the change with transphobic comments, often reflecting the hierarchy of the gay rights movement that tended to prioritize gay white men and their respectability. After a petition demanded the name be changed back, followed by debating letters published in the Seattle Gay News, multiple community forums, and bar advocacy, resentment subsided and the name remained.

In 1995, a new transgender rights organization called The T People created the first Transgender Pride party and demonstration in Seattle. Slogan: "MAXIMUM FUN & MAXIMUM FREEDOM for people of all genders or no gender at all." Individual volunteers secured permits, assembled local Trans political speakers and performers of music, poetry, and standup comedy. The MC, wearing a black fishnet bare midriff top and leather motorcycle jacket ripped the current edition of alternative newspaper The Stranger in half, deriding the cover story which provocatively asked if the Queer identity had, with social improvement, become obsolete. The gathering of about 200 people took place on a rainy June day across the street from Seattle Central Community College on Broadway, atop the Capitol Hill neighborhood. This event distinguished itself with an explicit anti-capitalist, anti-imperialist, and eco-feminist political call to action. An accompanying essay titled "Shades of Gray & Sunlight" ran in the official Pride guide.

In 1984, around 1,000 people paraded down Broadway, with an estimated 10,000 people listening to speakers at the Volunteer Park amphitheater. An organizer estimated 1989's parade had 20,000 marchers, and was Seattle's second-biggest parade, after the Seafair Torchlight parade. The parade attracted around 50,000 people in 1998, including 124 organizations. By 2002, police and organizers estimated the event had grown to 100,000 people, and by 2005, there were 150,000 attendees. In 2006, it split into a Saturday Capitol Hill community parade and a Sunday public march. By 2016, the downtown Pride Parade had an estimated 400,000 attendees.

=== HIV/AIDS epidemic ===
AIDS vigil at Seattle Central Community College south lawn, 1993

In the beginning of the AIDS epidemic there was a lot of denial that Seattle would get hit by the AIDS virus, but the community quickly organized. Many activist say now that Seattle's gay community has one of the strongest HIV/AIDS networks.

The first person to publicly be diagnosed with AIDS in Seattle was James Flanigan. This diagnosis became somewhat of a wake up call for the rest of the gay community. In October 1983 men were writing the Seattle Gay News telling the community to wake up and start to protect themselves. By 2000, 3,500 people in Seattle had died because of AIDS, including many leaders and activists in the gay community.

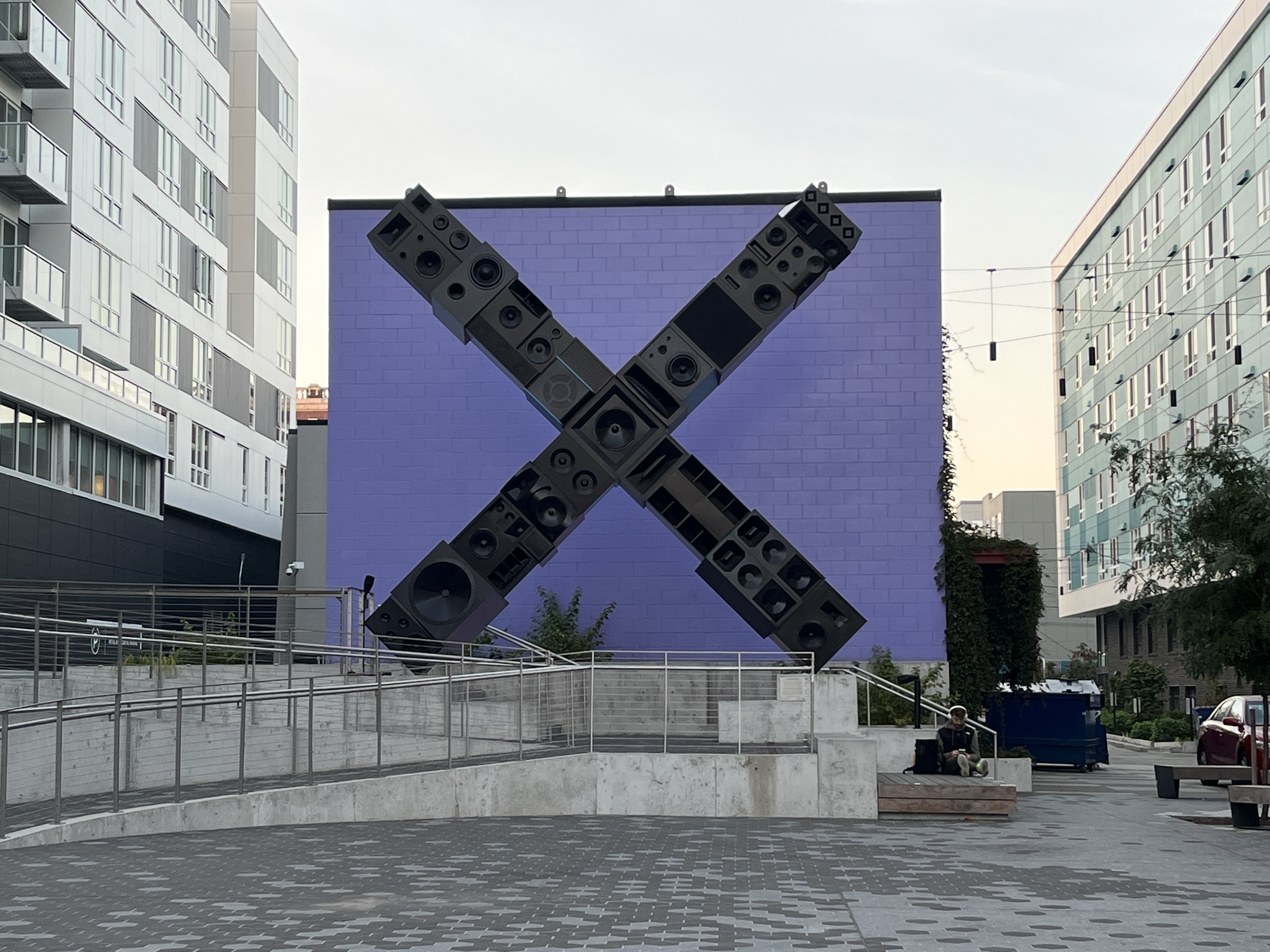
A two-story tall sculpture titled andimgonnamisseverybody stands in the Aids Memorial Pathway. The sculpture shows powerful speakers but does not make any noise, representing the voices and music lost to AIDS

As the AIDS crisis grew, many organizations formed in Seattle to fight the disease, care for AIDS patients, raise money for medical research, and protest the stigmas and lack of government intervention. In 1983 and 1984 the Chicken Soup Brigade was created by Josh Joshua. Chicken Soup became the backbone of the gay community with groups of volunteers cooking and caring for those who were ill with HIV. In 1983 (possibly 1982) the Northwest AIDS Foundation was founded to help the local community deal with the epidemic. By 1986 they had offices open at 619 3rd Avenue. The Northwest AIDS Foundation raised money for those living with AIDS, helped people claim federal disability benefits like SSI and SSDI, and ran safe-sex education campaigns for gay men, including Seattle's first ever safe-sex campaign: "Rules of the Road". In 1987 Lifelong AIDS Alliance created the "Jars in Bars" program that allows community volunteers to engage in education outreach regarding AIDS and enables patrons of Capitol Hill bars to donate to their cause. After the Second National March on Washington for Lesbian and Gay Rights in October 1987, Seattle formed a chapter of ACT UP. Seattle's ACT UP chapter organized protests and worked to fund AIDS care and research.

During the 1980s, many in the Seattle LGBTQ community came together to combat the AIDS crisis. The gender divisions of the 1970s eroded as many lesbians helped with AIDS activism and caretaking. People of color formed new organizations to support LGBTQ communities of color and address AIDS' intersectional impacts. People of Color Against AIDS Network was founded in 1987 and focused on education about AIDS, safe sex, and treatment options. Entre Hermanos developed English and Spanish outreach programs and combated homophobia in Latino communities.

Seattle's most major HIV focused organization is likely Lifelong AIDS Alliance. Lifelong is a non-profit organization which provides services for people living with AIDS, and is simultaneously active in the LGBT community by holding support groups and awareness events such as Gay Bingo. Lifelong has merged with a number of non-profit organizations during its lifetime, including the Northwest AIDS Foundation, the Chicken Soup Brigade, and Evergreen Wellness Advocates.

Shanti/Seattle was created to train volunteers to understand the emotional stages of HIV/AIDS. Another key organization is the Dunshee House, which was originally born from the Dorian Society. Dunshee House organizes all levels and types of support groups for HIV seropositive people.

While many Seattle organizations providing AIDS support were grassroots community movements, some were operated by large health institutions. The Madison Clinic was opened in 1985 by the publicly-owned Harborview Medical Center on First Hill. It was "one of the country’s first hospital-based clinics dedicated to HIV and AIDS care." In 1992 the Bailey-Boushay House - the first AIDS hospice care center in the United States - opened in Seattle's Madison Valley neighborhood. It is operated by Virginia Mason Medical Center.

=== Other health issues ===
In the later 1990s and early 2000s media announced a dangerous sense of malaise and complacency in the gay community generally over safe-sex practices. AIDS was becoming more "normalized", risky sexual practices were increasing and gonorrhea, syphilis and chlamydia cases all rose. A combination of effectiveness in anti-retroviral therapies and increase in use of intravenous drugs influenced a rise in sexually transmitted infections (STI). In early 1999, King County Public Health reported an "alarming" increase in sexually transmitted infections amongst men who have sex with men. The "watershed moment" occurred in 2003 when King County Public Health released a report saying that STI had increased in gay/bisexual men by 40% over the past year.

In an article, Michael Brown notes that the geography is intertwined with politics. Seattle's sexual playgrounds were all geographically concentrated and were open at times that other establishments weren't. Seattle's preventative efforts may also have been part of the issue.

=== Political representation ===
In 1987, Cal Anderson was appointed to the 43rd District's vacant Washington State House seat, becoming the first out gay legislator in the state. The 43rd District represents most of Seattle. Anderson won re-election three times before switching to the Washington State Senate, but died of AIDS a year later. Cal Anderson Park, in the center of Capitol Hill, was renamed after him in 2003. The 43rd District has been represented by at least one gay House or Senate representative for decades since then, including Ed Murray, Jamie Pedersen, Brady Walkinshaw, and Nicole Macri.

In 1991, Sherry Harris was elected to the Seattle City Council. She became the first openly lesbian member of the council. Harris also was the first out Black lesbian elected to any office in the U.S. She was the first candidate endorsed by the LGBTQ+ Victory Fund, and she co-founded the Gay/Lesbian/Bisexual Caucus National League of Cities. Tom Rasmussen was elected to the council in 2003, becoming its first out gay man. Rasmussen and the Museum of History and Industry collaborated to create the AIDS Memorial Pathway, recording the names of over 2,000 Washington residents who died of AIDS, sharing the stories of survivors, and creating a public memorial. In 2026, Joy Hollingsworth was unanimously chosen by the Seattle City Council to be its president, becoming the first openly queer woman and first Black woman to be its president.

In 2010, Joe McDermott was the first LGBTQ person elected to the King County Council, representing the 8th District, which includes part of Seattle. He had previously served as a state legislator, helping enact new laws to provide domestic partnerships with the same rights as marriages and to extend hate crime coverage to transgender people.

In 2013, Ed Murray was elected as Seattle's first openly gay mayor after many years as a lawmaker who helped push for gay rights in the state. He resigned in 2017 after five men accused him over that year of sexually abusing them when they had been teenagers. Murray denied the allegations, condemning his accusers and The Seattle Times, which continued publishing on the issue. However, the city's LGBTQ Commission called for his resignation, and public criticism grew with his responses to each allegation. Jenny Durkan was elected to replace him, taking office in November 2017 as the city's first out lesbian mayor. After Durkan defended police funding and violence during Seattle's George Floyd protests, the Seattle LGBTQ commission and Seattle Human Rights Commission both called for her resignation in October 2020.

== Same-Sex marriages and beyond ==
Same-sex marriage was legalized for all of Washington State on December 6, 2012, after the law signed by Governor Christine Gregoire was blocked by a voter referendum for most of that year. This formal recognition of same-sex partnership came after more than a decade of incremental legal challenges to a 1998 statute defining marriage as the union of a man and a woman.

Today, sodomy laws have been repealed by the Supreme Court, and Seattle has generally become more affirming of LGBTQ people. In 2026 the Seattle LGBTQ Commission wrote that "2SLGBTQIA+ persons widely recognize Seattle and Washington State as jurisdictions with strong legal protections". The Seattle mayor and other city officials have become more receptive to the gay community. More recently, gay bars and clubs have enjoyed a central prominence for community organizing.

=== Hate crimes ===
Despite the general atmosphere of tolerance towards the LGBT community in Seattle, there have been instances of homophobic hate crimes, particularly in Capitol Hill and in open public spaces such as Volunteer Park. In one case, in January 2009, eleven gay bars and clubs in Seattle were sent letters threatening ricin attacks.

=== Emigration from other States to Seattle ===
During the second presidency of Donald Trump, Seattle received an unusual increase in the number of LGBTQ Americans moving into the city from other US states. In particular, transgender Americans made up a large portion of this influx, "relocat[ing] from states such as Texas, Florida, Tennessee, Kansas, and Idaho due to anti-trans legislation, threats to personal safety, and barriers to healthcare and legal recognition". Several pre-existing local transgender support organizations noted an increase in requests for aid and assistance since 2025, including the Gender Justice League and TRACTION.

On Transgender Day of Visibility (March 31) 2026, the Seattle LGBTQ Commission sent a letter of recommendation to Mayor Katie Wilson petitioning her to declare a state of civil emergency in response to the "rapid influx of 2SLGBTQIA+ persons seeking refuge in Seattle for increased safety needs, civil rights protections, and access to essential services". The Seattle City Council would vote 9-0 on August 11, 2026 to allocate $300,00 USD in funding to local LGBTQ organizations "to better aid transgender residents and those seeking refuge from other areas", as part of the mid-year ordinance.

== See also ==
- LGBTQ culture in Seattle
- LGBTQ rights in Washington (state)
- LGBTQ rights in the United States
- Equal Rights Washington
- Washington House Bill 2661
