= Renton Hill, Seattle =

Neighborhood of Seattle, Washington, United States

Coordinates: 47°36′58″N 122°18′32″W

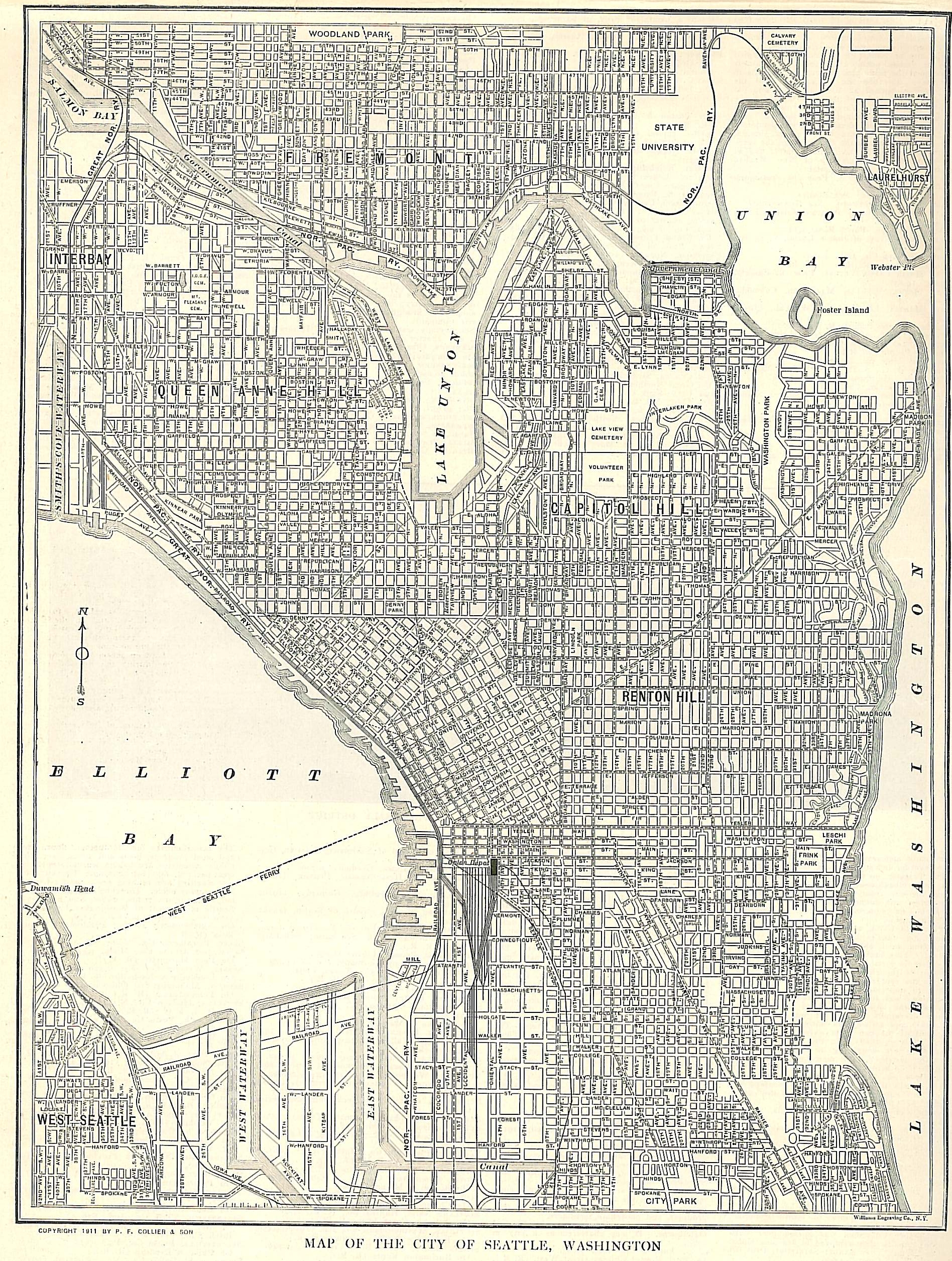
This 1911 map of Seattle shows the name Renton Hill slightly southeast of center.

Historically, Renton Hill was a neighborhood of Seattle, Washington, United States. Centered roughly at 18th Avenue and Madison Street, it was roughly the southern part of today's Capitol Hill plus a large adjacent section south of Madison Street. It was named after lumberman and merchant Captain William Renton (1818-1891) and replaced the earlier name of Second Hill.

== Early years ==
The Renton Hill Community Improvement Club was the city's first community club, organized in 1901 for public improvements such as water, sidewalks, lighting, and beautification. Along with the Capitol Hill Community Club, the club reorganized in 1929 to exclude racial minorities, using a restrictive covenant. This was in reaction to encroaching African American population from the east, Asian from the south, and urban downtown from the west.

In these early decades, Renton Hill's residents were mostly Russian, Greek, and Polish Catholics. The hill hosted Catholic and Lutheran hospitals, which served a broader range of people than Seattle's First Hill hospitals that targeted upper class patients. Because the Madison Street Trolley ran through Renton Hill on its way from Downtown to Lake Washington, people of different races, religions, and languages interacted in the neighborhood.^{:158}

== Queer community ==
By the late 1960s, many of the homes in the neighborhood had been converted to group homes and medical care facilities for the two hospitals there. At the time, Seattle's LGBTQ community in Pioneer Square had started moving out, and cheap rent on Renton Hill enabled key Seattle LGBTQ organizations to establish themselves in that neighborhood. From 1971 to 1977, Renton Hill was the hub of LGBTQ social services in Seattle, before the LGBTQ community firmly centered itself in Capitol Hill. LGBTQ establishments in Renton Hill were more visible and healing-focused than most previous underground spaces in Pioneer Square.^{:158-159,178}

=== Seattle Counseling Service ===
In 1969, Seattle's Dorian Society founded the Seattle Counseling Service, run by Bob Deisher, on Malden Avenue in Renton Hill.^{:158-159} Its initial name was the Seattle Counseling Service for Homosexuals. They did not have enough funds to hire counselors, and at the time, the American Psychiatric Association claimed that being gay was a mental health issue, so few mental health professionals were out. All the service's counselors were volunteers instead, including psychology students from the University of Washington and gay community members with no professional training. Many members of Seattle's Gay Liberation Front grew involved with the service, eventually helping run it.^{:158-159}

The Seattle Counseling Service had 42 clients in 1969, and 264 in 1970, along with the many who attended weekly group sessions, a technique the service learned from feminist groups.^{:158-159} By 1973, the service linked itself to Seattle's medical establishment to gain more funding, joining the Seattle Mental Health Institute and moving into its building on 1720 Sixteenth Avenue.^{:161} In 1974, Marsha Botzer began a trans support group there, eventually renamed the Ingersoll Gender Center. The Seattle Counseling Service joined the Washington Coalition for Sexual Minority Rights along with the Gay Community Center and many other organizations.

The service clashed with the medical establishment over keeping patient records, which was a safety and privacy risk for LGBTQ people at the time, and over avoiding politics and activism, which the service increasingly saw as essential to combating the discriminatory laws and harassment that caused mental health issues.^{:160} Patrick Haggerty, a co-director for the service, had advocated for this blend of counseling and political action in a social work thesis beforehand.^{:171} However, the service continued to institutionalize during fights with the King County Mental Health Board, and moved from the Renton Hill house into an office on Broadway in 1977.^{:174}

The Seattle Counseling Service created the first same-sex domestic violence program. They also offered various healthcare services like HIV antibody test counseling. The organization remained on Capitol Hill until 2020, and shut down in 2022 for financial reasons.

=== Stonewall Recovery ===
In 1971, William DuBay, a former Catholic priest, and David Baird, a social worker and member of the Dorian Society, founded the Stonewall group for healing gay and lesbian victims of the medical establishment. The group had similarities to Synanon, and it also served as a treatment program for queer people addicted to drugs and a halfway house for those released from jail.^{:163-164} Stonewall was certified as a drug treatment center in 1972. It had to fight to be allowed to serve parolees from Walla Walla State Penitentiary. The organization's methods focused on strict treatment regimens, along with group therapy.

Stonewall served around 500 people before closing in 1976. A series of funding issues arose and prejudiced and debunked reports of sexual abuse spread.^{:175} However, the staff continued the service as a drop-in program for decades.^{:177}

=== Metropolitan Community Church of Seattle ===
In 1972, Robert Sirico, a popular Pentecostal minister, came out as gay and announced he would build a church congregation where gay men and lesbians were not regarded as sinners.^{:161} A socially active United Methodist Church on Renton Hill let him share their space, although some members left over this choice, and other Methodists later fought the Methodist church over its politics and funding.^{:163,175} The Metropolitan Community Church Sirico founded moved in 1986 when the Methodist church closed, and remained active for decades.^{:177} Today, the church is called the Emerald City Metropolitan Community Church.

=== Gay Community Center ===
In 1974, the Gay Community Center moved into a house next to the Seattle Counseling Service. The center had briefly opened in Pioneer Square in 1971, sponsored by Gay Liberation Front members Paul Barwick, Faygele Ben-Miriam, and Robert Perry. When rent spiked, they held a drop-in center at the Seattle Counseling Service house instead, but moved out in 1974 to give the counseling center more space.^{:166-168} The center was created to make an alcohol-free social space for gay men and lesbians, but it mostly served gay men.

In its Renton Hill location, it had a library, job and housing board, and donation services for food and clothes. The center also ran a 24-hour hotline. The center joined the Washington Coalition for Sexual Minority Rights along with the Seattle Counseling Service and many other organizations. With the Queen City Business Guild, it established the Triangle Recreation Camp in the 1970s, a gay campground in the Cascade mountains. Their 1977 annual picnic had a grand piano and lots of beer, attracting 450 people and establishing the site's popularity.^{:260-261}

In 1976, the Gay Community Center was hit by two arson attacks and completely destroyed. The center relocated a few times for the next several years, but eventually disbanded.^{:177-178}

== Integration into Capitol Hill ==
In the early 1970s, Seattle grouped neighborhoods into planning zones informed by community councils, and placed Renton Hill and Capitol Hill together under the name Capitol Hill. At the time, Capitol Hill was much wealthier and less integrated with the city than Renton Hill. The combined community council provoked conflict between the group of single-family home-owners from North Capitol Hill and the developers who wanted to build out apartments and add commercial space.^{:168-169} The council soon decided to not allow any more group homes inside the single-family box houses on Capitol Hill.^{:170}

The name Renton Hill has fallen into disuse within Seattle, possibly to avoid confusion with a neighborhood in nearby Renton, WA, also named Renton Hill. The portion of Renton Hill north of Madison Street has been subsumed into Capitol Hill while the portion south of it is now commonly referred to as Cherry Hill.

Other new names used for it in the 2010s included T.T. Minor neighborhood and Squire Park, after local landmarks.^{:158}

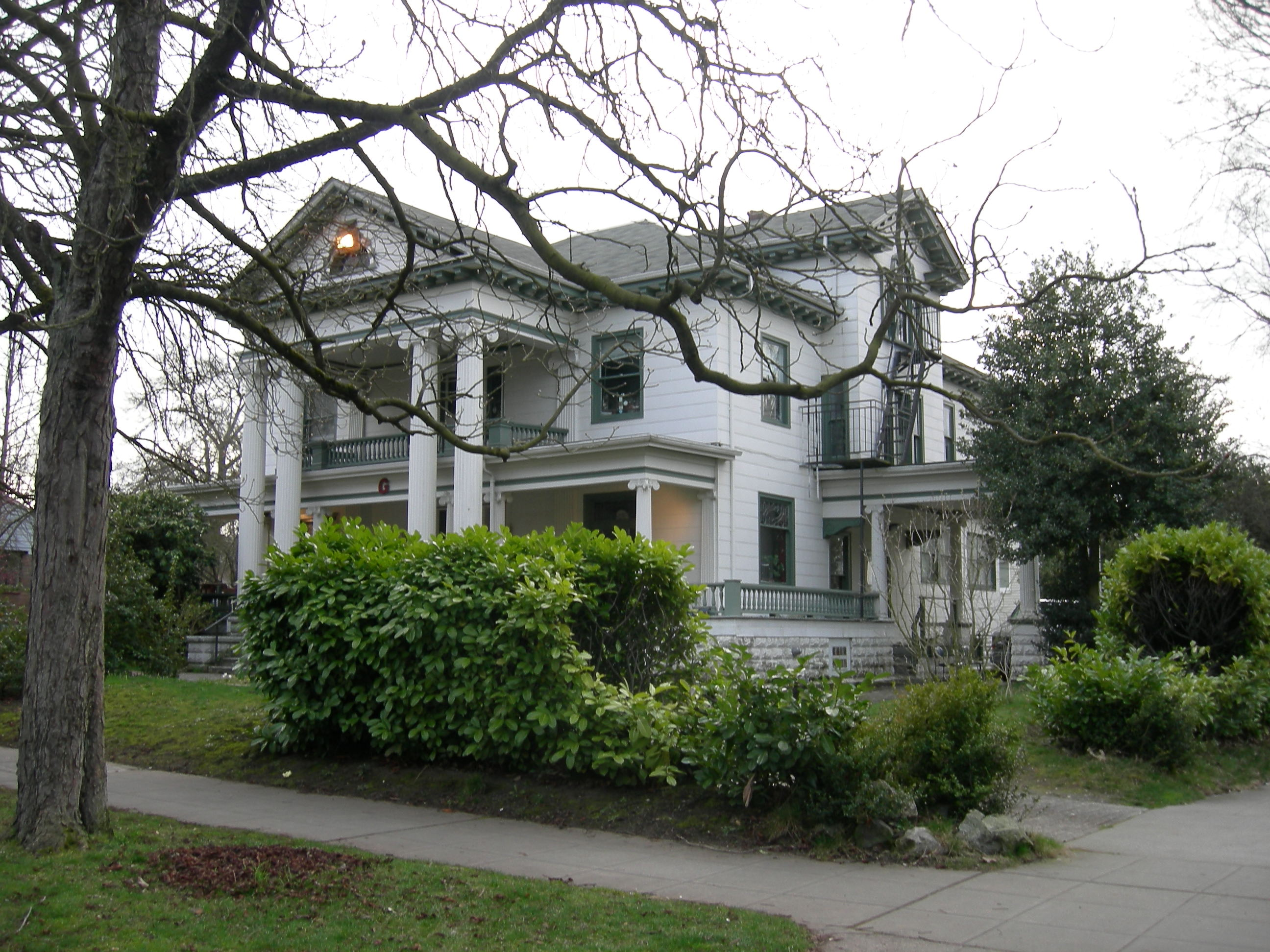
1729 17th Avenue, a long-surviving Renton Hill mansion from the early 20th Century, now demolished.

== See also ==
- Cherry Hill, Seattle, Washington
