= Harry Allen (trans man) =

American transgender man

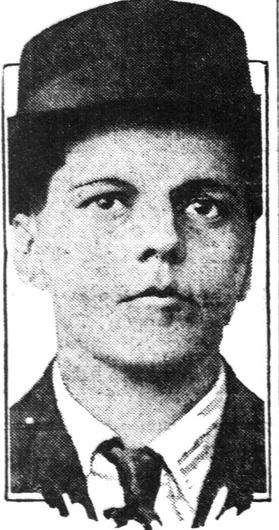
- Born: Nell Pickerell; 1882; Indiana, U.S.
- Died: December 27, 1922 (aged 40); Seattle, Washington, U.S.
- Other name: Harry Livingston
- Occupations: Ranch hand, bronco buster, longshoreman, bartender, boxing second, hotel clerk
- Known for: Early Pacific Northwest transgender man
- Children: 1

Harry Allen or Harry Livingston (1882 – December 27, 1922) was an American transgender man from the Pacific Northwest who was the subject of sensationalist local and national newspaper coverage from 1900 until his death in 1922. This press coverage made him the first transgender person documented in Seattle's LGBTQ history. The newspapers covered his petty crimes associated with life on the margins of society such as burglary, disorderly conduct, disturbing the peace, and vagrancy. He was also arrested after being involved in bar fights, and for drunkenness.

== Family and early life ==
Allen was born in Indiana as Nell Pickerell to Robert P. Pickerell and Jennie Gordon. The Pickerell family moved to the North End area of Seattle around 1894. Jennie Gordon shared that Allen was allowed to wear boys' clothing and indulge his interest in masculine activities from a young age. Even with all his run-ins with the law, his mother was often quoted defending him in the paper and testifying in support of him before a judge.

== Employment ==
Allen worked many kinds of jobs, such as waiter, hotel clerk, bartender, bouncer, shiphand, and cowhand. He was an aspiring prize fighter and a skilled boxer. Whenever the police made attempts to arrest Allen, he would fight back and officers had to wrestle him into handcuffs.

== Personal life ==
=== Aliases ===
Allen received disproportionate attention in reaction to his unapologetic rejection of a female gender assignment and refusal to conform to social demands that he dress and behave according to female norms. These titillating and exploitative stories—"great police blotter copy"—consistently referred to him with she/her pronouns and used his dead name, which is recorded in many of the news stories about him at the time alongside his chosen name, even while also reporting that Allen did take offense at this, and was outspoken in his insistence that he not be, in modern terms, misgendered. His name had been Harry Livingston from around 1900 until 1911, and then Harry Allen after, but he is known on at least one occasion to have used the name George Allen.

=== Suicides of his love interests ===
Allen was known to be a notorious ladies' man who pursued multiple women at a time, including married women. Of the many women he sought, or who sought him, four are reported to have died by suicide. The first was Dolly Quappe, who had been dating Allen for three weeks at the time of her death on December 25, 1901. The Seattle Star reported that Quappe had not known that Allen was transgender until he was arrested on suspicion of theft, having stolen an overcoat at a dance in Ballard. After Quappe's suicide, newspapers reported that Allen's jailers said he joked with them about having fooled Quappe about his sex. When he was released, on Christmas Day Quappe confronted him about his dating another young woman, Mabel Lacke. The two fought and Quappe snatched away Allen's watch-chain which contained a locket with a photograph of Lacke. Quappe was so angry as to threaten Allen's life and to threaten to kill herself. Later that day, she was found to have ingested carbolic acid she purchased from a pharmacy and died that evening. The Seattle Star reported the cause of her distress as the jealousy that she felt upon learning of Allen's duplicitousness, but other newspapers in the region implied or stated that it was also due to Allen's assigned sex at birth. According to The Victoria Daily Times, part of Quappe's infatuation with Allen was that he bore a resemblance to a man to whom she had previously been engaged, who had left her to marry another woman. After her death, Allen insisted that Quappe was aware of his transition, but police did not take him at his word because in all their letters she called him Harry Livingston.

The second woman to reportedly die by suicide, due to heartbreak by Allen, was Hazel Walters. A report by a Walla Walla paper, The Evening Statesman, erroneously attributed the story of Quappe's death to Walters's name, but provides the occasion of her death as March 1902. According to a profile published by The Seattle Star in 1915, Walters's manner of death was to throw herself from a 'cliff' at Madrona Park because she discovered he "was a woman". Walters left behind a note saying "I love you, Harry, though you are a living lie."

The third of Allen's lovers to die by suicide was Pearl Waldron, who shot herself in the chest with a 32-caliber revolver in Denny Park on November 4, 1903. Waldron and Allen had met at a dance in Georgetown. Waldron was found lying bloody in the park by a passerby who called the police and ambulance. She was taken to a hospital, and doctors worked to remove the bullet for over two hours before giving up on finding it all due to it being near vital organs. For more than an hour after she was found, Waldron refused to give her name or address. When she finally gave in, she also asked that they send for Harry Livingston. Though Waldron left, she never stated her actions were related to Allen. The press and public laid the familiar suspicion that she was driven to shock and despair by discovering that he was transgender. Allen's mother told police and the press that she was sure Waldron knew, but Waldron's friends insisted that she did not and that she only knew him as Harry Livingston. Coincidentally, Waldron had a sister who had also shot herself over an unrequited love.

The fourth of Allen's paramours to die by suicide was Gertie Samuels, in January 1909. According to reports, Samuels shot herself in the chest after Allen left her at the altar because they couldn't be married. Allen claimed one of the suicide stories was fabricated by a reporter in Seattle for a quick payout, and that nobody ever committed suicide over him.

== Incarceration ==
On September 26, 1911, Allen was arrested for selling liquor to an indigenous person in Spokane, Washington. This was the first charge on which police held Allen for a prolonged period while he awaited a criminal trial. While incarcerated, the chief of the Spokane police tried to force Allen to switch to wearing skirts and feminine undergarments. The press and public were interested enough in what type of clothing he wore that they ran at least five articles during his two month stay at the county jail on whether Allen had donned a skirt yet. The police chief gave Allen the ultimatum between solitary confinement or finally wearing a dress when the jail reopened its women's ward, but Allen remained in the clothes of his choosing for the entirety of his stay at the county jail.

== Death ==
Allen died of syphilitic meningitis in 1922, at the age of 40.

== See also ==
- Edward De Lacy Evans (1830–1901), an Australian transgender man
- Transgender history in the United States

== Newspaper articles ==
- "In Male Attire; 'Harry Livingston' Says She Will Wear Them. A Masquerading Girl Gave the Police a Good Run Last Night. May Go to Nome.", Seattle Daily Times, p. 7, April 20, 1900
- "This Girl Refuses to Wear Skirts; Nellie Pickerell Acts, Talks and Dresses Like a Man, and says She Ought to Have Been One", The Boston Post, p. 15, April 30, 1900
- "Goes By The Name Of Harry; Nell Pickerell and Her Peculiar Mania; She is Ashamed of Her Sex— Arrested This Morning on the Charge of Theft", Seattle Daily Times, p. 5, October 12, 1901
- "Suicide Ends the Love Affair", San Francisco Call, vol. 91, no. 26, December 26, 1901
- "Police Briefs", Seattle Daily Times, p. 7, January 9, 1902
- "Nell Pickerell In Court; Her Trial for Throwing a Spittoon at a Saloon Man Is Continued", Seattle Daily Times, p. 14, August 4, 1902
- "Girl Tries To End Her Life; Pearl Waldron Falls in Love With Notorious Nell Pickerell", Seattle Daily Times, p. 3, November 4, 1903
- "Shoots Herself In The Chest; Pretty Young Woman of Seattle Attempts Suicide", San Francisco Call, November 5, 1903
- "Nell Pickerell Again", Seattle Daily Times, p. 17, July 10, 1904
- "Nellie Pickerell Arrested. Woman Dressed in Male Attire Is Again Sent to Jail", Seattle Daily Times, p. 10, July 21, 1905
- "Police Baffled By Silence Of A Nervy Young Woman; Female After Month's Imprisonment; Refuses to Tell What She Knows About Big Robbery", San Francisco Call, vol. 99, no. 83, February 21, 1906
- "The Notorious Nell Pickerell in Town", The Ellensburgh Capital, Ellensburg, Washington, p. 3, February 13, 1900
- "Nell Pickerell Again in Jail", Seattle Daily Times, p. 11, October 23, 1907
- "Nell Pickerell in a Tacoma Strongbox; Girl Who Insists on Wearing Men's Clothes is Believed to be Member of Dangerous Gang", Seattle Daily Times, p. 1, January 21, 1908
- "Nell Pickerell Tended Bar in Montana Town; Seattle Woman Appears in Men's Clothes Because She Says Her Features Make it Possible", Seattle Daily Times, p. 5, April 27, 1908
- "How Catherine Madden Fell Victim to Strong Drink; Why Nell Pickerell Will Not Wear Women's Clothing", The Spokesman-Review, October 22, 1911
- "Nell Pickerell Returning to Jail", The Spokesman-Review, p. 3, November 15, 1911
- "Nell Pickerell Denies Her Sex; Woman Who Dresses in Male Attire Starts Story She is a 'Real Man'; Rumor Causes Sensation; Sheriff Stone Brands Statement an Untrue Fabrication Result of Liquor", The Spokesman-Review, p. 4, November 22, 1911
- "Trousered Woman Bites Policeman", Seattle Daily Times, p. 2, July 22, 1915
- "Nell Pickerell Stabbed", Seattle Daily Times, p. 5, September 27, 1916
- "Nell Pickerell is Stabbed by Father; Woman Who Masqueraded Here as Man Hurt in Row With Parent at Seattle", Spokane Daily Chronicle, p. 13, September 28, 1916
- "Nell Pickerell Asks for $50 Pay For Services", Seattle Daily Times, p. 19, July 1, 1917
- "PICKERELL — Funeral services for Nell Pickerell will take place from the Butterworth mortuary, 1921 First Ave., Saturday, Dec. 30, at 4 p. m. All friends invited. Cremation.", Seattle Daily Times, p. 15, December 28, 1922
- "Nell Pickerell is Dead; Masqueraded as Man, Attracting Attention Here", Seattle Daily Times, p. 11, December 28, 1922
