= Paul Barwick =

American LGBT rights activist and same-sex marriage pioneer

Paul Barwick (born 1946) is an American former LGBT rights activist and same-sex marriage pioneer. In 1972, he filed one of the first lawsuits in the history of the United States regarding the right of gays and lesbians to marry, after he and the late fellow activist John Singer were denied a civil marriage license at the King County Administration Building in Seattle, Washington. The case, Singer v. Hara, was the best-known gay marriage case in the state of Washington until Andersen v. King County in 2006. He moved to San Francisco, California, which was his residence for 30 years, but he now currently lives in Centralia WA.

== Biography ==
Born in Washington, Barwick served three years in the U.S. Army during the Vietnam War, working as a military policeman. Later, he became an emergency dispatcher for the Washington State Patrol, and attended Olympic College in Bremerton. Barwick ran unsuccessfully for vice-president of the student body, while attending Olympic. It was at Olympic where he disclosed to a nurse on campus that he believed there was a possibility he could be gay. The nurse supported Barwick after his disclosure, and went with him to the University of Washington, where the Seattle chapter of the Gay Liberation Front was holding meetings once a week. It was at that meeting where he encountered John Singer. After the gathering, the nurse decided to invite the Front members to a seminar on campus, where more than 200 students were in attendance. When one of the guest speakers ended up calling in sick to the seminar, Barwick stepped in to replace them. After he outed himself in the presence of the students in Bremerton, he made the decision to move to Seattle to join a commune of LGBTQ activists, not returning to his job at the State Patrol, where he would have to remain in the closet.

It was at the commune where he met up with Singer again, and they became partners. Singer was the only one who held down a job in the commune, working for the federal government. It was Singer's salary that financed their activism; opening the first LGBTQ community center in Seattle, a safe-house for LGBTQ parolees, and establishing a center for LGBTQ people to receive counseling. The residents of the commune also coordinated protests in opposition to the Vietnam War. Barwick and Singer also organized, and held meetings, for the Seattle chapter of the 'Gay Vietnam Veterans Against The War', an organization that attempted to expose the "atrocities that have been committed against gay servicemen and women". In April 1973, Barwick was involved in a protest against the beating of a lesbian at the hands of the police. He, along with three others, met with a police official who informed them that their complaints would be considered unfounded, unless an "impartial witness" came forward to verify their stories, and a gay person did not qualify as an "impartial witness".

== The license and lawsuit ==
On September 20, 1971, the couple went to the King County auditor's office and asked for a marriage license from Lloyd Hara, the auditor. For his part, Hara was unsure of the legality of the request, and he contacted the prosecutor's office, asking if it was legal to issue the couple a license. They were denied the license. Singer had argued that same-sex couples should get the same benefits, like the tax break, that heterosexual couples were receiving. Barwick also asserted that they should qualify for the G.I. family plans if they were allowed to get married, since he was a veteran. The pair was supported by the Seattle Gay Alliance, and the Seattle chapter of the Gay Liberation Front, in their effort to obtain a marriage license. Many years later, Hara told The Seattle Times that he agreed with the pair, stating: "I thought it was wrong then and I still firmly feel the same way."

On April 27, 1972, they filed a lawsuit against Hara, claiming the denial violated their constitutional rights, because "equality of rights and responsibilities under the law shall not be denied or abridged on account of sex". King County Superior Court Judge Frank Howard rejected Barwick and Singer's claims of discrimination. In 1974, the Washington Court of Appeals upheld Howard's ruling, saying that the "auditor's office was within its right to make the refusal". The court also stated that marriage existed as a protected legal institution "primarily because societal values associated with the propagation of the human race". Their reasoning for not appealing any further was basically for two reasons; they were strapped for cash, and they didn't want to be responsible for setting the wrong precedent, thinking a denial from the Washington Supreme Court could close off the debate. Many LGBTQ activists described the rejections as having been "laughed out" of two courts.

Marriage equality was signed into law in Washington by Governor Christine Gregoire on February 13, 2012.

== See also ==
- History of the LGBT community in Seattle
- LGBT rights in Washington
- List of LGBT rights activists
- Timeline of same-sex marriage
