= Squire Park, Seattle =

Coordinates: 47°36′21″N 122°18′34″W

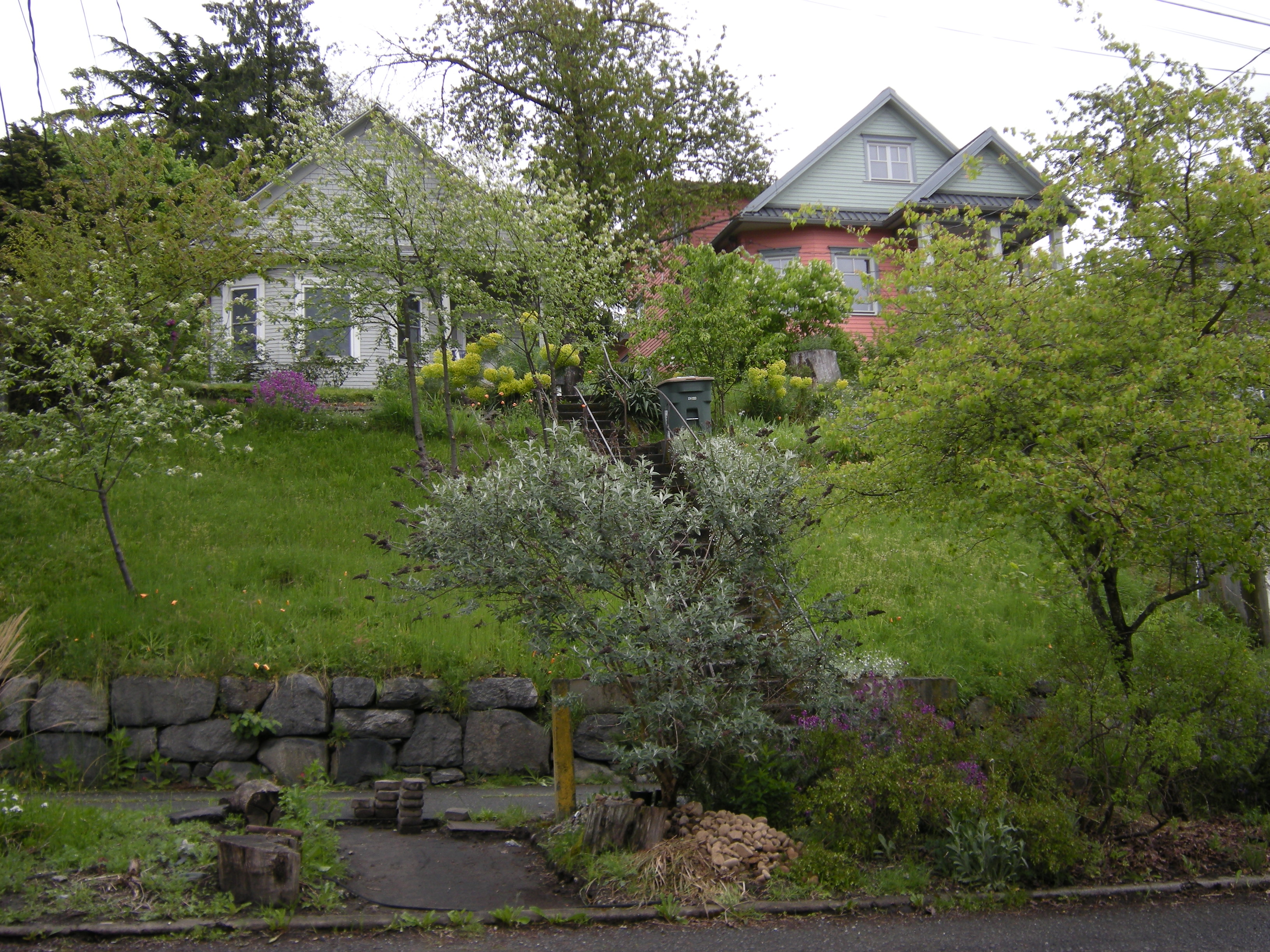
Houses at 320 and 316 15th Avenue, Squire Park

Squire Park is a neighborhood in the city of Seattle, in the U.S. state of Washington. According to the Squire Park Community Council, it is bounded on the south by S. Jackson Street, on the west by 12th Avenue and 12th Avenue S., on the north by E. Union Street, and on the east by 23rd Avenue and 23rd Avenue S., placing it within the Central District. Its main thoroughfares are E. Jefferson and Cherry Streets and E. Yesler Way (east- and west-bound) and 14th Avenue (north- and south-bound). Swedish Medical Center's Cherry Hill campus is located here. Seattle University, a Jesuit University, has part of its campus in Squire Park, as the admissions department, some dormitories, and athletics department are east of 12th Avenue.

Previously, Squire Park was considered part of the Renton Hill neighborhood. Russian, Greek, and Polish Catholics were its primary residents until it became oriented toward medical use by the 1960s. During the 1970s, it served as a key spot for Seattle's LGBTQ community, which was moving away from Pioneer Square.^{:157-159}

Squire Park overlaps considerably with Cherry Hill, although Squire Park boundaries are shifted slightly southwards, with the northern boundary at E. Union Street rather than E. Madison Street, and the southern boundary at S. Jackson Street rather than Yesler Way.

Squire Park is named after Watson Squire, who was a Washington territory governor, Washington state's first U.S. senator, and owner of much of the original neighborhood land in a parcel bounded by 12th and 20th avenues and Cherry and Alder streets. This parcel was platted by Squire in 1890 and acquired by the city of Seattle in 1891.

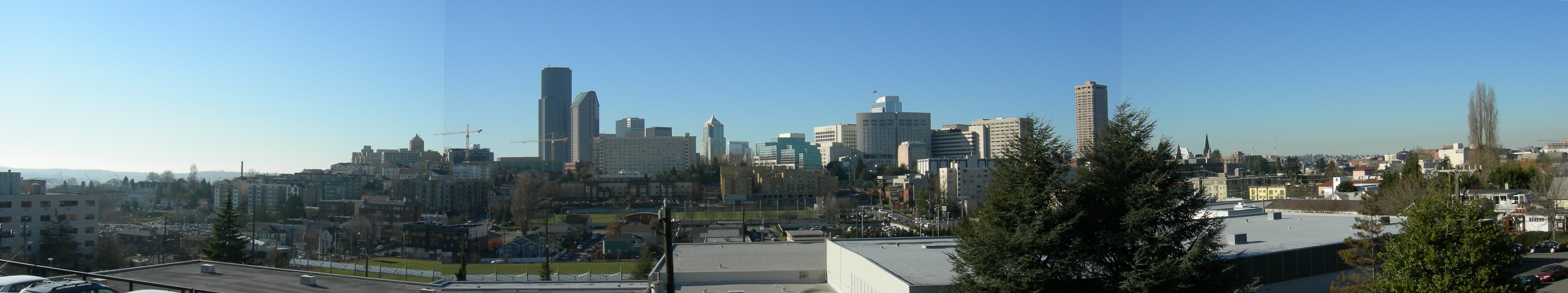
First Hill and Downtown seen from Swedish Medical Center Cherry Hill
