= Blackberry Rose =

Studio album by Lavender Country
- Released: February 18, 2022
- Genres: Country; Americana
- Length: 42:22
- Label: Don Giovanni
- Producers: Robert Hammerstrom, Bobby Inocente

Lavender Country chronology
Lavender Country (1973)	Blackberry Rose (2022)

Professional ratings
Review scores
Source	Rating
Exclaim!	8/10
No Depression	favorable
Pitchfork	7.7/10

Blackberry Rose is the second and final studio album by Lavender Country, released 49 years after their private press debut. It was released on February 18, 2022, via Don Giovanni Records. In 2019 the group self-released Blackberry Rose and Other Stories on CD and sold it at local shows. The album used the same cover art, but contained a different track list and alternate versions of the songs found on the 2022 release, as well as a new version of "I Can't Shake the Stranger Out of You", from the band's titular first album. It is the last release by the band prior to lead singer Patrick Haggerty's passing on October 31 of the same year.

== Track listing ==
No.	Title	Length
1.	"I Can't Shake the Stranger Out of You"	4:27
2.	"Gay Bar Blues"	4:42
3.	"Leave All Disillusions Behind"	3:53
4.	"Red Dress"	4:24
5.	"Sweet Shadow Man"	2:42
6.	"Clara Fraser, Clara Fraser"	5:28
7.	"Lament of a Wyoming Housewife"	4:01
8.	"Blackberry Rose"	6:34
9.	"Stand on Your Man"	3:07
10.	"Don't Buy Her No More Roses"	3:07
Total length:		42:22
