= Cherry Hill, Seattle =

Neighborhood in Seattle, Washington

Coordinates: 47°36′29″N 122°18′32″W

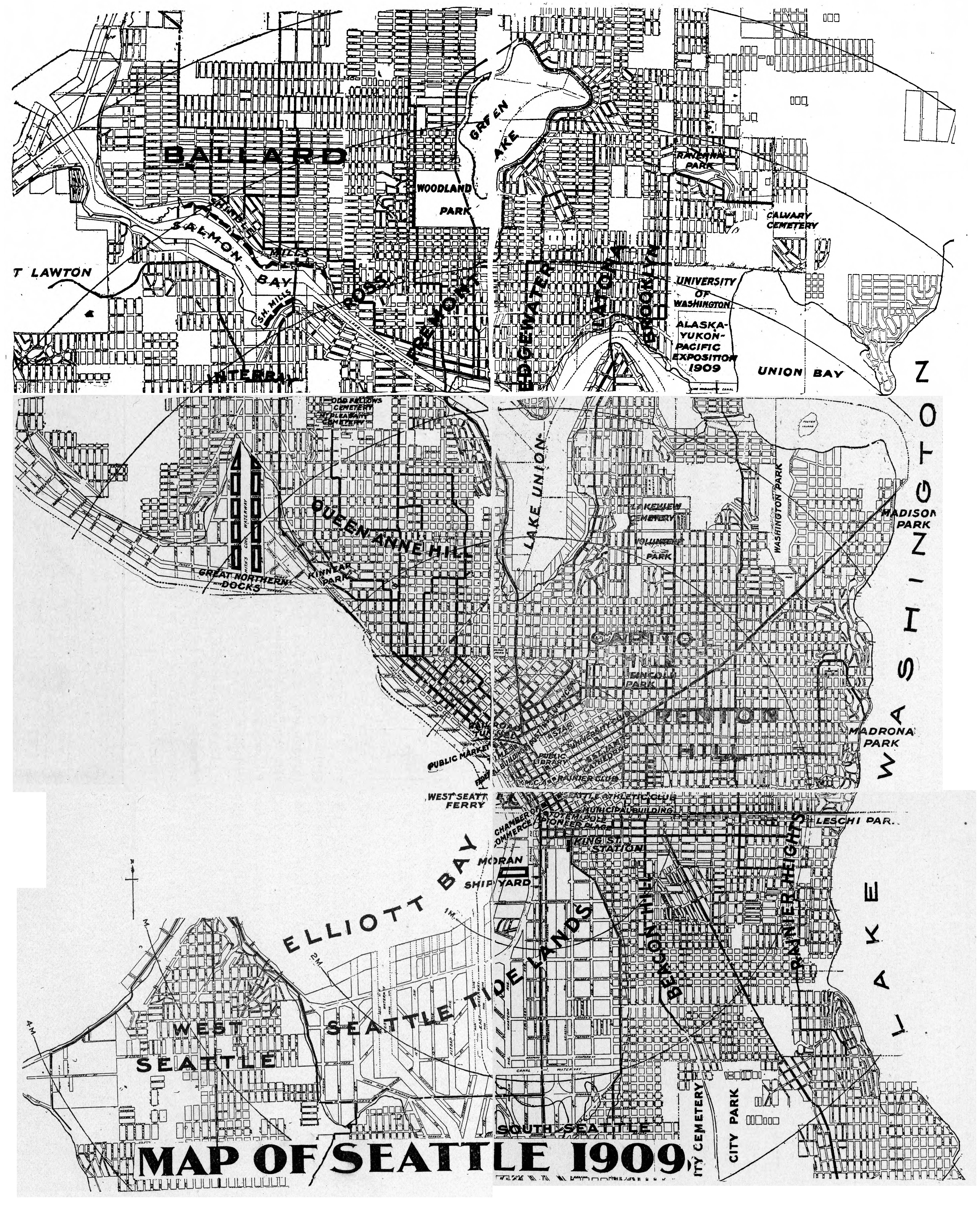
1909 Seattle map with the area currently known as Cherry Hill designated as Renton Hill.

Cherry Hill is a neighborhood and predominantly residential area in Seattle, Washington, located south of Capitol Hill within the Central District, north of the International District, and east of First Hill. Cherry Hill is bound on the west by 14th Avenue, on the east by 23rd Avenue, on the north by East Madison Street and on the south by East Yesler Way. Cherry Hill overlaps considerably with the neighborhood of Squire Park as defined by the Squire Park Neighborhood Council. In the Seattle City Clerk's Geographic Indexing Atlas, Cherry Hill is designated as the Minor neighborhood of the Central Area. Cherry Hill was previously called Second Hill or Renton Hill.

== Geography ==
Cherry Hill is located on a north-south ridge situated east of the Seattle downtown area and First Hill, roughly equidistant between Puget Sound and Lake Washington. The neighborhood of Capitol Hill resides on the northern two-thirds of this ridge, while Cherry Hill resides on the southern third, with East Madison Street serving as the boundary between the two. The highest point of elevation in Cherry Hill is 420 feet above sea level at the broadcast towers on East Madison Street. Despite the fact that Cherry Hill and Capitol Hill designate adjacent regions of a single ridge, they are considered by Seattle historian Walt Crowley as two of the Seven Hills of Seattle.

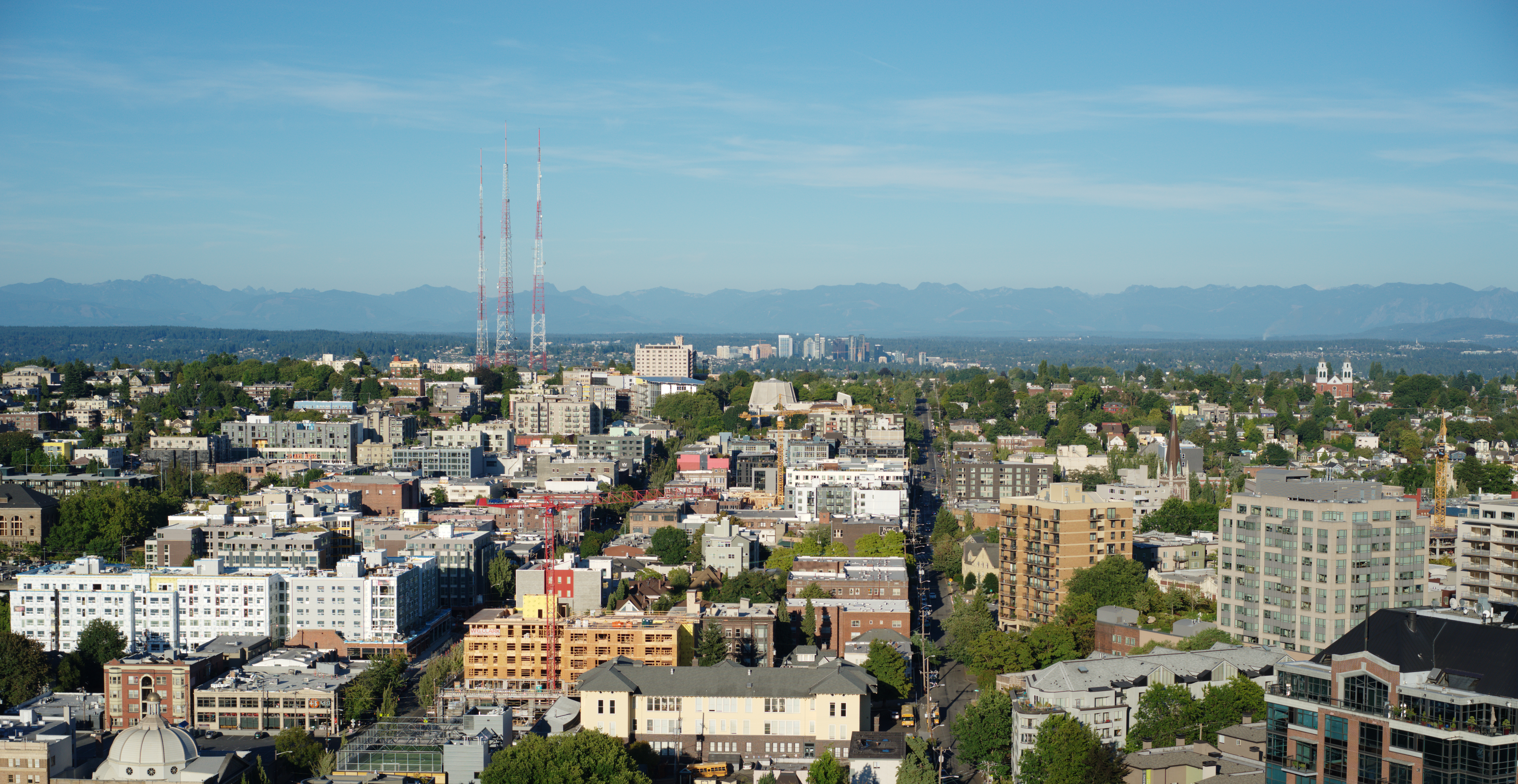
View of Capitol Hill and Cherry Hill neighborhoods, looking east along Union Street. Cherry Hill resides to the east and south of Capitol Hill, equivalent to behind and to the right in this view. Cherry Hill landmarks visible include the three broadcast towers at Madison Street and 18th Ave, the Temple De Hirsch Sinai with its gray conical frustum in the center of the photo, and the Church of the Immaculate Conception at Marion St and 18th Ave with its two white towers near the right of the photo.

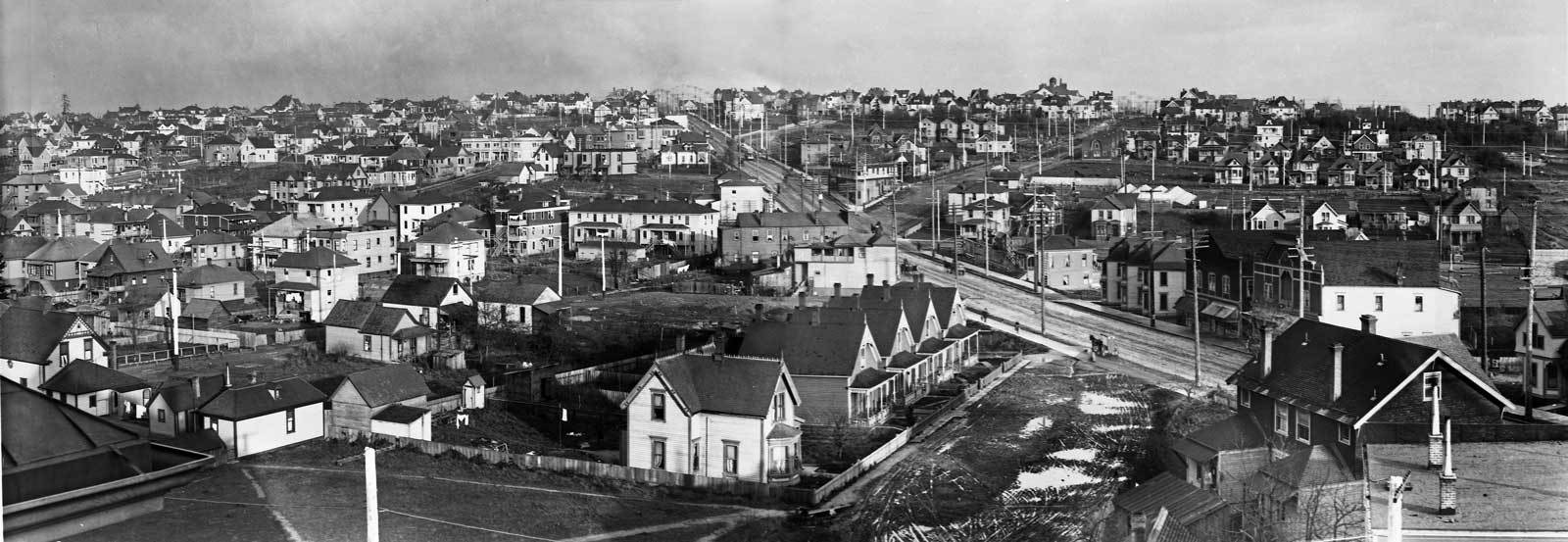
View of Cherry Hill circa 1905. At that time it was called either Second Hill or Renton Hill. Running diagonally through the image from bottom-right to top-left is Madison Street. Intersecting Madison Street in the center of the image and running to the top-right is Union Street. The cupola of the original T. T. Minor School is visible at the crest of the hill between Madison and Union Street. The original school building was razed and replaced with the current one in the 1940s. The current-day location of the broadcast towers would be at the top of Madison Street in this photo.

== History ==
The northern section of current-day Cherry Hill near Madison Street was originally named Second Hill, then later Renton Hill. The portion of the current-day Cherry Hill neighborhood bounded by Union and Cherry Streets and 10th and 20th Streets was added to the city of Seattle in 1870 as the Edes and Knight addition, and was replatted in 1890. A more southern section between Cherry and Alder Streets and 12th and 20th Avenues was added in 1890 as the Squire Park addition, after former Washington Territory governor and US Senator Watson Squire, who formerly owned the land in that section.

The name Cherry Hill was suggested by city councilmember Harlan Edwards in 1959 to describe the area for an Urban Renewal Project bounded by Cherry and Yesler Streets and 17th and 23rd Avenues, which includes Squire Park. The name Cherry Hill was subsequently widely used throughout this area in the 1960s and 1970s, and was also used for structures north of Cherry Street such as the Cherry Hill Community Center and the Cherry Hill Baptist Church. The naming of a larger neighborhood named Squire Park bounded by Union and Jackson Streets and 12th and 23rd Avenues appeared with the establishment of the Squire Park Neighborhood Council in 1986. The renaming of Providence Hospital to Swedish Medical Center Cherry Hill in 2007 reintroduced the name Cherry Hill to the area from Madison Street to the hospital.

From 1959 to 1976 the Cherry Hill Urban Renewal Project mentioned above—also known as Conservation Project No. 1—was Seattle's first urban renewal project. The area between Cherry Street and Yesler Way has seen a number of progressions, with a large number of Scandinavians at the beginning of the 20th century, evolving to a predominantly Jewish neighborhood through the 1960s and a predominantly African-American neighborhood in the 1980s. During the 1970s, the hill also housed key parts of Seattle's LGBTQ community. As the community shifted out of Pioneer Square, groups like the Dorian Society and Gay Liberation Front created healing-focused services that were more visible than LGBTQ gathering spaces had previously been in Seattle.^{:157-159}

From 2016 to 2020, the Lutheran Church of the Good Shepherd and the Low Income Housing Institute sponsored a tiny house village at the corner of Union Street and 22nd Avenue. In 2020, a new tiny house village named was established on the southeast corner of Cherry Street and 22nd Avenue, on land formerly belonging to the Christ Spirit Church (formerly the Cherry Hill Baptist Church).

The enduring nature of both the Cherry Hill and Squire Park neighborhood names may be explained by advantages of each. Cherry Hill serves as a convenient replacement for the Renton Hill name, which has fallen out of favor, and acknowledges that the neighborhood shares a geographic feature with the adjacent Capitol Hill neighborhood while maintaining Madison St as the traditional southern border of Capitol Hill. Squire Park has the advantage of historical continuity and usage in property records, although this only applies for the region between Cherry and Alder Streets. Designating Cherry Hill and Squire Park as two different neighborhoods separated by Cherry Street may be a way to retain both names, although this would entail assigning the entire area originally named Cherry Hill in 1959 to Squire Park.

== Landmarks (from north to south) ==
- Temple De Hirsch Sinai Jewish Temple
- T.T. Minor Elementary School
- Spring Street Mini Park
- Church of the Immaculate Conception, Seattle's oldest Roman Catholic Church. Built in 1904. The parish was founded by the Jesuit Fathers in 1891.
- Fire Station #23 (remodelled as the Cherry Hill Community Center in 1970)
- Cherry Hill Baptist Church Protestant Christian Church (demolished 2018)
- Swedish Hospital Cherry Hill Campus (formerly Providence Hospital): The first hospital in Seattle, established in 1877 by the Sisters of Providence, a Catholic charity. In 1910, Providence Hospital moved from its original downtown location to what was then already called Squire Park, and in 2000 became a campus of Swedish Hospital. Providence Hospital was the location of the first open-heart surgery performed in the northwest United States.
- Spruce Street Mini Park
- Washington Hall
