= Blackberri =

American singer-songwriter and activist (1945–2021)

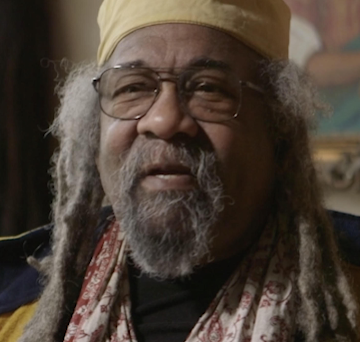
- Born: Charles Timothy Ashmore; May 31, 1945; Buffalo, New York, U.S.
- Died: December 13, 2021 (aged 76); Oakland, California, U.S.
- Education: University of Arizona
- Occupations: Singer-songwriter, LGBTQ+ rights activist

Blackberri (born Charles Timothy Ashmore; May 31, 1945 – December 13, 2021) was an American singer-songwriter and community activist. His music focused on issues such as civil rights, LGBT rights, and pollution. During the AIDS epidemic, Blackberri worked in HIV education and prevention in Black communities.

== Early life ==
Blackberri was born in Buffalo, New York, and raised in Baltimore.

Blackberri was drafted into the U.S. Navy in 1965. He was discharged in 1966 for being gay. Blackberri stated "I was under investigation because one of my shipmates turned me in ... they had evidence, they arrested me, went through my personal belongings and found incriminating letters and other things." He got stranded in New York City, washing dishes and doing drugs.

== Career ==
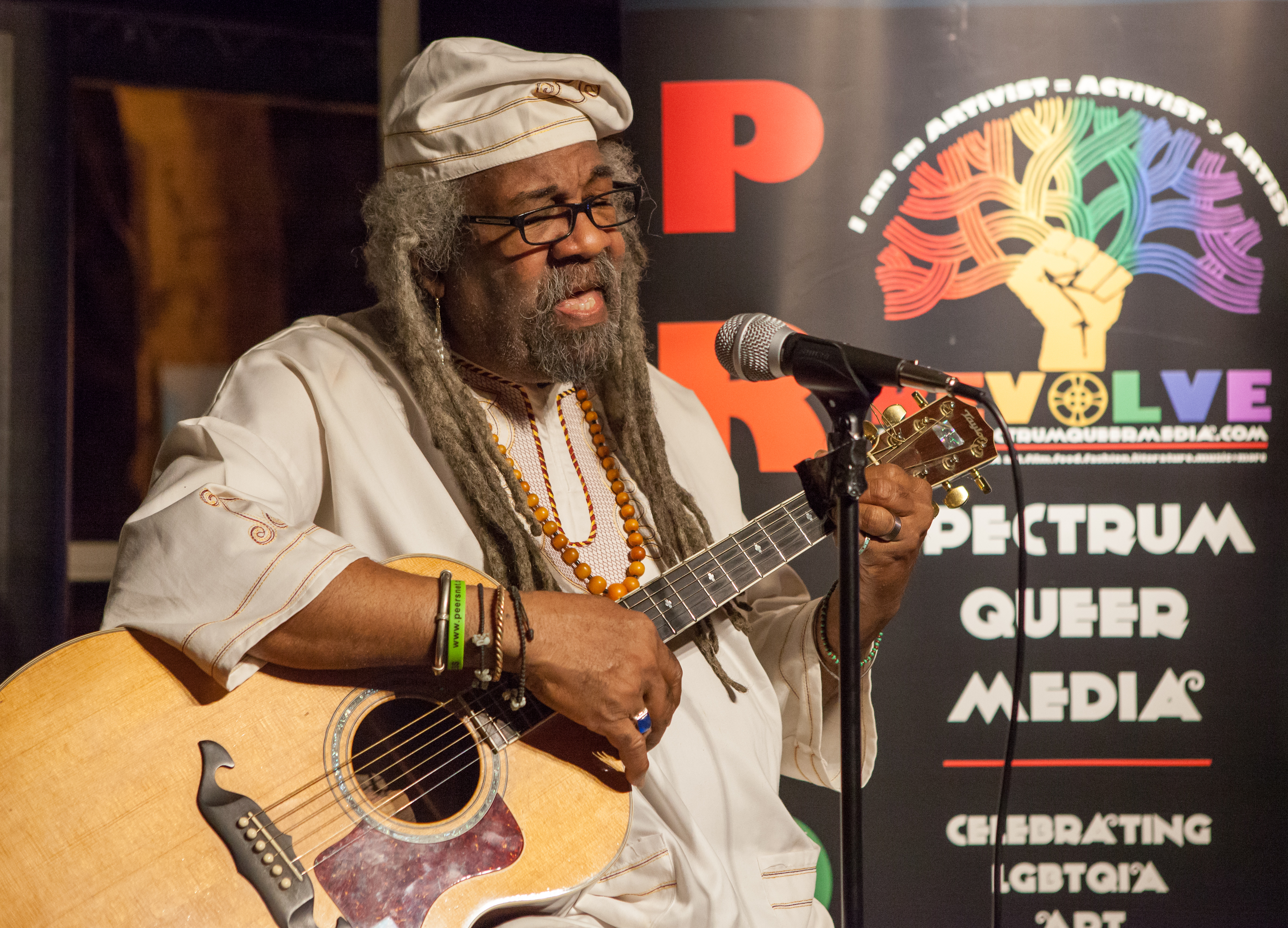
Blackberri performing at a 2016 event in Oakland

Blackberri studied voice at University of Arizona and sang the blues. In Tucson, he started a rock band, Gunther Quint, with his first song "Frenchie", about a one-night stand before his discharge. While living in a feminist collective in 1970, he was named Blackberri, and changed his name legally.

Blackberri moved to San Francisco in 1974 and joined Breeze while busking to earn money. He dated Reiner, a blues guitar player from the East Coast. In 1975, Blackberri's performance at the Two Songmakers concert was broadcast on KQED. This was the first gay-themed music featured on television in San Francisco. In 1981, he released Blackberri and Friends: Finally. He contributed to films Tongues Untied, Word Is Out: Stories of Some of Our Lives, and Looking for Langston.

During the AIDS epidemic, Blackberri supported HIV education and prevention in the African-American LGBT community. He was a death counselor at San Francisco General Hospital AIDS Ward through the Shanti Project.

In 2002, he received a Lifetime Achievement AIDS Hero Award at San Francisco Candlelight Vigil. In 2017, he received the Audrey Joseph Entertainment Award from San Francisco Pride. In 2019, his song "Eat the Rich" was included in Patrick Haggerty's Lavender Country.

== Personal life and death ==
Blackberri was a Lucumi priest who traveled to Cuba thirteen times.

He had a heart attack in October 2021, and died on December 13, 2021, at the Alta Bates Summit Medical Center in Oakland, California, at age 76.
