= Marsha C. Botzer =

Activist and non-profit administrator

Marsha C. Botzer is a Seattle based activist and non-profit administrator who has been working in the Transgender rights movement since the mid-1970s. Botzer is a trans woman herself. She founded Ingersoll Gender Center in Seattle in 1977, making it the oldest non-profit organization working in the space of transgender rights. Botzer was also an early member of Hands Off Washington and a founding member of Equality Washington, as well as Out in Front Leadership Project.

== Background ==
Prior to founding Ingersoll Gender Center, Botzer worked as a union organizer.

== Career ==
=== Foundation and Development of Ingersoll Gender Center ===
Botzer has cited a problem of joblessness and underemployment of transgender people as being the reasons for founding Ingersoll Gender Center. Getting the word out about the organization to a marginalized group before the internet posed a challenge. Botzer has said that in the face of this she would tuck Ingersoll Center business cards between the pages of books in the Seattle Public Library's small collection of books on the subject of gender. Over the course of the late-20th century, Botzer made over 100 trips accompanying transgender residents of Seattle to Trinidad, Colorado where they sought gender reassignment surgery. The center conducted post-operative care and follow up surveys with patients of such surgeries given by Dr. Stanley Biber over the years. Botzer reported in 1995 that out of over 200 case histories they heard 93% positive response. Botzer even introduced Dr. Biber, to Dr. Marci Bowers who succeeded him at his practice in Trinidad after he retired.

In the late 1980s, Botzer witnessed an increase in clients of the center who were assigned female at birth and sought a masculinizing medical transition. At this time there was a public perception that transexualism was something that only people assigned male at birth did or were, but Botzer was quoted explaining the rise in visibility of trans men as being due to an increase in surgical options available to them that allow them to transition in public.

=== Involvement with Public Policy ===
In a 2018 interview with the South Seattle Emerald, Botzer said that just over a decade after founding Ingersoll Gender Center, she felt the community she had worked to build had reached a solid foundation and she had the confidence to focus her efforts more on political and social change. The first phase of this political activism, according to Botzer, was to reach out to organizations focusing on gay, lesbian, and bisexual issues to advocate that transgender issues should be discussed in the same spaces as issues of sexuality.

Botzer was co-chair of The National LGBTQ Task Force from 2005 to 2006 and then again from 2009 to 2010. During her tenure there, steps were made in Washington state to protect against discrimination on the basis of sexuality when it comes to housing and employment. In 2008 she served as a national co-chair of the Barack Obama Pride Campaign. In 2009 she was on the leadership committee for the Equality Across America march in Washington, D.C. and spoke at the rally.

Having already worked on a national and international level, Botzer first gained a formalized role in local Seattle politics in 2015 when she was appointed to a task force under Mayor Ed Murray centered on LGBTQ issues. This task force got a law passed that requires all single-occupancy restrooms to be gender-neutral. The law applies to both City operated restrooms and privately owned places of public accommodation.

In 2019, Botzer was appointed to a King County Council task force focused on Gender Identity and Sexual Orientation Inclusion. In January 2020, Washington state created the LGBTQ Commission via legislation. codifying the state task force that had existed in prior years. Botzer was an inaugural commissioner, and was selected as a co-chair at the commission's first meeting.

In 2021 the Seattle Police Department was banned from participating in Capitol Hill Seattle Pride's march, and some gay cops said that they felt excluded from the Pride event. Botzer suggested a potential strategy to create solidarity between police and the LGBT community would be for the police department to hire more transgender cops, which she argued would reduce the accounts of police violence against transgender people. After the election of Bruce Harrell as Mayor of Seattle, Botzer was appointed to his administration's transition team; Botzer was a member of the group dedicated to "labor and workforce".

=== Education and Outreach Work ===
Throughout the 1990s and early 21st Century Botzer has served on the boards of many organizations working in the space of human rights related to gender identity and sexuality. She has also founded several such organizations. Since 2011 Botzer has been on the faculty of the.Los Angeles LGBT Center's Emerging Leaders Project. In 2012, Botzer was on the board of directors for the World Professional Association for Transgender Health during the development of Version 7 of the Standards of Care for the Health of Transsexual, Transgender, and Gender Nonconforming People.

In 2003, shortly following the Supreme Court of the United States made the decision to strike down anti-sodomy laws, Botzer worked via the Pride Foundation advocating on behalf of employees of Walmart to include discrimination on the basis of homosexuality to the company's anti-discrimination policy.

Botzer co-authored a research paper published in the International Journal of Transgender Health in 2010 that proposes changes to the DSM-5 for diagnoses related to transgenderism.

In 2019 Botzer was one of the group of people to decide who the first 50 honorees for the new Stonewall Inn Wall of Honor.

== Controversies ==
=== Racism allegations at Ingersoll Gender Center ===
In 2021, an issue of racist bias and discrimination within Ingersoll Gender Center was raised by a group of past and present employees of the organization, calling themselves Ingersoll Collective Action. Marsha Botzer had become more removed from the day to day of the center's operations over the decades but was still on the board of directors at the time. When the press sought her for comment on the story she declined to give a personal statement and stood by the statements provided by the organization and its board instead. Botzer was not named among any of those persons Ingersoll Collective Action demanded resign, be removed, or investigated.

=== Support of Israel ===
In 2015, Tel Aviv celebrated its 40th Pride in an event organized by A Wider Bridge, an American LGBTQ organization that works to bridge the gap between North American and Israeli LGBTQ communities. The drew figures to attend from more than a dozen countries, and among them was Marsha Botzer and then Mayor of Seattle Ed Murray, an openly gay man. Members of Seattle's Boycott, Divestment and Sanctions movement accused Botzer and Murray of pinkwashing human rights violations of Palestinians by highlighting Israel's high standard of human rights enjoyed by LGBTQ Israelis. Before leaving for the trip, the protesters demanded that Murray cancel it, but he did not capitulate and included a statement in his address at the event defending his choice.

A legislative hearing held during the conference was the first time the Israeli legislative body ever took up the topic of transgender issues. Botzer gave a talk of personal testimony during this hearing. She told the press afterward that this presentation was different than the times she had spoken before any U.S. legislature; the difference was the reception and open emotion of the legislators. Botzer said that she did not give into the calls for boycott because she wanted to see the country for herself.

== Awards ==
- Greater Seattle Business Association Community Leader Award, 2002
- Virginia Prince Lifetime Achievement Award from the International Federation for Gender Education, 2004
- Horace Mann "Victories for Humanity" Award, 2004, from Antioch University
- Civil Rights Hero Award, 2006, from Lambda Legal
- Task Force Leadership Award, 2007
- Jose Julio Sierra Civil Rights Award, 2009
- Community Service award from Washington State LGBT Bar Association, 2011
- 2013's U.S. Trans 100 List
- Gay City Health Community Leadership Award, 2014
- Distinguished Scholar Award, 2015, from Antioch University Seattle
- William O. Douglas Award from the Washington State American Civil Liberties Union in 2016
- Dr. Robert Deisher Founders Award from Seattle Counseling Service, 2019

== Personal life ==
Botzer received gender confirming surgery in 1981 from Dr. Stanley Biber, the top surgical provider for the transexual community in the United States at the time.
