= Lavender Country =

American country music band

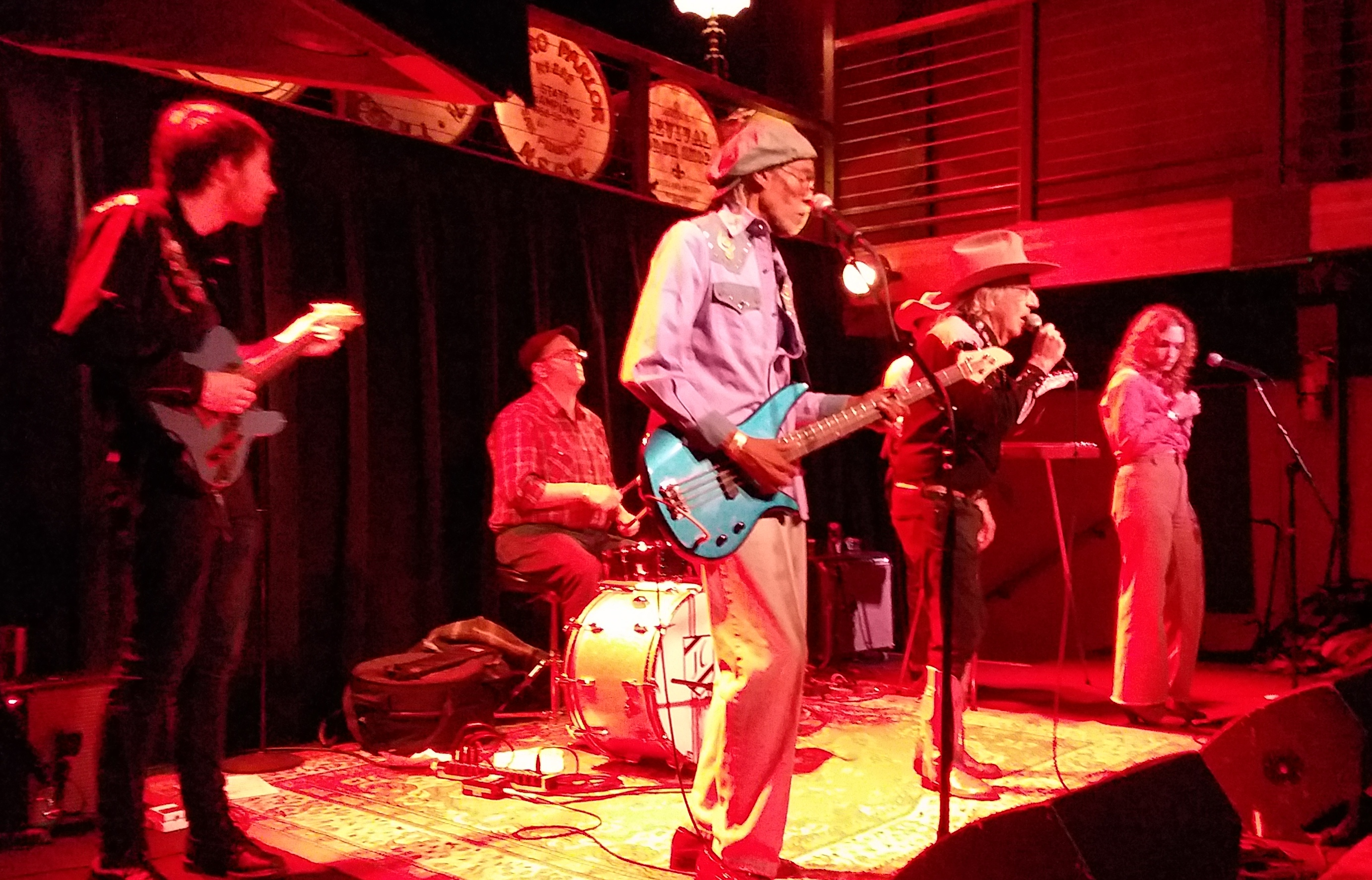
- Lavender Country at Mississippi Studios in Portland in 2020

Background information
- Origin: Seattle, Washington, United States
- Genres: Country, Americana
- Years active: 1972–1976; 1999–2000; 2014–2022
- Labels: Gay Community Social Services of Seattle, Paradise of Bachelors, Don Giovanni Records
- Past members: Michael Carr; Eve Morris; Patrick Haggerty; Melinda Cooper; Tami Allen; Claudette Boudreaux; Jack Moriarity; Bobby Innocente; Bobby Taylor; Robert Hammerstrom; Calvin Murasaki; Joyce Baker; Mya Byrne; Mark Newstetter; Paisley Fields; Jack Grelle

Lavender Country was an American country music band formed in 1972 whose self-titled 1973 album is the first known gay-themed album in country music history. Based in Seattle, Washington, the band originally consisted of lead singer and guitarist Patrick Haggerty (1944–2022), keyboardist Michael Carr, singer and fiddler Eve Morris and guitarist Robert Hammerstrom. Lavender Country has released two studio albums, Lavender Country (1973) and Blackberry Rose (2019). The band had many members based in various cities with Haggerty serving as the only constant member.

== History ==
=== Early years ===
Patrick Haggerty was born on September 27, 1944 and raised on a dairy farm near Port Angeles, Washington. His father Charles Edward Haggerty (1901–1961), was a dairy farmer, while his mother Asylda Mary (née Remillard) (1915–1999), was a homemaker, who later became a teacher following the death of her husband. Haggerty was the sixth of ten children. He has stated that his parents, particularly his father, were very accepting of his sexuality and effeminate personality, with his father encouraging him to come out and to not “sneak”. Haggerty attended Port Angeles Senior High in Port Angeles, Washington, from 1958 to 1962, where he was “pep promoter”, which was similar to being head cheerleader.

After college he joined the Peace Corps, but was discharged in 1966 for being gay. He later became an artist and an activist with the local chapter of the Gay Liberation Front after moving to Seattle to pursue graduate studies at the University of Washington. After coming out in 1969, Patrick became very involved with the gay rights movement, and became a socialist after "cutting cane" in Cuba in the early-1970s. He has two children, daughter Robin Boland (née Thetford) (a biological child with lesbian friend Lois Thetford), and son Amilcar Navarro (adopted and co-parented with his biological mother Linda Navarro). He has one grandchild, Maxwell Boland II. Haggerty was close friends with blues musician Blackberri, activists Faygele Ben-Miriam and Bobbi Campbell and gay film critic Paul Kagourtine. His son Amilcar is the grandson of jazz musician Fats Navarro.

==== Self-titled album ====
Their eponymous 1973 album was funded and released by Gay Community Social Services of Seattle, with funding and production assistance from activist Faygele Ben-Miriam. Just 1,000 copies of the album were pressed at the time of its original release. The band performed at the first Seattle Pride event in 1974, and performed at numerous pride and other LGBT events throughout Washington, Oregon and California until their dissolution in 1976.

==== FCC controversy ====
Shan Ottey, a DJ for Seattle radio station KRAB, played the band's song "Cryin' These Cocksucking Tears" on the air in 1973, resulting in Ottey's dismissal from the station. According to Seattle Weekly, Ottey's broadcasting license was revoked by the Federal Communications Commission (FCC). Ottey remained defiant that the song "should be played on the air" and soon returned to broadcasting.

=== Other activities ===
Haggerty was also a member of the gay country music group, Doug Stevens & The Outband, from 2001 to 2003, and later released one album with the gay country music group Pearl River in 2003, Live at the Grange Hall. Along with blues musician Bobby Taylor, Haggerty formed the duo, The Landlord Tenant Act in the early-2000s, and released two albums, a Johnny Cash tribute album, and an album of original music, titled Further Down The Road. Haggerty and Taylor also performed under the name Memory Lane, where they performed at nursing homes and seniors centres, mainly playing classic country, folk and pop standard songs from the 1940s and 1950s, and played around 50 shows a year. They still performed as of 2017.

=== Post-breakup activity ===
After disbanding Lavender Country in 1976, Haggerty ran two unsuccessful campaigns for political office, once for Seattle City Council and once as an independent candidate for a seat in the Washington House of Representatives, and continued to work as a gay rights and anti-racism activist.

In 1987, Haggerty began dating Julius "J.B." Broughton, an African American retired Navy man. They married in the mid-2000s and according to Haggerty in a 2018 interview with Robert L. Conway of Conway's Concast, they were still "madly and gayly in love".

=== Revival ===
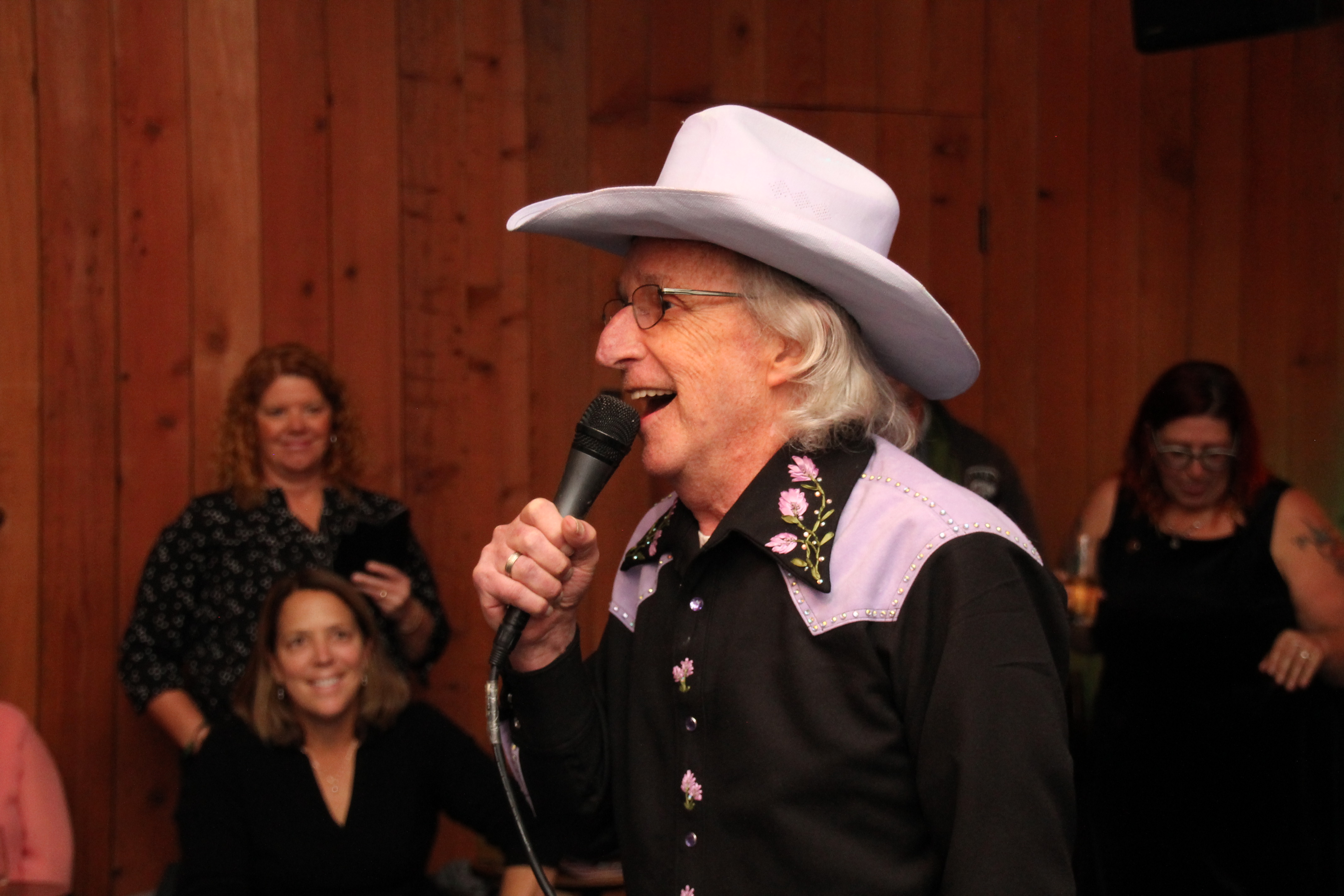
Patrick Haggerty performing with Lavender Country in Sonoma, California, in 2019

In 2000, the now-defunct Journal of Country Music published an article on gay country musicians, focusing in large part on Haggerty and Lavender Country. As a result of the renewed attention, the album was re-released on CD in December 1999, and in 2000 the band released a five-song EP, Lavender Country Revisited, which featured three re-recordings of songs from the original album and two new songs. The band reunited briefly in 2000, performing the album in its entirety at Seattle's Broadway Performance Hall in January 2000, and at that year's Seattle Pride. In addition, the album was archived at the Country Music Hall of Fame by former Journal of Country Music editor Chris Dickinson. Their song "Cryin' These Cocksucking Tears" was included in the 2012 compilation album Strong Love: Songs of Gay Liberation 1972–1981. The 1973 album was re-released on independent label Paradise of Bachelors in 2014, and the band have played several reunion shows in 2014 to support the reissue.

Haggerty recorded a story for StoryCorps about coming out to his father in 1959, which was adapted into the animated short film The Saint of Dry Creek in 2015. In 2016, director Dan Taberski directed a short film titled These C*cksucking Tears,which starred Haggerty and told the story of his life and career.

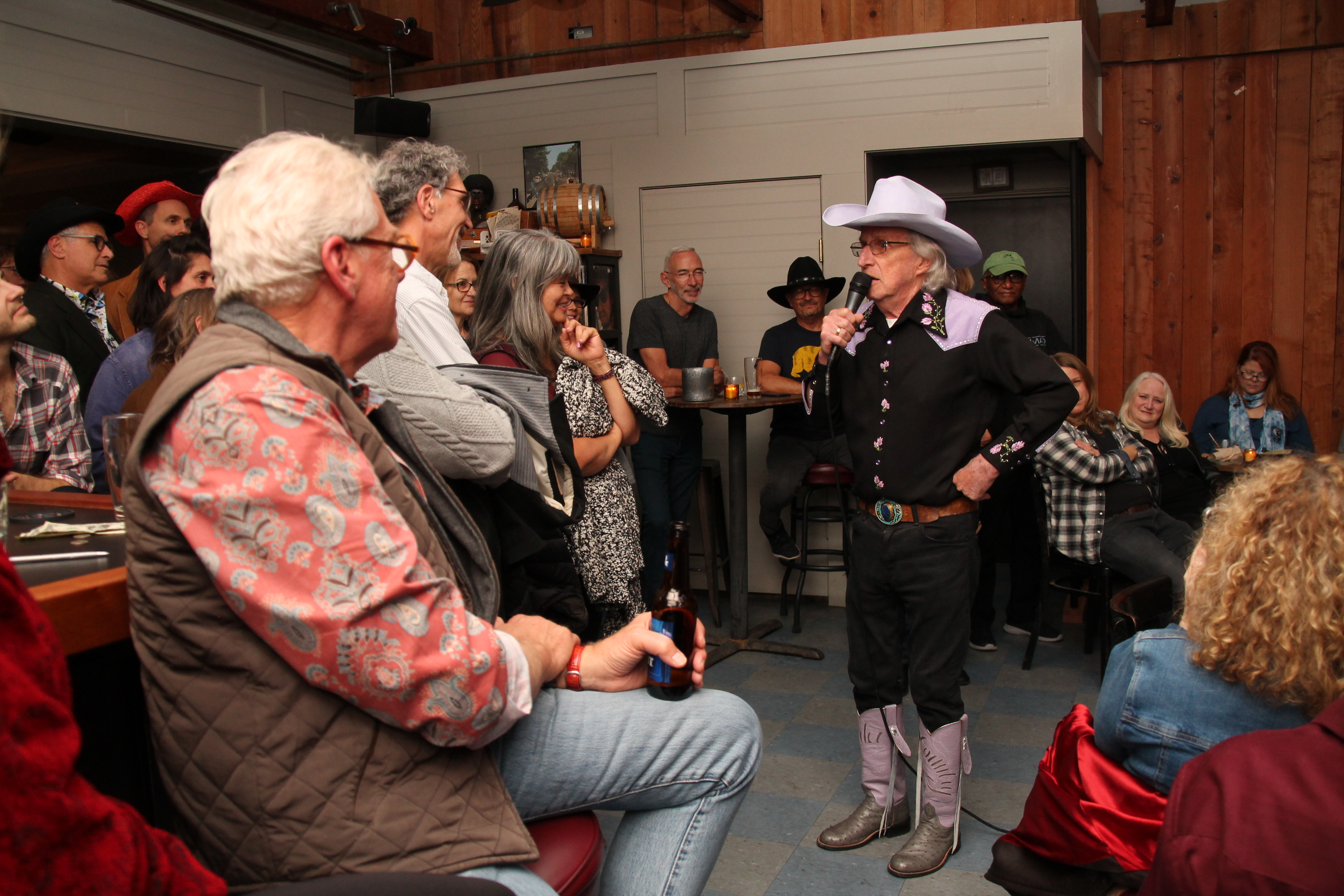
Patrick Haggerty performing live with Lavender Country in Sonoma, California, in 2019

In 2017 and again in 2019, Robert Dekkers' Post:Ballet company staged a modern ballet performance of Lavender Country, choreographed by Vanessa Thiessen and performed at the Z Space theater in San Francisco, including Patrick Haggerty performing live with a new Lavender Country band featuring guitarists Dennis Fortin and Mark Newstetter, violinist Calvin K. Murasaki, Mya Byrne on bass, Paisley Fields on piano and Joyce Baker on drums.

In 2019 the band released Blackberry Rose and Other Songs and Sorrows, their first full-length album of new material since 1973.

In 2020, Haggerty was featured in a version of Trixie Mattel's reprise of "I Can't Shake the Stranger Out of You", titled "Stranger" on her album Barbara. In 2020, Pat also hosted a YouTube series called "Aunt Patty's Lavender Hour", where he interviewed several people who influenced him in his life and musical journey, the guests included his son, filmmaker Amilcar Navarro, visual artist Pat Moriarity and filmmaker Dan Taberski, among others.

In January 2022, it was announced that the band's second album, Blackberry Rose would get a full release on Don Giovanni Records on February 18, 2022. Ahead of the album, the band released a new recording of "I Can’t Shake the Stranger Out of You" with a full band arrangement.

Haggerty died from complications of a stroke on October 31, 2022, at the age of 78.

== Critical reception ==
Lavender Country's self-titled first album Lavender Country was described by Pitchfork upon its reissue in 2014 as "...wobbly and amateurish, but in a playful, 'come on y'all' sort of way."

Blackberry Rose has been described as "full of twang, sometimes funny, often quirky, and not very tight musically (in a Grateful Dead kind of way)." Pitchfork's Jason Greene describes Lavender Country's sound as unchanged from their first album to their second, saying, "Haggerty returns to recording virtually unchanged: His voice, which was unaffected and childlike in its simplicity in 1973, is unaffected and childlike in 2022."

== Discography ==
- 1973 – Lavender Country
- 1999 – Lavender Country (reissue)
- 2000 – Lavender Country Revisited
- 2014 – Lavender Country (reissue released by Paradise of Bachelors)
- 2019 – Blackberry Rose and Other Songs and Sorrows
- 2022 – Blackberry Rose (reissue released by Don Giovanni Records).
