= Faygele Ben-Miriam =

American LGBT activist (1944–2000)

- Born: John F. Singer; October 21, 1944; New York City, U.S.
- Died: June 5, 2000 (aged 55)
- Education: City College of New York
- Occupation: Activist
- Known for: Filing one of the first gay marriage lawsuits in American history

Faygele Ben-Miriam (born John F. Singer: October 21, 1944, in New York City – June 5, 2000) was a U.S. activist, particularly for LGBT rights, and a gay marriage pioneer, filing one of the first gay marriage lawsuits in American history after being denied a marriage license at the King County Administration Building in Seattle, Washington, in 1971.

== Biography ==
Singer was born in New York City to Jewish parents of Lithuanian and Polish background Irving and Miriam Singer. He and his two younger brothers Michael and Thomas and his younger sister Judith were raised in a non-religious, politically aware household in Mount Vernon, New York. He came out to his parents in 1963 or 1964, to the initial consternation and eventual acceptance of his mother and the long-running anger of his father.

He served as a VISTA volunteer for civil-rights causes in the mid-1960s, applied for conscientious-objector status and served as an Army medic in Germany. Studying at City College of New York, he received his liberal arts degree in 1970. Later that year, he left for San Francisco and, later, went to Seattle.

On September 20, 1971, Singer and fellow activist Paul Barwick applied for a marriage license at the King County Administration Building in Seattle, not being keen on actually getting married but wanting "to make a point about having the same rights as heterosexuals." Their request was refused by then-county auditor (later County Assessor) Lloyd Hara. They were among the first same-sex couples in the United States to apply for a marriage license, causing a flurry of media coverage and leading to a lawsuit, Singer v. Hara, which ended in 1974 with a unanimous rejection by the Washington State Court of Appeals.

Singer worked as a typist for the Equal Employment Opportunity Commission, but his taste for women's clothing and his open disclosure of his homosexuality resulted in him being fired after one year in 1972, despite the protests of co-workers. He sued the EEOC with the help of the American Civil Liberties Union, and the Ninth Circuit Court of Appeals ruled in his favor in 1974, with the U.S. Supreme Court remanding the case back to the Ninth Circuit, essentially instructing it to rule in ben Miriam's favor, resulting in his receiving back pay from the entire span of the lawsuit. The suit also resulted in the EEOC enforcing prohibitions against discrimination on the basis of sexual preference. While Ben-Miriam did not go back to the EEOC, he took up a job with the U.S. Department of Labor, from which he retired in 1995.

In 1973, Singer changed his name to Faygele Ben-Miriam, Faygele being the Yiddish word for "little bird", used both as a woman's first name and a derogatory Yiddish term for "faggot", "ben" meaning "son of" in Hebrew and Yiddish, and Miriam being his mother's name, to honor his mother, thus stressing both his Jewish and his gay identity.

Ben-Miriam also participated in the Radical Faeries in Wolf Creek, Oregon and for a while published RFD, virtually single-handedly. He was active on the National Board of the New Jewish Agenda, worked with the International Jewish Peace Union and was active in Kadima of Seattle.

In 1987 Ben-Miriam took part in the Lesbian and Gay March on Washington, D.C.

He died on June 5, 2000, at the age of 55. According to his sister, he died of lung cancer (he had been a heavy smoker) which metastasized to his brain. Although he had been HIV positive for several years, he did not die of AIDS, a fact which, again according to his sister, annoyed him: he would have preferred that his death be as political as his life.

According to friends of Ben-Miriam, Ronni Gilboa and Patrick Haggerty, he did not want to be here, yet never attempted suicide. Quoted from a StoryCorps episode discussing their friend Ben-Miriam "You know, he told me for decades, ‘I don’t want to be here. I don’t want to be on this earth. This is an ugly place.’ The society that we lived in compared to the society that he wished to build were so far apart."

Ben-Miriam helped found the Gay Community Social Services of Seattle and also produced the first gay country music album, Lavender Country.

== See also ==
- Timeline of same-sex marriage
