= Mineo Katagiri =

Mineo Katagiri (August 1, 1919 – November 15, 2005) was a Japanese-American social activist for racial equality, and a minister for the United Church of Christ.

== Early life ==
Katagiri was born in Haleiwa, Hawaii on August 1, 1919.

As a student at the University of Hawaiʻi he was elected president of the university YMCA. He graduated in 1941 and went on to earn a degree in theology from the Union Theological Seminary in 1944.

== Career ==
After he graduated, Katagiri worked with labor union leaders to unite white, black, and Japanese American workers at Seabrook Farms, where Japanese Americans who were released from internment camps worked while they were transitioning back into society. After that, Katagiri taught at Doshisha University.

In 1959 he moved to Seattle and was the campus minister at the University of Washington. In 1969 he started the Asian Coalition for Equality. The goal of the coalition was to bring Asian-Americans together to fight intolerance and advocate for civil rights alongside African Americans. Katagiri also advocated for LGBT rights throughout his career.

He then moved to New York City in 1970 to serve as the director of mission priorities for the United Church of Christ. He was head of the church's Northern California Conference from 1975 to 1984. During that time he worked with Angel Taglucop and Erasto Arenas to establish ministries in San Francisco's Filipino community.

Katagiri died in 2005 after a fall while golfing.
