= Gay Women's Alliance =

Seattle-based lesbian feminist group

The Gay Women's Alliance was a Seattle-based lesbian feminist group founded in 1971.

== Founding ==
In 1971, Pandora, a Seattle publication covering lesbian feminist issues announced that women from the Gay Liberation Front had held a meeting to discuss how the gay liberation movement could serve the interests of gay women and sought to form a group. The Gay Women's Alliance, known as the GWA, was founded two weeks later.

== Gay Women’s Resource Center ==
In 1971, the Gay Women's Alliance opened a Gay Women's Resource Center at the YWCA, where they provided sober social activities and maintained a list of lesbian-friendly businesses within Seattle. The name would later be changed to the Lesbian Resource Center.
