= Meningeal syphilis =

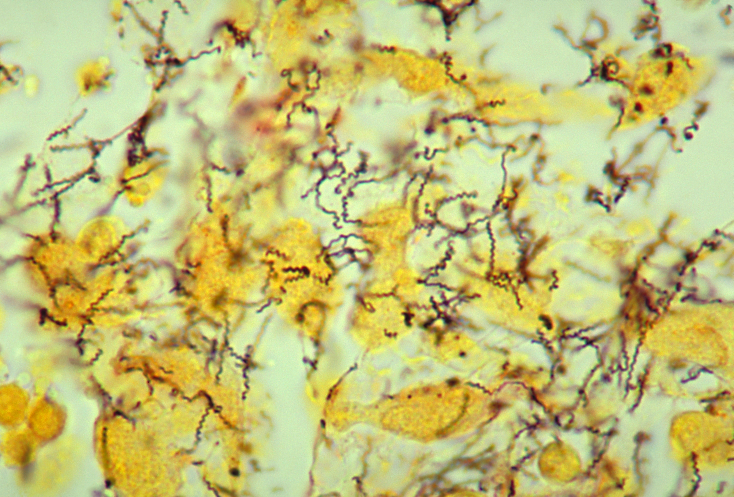
- Treponema pallidum 01
- Specialty: Infectious diseases

Meningeal syphilis (as known as syphilitic aseptic meningitis or meningeal neurosyphilis) is a chronic form of syphilis infection that affects the central nervous system. Treponema pallidum, a spirochate bacterium, is the main cause of syphilis, which spreads drastically throughout the body and can infect all its systems if not treated appropriately. Treponema pallidum is the main cause of the onset of meningeal syphilis and other treponemal diseases, and it consists of a cytoplasmic and outer membrane that can cause a diverse array of diseases in the central nervous system and brain.

Early symptomatic neurosyphilis (or acute syphilitic meningitis or neurorecurrence) is the onset of meningeal syphilis. The symptoms arise as a result of inflamed meninges, which eventually lead up to signs of meningitis.

Treponema pallidum invades the nervous system within three to eighteen months after the primary infection. The initial series of events is asymptomatic meningitis, which can remain in the human body system and produce more damage within the body. Every form of neurosyphilis has meningitis as a component; however, every case differs in severity. The individual is infected with syphilis through a gram negative bacteria that only humans can obtain. Syphilis has four stages of infection, which are primary, secondary, latent, and tertiary. If syphilis is not treated, the disease can affect various other systems in the body, including the brain, heart, and vessels. The infection of the heart and vessels leads to meningovascular syphilis, which is usually presented during the secondary stage of syphilis. If syphilis is prolonged, it can affect the nervous system, which is known as neurosyphilis. Meningeal syphilis is a component of neurosyphilis, which usually occurs in the tertiary stage of syphilis.

== Signs and symptoms ==
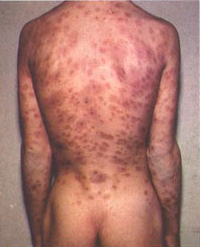
Syphilis lesions on back

=== Asymptomatic ===
- asymptomatic invasion of the central nervous system by Treponema is common within a few months of primary infection

=== General symptoms of meningeal syphilis ===
- symptoms of meningitis can occur at any time after the infection
- however, it usually appears within two years
- symptoms may include headache, stiff neck, cranial nerve palsies, convulsions, and mental confusion
- patient is afebrile

=== General symptoms of neurosyphilis ===
- Personality change
- Ataxia
- Stroke
- Visual Impairment
- Bladder incontinence
- Hearing Loss
- Seizures
- Headache

=== General signs of neurosyphilis ===
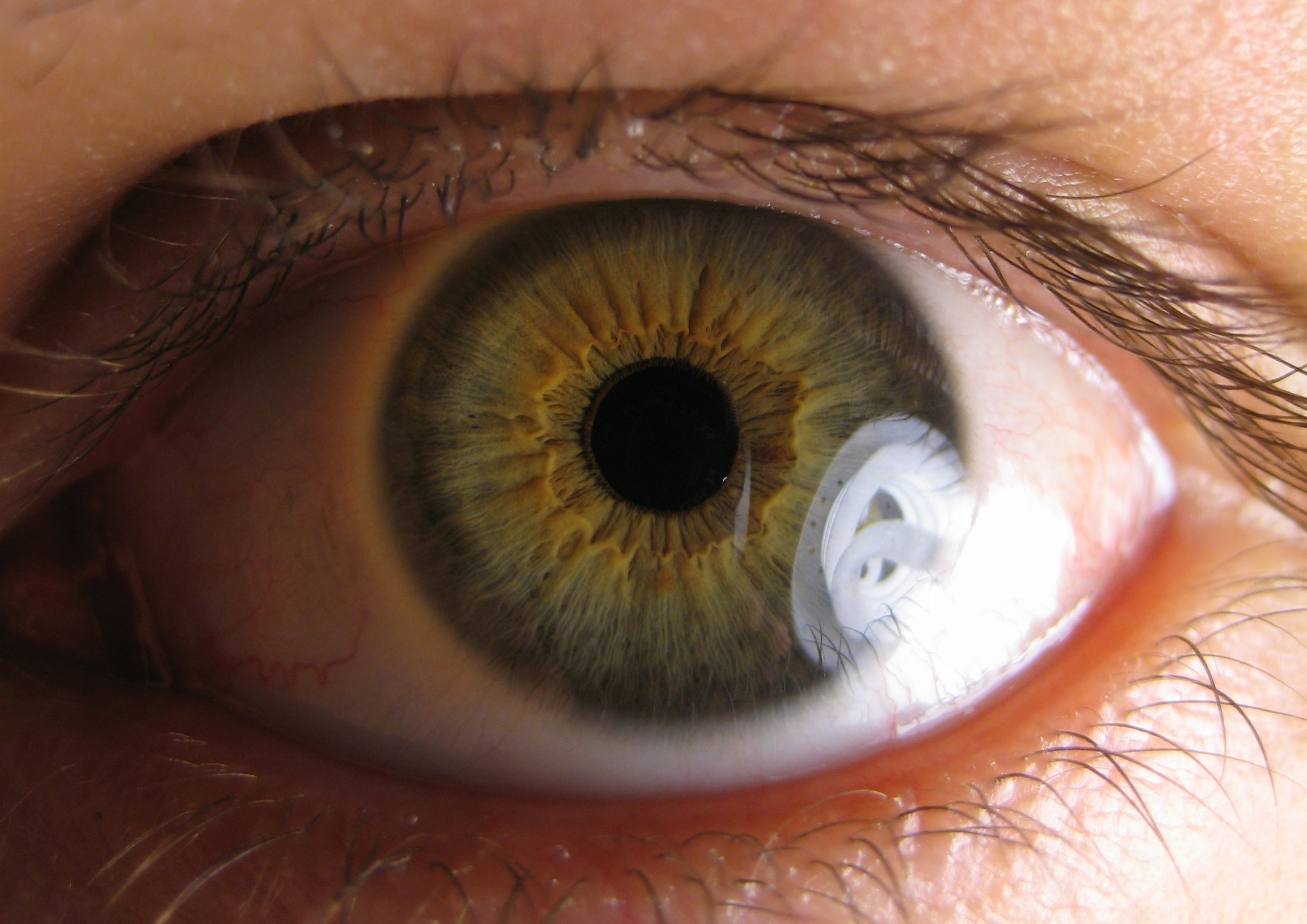
Argyll Robertson Pupil constriction

- Hyporeflexia
- Sensory impairment
- Dementia
- Mania
- Charcot Joint
- Hypotonia
- Optic Atrophy
- Argyll Robertson pupil
  - Argyll Robertson pupil constricts with accommodation but it is not reactive to light
  - This sign is usually evident in the tertiary stage of syphilis

=== Clinical features ===
The types of neurosyphilis include asymptomatic, acute syphilitic meningitis, meningovascular syphilis, parenchymatous syphilis (which includes general paresis and tabes dorsalis), and optic atrophy.

== Anatomy of disease ==
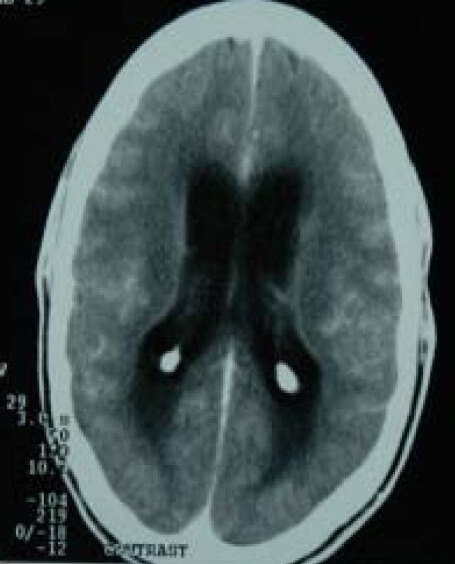
Brain with meningitis

Meningitis inflames and breaks down any protective membrane and cells surrounding the brain, spinal cord, and other parts of the nervous system. Bacterial meningitis is normally caused by a bacterial infection that enters the bloodstream and enters the blood–brain barrier. The blood–brain barrier consists of tight junctions. These tight junctions help to enclose endothelial cells that line the brain capillaries. Only certain water-soluble substances can move across the blood–brain barrier, while lipid-soluble substances can easily move across the blood–brain barrier. However, when any form of bacteria gets through to the blood–brain barrier, a bacterial infection can result in the cerebrospinal fluid.

This fluid circulates through the brain and spinal cord, and it is produced in the choroid plexuses. The meninges consists of three connective tissues that cover the spinal cord and brain. They are lined with vertebral cavities, which is used as protection for the central nervous system. When the cerebrospinal fluid is infected, the meninges become inflamed and can start to deteriorate. This inflammation of the membranes causes meningitis.

== Pathophysiology ==
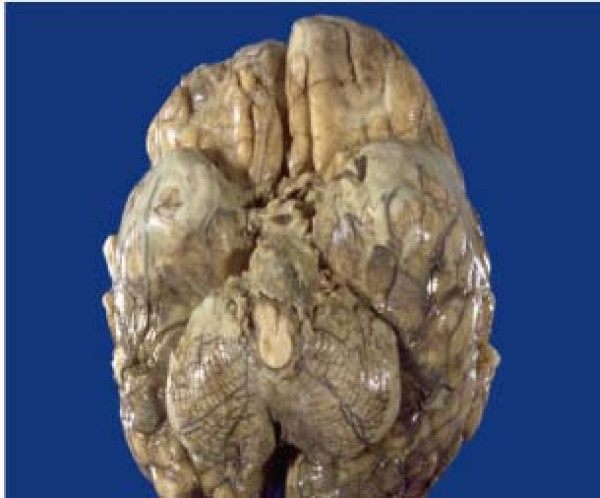
Autopsy of brain with meningitis

Syphilis is a sexually transmitted infection that is brought upon by the gram negative bacteria, Treponema pallidum. Treponema pallidum are various spiral shaped motile bacteria of the family spirochaetaceae. Their genus features include spirochetes, which means that they are spiral with axial filaments (endoflagellum). These bacteria are poorly visible on Gram stain, but they have a gram-negative envelope. Some distinguishing features of the bacteria include a thin spirochete, which is not reliably seen on gram stain. The bacteria's outer membrane has endotoxin-like lipids. Their axial filaments consists of endoflagella and periplasmic flagella. The creatures cannot be cultured in lab, and they are an obligate pathogen. Humans are the only host for this bacteria, and the bacteria can get through the body by minute abrasions of the skin or mucous membranes. The reservoir is in the human genital tract, and its transmission is transmitted sexually or across the placenta.

=== Stages of disease ===
The four main stages of syphilis are the primary, secondary, latent, and tertiary stages:

==== Primary stage ====
The first sign of syphilis can occur during the first few weeks of exposure. This exposure in particular is caused by the spirochete, Treponema pallidum. Usually within two to twelve weeks, a red, circular sore (which is known as a chancre) is present where the bacteria first entered the body. There may be multiple sores that are not visible on the body, and they are usually difficult to find. Commonly, these chancres are visible on the penis, anus, rectum, vagina, and cervix; however, they are usually difficult to identify even though it is a localized disease. The sores may go undetected, and it may only be identified after getting tested. The lesion does not induce any pain; however, it can lead to an ulcer that can secrete mucus, swelling, or tenderness in the infected area. These lesions can be healed without treatment within one to two months of exposure. The diagnosis can include dark-field or fluorescent microscopy of lesion; however, fifty percent of patients will be negative by nonspecific serology. If the infected individual does not treat the infection properly, the syphilis can progress to the secondary stage.

==== Secondary stage ====
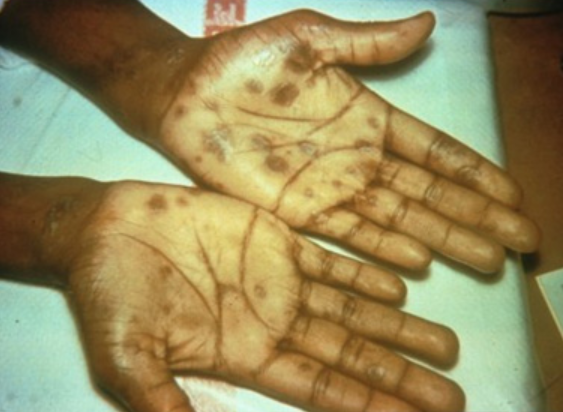
Secondary syphilis-palmar rash

The secondary stages of syphilis persists to be more dangerous to the systems of the human body. The disseminated disease can cause constitutional symptoms and condylomata lata. Many treponemes are present in chancres in the primary stage; however, condylomata lata is usually present in the secondary stage. The pathogen can spread through blood, which can infect the vessels in the body. The infection of the heart, muscles, and vessels in the body can lead to meningovascular syphilis. Generally, rashes may start developing on the hands and soles of the feet, and it can spread to various parts of skin on the body. Other symptoms may include sore throat, headache, joint pain, fever, and patches of hair loss. As in stage one, lesions may start to form on the body, but in this stage in particular, lesions are found in mucous membranes of the mouth, throat, bones, and internal organs. Also common with stage one, the symptoms and signs of secondary syphilis will go away with or without treatment and medication. The diagnosis includes serology nonspecific and specific, both positive. The secondary stage is however highly infectious because the bacteria is spreading drastically throughout the body.

==== Latent stage ====
The latent stage is the asymptomatic stage, which includes two phases. The two phases of the asymptomatic stage include early (within one year of exposure and infection) and late(after one year of exposure and infection). In this stage, the bacteria can remain inactive for three to thirty years, and it may not progress to the tertiary stage of syphilis, which is the final stage. This stage is highly dangerous because the symptoms altogether disappear and remain hidden for a prolonged period of time. The diagnosis of this stage is positive serology. Because the bacteria remains inactive, the late latent syphilis does not spread and is noninfectious.

==== Tertiary stage ====
The tertiary stage is known as the final stage of syphilis or "late" syphilis. This deadly stage starts after three years of exposure and infection to syphilis. Typically, the person is no longer contagious with the disease, but the gram-negative bacteria in the body can reactivate, reproduce, multiply, and spread drastically throughout the body. At this point, the infection spreads to all the systems in the human body, including the nervous system, bones, eyes, and heart. Neurosyphilis at this point can cause several damages to the body, including tabes dorsalis. When the nervous system is infected at this particular stage, the individual is at risk for meningeal syphilis, which in turn slowly shuts down the entire body. The tertiary stages can also cause the growth of many tumors, and lead to cancerous effects in the body. This stage can be diagnosed through specific tests in serology. The nonspecific tests may be negative. At this point, there is little treatment the individual can pursue, and the body shuts down as a whole.

== Diagnosis ==
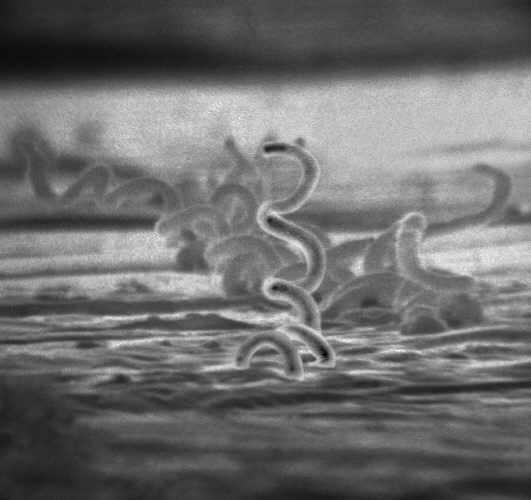
Treponema pallidum

There are several methods to diagnose meningeal syphilis. One of the most common ways include visualizing the organisms by immunofluorescence and dark field microscopy. Dark field microscopy initially had the finding that the spirochete has a corkscrew appearance and that it is spirillar and gram (-) bacteria. Another method would also be through the screening test and serology. Serology includes two types of antibody test: Nontreponemal antibody test and Treponemal antibody test (specific test). The Nontreponemal antibody test screens with VDRL (Venereal Disease Research Lab) and RPR (Rapid Plasma Reagin). The Treponemal antibody test (specific test) confirms with FTA-ABS (Fluorescent treponemal antibody-absorption). Brain imaging and MRI scans may be used when diagnosing patients; however, they do not prove to be as effective as specific tests. Specific tests for treponemal antibody are typically more expensive because the earliest antibodies bind to spirochetes. These tests are usually more specific and remain positive in patients with other treponemal diseases.

=== Cerebrospinal fluid (CSF) findings ===
- Pressure may be normal or raised
- Fluid is clear
- Protein is elevated (100–200 mg%)
- Sugar is normal
- Cell count is elevated and is lymphocytic
- Gamma globulin levels are elevated
- VDRL and TPHA (Treponema pallidum haemagglutination) are positive

== Prevention ==
There are many different forms on prevention of syphilis and other sexually transmitted infections in general. Prevention of syphilis includes avoiding contact of bodily fluids with an infected person. This can be particularly difficult because syphilis is usually transmitted by people who are unaware that they have the disease because they do not have any visible sores or rashes that may denote having an infection in general. Being abstinent or having mutually monogamous sex with a person who is uninfected with any type of sexually transmitted infection is the greatest guarantee of not becoming infected with syphilis or any form of a sexually transmitted infection. Using latex condoms can however reduce the risk of obtaining syphilis. In order to prevent further contamination to other individuals, benzathine penicillin is given to any contacts. Washing, douching, or urinating cannot prevent the transmission of a sexually transmitted infection in general. Individuals obtain syphilis through a variety of circumstances. In general, syphilis can be transmitted from individual to individual through direct contact with sores that are present on the external genitals, vagina, rectum, anus, lips, or mouth. Transmission can occur through any form of sexual contact, including vaginal, anal, oral, and manual sex. In addition, women who are pregnant and infected with syphilis can transmit the disease onto their child as well. If transmission has occurred, it is important to check up immediately with a physician to avoid further damage.

== Treatment ==
The penicillin backbone, with variable group highlighted

=== Penicillin ===
The most popular treatment forms for any type of syphilis uses penicillins, which have been effective treatments used since the 1940s. Other forms also include benzathine penicillin, which is usually used for primary and secondary syphilis (it has no resistance to penicillin however). Benzathine penicillin is used for long acting form, and if conditions worsen, penicillin G is used for late syphilis.

=== Jarisch–Herxheimer reaction ===
The Jarisch–Herxheimer reaction, which is the response to the body after endotoxins are released by the death of harmful organisms in the human body, starts usually during the first day of antibiotic treatment. The reaction increases the person's body temperature, decreases the overall blood pressure (both systolic and diastolic levels), and results in leukopenia and rigors in the body. This reaction can occur during any treatment of spirochete diseases.

It is important to realize that syphilis can recur. An individual who has had the disease once, even if it has been treated, does not prevent the person from experiencing recurrence of syphilis. Individuals can be re-infected, and because syphilis sores can be hidden, it may not be obvious that the individual is infected with syphilis. In these cases, it is vital to become tested and treated immediately to reduce spread of the infection.
