= Ingersoll Gender Center =

American non-profit organization

- Formation: 1977
- Founder: Marsha C. Botzer
- Founded at: Seattle
- Tax ID no.: 91-1262502
- Legal status: 501(c)3
- Headquarters: Seattle Counseling Service
- Board of directors: Marsha Botzer, Jessica Jones, Brandon Chun
- Website: ingersollgendercenter.org

Ingersoll Gender Center is an American non-profit organization based in Seattle that provides peer-led support groups, advocacy and community organization for transgender and gender non-conforming people in the Puget Sound region. It is one of the oldest organizations serving said community in the United States.

== History ==
Ingersoll was founded in 1977 by Marsha C. Botzer and gained non-profit status in 1984. One of the reasons Botzer has cited for founding the organization is a problem of joblessness and underemployment of transgender people. Botzer is quoted in the 2021 book Going to Trinidad by journalist Martin J. Smith that in the early years of the center she would tuck Ingersoll Center business cards between the pages of books in the Seattle Public Library's small collection of books on the subject of gender as an attempt to get the word out about the center's services in the pre-Internet era. The primary service provided by Ingersoll is support groups led by local transgender and gender non-conforming people for their peers who are in need of support. Another service the organization provides is helping individuals access gender affirming healthcare and navigate their health insurance. The center has also worked with people who have been through conversion therapy in and around the Seattle region before a law was passed in 2016 that outlawed the practice within the city.

In 2012, the organization launched a program for vocational support called Seattle Transgender Economic Empowerment Project (STEEP). Botzer joined a Seattle LGBTQ task force under Mayor Ed Murray, and in 2015 the task force proposed city-wide legislation requiring that all single-occupancy restrooms be available as all gender restrooms. Later that year the proposal was made law as the All Gender Restroom Ordinance. This made Seattle one of the first U.S. cities to enact such a law. The law and other local ordinances in Washington state were contested on a state-wide level when a voter initiative was created to ban such laws within the state. Ingersoll Gender Center lobbied in favor of the law and the rights of local municipalities during this time.

After Donald Trump became President of the United States, Ingersoll Gender Center started publishing annual voter's guides with the first being for 2017.

At the start of 2017, University of Washington School of Medicine launched a program to focus on training doctors in LGBTQ+ healthcare with collaboration and consulting from the gender center.

The group lobbied for Washington state to allow the gender marker "X" option on driver's licenses and identification cards, which became state policy in November 2019. The organization has also worked with local real estate developers on an affordable housing project in the historically LGBTQ Capitol Hill neighborhood for seniors. Also in 2019, Botzer was appointed to a King County Council task force as a representative of Ingersoll Gender Center. The purpose of the task force was to "spread awareness and understanding of gender nonconforming individuals and their experience with county departments and facilities".

In 2020, the organization launched COVID-19 response programs to assist the communities it serves with issues brought on or exacerbated by the pandemic. Part of the city of Seattle's early relief efforts was to distribute grocery store vouchers to residents who had lost work due to the pandemic. The city gave some vouchers to organizations, including Ingersoll Gender Center, to distribute within their communities to impacted families and individuals.

In 2021 the Seattle Police Department was banned from participating in Capitol Hill Seattle Pride's march, and some gay cops said that they felt excluded from the Pride event. Botzer suggested a potential strategy to create solidarity between police and the LGBT community would be for the police department to hire more transgender cops, which she argued would reduce the accounts of police violence against transgender people.

== Controversies ==
=== Human Rights Campaign Transgender Framework ===
In 2019 the Human Rights Campaign (HRC) made an announcement of a new "trans-centered" framework, making transgender issues a priority for the organization for the first time. Dozens of transgender activists and organizations wrote an open letter of criticism and concern over this announcement. The letter said that the HRC was a cisgender-led organization that was co-opting ideas and efforts made by transgender (and especially trans people of color) activists. Two leaders of Ingersoll Gender Center signed this letter.

=== Response to the murder of George Floyd ===
Ingersoll Gender Center signed on with over 100 other American LGBT organizations to condemn racism in policing and police brutality following the murder of George Floyd.

=== Internal issues of racism ===
On March 12, 2021 about a dozen present and former staff of Ingersoll came together as Ingersoll Collective Action and released a petition on actionnetwork.org alleging racist and abusive working conditions within the organization. The collective self-identified as Black, persons of color, transgender, and disabled current and former employees. The petition included a list of allegations and demanded the resignations of Executive Director Karter Booher, Program Director Jonathan Lee Williams, and Operations Director Louis Mitchell. Other demands included a public apology, an investigation to be performed, and that racial equity consultants be brought into the organization. Evelyn Chow, a member of Ingersoll Collective Action who was also the company's economic justice manager at the time told the South Seattle Emerald that the local community of transgender people of color had known of a history of problems within Ingersoll for years before the petition was created. An impetus for making the concerns public in March 2021 was that a Black Ingersoll employee felt their work in the support of Washington Senate Bill 5313 was being downplayed and misattributed.

Several other nonprofit organizations working in a similar space to Ingersoll made public statements in support of the petition. Among these were Queer the Land, Trans Women of Color Solidarity Network, Pride Foundation, Alphabet Alliance of Color, Seattle Pride, and Gender Justice League.

The board of Ingersoll Gender Center responded in a public statement and pledged to conduct an investigation on March 17, 2021. Ingersoll Collective Action published a response to their request for transparency with the investigation to their website, which said that the center had hired Onik’a Gilliam-Cathcart from the Seattle law firm Helsell Fetterman. However on March 23, Ingersoll Collective Action made another public post stating their disappointment with the response from the organization to date. On March 26 the center announced to their staff that all staff and contractors would be receiving two weeks of paid time off starting April 3, 2021 and that Gilliam-Cathcart would be reaching out to current staff during that period as a part of the investigation. On April 16, Ingersoll announced that Karter Booher and Louis Mitchell were resigning for personal reasons and their departure would be effective June 1, 2021.

== Awards ==
- Greater Seattle Business Association Nonprofit of the Year 2015
