= Seattle Initiative 13 =

1978 ballot measure

Initiative 13 was a 1978 initiative in Seattle, Washington, United States. One of its effects would have been to repeal city ordinances which protected housing rights and employment for gay and lesbian people. Another would have been to close the city Office of Women's Rights.

Seattle Pride in 1978 included protests against the initiative. Multiple organizations also protested the initiative.

Walt Crowley was one of the protest campaign organizers. On November 7, 1978, voters rejected the initiative by a 2–1 margin.
