= South Seattle Emerald =

American nonprofit local news website

- Founder(s): Marcus Harrison Green, Bridgette Hempstead
- President: Michael McPhearson
- Managing editor: Rosette Royale
- Headquarters: Seattle, Washington
- Website: southseattleemerald.org

The South Seattle Emerald is Southern Seattle’s only nonprofit, reader-supported, and community operated media and news outlet. It is an online newspaper that is focused on Seattle's South End Neighborhoods, South King County, Washington, and stories throughout the regions that are important to BIPOC and working class people.

The paper relies on community volunteers, both writers and photographers to report the news. It largely utilizes BIPOC authors.

== History ==
The South Seattle Emerald was founded in Spring 2014 as a free nonprofit online publication, and it has remained in that form as of May 2021. It was founded to counter missing coverage and negative media portrayals of South Seattle, seeking to give the region an explicit voice. As its founder put it, the paper sought to show that the South End “is more than just the crime section in the Seattle Times.” The Emerald has focused on supporting reporting that might not get published in more traditional media outlets and providing a platform for journalists of color.

Marcus Harrison Green founded the paper, with Bridgette Hempstead serving on the board and Green paying for writers and photographers from his own funds. Devin Chicras became president of the board after a few months, developing the Emerald's branding, running HR and accounting.

The team remained small into the pandemic, but its revenue grew due to donations and grants, and by 2021, the paper averaged 40 contributing photographers, writers, and artists each month. Other work was done by editors like Sharon Ho Chang and Sharon Maeda, volunteers, and board members. In May 2023, Green hired Michael McPhearson to take over his role as executive director. McPhearson became the paper's first full-time employee. McPhearson was succeeded by Florangela Davila in February 2025, who had previously been a board member. In 2025, Davila and managing editor Rosette Royale were the Emerald's two full-time employees.

In 2025, Davila and Green received Real Change's Editorial Excellence Award for their work with the South Seattle Emerald.

== Community partnerships ==
The South Seattle Emerald partnered with The International Examiner to create content to address Anti-Asian Racism. The project ran from January through August 2022, and comprised both literary and visual art.

Starting in 2021, the South Seattle Emerald has been partnering with Pongo Poetry to publish one poem by a young author each month. In 2022 Washington State's Echo Glenn Youth Facility partnered with Pongo Poetry to bring a creative writing program to their young inmates. Three poems written by young people incarcerated in Echo Glenn had been published in the South Seattle Emerald by that July.

== Publications ==
The South Seattle Emerald has published two anthologies of their reporting, Emerald Reflections: A South Seattle Emerald Anthology (both 1 & 2).

The first anthology was published with Third Place Press, with over half of it containing poetry, and other sections for art and prose. The poems represent many themes and locations in Seattle, while the prose mostly covers topics on race. Paul Constant, in a review for The Seattle Review of Books, labeled the anthology "a mission statement for the Emerald, and for the city that it represents," raising important local conversations about "space and bodies and history and prejudice."

== Focus on Racial Justice ==
According to founder Marcus Harrison Green, the journalism that put the Emerald on the map was their coverage of the No New Youth Jail movement. It is an abolitionist movement focused on King County's plan to build a new Children and Family Justice Center to incarcerate youth.

The Emerald has been a pivotal publication during Seattle's Black Lives Matter movement, and other anti-racist movements in the region. During the occupation of Seattle's Capitol Hill Neighborhood during the George Floyd Uprising, The South Seattle Emerald is where organizers posted their perspective. The Emerald also published on-the-ground reporting covering the CHOP and the city's response to it.

The South Seattle Emerald is also where anti-caste activists published their case for the importance of anti-caste legislation in Seattle, days before a city ordinance was passed.
