= King County Administration Building =

Coordinates: 47°36′11″N 122°19′46″W

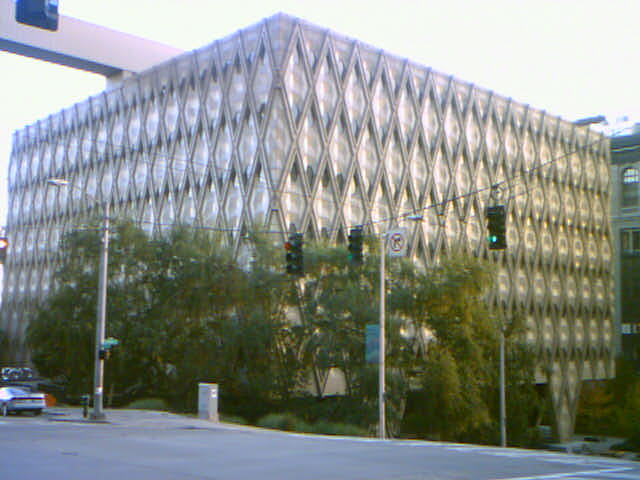
King Country Administration Building with hexagonal theme

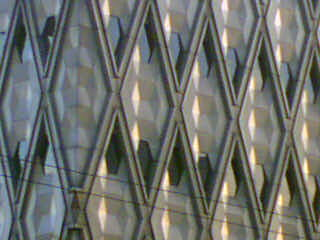
Hexagon window openings

The King County Administration Building is a nine-story office building located in Seattle, the seat of King County, Washington, United States. Completed in 1971, the building is located at 500 Fourth Avenue, between Jefferson Street and James Street, and parking is available in parking garages on all surrounding streets. Designed by the Harmon, Pray and Detrich architectural firm, it features a unique hexagonal, honeycomb theme in its walls and windows. The building also has underground tunnels that connect to the adjacent King County Courthouse and Chinook Building.

The plaza surrounding the building was the site of a five-month protest by homeless people opposed to funding cuts for a homeless non-profit organization in 2016.

The building was rendered mostly vacant in 2020 as the county government adopted remote work for most of its employees during the COVID-19 pandemic. With increasing maintenance costs and significant renovation work needed, the county ultimately announced in April 2022 that it would fully vacate and shutter the building by the end of the year, despite having no plans for the building's future. A proposal to demolish the building as part of a civic campus redevelopment program was announced by County Executive Dow Constantine in 2023. The Administration Building became the temporary home of the county's short-term sobering center in July 2026 and reopened to office use in September 2026 to accommodate a return-to-office mandate signed by County Executive Girmay Zahilay.

== Agencies ==
Several agencies were located in the Administration Building, including:

- Archives and Records Management
- Assessor's Office
- Facilities Management
- Marriage Licensing
- Recorder's Office
- Vehicle Licensing
- Prosecuting Attorney
- King County Sheriff's Office Criminal Investigation Division
