= Coping Cookies =

Bakery in Seattle, Washington, U.S.

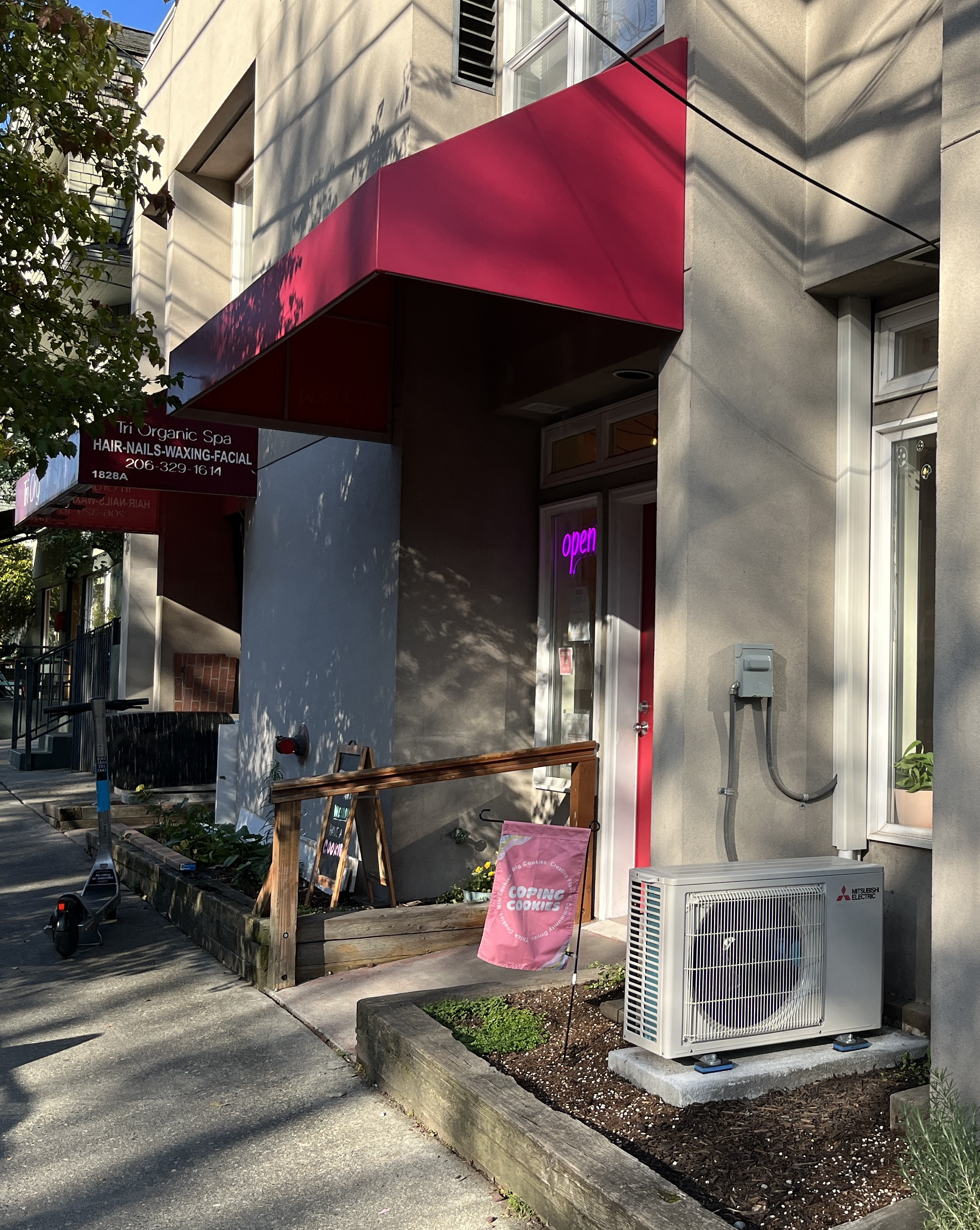
- The bakery's exterior, 2023
- Interactive map of Coping Cookies

Restaurant information
- Owners: Ashley Hernandez; Sam Padilla
- Location: Seattle, King, Washington, United States
- Coordinates: 47.61844°N 122.31671°W

Coping Cookies was a bakery and dessert shop on Seattle's Capitol Hill, in the U.S. state of Washington.

== Description ==
Coping Cookies was a LGBTQ- and woman-owned bakery and dessert shop on 12th Avenue on Seattle's Capitol Hill. The business donated a portion of earnings to mission-aligned non-profit organizations, especially those related to mental health. According to Capitol Hill Seattle Blog, Coping Cookies selected possible groups to support by "examining their finances, assessing the board of directors, and investigating how the organizations interact on social media accounts". The business also educated people about mental health on social media.

Coping Cookies specialized in large cookies with "delightful, punny, mental health-themed" names, according to KING-TV. Among chilled cookie varieties were chocolate chip, the Cocolemon (coconut, lemon, and white chocolate), the Key Lime Climb, and the Safe and Sconed. Some cookies were stuffed with ingredients like caramel, mashmallow, and Oreo. The Rocky Riot was stuffed with marshmallow creme and had almonds. Seasonal varieties included Earl Grey and lemon poppy seed, as well as lemon-boysenberry.

== History ==
Coping Cookies was co-owned by partners Ashley Hernandez and Sam Padilla. The business launched in July 2020, during the COVID-19 pandemic, as a bake sale for Hernandez’s colleagues at Seattle Children's. Her co-workers "purchased" cookies by donating to various non-profit organizations. The sale encouraged the couple to host more events, will became a series of pop-ups. According to The Seattle Times, Coping Cookies "started out of a desire to connect with their community during an isolating time". Fed Up Collective, Stonewall Youth, and the WA Therapy Fund are among organizations Coping Cookies has supported.

Hernandez and Padilla upgraded to a commissary kitchen, then opened a storefront in March 2023. It closed permanently on March 17, 2024. On social media, the owners attributed the closure to a delayed opening and costly equipment repairs. The business continued to operate via online ordering. Coping Cookies' model has inspired other businesses, including Grayseas Pies, to donate a portion of earnings to non-profit groups.

== See also ==
- LGBTQ culture in Seattle
- List of bakeries
