= Everybody.World =

American apparel brand

Everybody.World is an American clothing and lifestyle goods company that designs and sells sustainable apparel. The brand was founded in 2016 in Los Angeles, California by former American Apparel employees Iris Alonzo and Carolina Crespo. The brand received popularity after releasing a T-shirt made from post-industrial cotton waste.

== History ==
Iris Alonzo and Carolina Crespo founded Everybody.World in 2016 after leaving American Apparel, where they had worked for a combined 25 years. The brand received coverage after they developed a T-shirt made from 100% recycled cotton and named it the Trash Tee.

By 2020, Everybody.World expanded its product line to include recycled fleece clothing and woven accessories, all made in the Americas. Contributing designers include Jean Pigozzi. Angela Dimayuga, Ron Finley, and others.

The company's products are sold exclusively online. Artists including Lorde and André 3000 have used the brand's blank T-shirts to make more sustainable merch.
