= Koko's (restaurant) =

Restaurant chain in the U.S. state of Washington

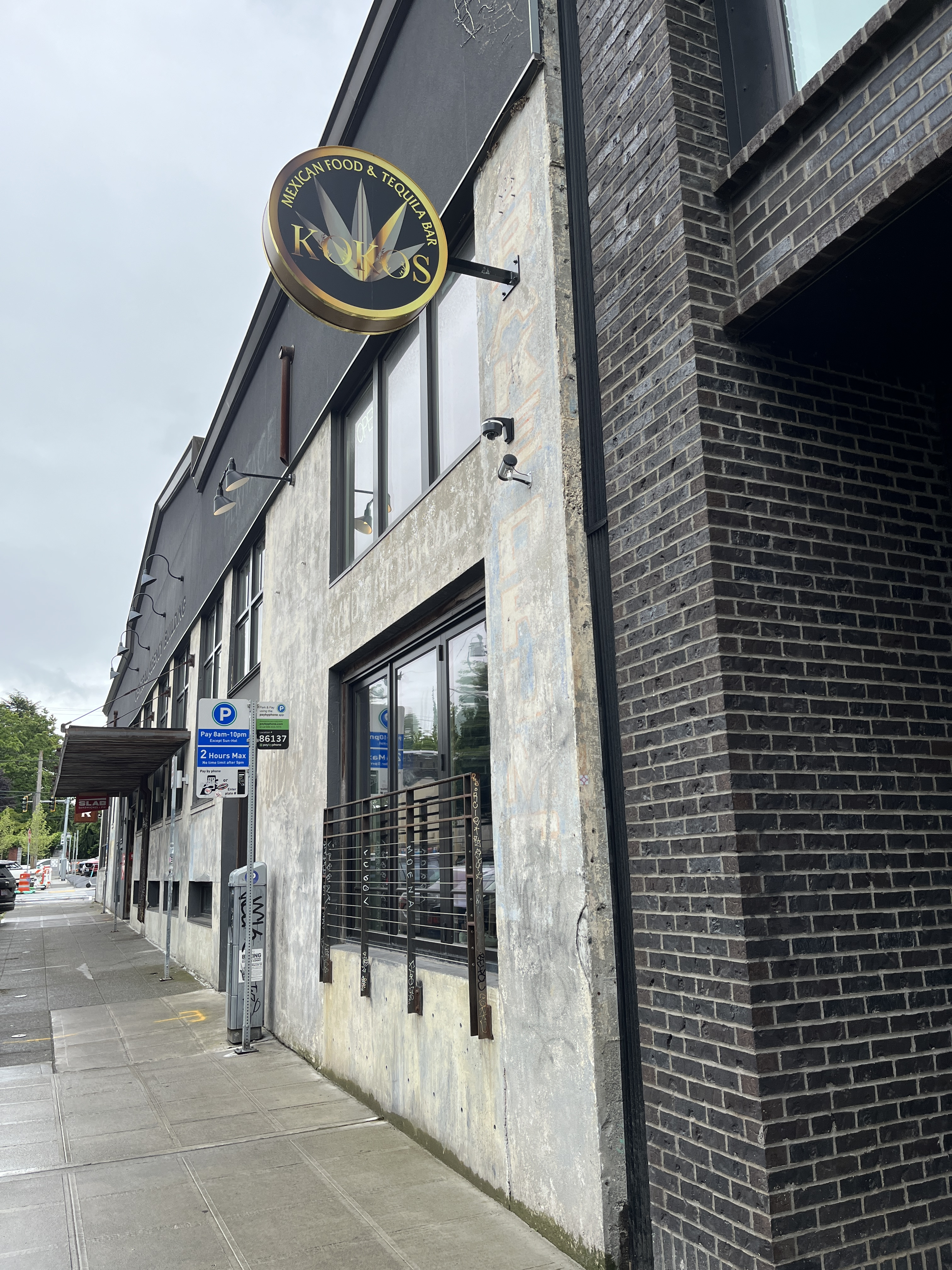
- Exterior of the restaurant in Seattle in 2024
- Interactive map of Koko's

Restaurant information
- Food type: Latin American; Mexican; Salvadoran
- Location: Washington, United States
- Coordinates: 47.0450°N 122.8983°W
- Website: kokos-restaurant.com

Koko's Restaurant & Tequila Bar, or simply Koko's, is a small chain of restaurants in the U.S. state of Washington. The business has operated in the Pacific City / Seabrook area, as well as Olympia and Seattle. Koko's serves Latin American, Mexican, and Salvadoran cuisine such as burritos, enchiladas, fried plantains, guacamole, tacos, and tortilla soup, and has garnered a positive reception.

== Description ==
Koko's is a small chain of restaurants in the U.S. state of Washington: the original restaurant, which has also been described as a tequila bar, operates in the Pacific City / Seabrook area, and the business has also operated in Olympia and Seattle. According to Fodor's, the original restaurant has high ceilings and reclaimed wood. Koko's is LGBTQ-owned.

=== Menu ===
Koko's serves modern Latin American, Mexican, and Salvadoran cuisine. The menu includes burritos and tostadas, steak tacos, poblano-cashew enchiladas, fried plantains, and cocktails, including mojitos as well as spicy and strawberry margaritas. The restaurant has also served a "Mexican poke bowl" with yellowfin tuna, mango, and edamame, as well as carne asada and chicken flautas, tortilla soup, guacamole, and a cucumber-cilantro margarita. The Morati is a martini with mezcal, muddled blueberries, lime juice, and organic agave nectar. Mexican hot chocolate is among drink options on the brunch menu.

== History ==
Koko's is owned by partners Gibran Moreno Ventura and Alexi Torres. Moreno and Torres opened Koko's Lounge on Fourth Avenue East in Olympia in 2020, serving Mexican and Salvadoran cuisine.

During the COVID-19 pandemic, Koko's pledged to donate thousands of burritos to support food programs in the area, in collaboration with the Seabrook Community Foundation.

== Reception ==
In Moon Olympic Peninsula, Jeff Burlingame said the coast location "offers great food in a fun setting" and called the menu "both fresh and a little different". Koko's was included in Seattle Metropolitan's 2023 list of Washington's best restaurants. In a similar 2024 list, the magazine's Allison Williams and Allecia Vermillion said Koko's has the "ability to wield American influence (kale salad, a chorizo burger) without dumbing things down". In 2024, Tim Davis of WestSound Magazine said Koko's was among three "proper" sit-down eateries in Seabrook, writing: "The restaurant with a buzz was Koko's. Both friends who had stayed here and locals we spoke with sang praises to this modern Latin restaurant, and Koko’s didn't disappoint. While the other restaurants were decidedly quiet on our midweek September visit, Koko's was full up and lively, with many waiting for a table."

== See also ==
- List of Mexican restaurants
