= Angela Dimayuga =

American chef (born 1985)

- Born: 1985 (age 40–41); San Jose, California, U.S.
- Employer: Standard Hotels International
- Culinary career
- Cooking style: Modern fusion

Angela Solita Dimayuga (born 1985), also known as Angel Dimayuga, is an American chef and political activist. She was an executive chef at Mission Chinese Food New York, and helped to build the restaurant in its early years. Dimayuga was included in the Zagat's "30 Under 30" List in 2015 as an upcoming culinary star and was also part of 2015 class of Eater Young Guns. She was nominated for a James Beard Foundation Award in 2016 and named a 2017 Rising Star Chef for her work at Mission Chinese Food New York. She worked with The Standard Hotel, which opened in London in 2019.

== Biography ==
Angela Dimayuga was born and raised in San Jose, California into a Filipino-American family. She is one of six siblings. Her father and mother were born in Batangas and Pampanga, Philippines, respectively. Her parents met when her mother was touring with the Filipino national folk dance troupe. Dimayuga's pronouns are she/they.

Dimayuga studied hotel and restaurant management at California Polytechnic State University (Cal Poly), and humanities at University of Strathclyde and San Francisco State University (SFSU).

She joined the NYC culinary scene in 2007, when she moved to Bedford-Stuyvesant, Brooklyn. At age 22, she started as a line cook at "'Vinegar Hill House" in Brooklyn. She credit's Vinegar Hill House's Jean Adamson as a mentor who helped launch her career.

She is a multi-disciplinary food industry creative, who worked as Mission Chinese Food's executive chef in New York. She is also a contributor to Bon Appétit magazine, a food stylist, media personality, and interested in the intersection of politics in her work.

In April 2018, Dimayuga was hired as creative director of food and culture for the Standard International hotel group.

In light of the Gaza war, Dimayuga signed an open letter addressed to Joe Biden, President of the United States, calling for a ceasefire.

== Mission Chinese Food ==
In 2012 she was cold-called by Danny Bowien to help open the first New York City iteration of his San Francisco restaurant, Mission Chinese Food. Dimayuga helped design the menu and interiors for Bowien's subsequent three Manhattan restaurants: Mission Chinese Food on Orchard St, Mission Cantina, and the new Mission Chinese Food (after the closure of the Orchard Street location) on East Broadway.

Dipping into her Filipino roots, Dimayuga's menu at Mission Chinese Food was what she called "New American"; a cuisine not simply about Asian fusion or even Asian-American, but rather, reflective of the kind of hybrid dining. At MCF, Dimayuga was not only the executive chef, but helped to contextualize the restaurant within the culture of the surrounding Lower East Side and Chinatown neighborhoods, through various artist collaborations. Dimayuga commissioned a network of creatives to design work for the restaurant and its external pop-ups and collaborations. In addition, she selected musicians to play in the restaurant, as well as worked with friends and fellow artists to design a signature streetwear line for the restaurant.

In late October 2017, she resigned from Mission Chinese Food claiming "[her] sphere of ambition is just different and bigger."

== Notable collaborations and events ==
Dimayuga has worked with and created collaborations and pop-ups for La Buvette, restaurant Noma, Le Chateaubriand, Frankie's Prime Meats, Dimes, Lyle's, Pok Pok, Sqirl, Night + Market, Saison, Lil' Deb's Oasis, Attica, Husk, among others.

- In 2016, Dimayuga appeared on the television show Eat the World with Emeril Lagasse, as herself.
- Working with MCF's beverage director, Sam Anderson, she designed the sets for the beverage experience for Red Bull Music Academy New York's 2017 festival. Events included Fluxo: Funk Proibidão, Trade Show USA, and Sacred Bones 10 Year Anniversary.
- Working with Opening Ceremony over a number of collaborations over the years, designing "The Dip Jean," with Alex Aiku, and a dinner for Creative Time's annual benefit dinner in 2017.
- Collaborating on an insect and food-related editorial shoot with artist Anicka Yi (2016 Hugo Boss Prize Winner) for the September issue "A Magazine Curated By" Eckhaus Latta
- Working with Felix Burrichter and Michael Bullock (Editors of PIN-UP magazine), for a Design Week 2017 pop-up called "Rear View".
- In 2017, she declined to be interviewed for Ivanka Trump's website, citing her desire to be distanced from the Trump family.
- In 2017, the Massachusetts Institute of Technology (MIT) Media Lab and Dimayuga are working together on a creating fermentation boxes and related health protocols for restaurants.
- Dimayuga paired up in cooking with Dominique Crenn at the 2017 Harlem EatUp!, an annual food festival in Harlem, New York.
- She has done event work for City Harvest, Tasting Table, Food Book Fair and many more.
- She has appeared the podcast on the Heritage Radio Network, Radio Cherry Bombe: Episode 87: New York's Next Wave.

== Awards ==
Under her watch, MCF was awarded 2 stars and "Restaurant of the Year" in 2012 by The New York Times. In 2015, she was named "Best Chef" by New York. The James Beard Foundation named her a "rising star chef" in 2016. In 2017, StarChefs publication named her one of their rising stars.

In 2016, she was the keynote speaker at Restaurant noma's global, "MAD Food Symposium". Her speech, "Burning the Candle at Both Ends," focused on the maintenance of work and life balance as a chef.

== Publications ==
- Dimayuga, Angela; Mishan, Ligaya (November 2, 2021). Filipinx: Heritage Recipes from the Diaspora. Alex Lau (Photographs). Abrams. ISBN 9781419750380.

== See also ==
- Filipinos in the New York metropolitan area
- LGBT culture in New York City
- List of LGBT people from New York City
- New Yorkers in journalism
