= Union Seattle =

Gay bar in Seattle, Washington, U.S.

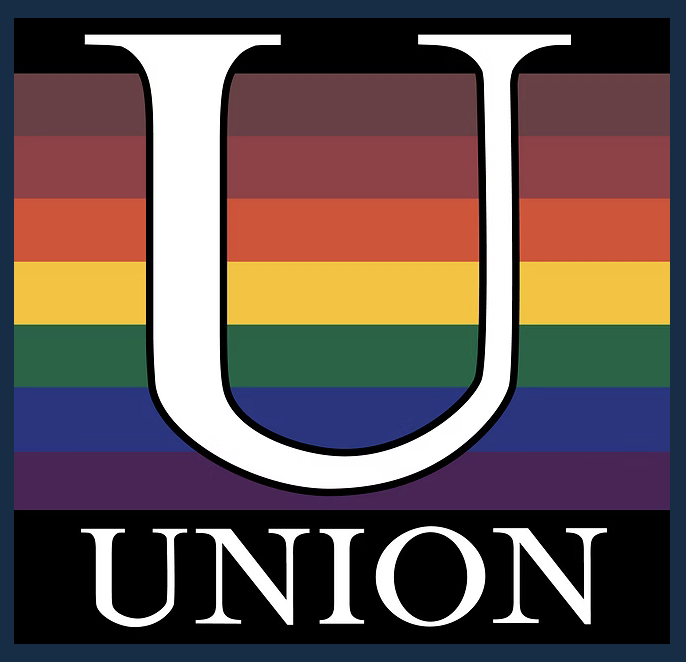
- Logo

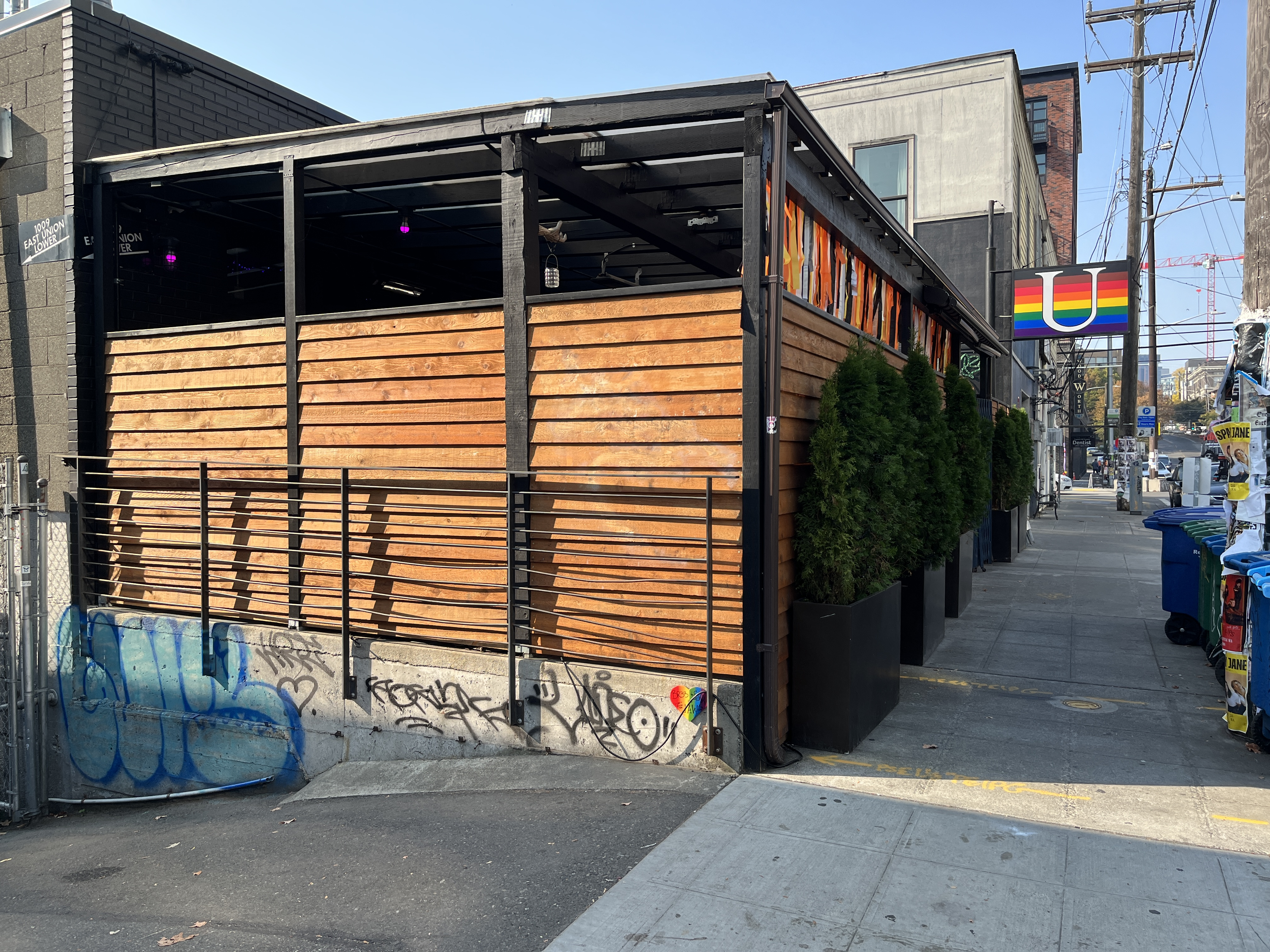
- Exterior, 2022
- Interactive map of Union Seattle
- Address: 1009 E Union Street, Ste. C
- Location: Seattle, Washington, U.S.
- Coordinates: 47.61271°N 122.31892°W

Website
- unionseattle.com

Union Seattle, or simply Union, is a gay bar and cocktail lounge in Seattle's Capitol Hill neighborhood, on Union Street between 10th and 11th Ave, in the U.S. state of Washington.

== Description and history ==
Union Seattle is located on East Union Street, between 10th and 11th Avenues. The LGBT-owned bar was opened by Nathan Benedict, Mark Engelmann, and Steve Nyman in 2018, in a space formerly occupied by Zoe at the intersection of 14th and Union.

Union's menu has included pizzas, burgers, salads, and sandwiches, as well as beer, spirits, and wine.

The building housing Union caught fire in 2019 and relocated in 2020, during the COVID-19 pandemic, and reopened on March 12, 2021.

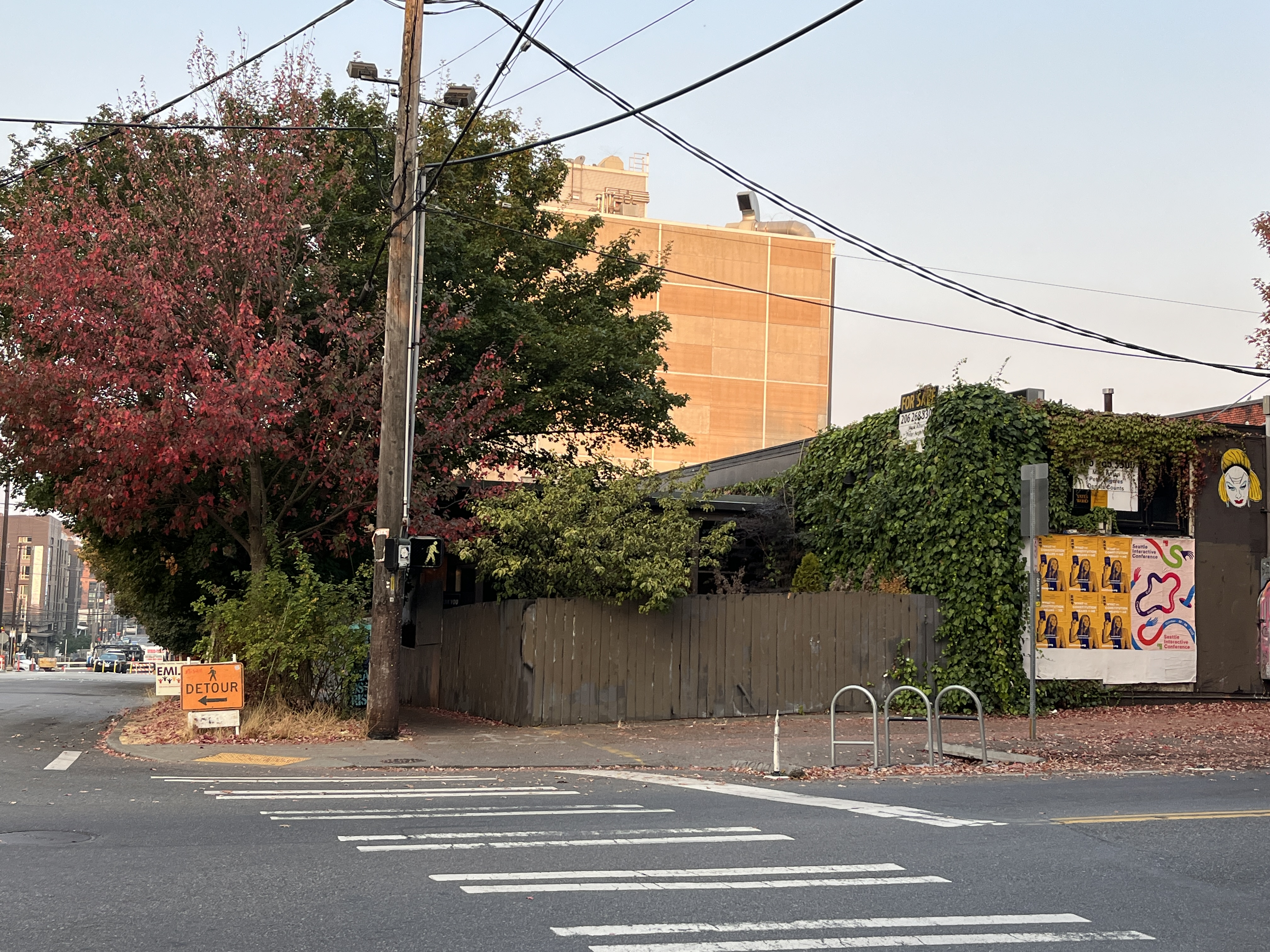
Former location

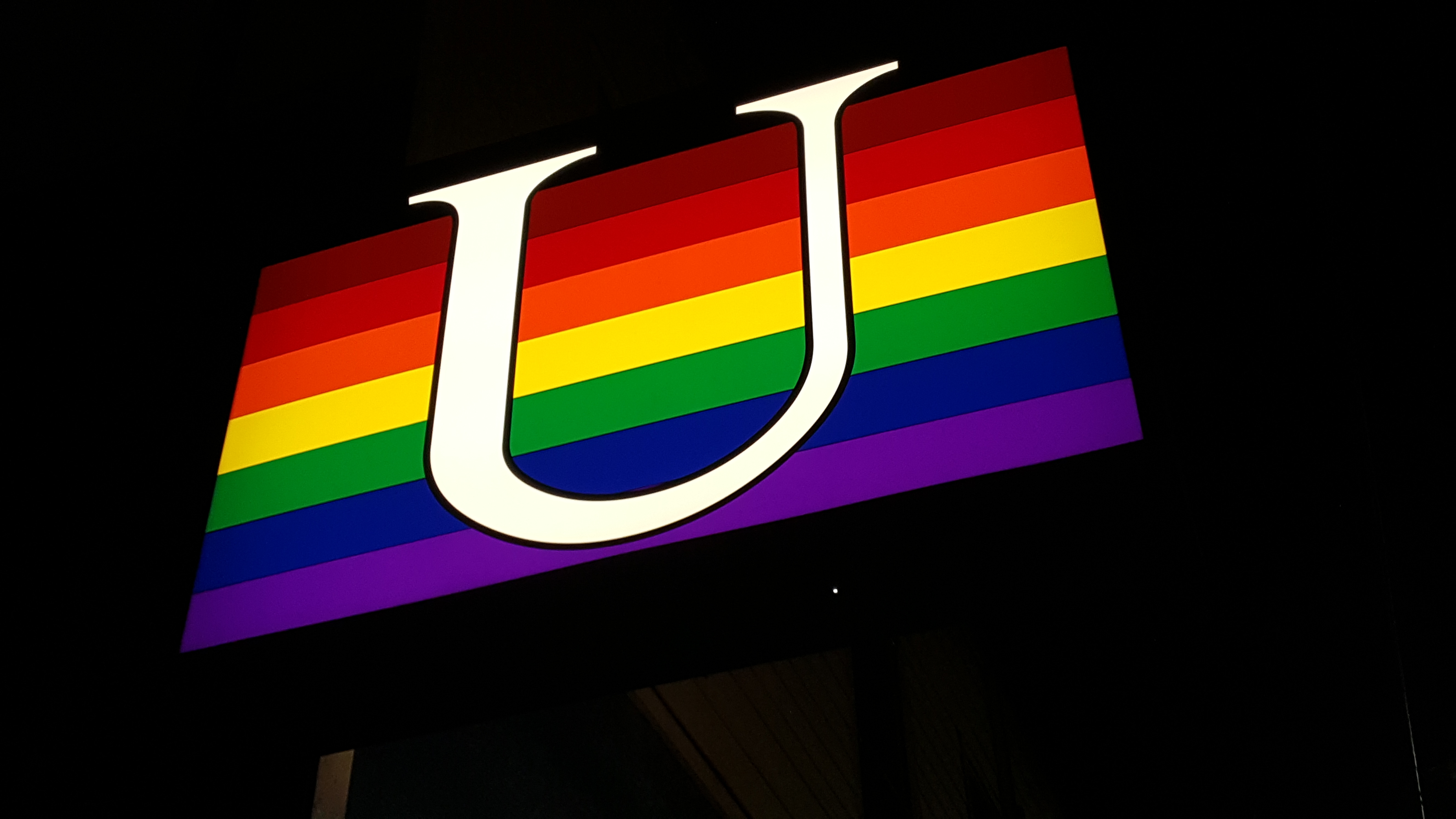
Exterior sign, 2022

== See also ==
- List of LGBTQ bars
