= Big Little News =

Newsstand in Seattle, Washington, U.S.

Coordinates: 47°36′51″N 122°19′04″W

- Logo

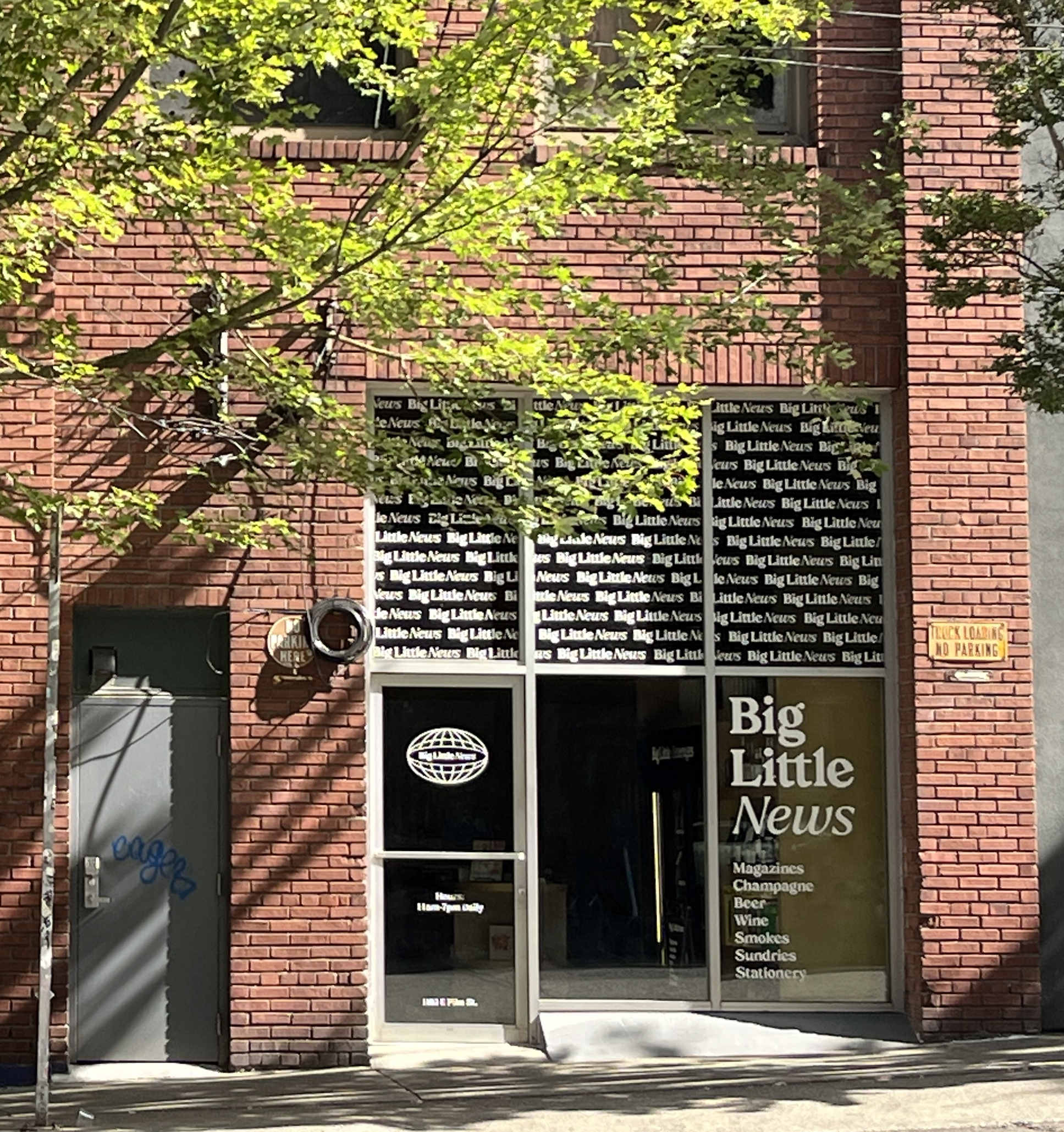
- The shop's exterior in 2023
- Founded: March 2021; 5 years ago
- Headquarters: 1102 East Pike Street, Seattle, Washington, United States
- Website: biglittlenews.com

Big Little News was a shop in Seattle, in the U.S. state of Washington. Co-owners Joey Burgess and Tracy Taylor opened the bodega-style newsstand on Pike Street on Capitol Hill in March 2021. Big Little News carried domestic and foreign newspapers and other publications such as fashion magazines, tabloids, and zines, as well as books, gifts, drinks, and snacks.

== Description ==
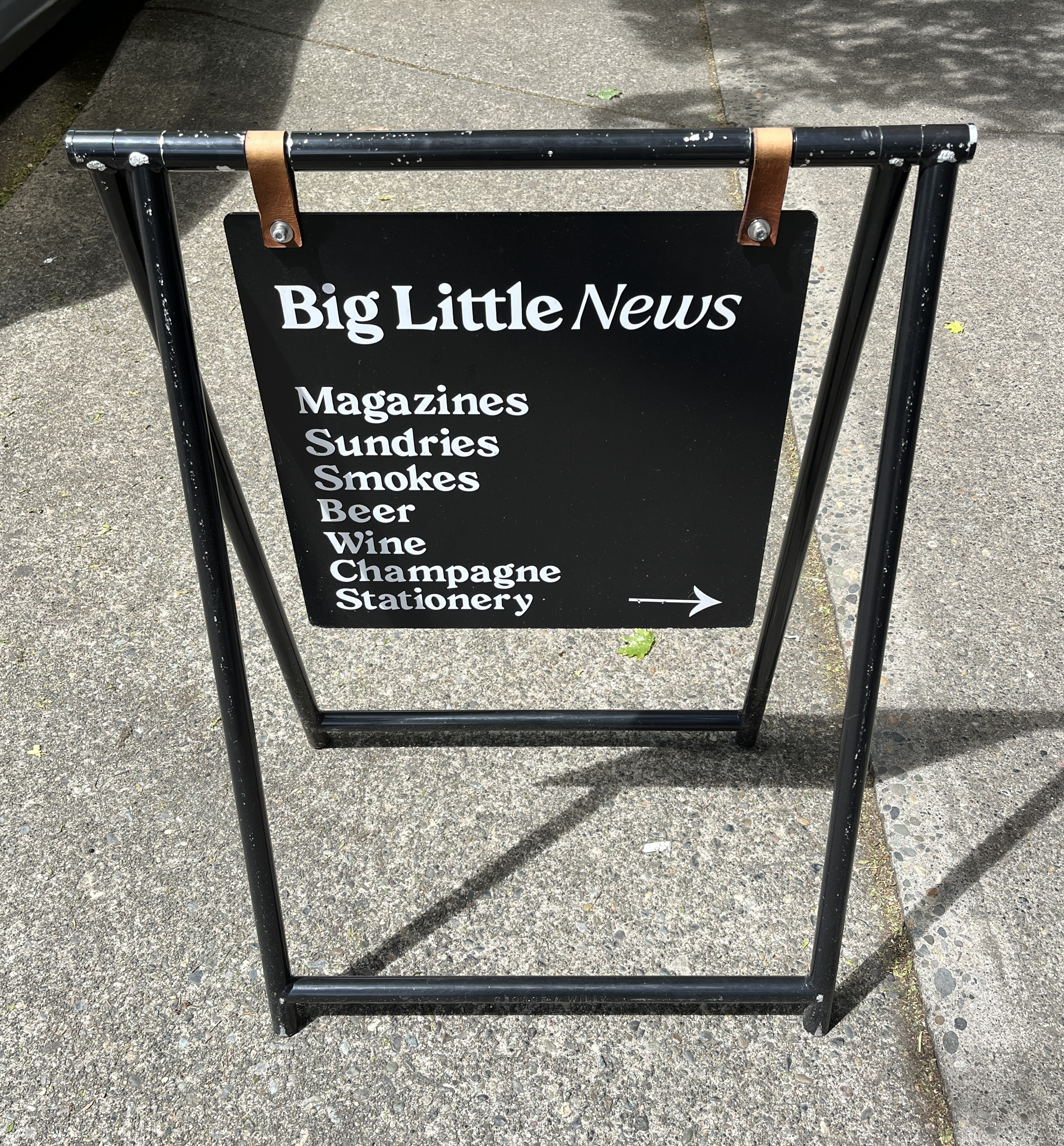
Sign for the shop, 2024

The shop Big Little News operated on Pike Street, near the intersection of 11th Avenue, on Seattle's Capitol Hill. The bodega-style newsstand carried approximately 200–250 domestic and international magazines, newspapers, and other publications. Fodor's described the business as a "tiny but huge-hearted new-era newsstand" with fashion magazines, "carefully crafted" journals, tabloids, and "low-budget" zines.

The shop also stocked books, gifts, puzzles, snacks, sodas, beer, champagne, and wine. According to the Seattle Post-Intelligencer, Big Little News offered "bi-monthly subscription boxes that can be shipped nationwide filled with exclusive magazine titles, specialty snacks, stationary and other curated goodies". The shop was described as a woman- and LGBTQ-owned business.

== History ==
The shop opened in early March 2021, in a remodeled space that previously housed an elevator shaft and later the vintage store No Parking. Business partners Joey Burgess and Tracy Taylor were co-owners. Big Little News was described as the city's first bodega-inspired newsstand, and was the neighborhood's first newsstand in a decade, according to KING-TV.

In 2021, the shop offered Easter baskets with candy bars, a chocolate bunny, select magazines, and wine. For Mother's Day, Big Little News had gift boxes with a potted pansy, a bottle of Rose, a journal with a pencil set, and select magazines. The shop hosted a LGBT pride-themed pop-up in June, in conjunction with Pride Month.
