= Shikorina =

Bakery in Seattle, Washington, U.S.

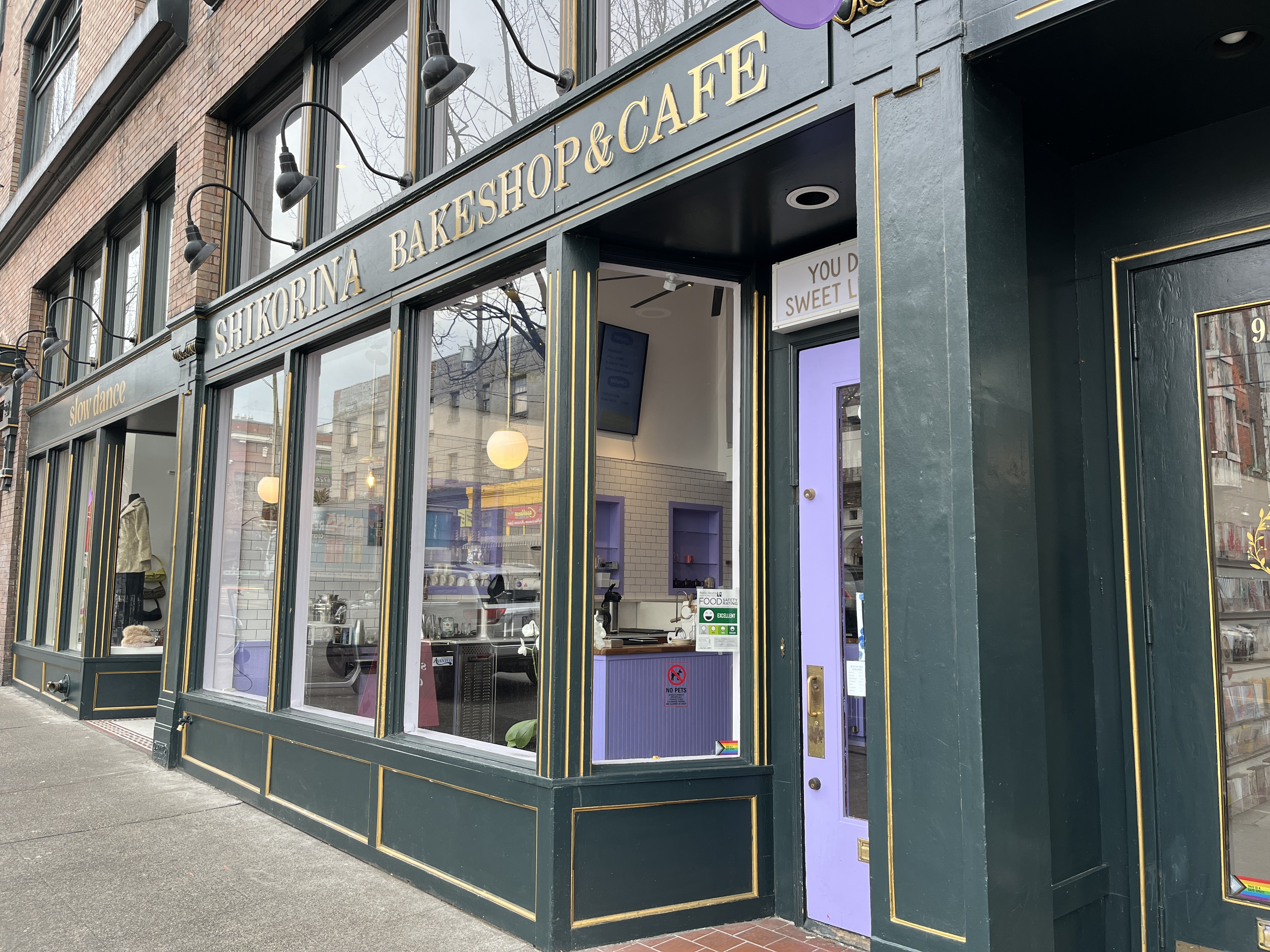
- The bakery's exterior on East Pike Street, 2024
- Interactive map of Shikorina

Restaurant information
- Established: 2021
- Owner: Hana Yohannes
- Location: 907 East Pike Street, Seattle, King, Washington, 98122, United States
- Coordinates: 47.6140°N 122.3203°W
- Website: shikorinaseattle.com

Shikorina Bakeshop and Cafe (originally known as Shikorina Pastries, or simply Shikorina) was a bakery in Seattle, in the U.S. state of Washington. Owner Hana Yohannes opened the shop in the Central District in 2021, and renamed the business after relocating to Capitol Hill.

Shikorina offered various baked goods such as breads, brownies, cakes, cookies, cupcakes, pies, and Pop-Tart-style handpies. The Black- and LGBT-owned bakery garnered a positive reception. It closed permanently in 2026.

== Description ==
Shikorina—which means "sweetheart" or "sweetness" in Tigrinya—was a bakery on East Pike Street, on Seattle's Capitol Hill. Previously, the business operated in a purple house on East Union in the Central District. It was described as inclusive and sustainable. According to The Seattle Times, Shikkorina used "locally sourced, organic and fair trade ingredients". The shop on Capitol Hill had high ceilings and lavender accents. It was described as Black- and LGBTQ-owned.

Shikorina sold banana bread, brownies, cakes, cookies (including chocolate chip), cupcakes, pies, and other baked goods. Cake varieties included browned butter vanilla, red velvet with cream cheese filling, and vegan chocolate. Pie varieties included apple, berry, and pumpkin, and varieties of Pop-Tart-style handpies included blueberry matcha, salted caramel apple, and strawberry. Drinks included coffee and lemonade.

== History ==
The bakery was owned by Hana Yohannes, who participated in The Pastry Project and raised funds to open the original shop via the crowdfunding platform GoFundMe. The business opened as Shikorina Pastries in the Central District in 2021, during the COVID-19 pandemic. Following the relocation to Capitol Hill, the business was renamed to Shikorina Bakeshop and Cafe. It operated in the space that previously housed Ben & Esther's Vegan Jewish Deli. In January 2026, Yohannes said the Capitol Hill location did not work out. The bakery closed permanently in 2026.

== Reception ==
Kurt Suchman included Shikorina in Eater Seattle's 2023 overview of recommended restaurants for "delectable" pies and 2025 overview of the city's best cookies.

== See also ==
- List of bakeries
- List of Black-owned restaurants
- List of defunct restaurants of the United States
