= Poquitos =

Restaurant in Seattle, Washington, U.S.

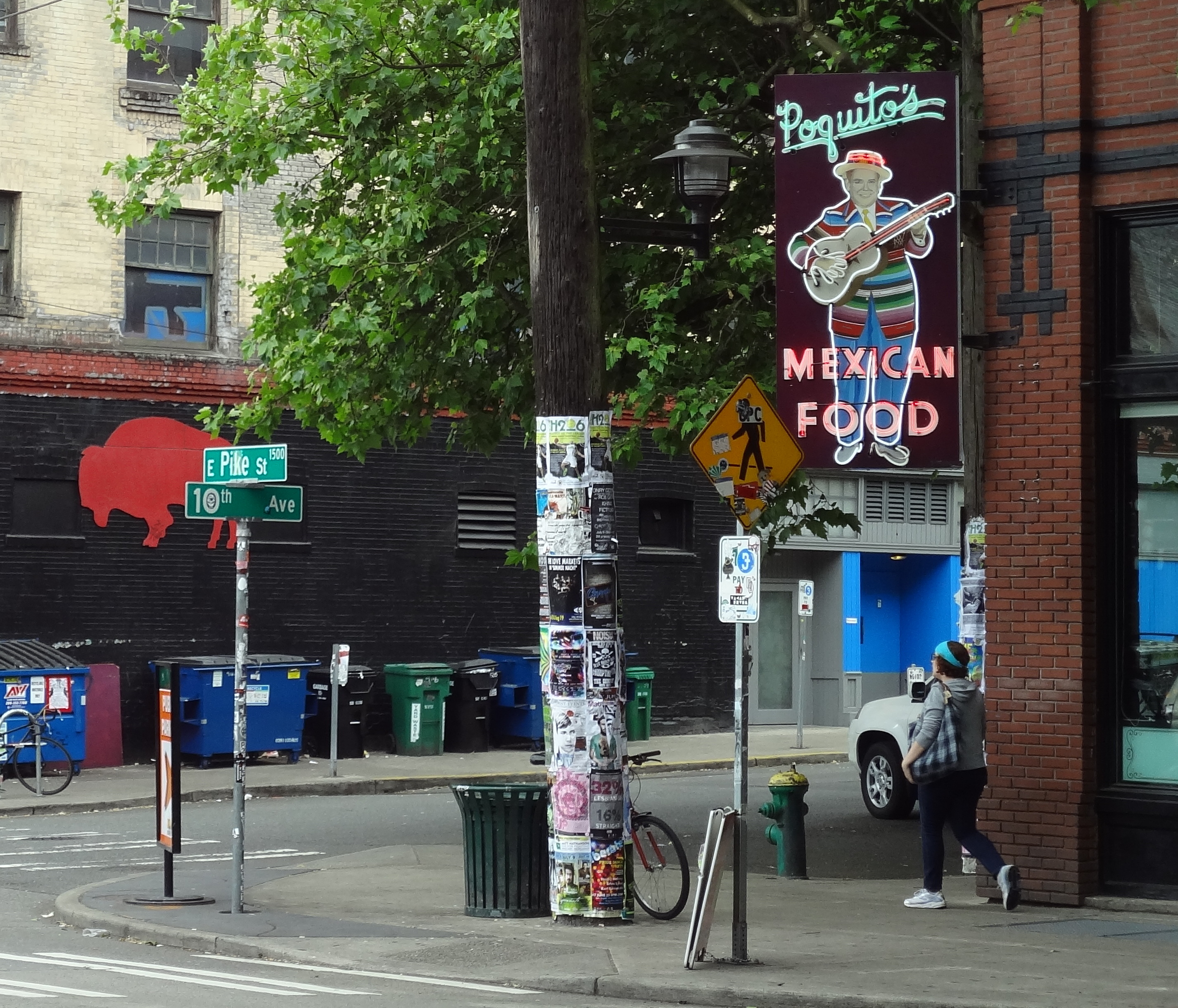
- Restaurant signage, 2011
- Interactive map of Poquitos

Restaurant information
- Location: 1000 E Pike Street, Seattle, Washington, 98122, United States
- Coordinates: 47.61424°N 122.31914°W
- Website: vivapoquitos.com

Poquitos is a Mexican restaurant in with three locations in the U.S. state of Washington. The original restaurant is located in Seattle's Capitol Hill neighborhood, at the intersection of 10th and Pike. Locations have subsequently opened in Bothell (2018) and Tacoma (2022). The Bothell location permanently closed in September 2025.

== Description ==
In 2016 and 2017, the Not for Tourists Guide to Seattle described the restaurant as "accessible, authentic Mexican using high-quality ingredients".

== History ==
The LGBTQ-owned restaurant was opened by restaurateurs Deming Maclise and James Weimann in 2011, and its operating owners were Matt Fundingsland and Dustin Watson, as of 2014.

In 2017, owners announced plans to open a second location in Bothell. The restaurant opened in 2018.

A third location opened in Tacoma in 2022.

== Reception ==
Allecia Vermillion included the restaurant in Seattle Metropolitan's 2021 list of "The Best Restaurants on Capitol Hill".

== See also ==
- List of Mexican restaurants
- List of restaurant chains in the United States
