= Cone & Steiner =

Grocery store in Seattle, Washington, U.S.

- Logo

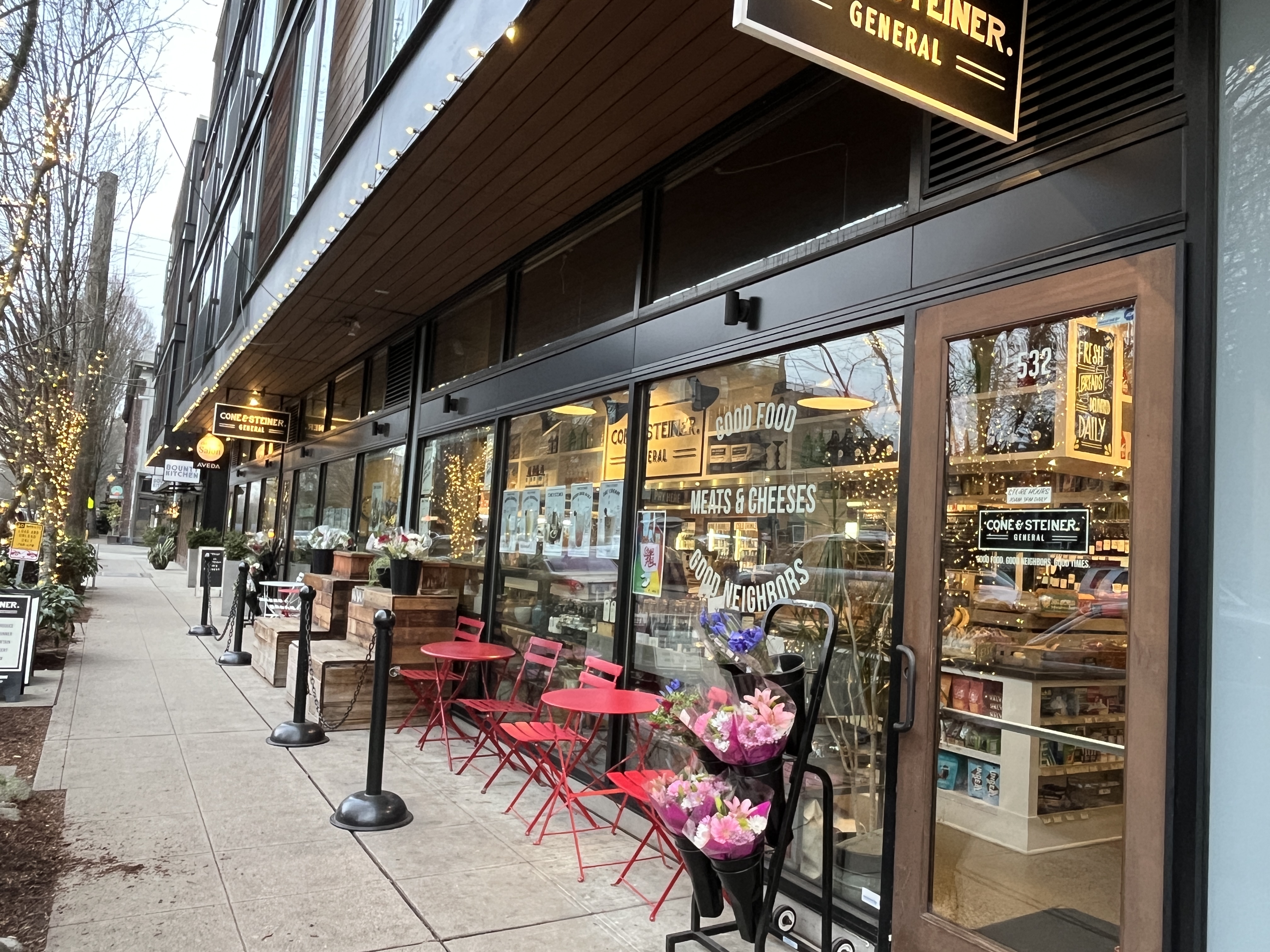
- Exterior of the Capitol Hill store, 2023
- Company type: Private
- Industry: Grocery
- Predecessor: Cone & Steiner Meats & Groceries
- Founded: 2014; 11 years ago in Seattle, United States
- Founders: Dani Cone, Josh Henderson
- Headquarters: Seattle, United States
- Website: coneandsteiner.com

Cone & Steiner is a grocery store with multiple locations in Seattle, in the U.S. state of Washington. In 2014, co-owners Dani Cone and Josh Henderson opened a first store on Capitol Hill and a second in Pioneer Square. A third location opened in downtown Seattle in 2017 but is no longer operating.

== Description ==
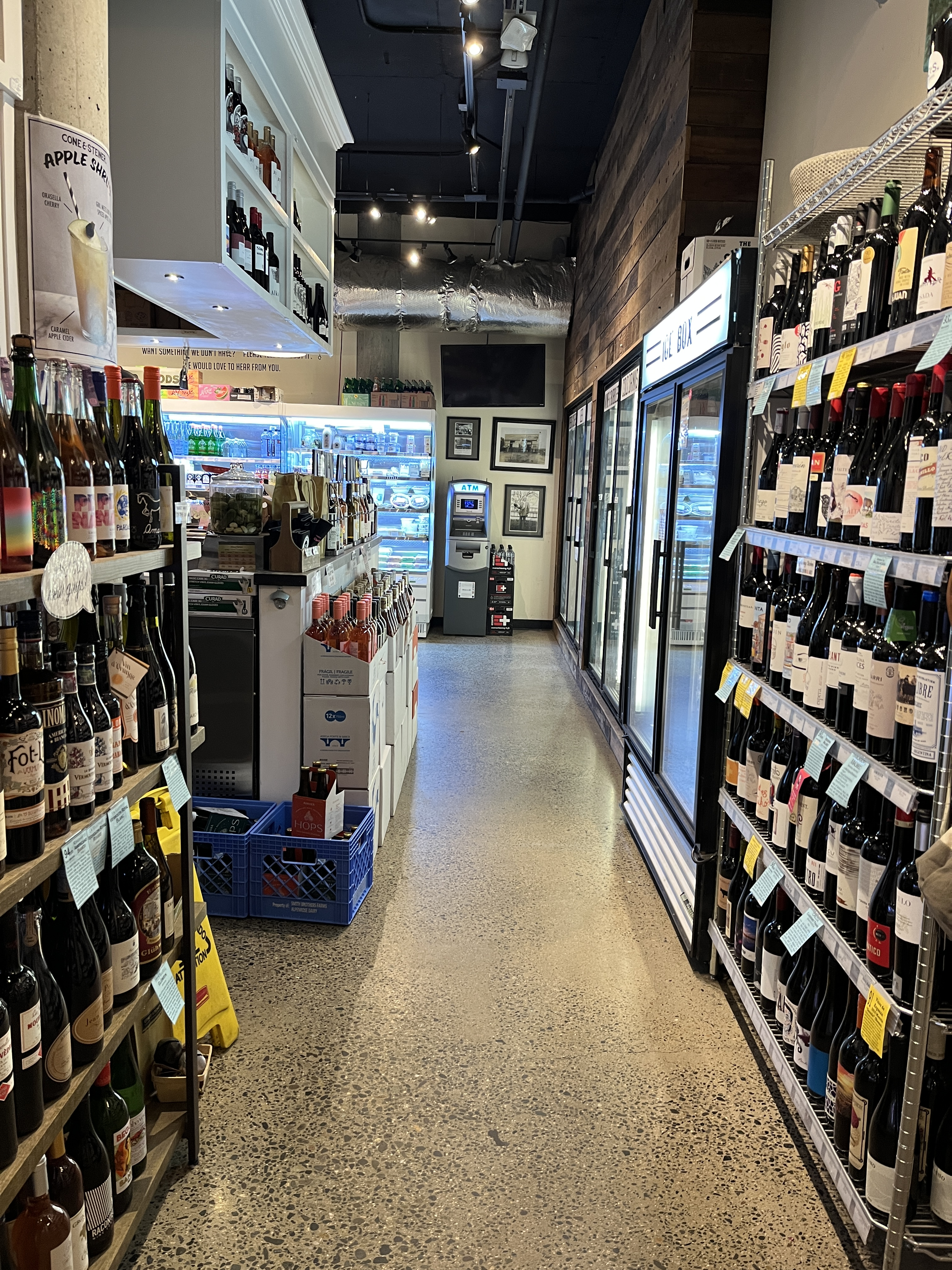
Interior of the Capitol Hill store in 2023

Thrillist has described Cone & Steiner as "a speciality grocery ... jam-packed with local goodies galore, as well as a beer bar and pretty much anything else you could possibly need from a proper corner store". Products include coffee, flowers, housewares, pantry items, salads, and sandwiches. The LGBTQ-owned business has billed itself as "the corner store for the millennial generation".

In Food Lovers' Guide to Seattle, food writer Laurie Wolf said of the Capitol Hill location: "This market has an old-fashioned feel and carries well-sourced products, including everything you need to throw a grand dinner party or prepare a perfectly delightful picnic basket. There is a great craft beer selection with a rotating six-tap growler station. They often have tastings and are extremely helpful with any of your food-related shopping needs." Sunset magazine said of the Capitol Hill store: "The market is a haven for hands-on shoppers: There's a grind-your-own-flour station, five taps for filling growlers, and the basic provisions neighborhood folks need to fix everything from dinner to doorknobs."

== History ==
Co-owner and chief executive officer Dani Cone established Cone & Steiner in 2014, re-launching the Cone & Steiner Meats & Groceries store started by her great-grandfather in SoDo in 1915. Josh Henderson is also a partner.

The first location opened on 19th Avenue on Capitol Hill. The second location opened in Pioneer Square, in the Stadium Place development at the intersection of Occidental and King, in August 2014. Upon opening, Bethany Jean Clement of The Stranger said the Pioneer Square store was "expensive, but sure to do well in this grocery desert". The business manages an in-house delivery service.

A third location opened in downtown in 2017 but has since closed.
