= Temple Pastries =

Bakery in Seattle, Washington, U.S.

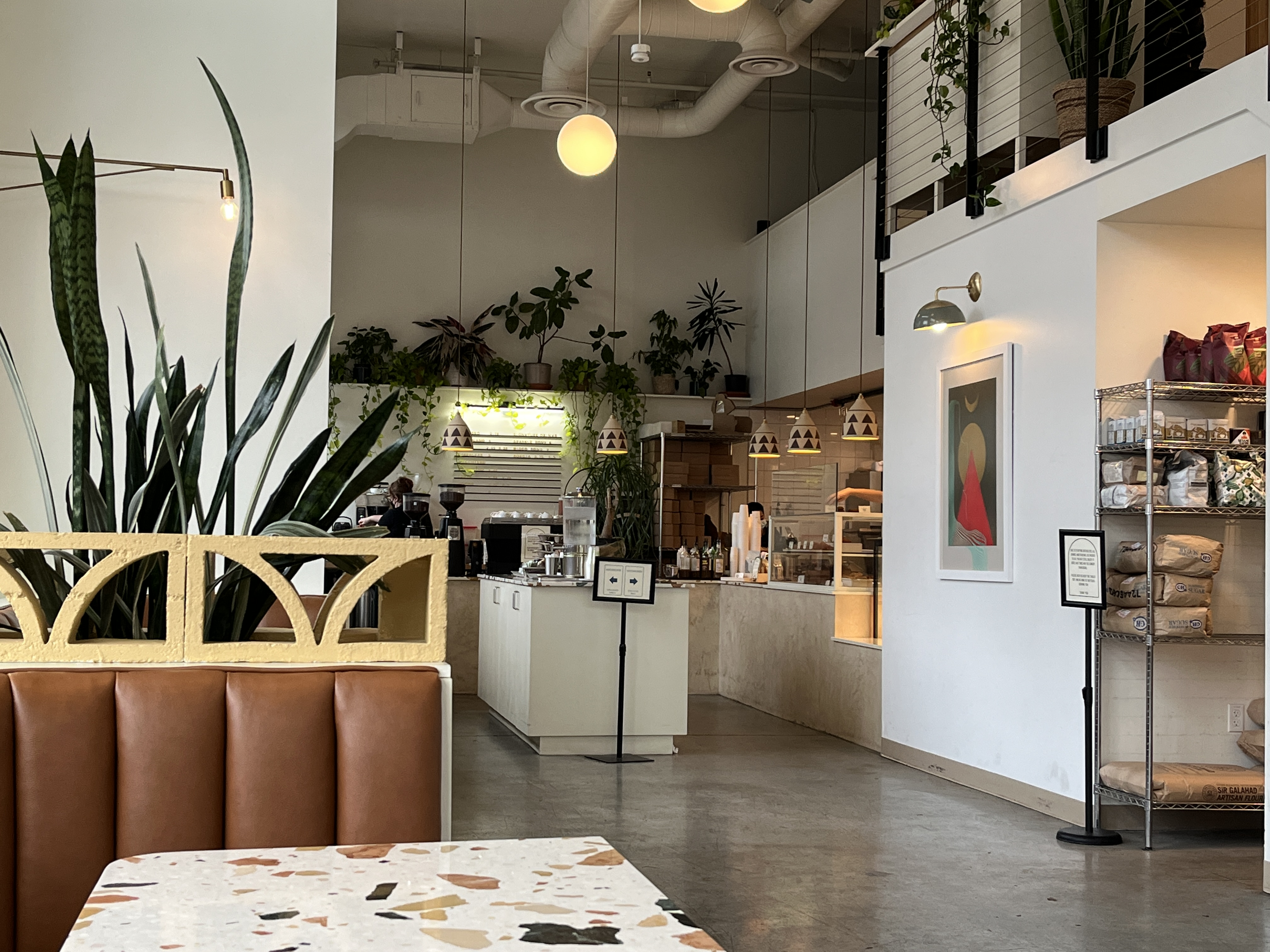
- The shop's interior, 2022
- Interactive map of Temple Pastries

Restaurant information
- Established: 2018
- Location: Seattle, King, Washington, United States
- Coordinates: 47.5994°N 122.2989°W
- Website: templepastries.com

Temple Pastries is a bakery in Seattle's Central District, in the U.S. state of Washington. Christina Wood started the business as a pop-up in 2018, and relocated to a brick-and-mortar restaurant in partnership with Broadcast Coffee Roasters in 2020.

== Description ==
Temple Pastries is a queer-owned bakery at the intersection of 26th and Jackson in Seattle's Central District, specializing in sourdough croissants and cruffins (croissant/muffin hybrids). Seasonal varieties of croissants have included salted caramel apple, chocolate hazelnut with orange zest sugar, and plum and cardamom. The bakery has also sold cakes, breads, cookies, croissant pretzels, breakfast sandwiches, macarons, sweet potato jam doughnuts, and coffee and espresso drinks. Breakfast sandwiches have bacon, cheddar cheese, and chives, or poblano, Swiss cheese, and mushroom, baked into eggs and served on a wheat bun. Among the macron varieties is Autumn Leaves, which has a white chocolate ganache infused with bay leaves, cinnamon, and peppercorns. Temple Pastries bakes using buckwheat, rye, and whole grain.

== History ==
Christina Wood started the business in July 2018, as a pop-up at farmers' markets and coffee shops. It is her first bakery. In 2019, Christina and Barry Faught, owner of Broadcast Coffee Roasters partnered to open a brick & mortar bakery in 2020. Initially slated to open in September, Temple Pastries opened on October 23. In 2023, the bakery began producing select baked goods at the Broadcast Coffee on 65th Avenue Northeast and Roosevelt. The Central District location also expanded and announced plans to start offering pizza.

== Reception ==
Callie Craighead included the bakery in the Seattle Post-Intelligencer's 2021 list of the city's nine best doughnut shops. Megan Hill and Jade Yamazaki Stewart included Temple Pastries in Eater Seattle's 2022 overview of fifteen "great places" to eat in the Central District. The website's Harry Cheadle included the business in 2023 lists of Seattle's sixteen "most perfect" bakeries and best cafes for remote work. Stewart and Cheadle also included Temple Pastries in a 2024 list of thirteen Seattle eateries for "amazing" breakfast. Aimee Rizzo included the business in The Infatuation's 2024 overview of the city's best bakeries. Seattle Magazine and The Stranger have also included Temple Pastries in overviews of the city's best croissants.

== See also ==
- List of bakeries
