= LGBTQ-owned business =

Business enterprise owned by one or more members of the LGBTQ community

LGBTQ-, or queer-owned businesses are businesses owned and often operated by members of the LGBTQIA+ community. They may also be described as being owned by specific subgroups, such as gay-, lesbian-, or trans-owned businesses.

Many queer-owned businesses cater specifically to marginalized people by offering products that are not otherwise widely available. They are commonly more likely to have difficulty acquiring financial backing.

Some government institutions and municipalities have special programs to support minority-owned businesses and have started to include LGBTQ-owned businesses in such programs.

The term queer business is used occasionally. In 2022, Charlie Sprinkman created the website Everywhere Is Queer to help promote queer-owned businesses around the world.

== Canada ==
Cape & Cowl is among LGBTQ-owned businesses in Canada.

== Mexico ==
Paco Ruiz opened Club Paco Paco (later known as Paco's Ranch) in Puerto Vallarta, Jalisco, in December 1989. According to Ed Walsh of SFGate, "At the time, Jalisco didn't have formal laws against homosexuality. But police and regulators often targeted gay-owned businesses for shakedowns because, without political connections or meaningful support in the broader local community, they were vulnerable."

== United States ==
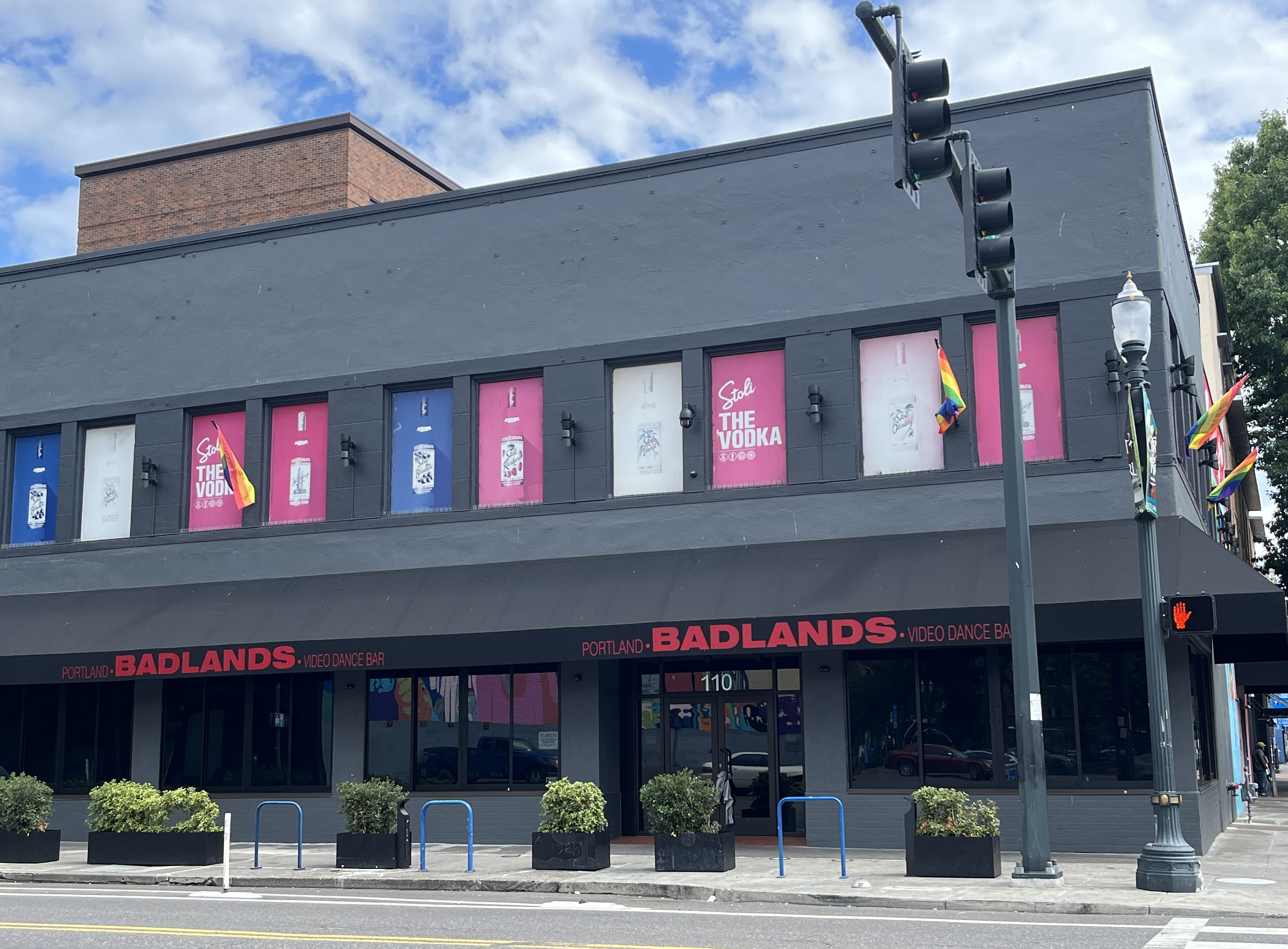
Badlands Portland

According to the U.S. Chamber of Commerce, there are approximately 1.4 million LGBT-owned businesses as of 2024. The National LGBT Chamber of Commerce (NGLCC), a nonprofit organization that serves as a certifying body for Certified LGBT Business Enterprises (LGBTBEs), says LGBTQ+ owned businesses are at least 51 percent "owned, operated, managed and controlled by a person or persons who identify as part of the LGBTQ+ community (including non-binary and gender non-conforming individuals)". New Jersey is the first state to have an official certification process. In addition to the certification, the US government Small Business Administration has a program to promote LGBTQ-owned businesses.

The Greater Seattle Business Association, described as "a business chamber for LGBTQ and allied businesses", was established by nine gay business owners in 1981. In 2021, New York City recognized LGBTQ-owned businesses as part of their program to support and promote minority-owned businesses to provide mentorship, consulting and access to government contracts that promote minority owned businesses.

In an interview with Axios, the Massachusetts Chamber of Commerce executive director, Grace Moreno highlighted that there is a high demand for inclusion in the community and that "young people in particular are more willing to go out of their way to support LGBTQ-owned stores, bars, restaurants and other businesses."

In 2023, a community group celebrated the first annual LGBTQ+ business week to "support queer-owned businesses while simultaneously raising awareness around economic issues for the community." In 2024, it will be celebrated the week of December 2.

=== List of notable LGBTQ-owned businesses in the United States ===
- The 19 Bar, Minneapolis, Minnesota
- 3 Dollar Bill, New York City
- Amazon Bookstore Cooperative, Minneapolis
- Babeland, Seattle
- Babes of Carytown, Richmond, Virginia
- Back 2 Earth, Portland, Oregon
- Badlands Portland, Portland, Oregon
- A Bar of Their Own, Minneapolis
- Big Little News, Seattle
- Blush & Blu, Denver, Colorado
- Cheese & Crack Snack Shop, Portland, Oregon
- Chelo, Portland, Oregon
- Clarklewis
- Coffee Beer, Portland, Oregon
- Cone & Steiner, Seattle
- Coping Cookies, Seattle
- Cupcake Royale, Seattle
- Diesel, Seattle
- Dough Joy, Seattle
- The Easy Vegan, Denver, Colorado
- Either/Or, Portland, Oregon
- Fat's Chicken and Waffles, Seattle
- First Avenue and 7th Street Entry, Minneapolis
- Frelard Tamales, Seattle
- Friendship Kitchen, Portland, Oregon
- Fulcrum Coffee, Seattle
- Glo's, Seattle
- Hilda and Jesse, San Francisco
- Jade Rabbit, Portland, Oregon
- Julia's on Broadway, Seattle
- Kann, Portland, Oregon
- Koko's
- Lesbian Connection, East Lansing, Michigan
- Lil' Deb's Oasis, Hudson New York
- Lipstick Lounge, Nashville, Tennessee
- Lumber Yard Bar, White Center, Washington
- Madison Pub, Seattle
- Meals 4 Heels, Portland, Oregon
- Mis Tacones, Portland, Oregon
- My Sister's Room, Atlanta, Georgia
- Pearl Bar, Houston, Texas
- Pony, Seattle
- Poquitos, Washington
- The Q, New York City
- Queer Bar, Seattle
- R+M Dessert Bar, Seattle
- Red Sauce Pizza, Portland, Oregon
- Rhein Haus Seattle, Seattle
- The Saloon Minneapolis
- Sammich, Portland, Oregon
- Santé Bar, Portland, Oregon
- Seattle Eagle, Seattle
- Sharpe Suiting, Los Angeles
- Shikorina, Seattle
- The Sports Bra, Portland, Oregon
- Stag PDX, Portland, Oregon
- Taqueria Los Puñales, Portland, Oregon
- Temple Pastries, Seattle
- Terra Plata, Seattle
- Tin Shed Garden Cafe, Portland, Oregon
- Tin Table, Seattle
- Twin Peaks Tavern, San Francisco
- Under U 4 Men
- Union Seattle, Seattle
- Whiskey Girl Tavern, Chicago
- The Wildrose, Seattle

== See also ==
- Black-owned business
- List of LGBTQ bars
- StartOut, a startup supporting LGBTQ entrepreneurs
- Woman-owned business
