= Dough Joy =

Doughnut shop chain in Seattle, Washington, U.S.

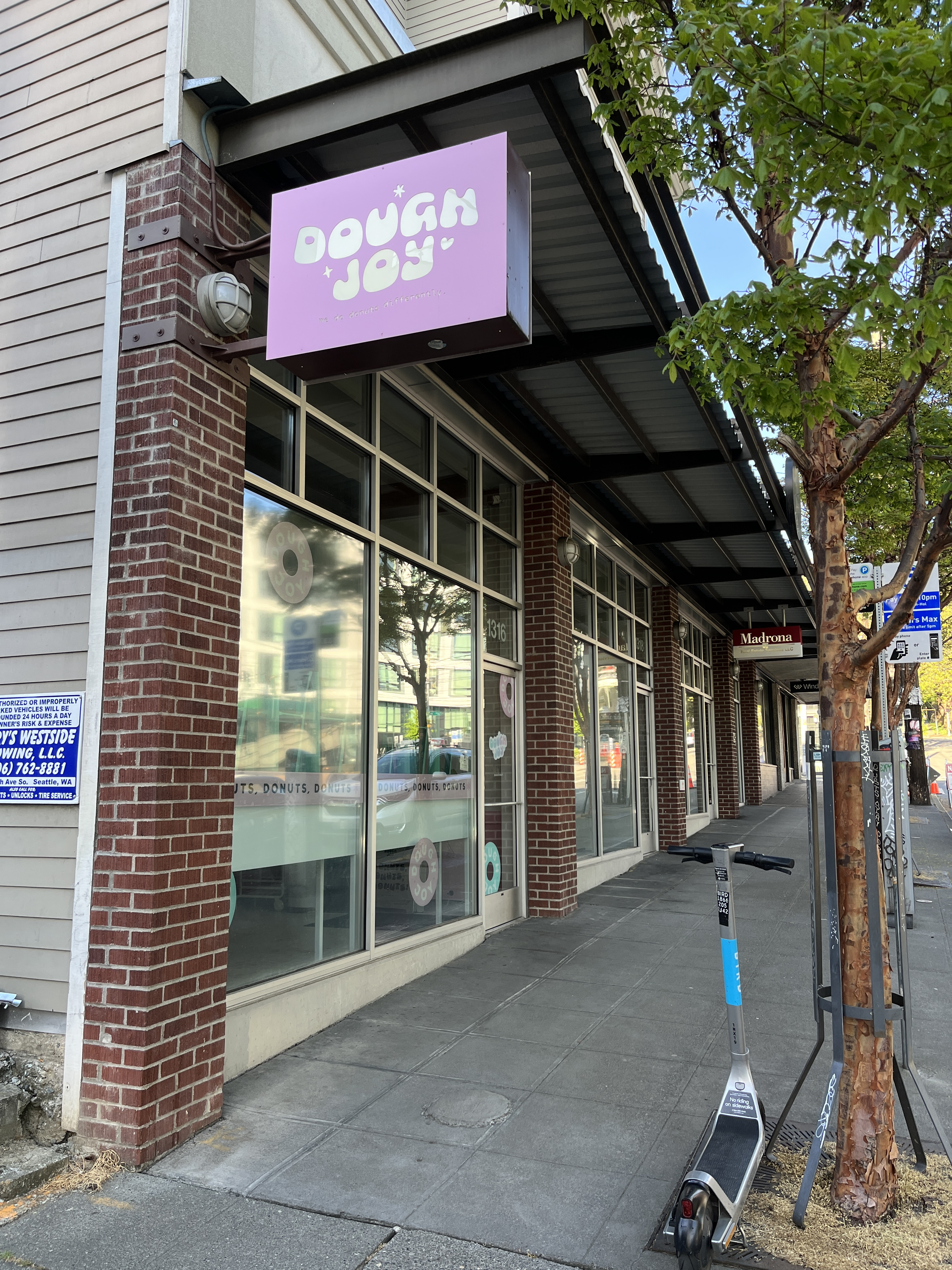
- Exterior of the shop on Capitol Hill in 2023

Restaurant information
- Location: Seattle, King, Washington, United States
- Website: doughjoydonuts.com

Dough Joy is a small chain of doughnut shops in Seattle, in the U.S. state of Washington. The queer-owned business, which specializes in vegan doughnuts, was established by Christopher Ballard and Sean Willis. Dough Joy initially operated from a food truck in the Ballard neighborhood, and later expanded to brick and mortar shops on Capitol Hill and in the West Seattle neighborhood. In 2024, Dough Joy announced plans to open a third shop in Ballard. The Capitol Hill location has closed. The business has garnered a positive reception.

== Description ==
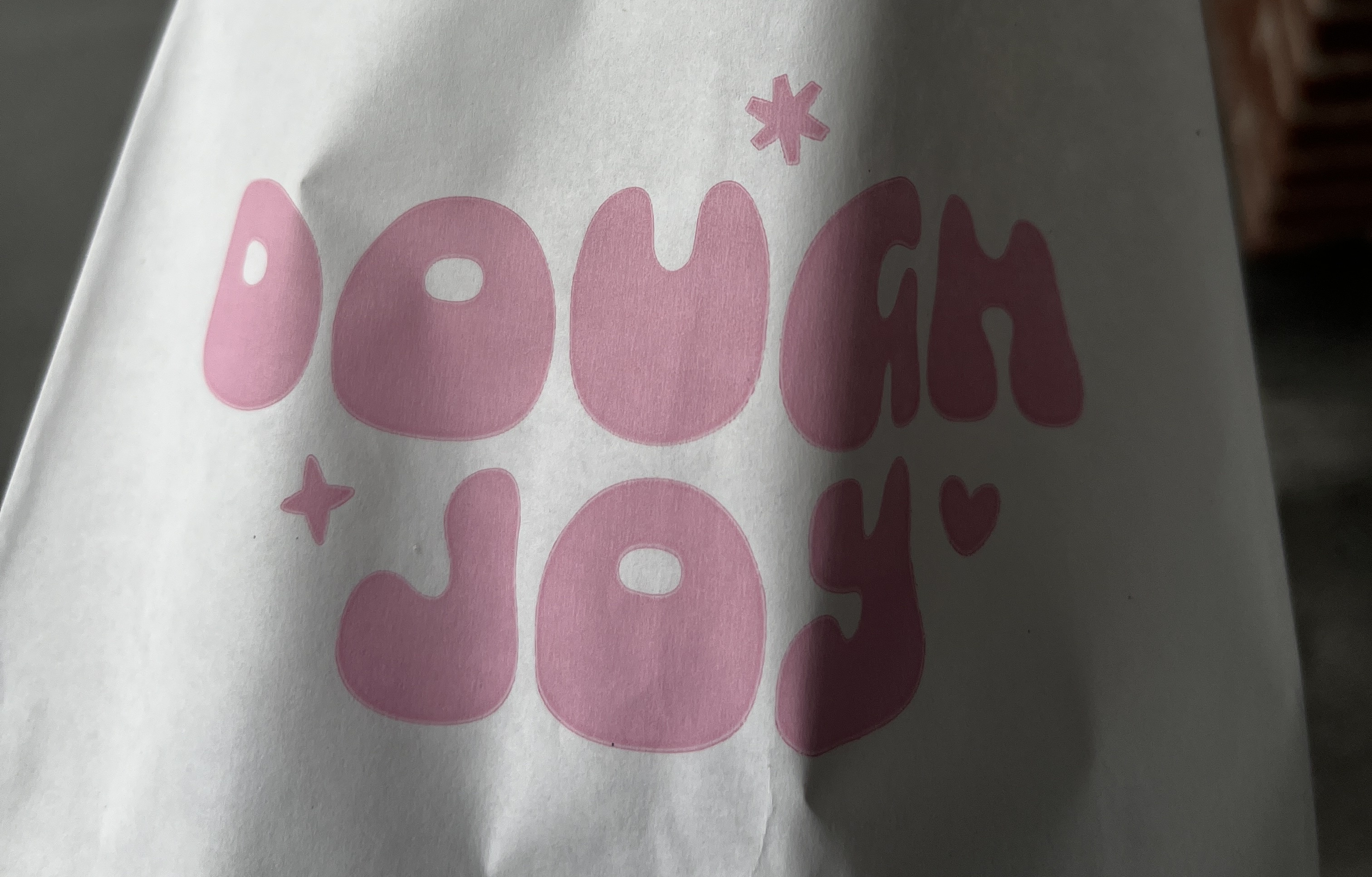
Doughnut in a branded wrapper, 2023

Dough Joy is a small, queer-owned chain of doughnut shops in Seattle, specializing in vegan doughnuts. Varieties include: The Basic B (traditional glazed); the breakfast cereal-inspired Cereal Killer, which uses cereal milk and is topped with fruit-flavored cereal; The Faconator (maple frosting with coconut bacon); PB & HEYYY, which was inspired by a peanut butter and jelly sandwich and has peanut butter icing with strawberry jelly; and Petal to the Metal, a rose-flavored doughnut with pink marble icing. Other flavors have included birthday cake, caramel, carrot cake, chocolate with sprinkles, cookies and cream, cookie butter, everything bagel, french toast, mango con chile, s'mores, sour watermelon, strawberry milkshake, and vanilla Biscoff, as well as a Pride-theme variety with rainbow sprinkles.

== History ==
Dough Joy was established by Christopher Ballard and Sean Willis in May 2021. The business initially operated from a food truck in Ballard, selling out from pre-orders on launch day.

Dough Joy later opened brick and mortar shop on Pike Street, on Capitol Hill. The now-closed Capitol Hill location operated in the space previously occupied by Old School Frozen Custard. Dough Joy also operates in West Seattle, which has a plant shop called Botanic! at the Disco.

In 2024, the business confirmed plans to open a third shop in Ballard.

Dough Joy Lil Dippers, or "doughnut balls", have been available at University of Washington games.

== Reception ==
Zuri Anderson included the business in iHeart's list of "the best new places to eat in 2022". In 2023, Anna Not included Dough Joy in Tasting Table's list of 25 queer-owned vegan eaters "you need to try" in the U.S., and Mark Van Streefkerk and Harry Cheadle included the business in Eater Seattle's list of doughnuts "you should know" in the Seattle metropolitan area. Allecia Vermillion included Dough Joy in Seattle Metropolitan magazine's 2024 overview of the city's best doughnuts.

== See also ==
- LGBTQ culture in Seattle
- List of doughnut shops
- List of food trucks
- List of restaurant chains in the United States
- List of vegetarian and vegan restaurants
