= Glo's =

Restaurant in Seattle, Washington, U.S.

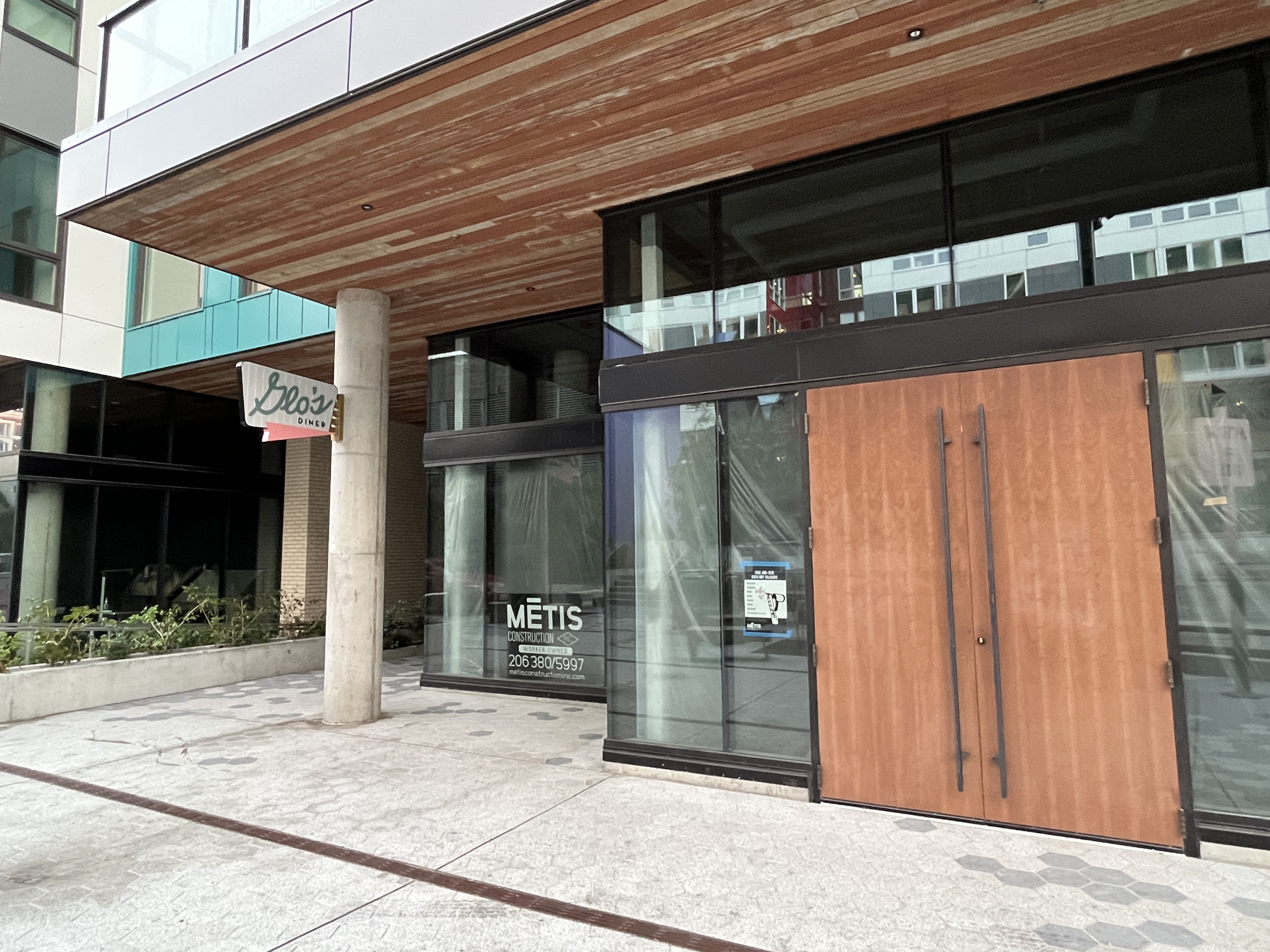
- Exterior of Capitol Hill location under construction in 2022
- Interactive map of Glo's

Restaurant information
- Location: Seattle, Washington, United States
- Coordinates: 47°37′8″N 122°19′12″W

Glo's is a restaurant in Seattle, in the U.S. state of Washington.

== Description ==
Glo's is an LGBTQ-owned restaurant on Capitol Hill. Charles Mudede of The Stranger has described Glo's as a "beloved, very tiny brunch spot". In 2010, Kathryn Robinson of Seattle Metropolitan called Glo's a "goofy breakfast joint".

== History ==
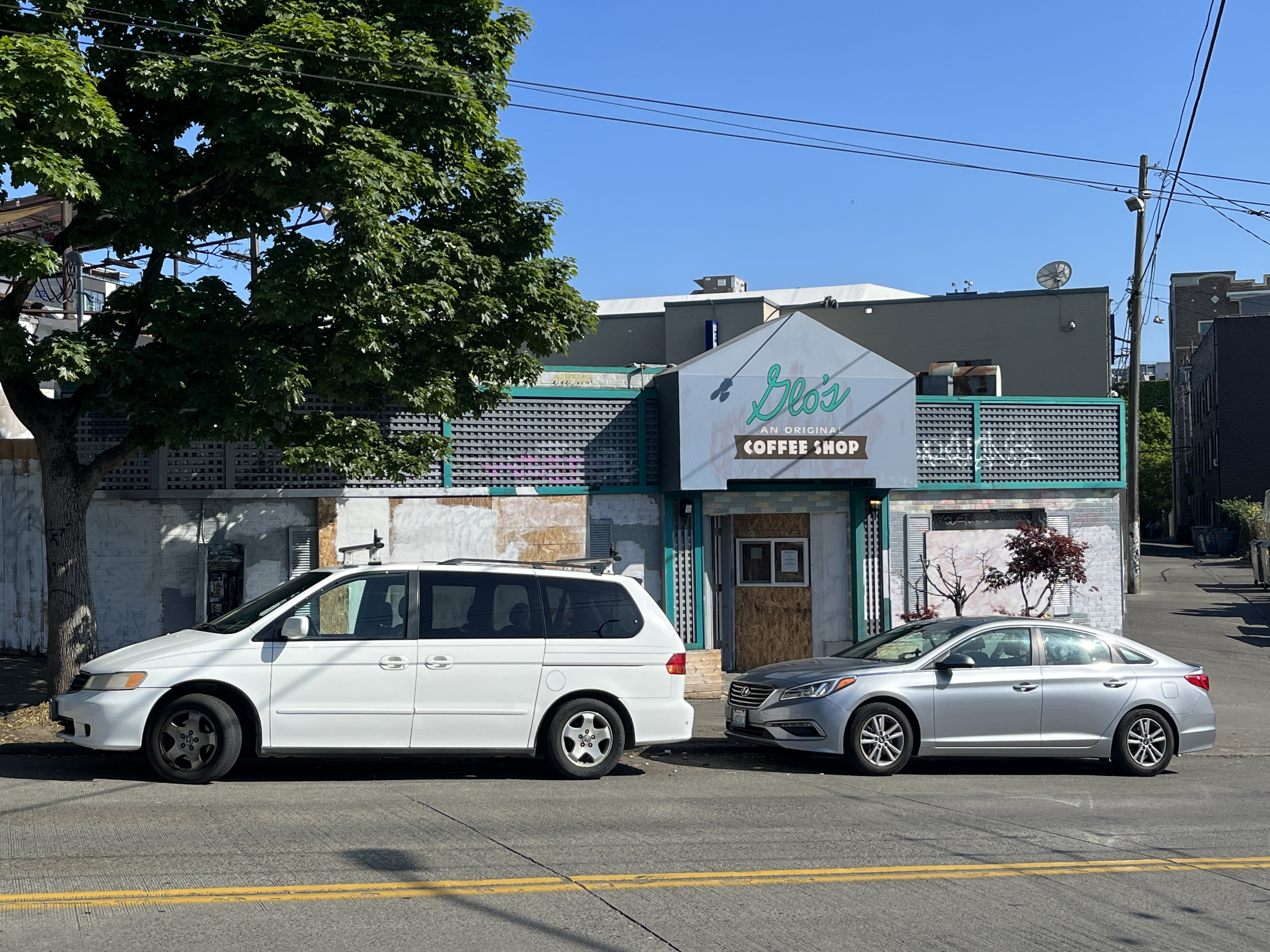
Exterior of the original restaurant in June 2023

In 2021, Eater Seattle reported on the restaurant's planned relocation in 2022. In 2022, a fire forced the original location to close.

== Reception ==
The 2014 edition of Not for Tourists Guide to Seattle says, "Almost puts Grandma's biscuits and gravy to shame. Great on a rainy morning." The 2017 edition says, "Glo's is the place for breakfast (also open late), but be prepared to wait."

In 2018, Time Out Seattle gave the restaurant a rating of 4 on a scale of 5 and said, "Out late on the weekend? Head over to Glo's. This revered greasy spoon in Capitol Hill is the best (and perhaps only) place to get an omelette at 3am on a Friday night. Come for the chow and stay for the characters: on the weekends, the space is packed with interesting people—think hungover musicians and high-strung techies."

In 2021, Eat This, Not That! said, "In 1987, Glo's opened up in Seattle and quickly became the spot for exceptional breakfast fare in a retro setting (we love their neon sign). They're famous for their variety of signature eggs Benedict options, so don't hold back. Hint: Their smoked salmon version has quite the following, so maybe start there." Mark Van Streefkerk and Jade Yamazaki Stewart included the restaurant in Eater Seattle's 2022 list of "12 Spots for Hearty Weekday Breakfasts in Seattle".
