= Pony (Seattle) =

Gay bar in Seattle, Washington, U.S.

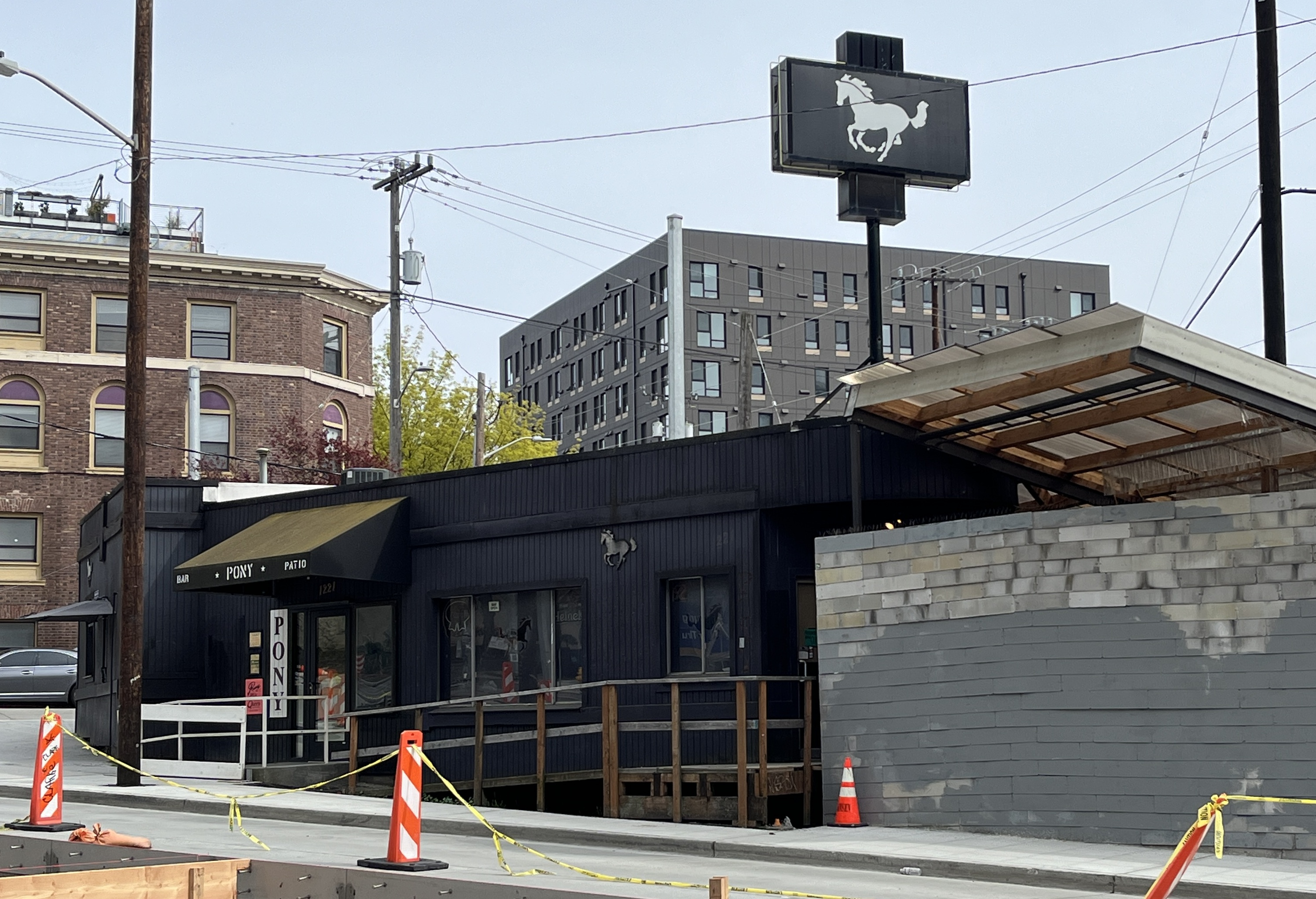
- The bar's exterior in 2024

- Location in Washington
- Address: 1221 E. Madison Street
- Location: Seattle, Washington, U.S.
- Coordinates: 47.61309°N 122.31575°W
- Type: Gay bar

Website
- ponyseattle.com

Pony is a gay bar in Seattle's Capitol Hill neighborhood, in the U.S. state of Washington.

== Description and history ==
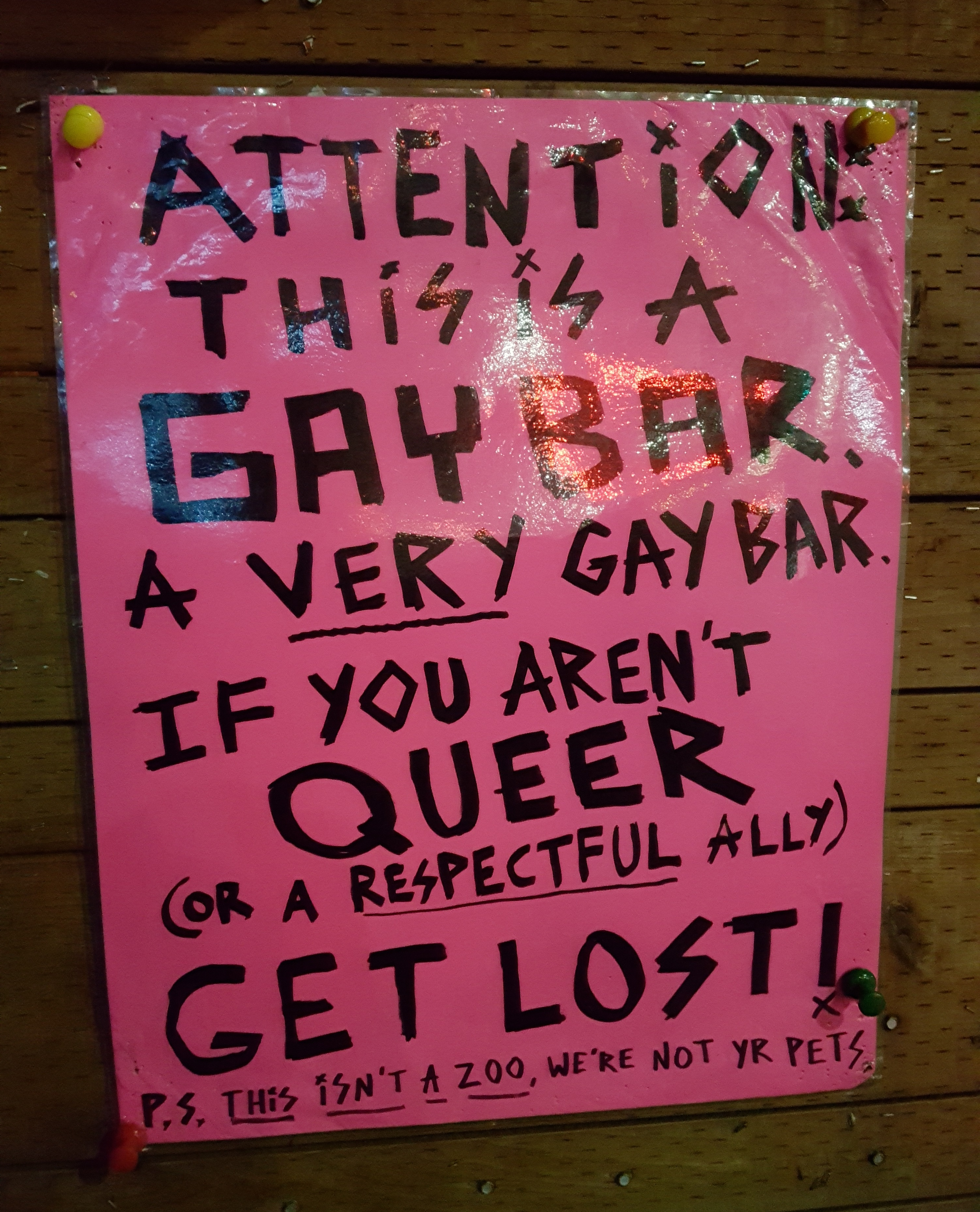
Signage on the bar's exterior, 2018

Pony is an LGBT-owned bar located at 1221 E Madison Street in Seattle's Capitol Hill neighborhood. It is housed in a 1930s building that served as a gas station. Seattle Weekly described Pony as a "one-of-a-kind bar that pays tribute to New York's Castro and West Village bars of the 1970s".

In 2014, in response to the neighborhood's changing demographics, the bar's manager displayed a sign which read, "Attention: This is a gay bar. A very gay bar. If you aren't queer (or a respectful ally), get lost. This isn't a zoo and we're not your pets."

== Reception ==
In 2013, Seattle Weekly readers voted for Pony as the best gay bar in Seattle. The paper's Zach Geballe said of the bar and its clientele:

Let's be blatantly clear: Pony is not a bar for those who only dabble in gay culture. While other Capitol Hill bars try to appeal to both a gay and straight clientele, Pony is unabashedly aimed at gay males. If you were unsure of this upon entering, the gay pornography plastered on almost every inch of the space will reassure you very quickly that you are in fact in a gay bar. Because it doesn't pander to a straight crowd, it remains relevant to several generations of gay guys in Seattle without going too far down the nightclub rabbit hole. Drinks are affordable and (pun intended) stiff, and I'm led to believe that it still serves as one of the city's better meat markets. Oh, and there's a gloryhole in the bathroom, if that's your thing.

The Stranger quipped, "The gays know how to have fun: They know it, you know it, I know it, and Pony is more fun per inch than anywhere in town, if not the world."

== See also ==
- List of LGBTQ bars
