= Frelard Tamales =

Mexican restaurant in Seattle, Washington, U.S.

- Interactive map of Frelard Tamales

Restaurant information
- Established: 2015
- Owners: Osbaldo Hernandez; Dennis Ramey
- Food type: Mexican
- Location: Seattle, Washington, United States
- Coordinates: 47.67567°N 122.3252°W

Frelard Tamales is a Mexican restaurant in Seattle, in the U.S. state of Washington.

== Description ==
The Mexican restaurant specializes in tamales. Varieties include salsa roja pork, salsa verde chicken, and vegan and vegetarian options such as sweet potato and mole or salsa roja and jackfruit. The drink menu has included agua de horchata. Guests can purchase frozen tamales to prepare at home.

== History ==
Owners and spouses Osbaldo Hernandez and Dennis Ramey established in 2015 and began operating at farmers' markets. Plans to open a brick and mortar restaurant were confirmed in 2018.

In 2020, the restaurant served free food to select people impacted by the COVID-19 pandemic. Frelard also sold gift sets during the pandemic, with food and other products by local businesses.

Frelard has been a vendor at the U District Street Fair, and has celebrated LGBT pride month.

== Reception ==
In 2021, Kierra Elfalan of KING-TV said the restaurant "brings rich flavors, Hispanic culture to Seattle". Writers for Eater Seattle included Frelard in multiple lists in 2022, including "16 Marvelous Mexican Restaurants in the Seattle Area", "Some of the Best Inexpensive Meals in Seattle", "14 Fantastic Green Lake Restaurants", " and "The 38 Essential Restaurants in Seattle".

== See also ==
- LGBT-owned business
- List of Mexican restaurants
