= Hilda and Jesse =

Restaurant in San Francisco, California, U.S.

Coordinates: 37°48′00″N 122°24′40″W

- Interactive map of Hilda and Jesse

Restaurant information
- Established: November 1, 2021
- Owners: Rachel Sillcocks and Ollie K.C. Liedags
- Chef: Ollie K.C. Liedags
- Food type: Contemporary American
- Dress code: Casual
- Rating: (Michelin Guide)
- Location: 701 Union Street, San Francisco, California, 94133, United States
- Seating capacity: 30
- Website: hildaandjessesf.com

Hilda and Jesse is a Michelin-starred, queer-owned restaurant in the North Beach neighborhood of San Francisco, California, United States. Previously a pop-up, the restaurant opened in November 2021.

== History ==
Rachel Sillcocks and Ollie K.C. Liedags, both experienced chefs, trialed Hilda and Jesse as a brunch pop-up in the Richmond District in 2019, partly inspired by Liedags' family heritage of Latvian cuisine and named for two of their grandparents. They opened the restaurant on Union Street in North Beach on November 1, 2021. At opening, it served a tasting menu brunch; a five-course dinner was later added.

Hilda and Jesse was added to the Michelin Guide Bib Gourmand list in November 2022 and in November 2024 was awarded a Michelin star, with Sillcocks also receiving an award for outstanding service. Liedags was also a semifinalist for the 2024 James Beard Award for Best Chef, California.

== Restaurant ==
Hilda and Jesse's co-owners, Liedags, who is the chef, and Sillcocks, who is general manager, are both queer and describe their cooking and decor as queer. They have advertised their pancakes as the "gayest pancakes ever" and as made by a "soft butch chef", and sourcing from "queer farmers and wine producers". Designed by Noz Nozawa, the restaurant has a zebra-striped bathroom and is otherwise decorated in bright colors including checkered floors, striped walls, and murals, producing an effect a San Francisco Chronicle reviewer likened to "an American diner in Pee-Wee's Play House" and another reviewer to "Pee-Wee's Playhouse: Miami Edition". The former characterized the food as "dissident comfort food", including for example an avocado toast made with sweet potato tempura instead of bread and topped with sour cream infused with onion and shaved horseradish.

Hilda and Jesse has become known as a "queer oasis". In December 2021, shortly after it opened, there was online backlash after staff asked three uniformed San Francisco Police Department officers who had come there to eat to leave because of staff discomfort with weapons in a safe space. The owners apologized and said that police were welcome when off-duty and unarmed. They have since periodically shared screenshots on social media of negative reviews that they attribute to their political positions. Liedags wore a "Protect trans youth" T-shirt to the Michelin awards event.

== Reception ==
The Michelin Guide singles out Hilda and Jesse for "what may well be the Bay Area's most creative and ambitious take on brunch", and describes the cooking as "often bold and brash, a total riot of flavors mixed with stellar ingredients". In the San Francisco Chronicle, it was featured in the 2025 list of 100 best restaurants in the Bay Area, and on the 2026 list rose from 92nd place to 32nd, with the reviewer describing the food as "enchanting" in its "skillful balance" and the dining experience as feeling like "nothing short of a party". As of May 2026, Eater SF lists Hilda and Jesse as one of the most beautiful restaurants in San Francisco.

== See also ==
- List of Michelin-starred restaurants in California
