= Madison Pub =

Gay bar in Seattle, Washington, U.S.

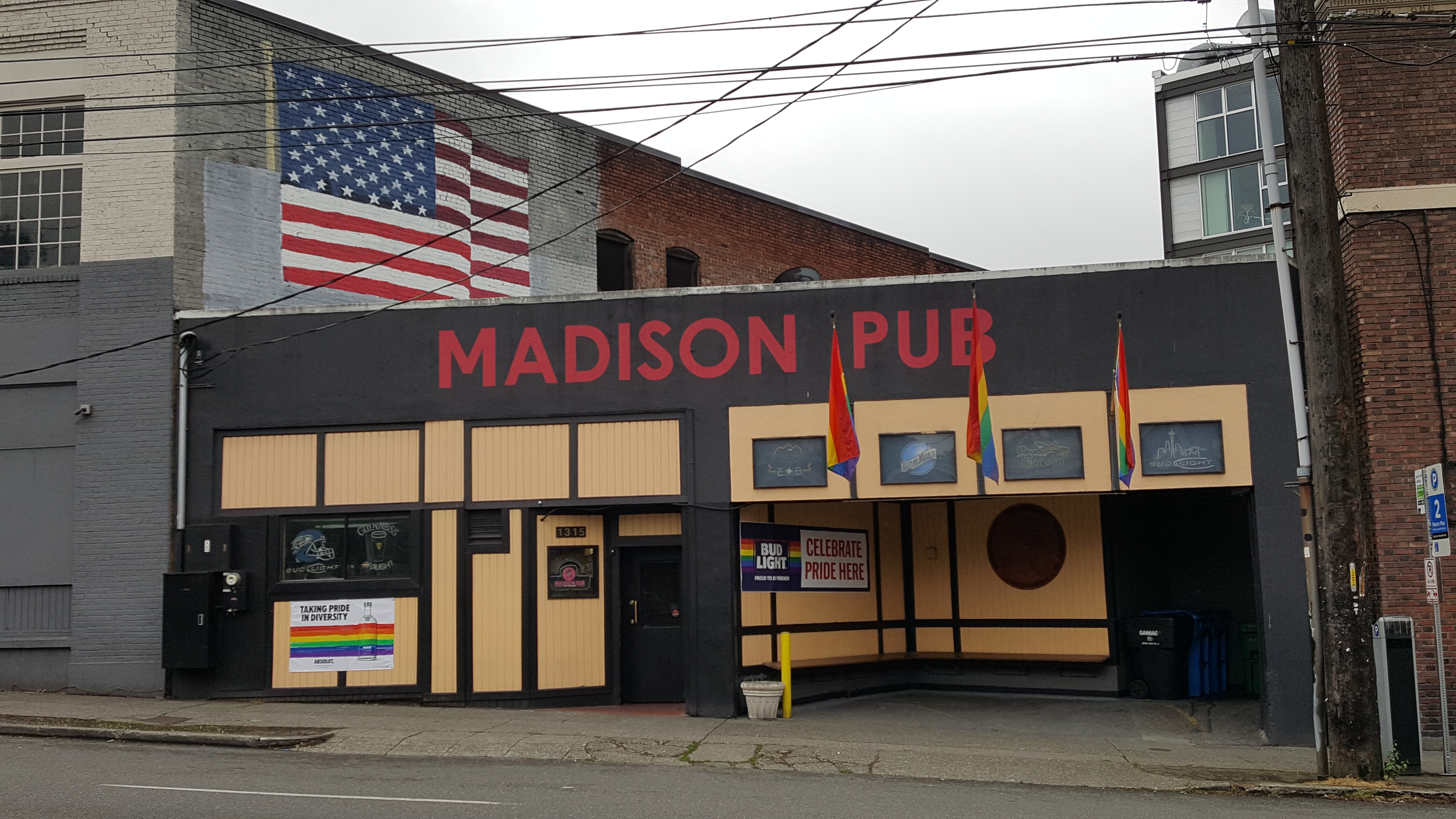
- The bar's exterior in 2018
- Interactive map of Madison Pub
- Address: 1315 East Madison Street
- Location: Seattle, Washington, U.S.
- Coordinates: 47.613442°N 122.314883°W

Website
- madisonpub.com

Madison Pub is a gay bar in Seattle, Washington, United States.

== Description ==
Madison Pub is an LGBT-owned gay sports bar located at 1315 East Madison Street in Seattle's Capitol Hill neighborhood. The Stranger has said the pub is "rumored to be the friendliest and least stressful gay bar on all of Capitol Hill", with loyal clientele. The newspaper has also described the venue as a "popular, crowded, and unpretentious" sports bar "for men who like men". The bar offers darts, pinball, pool, pull-tabs, trivia, and video games.

== History ==
Chet Harold opened the bar in May 1986. Madison Pub did not operate as a gay bar until July 1986. Michael Lull owned the bar starting in 1995, and Roland Hyre became the bar's third owner on December 31, 2010. The pub has sponsored local basketball, rugby, softball, tennis, and volleyball teams.

In the 2009 ricin incident, Madison Pub was one of eleven Seattle gay bars that received letters threatening to poison patrons with ricin; the bar was the only one to not participate in a pub crawl organized in defiance of the threat.

== Reception ==
Madison Pub ranked number 38 on NewNowNext.com's (Logo TV) 2018 list of the 50 most popular gay bars in the U.S.

== See also ==
- List of LGBTQ bars
