= Coffee Beer =

Vegan restaurant in Portland, Oregon, U.S.

- The restaurant's exterior, 2026
- Interactive map of Coffee Beer

Restaurant information
- Owner: Phillip Stewart
- Food type: Vegan
- Location: 4142 Southeast 42nd Avenue, Portland, Multnomah, Oregon, 97206, United States
- Coordinates: 45.4928°N 122.6188°W
- Website: coffeeebeeer.com

Coffee Beer (stylized in all caps and sometimes called CoffeeBeer or Coffee-Beer) is a vegan restaurant in Portland, Oregon, United States. It operates as a coffee shop and bar in southeast Portland's Creston-Kenilworth neighborhood, serving various coffee, espresso, and mixed drinks, as well as burritos, hot dogs, pastries, sandwiches, and other food options. Coffee Beer has garnered a positive reception and was deemed one the nation's best vegan restaurants by VegNews in 2023.

== Description ==
The coffee shop and bar Coffee Beer operates on 42nd Avenue in southeast Portland's Creston-Kenilworth neighborhood. In 2019, Pete Cottell of Willamette Week described Coffee Beer as a "bodega-cafe hybrid" that "actually doubles as a design and marketing project" for one of the owners. The LGBTQ-owned, vegan restaurant has indoor and outdoor seating, and hosts events such as VHS film nights.

=== Menu ===
Coffee Beer has coffee drinks with plant milks, slushies (including alcoholic options), and other mixed beverages. Among espresso drinks are Americanos with cardamom or CBD shots, as well as cappuccinos, lattes, mochas, and an iced "cospresso", which has Coca-Cola or ginger ale. Coffee Beer also has cold brews with various flavored syrup options, including caramel, cardamom, hazelnut, lavender, and pistachio. The restaurant also has drinks with whisky, as well as canned and draft beer from various breweries including Modern Times, North Coast, and pFriem. Named after one of the co-owners, the Phillip's Cup has Fernet, Coca-Cola, and lime. The Cuddler has Tin Cup whisky, vanilla cream soda, and an espresso shot. Other drink options include ginger spice chai, hot chocolate, and Thai tea with turmeric.

The food menu includes Phatt Dawgs, described as vegan variants of the hot dogs available at convenience stores, as well as Higher Taste burritos, including a cheesy tofu scramble variety and a breakfast burrito with baked tofu, roasted potatoes, and vegan cheddar. The Fiery Fiesta burrito has rice, sautéed vegetables, hot sauce, and lime. The bean and cheese burrito has pinto beans, rice, and vegan cheddar. Coffee Beer has used Cultured Kindness cheese and stocked sandwiches from Snackrilege as well as pastries from Shoofly Vegan Bakery.

== History ==
Interior shelves with merchandise

Coffee Beer current storefront opened in March 2018. Previously, the business operated as a pop-up restaurant. Coffee Beer is co-owned by artist Phillip Stewart. When the brick and mortar restaurant opened, Stewart also owned the adjacent convenience and grocery store called Cutiee Buys. Cutiee Boys subsequently closed on December 31, 2023.

Coffee Beer offers branded merchandise such as koozies, mugs, and lapel pins. Some of the products have "blunt slogans that extol the virtues of a bullshit-free life powered by caffeine and alcohol", according to Cottell of Willamette Week. A senior pug called A$AP Douglas has been described as the business's mascot.

Like many restaurants, Coffee Beer operated via take-out during the COVID-19 pandemic. In March 2023, Brooke Jackson-Glidden of Eater Portland said the business "takes the COVID-19 precautions more seriously than most these days". Coffee Beer has hosted the vegan Venezuelan restaurant El Salto as a pop-up. Coffee Beer was added to Vegetarian Resource Group's guide to vegan and vegetarian restaurants in the U.S. and Canada in 2026.

== Reception ==
The restaurant's interior in 2026

In 2018, Thomas Alexander Ross of the Portland Mercury opined, "it's honestly hard to tell if they're a coffee and beer company or a coffee and beer merchandise company". Noting the abundance of branded merchandise, he wrote, "at this late hour in capitalism, I'm genuinely confused about whether it's a perfectly humane synthesis of service, makerism, and community, or a deeply embedded retail machine. Either way, I bought a lot of pins, drank some beers, and will happily do it all again." Pete Cottell included Coffee Beer in Willamette Week's 2019 list of "our nine favorite new coffee shops".

The business ranked third in the Best Vegan Coffee Shop and Best Vegan Bar categories of VegNews's 2023 overview of the nation's 28 best vegan restaurants. The business won in the Best Vegan Coffee shop category in 2025. The magazine's Tanya Flink also ranked Coffee Beer tenth in a 2025 list of 18 vegan-friendly bars and breweries, saying the business offers beer and coffee "to an incredibly high standard". Nathan Williams included Coffee Beer in Eater Portland's 2023 overview of recommended restaurants in Creston-Kenilworth.

== See also ==
- List of vegetarian and vegan restaurants
