= Fulcrum Coffee =

Coffee company based in Seattle, Washington, U.S.

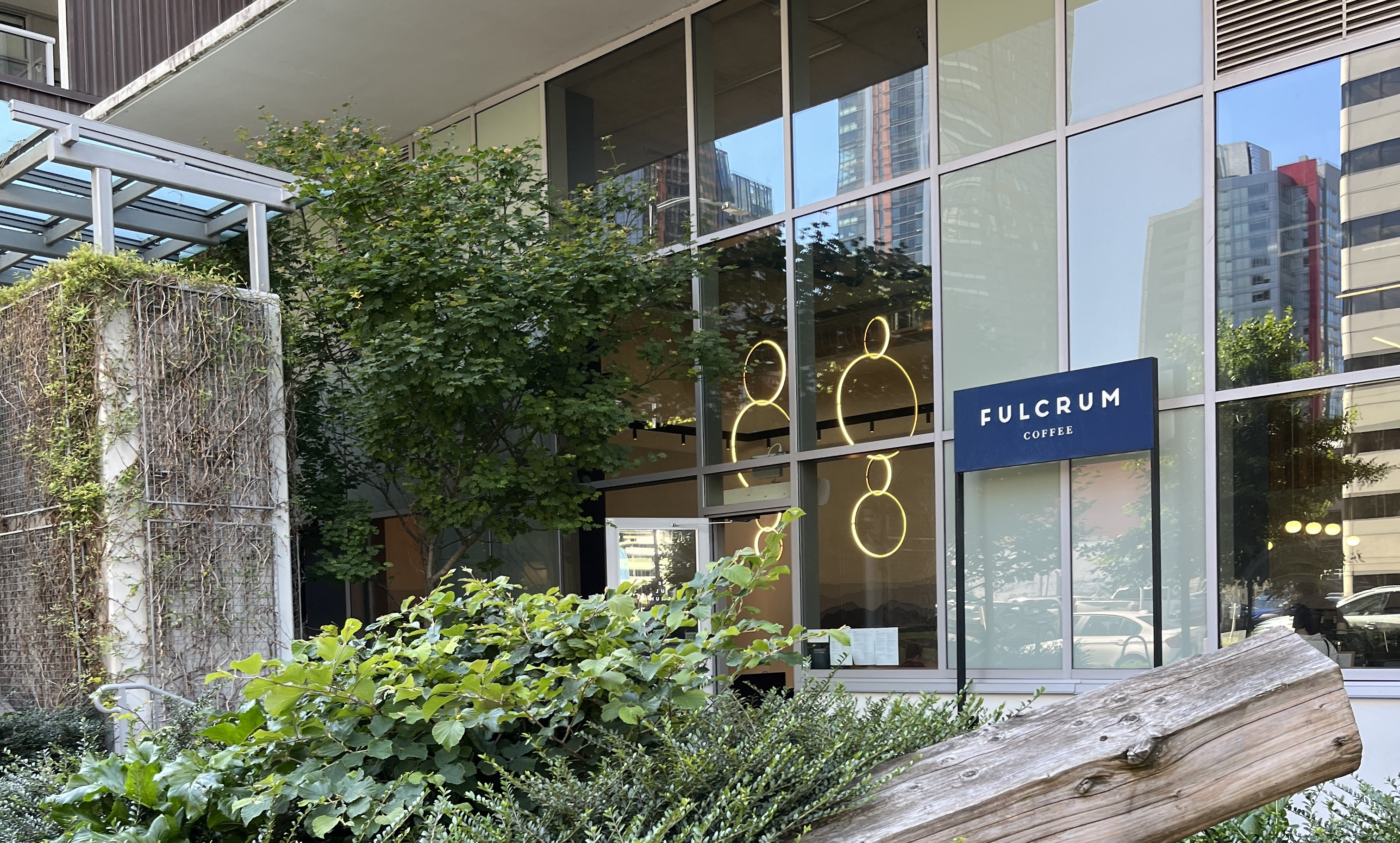
- Exterior of the shop in Belltown, Seattle, 2024
- Interactive map of Fulcrum Coffee

Restaurant information
- Established: 2012
- Owner: Blas Alfaro
- Location: Seattle, King, Washington, United States
- Coordinates: 47.5611°N 122.3376°W

Fulcrum Coffee Roasters, or simply Fulcrum Coffee, is a coffee company based in Seattle, in the U.S. state of Washington. The business operates a roastery in SoDo as well as a shop in Belltown known as Fulcrum Café.

== Description ==
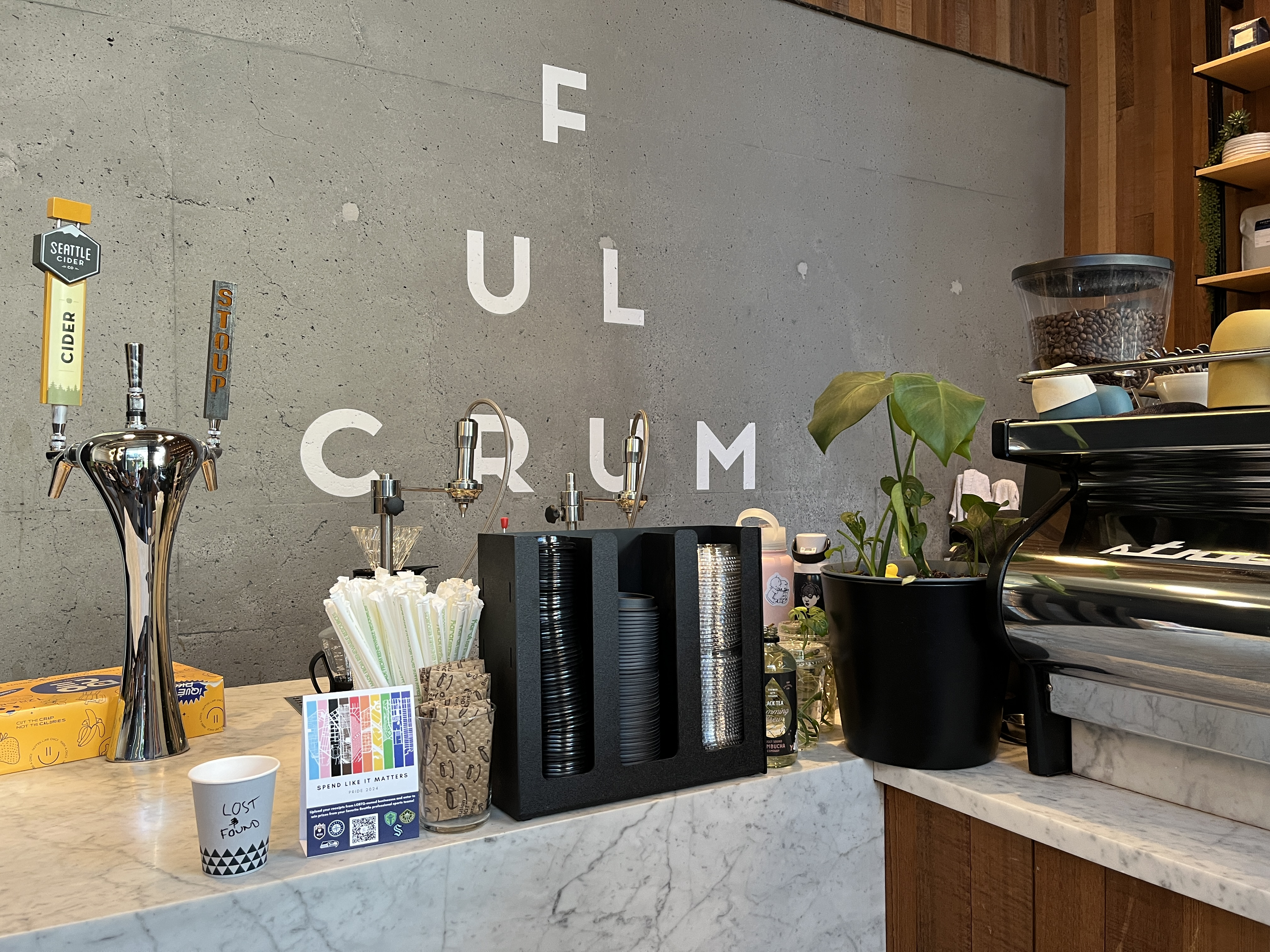
Interior of the Belltown cafe, 2024

The Seattle-based coffee company Fulcrum has operated a roastery in the SoDo neighborhood, as well as a cafe called Fulcrum Café in the Belltown neighborhood. Fulcrum has served lattes, as well as canned and nitro cold brews, including one called the Espresso Cherry Cola. Other coffee drinks include: the Ruby Mocha; the Snuggle Me, Sesame; and the Sweater Weather, which has chilies, cinnamon, vanilla, and steamed oat milk. The Nimbus is a chilled espresso with mulled-apple-rosehip-cascara syrup and orange zest. Seasonal drinks have included a coconut taro latte and a mocha with Valrhona Cocoa, cinnamon simple syrup, and chile flakes. Among food options is a granola bar cookie.

== History ==
Fulcrum was established with the merging of Silver Cup and Urban City Coffee in 2012. The LGBTQ-owned business had approximately 30 employees in 2021. Coffee farmer Blas Alfaro is a co-owner.

== Reception ==
Naomi Tomky included Fulcrum in Thrillist's 2020 list of Seattle's best craft coffee establishments. Jen Woo ranked the business thirteenth in Time Out Seattle's 2021 overview of the city's best coffee. Mark Van Streefkerk, and Harry Cheadle included Fulcrum in Eater Seattle's 2024 list of thirteen "essential" coffee shops in the city.
