= Cupcake Royale =

Chain of cupcake shops based in Seattle, Washington, U.S.

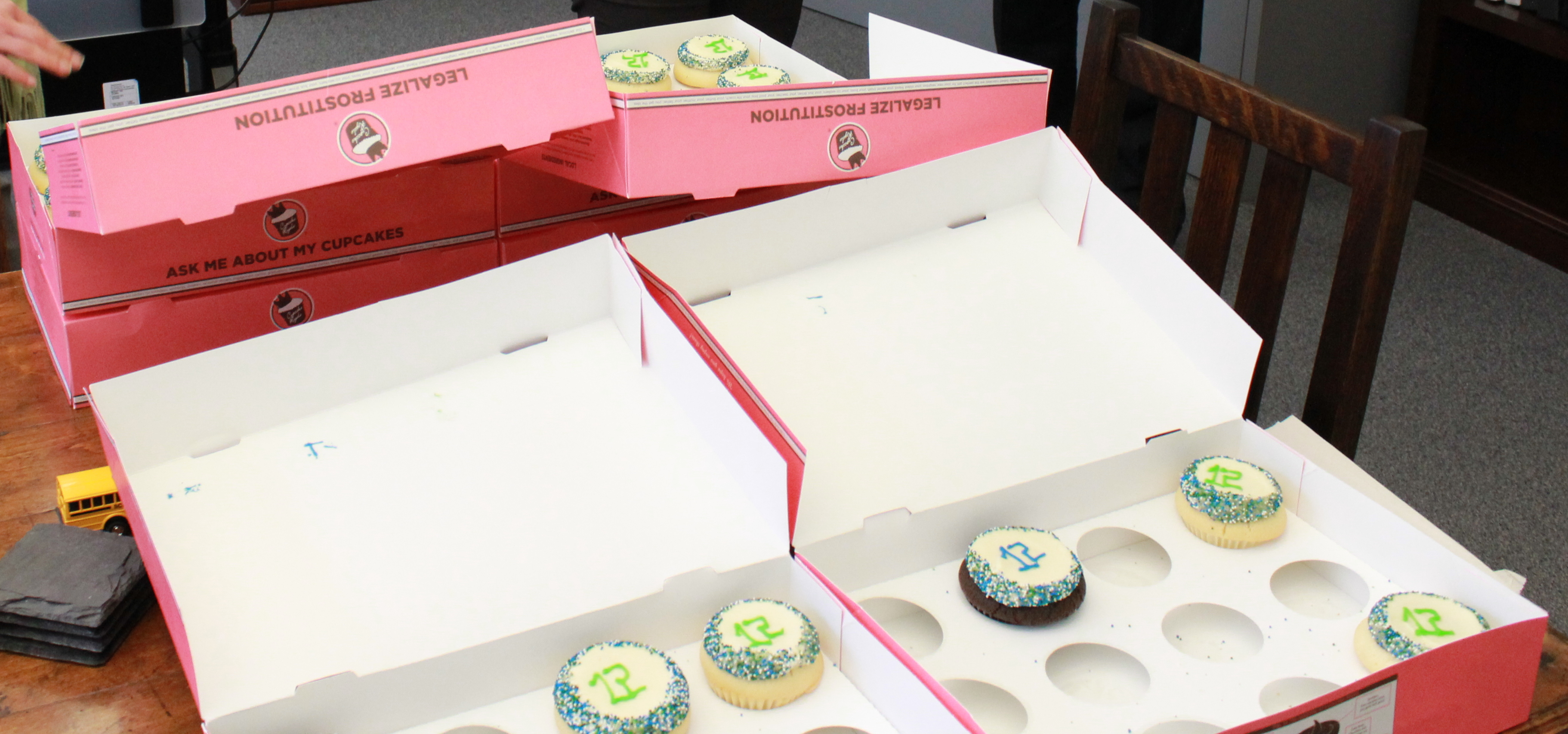
- Box of cupcakes from Cupcake Royale

Restaurant information
- Established: 2003
- Owner: Jody Hall
- Location: Seattle, King, Washington, United States
- Website: cupcakeroyale.com

Cupcake Royale is a chain of cupcake shops based in Seattle, Washington, United States. Established in 2003, the business has operated in the city's Ballard, Madrona, and West Seattle neighborhoods, and on Capitol Hill.

== Description ==
Based in Seattle, queer-owned Cupcake Royale offers standard size and miniature cupcakes in a variety of flavors. In addition to cupcakes, the business has served cakes, ice cream, and ice cream sandwich cookies.

== History ==
Cupcake Royale was established in 2003. The business is owned by Jody Hall.

Cupcake Royale operated in Queen Anne from 2013 to 2019. The Ballard location closed in 2024, after operating for approximately 20 years.

== See also ==
- List of bakeries
- List of restaurant chains in the United States
