= Lil' Deb's Oasis =

Restaurant and art installation in Hudson, New York

- Interactive map of Lil' Deb's Oasis

Restaurant information
- Established: 2015; 11 years ago
- Closed: October 12, 2026
- Owner: Halo Perez-Gallardo
- Previous owners: Hannah Black and Carla Perez-Gallardo
- Food type: Tropical comfort
- Location: 747 Columbia St., Hudson, New York
- Coordinates: 42.24728°N 73.78080°W
- Website: www.lildebsoasis.com

Lil' Deb's Oasis was a tropical restaurant, bar, and art installation in Hudson, New York, in the upper Hudson Valley. The restaurant has a unique menu, self-described as "tropical comfort food" and including elements of South Asian and Latin American cuisines while sourcing ingredients from the Hudson Valley. Lil' Deb's operates as an interactive art project, performance venue, and community gathering space, as well as operating as a business. The restaurant is oriented toward LGBTQ cultural themes, defining its hospitality style, and aims to be an LGBT-inclusive space, including hosting queer performance events. The restaurant is positively reviewed by critics, and has seen national media coverage.

The restaurant was established in 2015 as a pop-up run once a week within Debbie's Lil' Restaurant, a traditional diner. In 2016, it was permanently established upon the diner owner's retirement. Lil' Deb's has hosted events and changed its décor numerous times during its operation. During the COVID-19 pandemic in 2020-21, the restaurant temporarily closed, though its staff operated a pop-up nearby. The restaurant began operating a community fridge to benefit local residents, and donated profit from each of its dishes to racial justice organizations amid the George Floyd protests.

The restaurant closed permanently in October 2026 due to the sale of the building it occupied and ongoing issues with debt and profitability.

== Attributes ==
The restaurant is located on Columbia Street in Hudson, New York, where it occupies a storefront in a quiet area that is a short walk from the center of the city. The restaurant serves food and alcoholic drinks, and is partly an art installation and performance venue. The restaurant utilizes local farms and artists. Lil' Deb's is open for dinner service from 5-10 p.m., and for a time sold smoothies from a streetside window from 11 to 3. The owners never considered lunch service, and prepare food in the hours leading up to the restaurant's dinner service.

The space is LGBT-inclusive, defined by its queer hospitality. It also hosts queer-oriented events, including late-night drag shows. It hosts a monthly late-night event, the Queer Night of Performance, where the dining room is transformed into a strobing neon runway to feature drag, fashion, and art.

Lil' Deb's has a menu with unique flavor combinations that changes often. The cuisine has been described by Lil' Deb's owners as "tropical comfort food". The two chefs utilized dishes and techniques from their heritage, including Halo Perez Gallardo's Ecuadorian heritage and Hannah Black's childhood home of Alabama. The two also incorporated South Asian elements, after working together on a Vietnamese-inspired food truck. Most ingredients are sourced locally from the Hudson Valley, including meats, greens, potatoes, herbs, and other vegetables; plantains, coconuts, pineapples, and other tropical ingredients have to be sourced from countries with tropical climates. Lil' Deb's is affordably priced, as the restaurant targets local residents and artists, as opposed to the wealthy visitors who frequent much of Hudson.

Dishes have included salsa macha with crudité, a charred carrot and daikon salad with pomegranate, cabbage slaw with charred scallions and a lime dressing, chicken braised in a charred lime and peanut broth, mole-spiced ribs with orange and kombucha, and a tropical trifle with coconut and rum. The restaurant also features a whole fried fish special, with elements that change daily. Another menu staple is a non-food menu item, such as a tableside serenade, sniff of local herbs, or a facial spritz. Wine is listed in an untraditional format, with poetic and bizarre nouns and adjectives describing each wine. The descriptions given sometimes appear nonsensical, though they make the wines approachable to guests. Adventurous guests are encouraged to select wine based on non-wine-related questions, allowing the staff to select a wine based on a guest's mood and desires.

Clientele is diverse, including visitors on day trips to the Hudson Valley, locals, natural wine enthusiasts, and older diners.

Lil' Deb's does not advertise, instead relying on word of mouth and social media. All employees are paid the same wage, including cooks, servers, and dishwashers, and all tips are pooled and split evenly among the staff. Lil' Deb's staff refer to each other as "Chef", not fully seriously, to have collective respect and de-emphasize the title.

=== Design ===
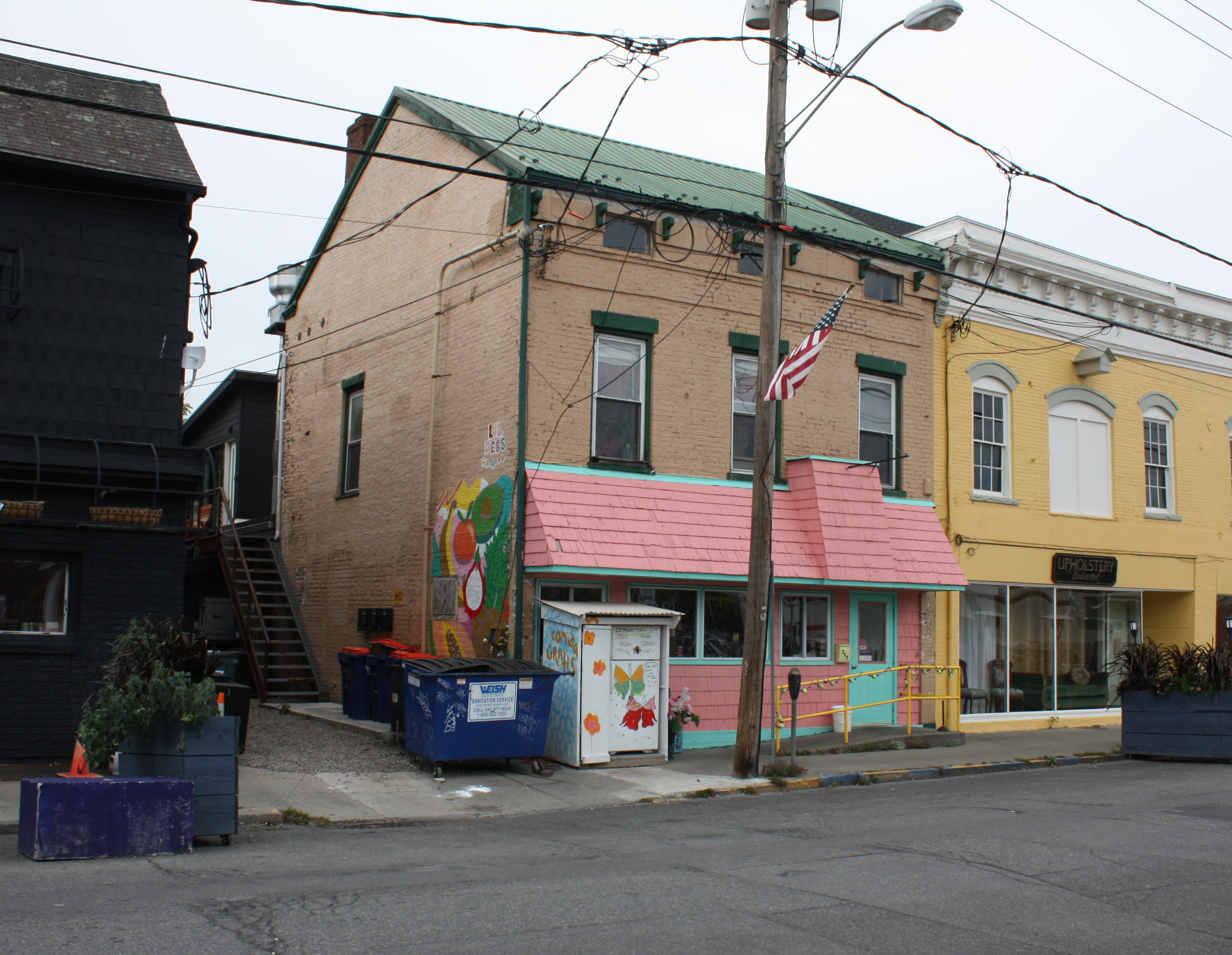
The restaurant's exterior

The exterior resembles a colorful roadside diner, as well as its prior use as a Stewart's Shop, though its shingles are painted in peach or coral pink, and it features turquoise trim, blue neon signs, and a Black Lives Matter sign.

The interior is extensively detailed and colorful. Its décor changes regularly, though at times its walls are painted coral pink, floors are patterned with a tropical plant motif, tablecloths have floral prints, lights glow purple, placemats have laminated collages, its chrome barstools have pastel or floral print seats, and unusual items are utilized to decorate, including neon green tennis balls (used on the base of chair legs in the dining room) and garden hoses. Shingles inside are painted turquoise with bright pink trim. Television screens by the bar play a video of a nude male burlesque, and stickers read "Will Schlep for Food" and "If U Gay, Perfect". The owners have considered the space as much a community art project as it is a business. It was designed with the help of the owners' artist friends, paid back in credits to eat at the restaurant.

== History ==
The restaurant space at 747 Columbia Street was once home to a Stewart's Shop. It later became home to Debbie's Lil' Restaurant, a traditional roadside diner owned by Debbie Fiero which operated for about 30 years. The diner served late-night crowd from nearby bars, and later, breakfasts and lunch. Lil' Deb's Oasis was founded by Hannah Black and Carla Perez-Gallardo in 2015 to share their creativity with friends and transform the diner space nightly, serving dinners family-style on Tuesdays there.

Debbie Fiero retired in 2016 and asked if Black and Perez-Gallardo wished to take over the space and its lease. The two, along with friends and community members, renovated the space into the present-day restaurant.

Perez-Gallardo and Black are both are artists and chefs. They created the space as an art installation as well as a restaurant, the result of their interest in large-format experiential installations. Perez-Gallardo studied studio art at the nearby Bard College, while Black studied painting at the Rhode Island School of Design. Black had worked in numerous well-regarded restaurants, and the pair had collaborated on food projects in numerous places. At the time, they were operating Table|Table, a catering company. The duo pooled $50,000, without the help of outside investors, to start the business. They named it after the former diner and called it an oasis as they said it acts as a refuge from any outside unhappiness.

While the restaurant underwent renovations from January to April 2019, its staff operated tropical food pop-ups throughout the Northeast. The restaurant also earned a James Beard award nomination in 2019, when its chefs were nominated for the "Best Chef: Northeast" category, and became semifinalists, one of four restaurants outside New York City to make the list.

In 2020 and 2021, amid the COVID-19 pandemic in New York, the restaurant was closed for most of a year and a half. For several months in this time and amid renovations, it operated as Fuego 69 in the back of the nearby Rivertown Lodge, offering "pescatarian hippie food" and donating 69 cents of each item sold to racial justice and community organizations, amid the George Floyd protests. Also around the time of the pandemic, the restaurant began incubating other ideas, including Circles, a "postmodern, transgender circular experience" created by a former staff member and chef, Tepper. These pop-up events have involved family and friends of the restaurant enjoying unique pizzas and bagels. Circles has gone on to open its own brick and mortar in Hudson.

Lil' Deb's reopened in May 2021 with a new staff. Hannah Black stepped back from the business, leaving Perez-Gallardo as sole proprietor and head-chef. Julia Johnson became General Manager and has been an important collaborator in the new chapter of the business. In 2021 Black and Perez-Gallardo were nominated again for Best Chef New York by the James Beard Foundation, and the restaurant was nominated for Outstanding Hospitality. It was nominated for Outstanding Hospitality again in 2022, and its cookbook Please Wait to be Tasted was nominated for a James Beard media award for restaurant and professional writing.

In response to the COVID pandemic in 2020, Lil' Deb's collaborated with Hudson Community Fridge project and many local volunteers and opened a community fridge, a refrigerator for those in need of food. It keeps ingredients donated by the community and open for anyone to take, available anytime. The restaurant and outside donors donate food products to the fridge.

Perez-Gallardo placed the restaurant up for sale in late 2025. Perez-Gallardo announced in June 2026 that the restaurant would close, in part due to the landlord's impending sale of the building, and the impact of winter weather, which caused unexpected closures. The restaurant's final night of service will be 12 October 2026.

== Reception and influence ==
The entire experience is in the tradition of mythical auberges in some part of provincial France or Italy or Yunnan, where a family with its own quirks and ways serves delicious food on its own terms.

— Review by The Art of Eating, 2018

The restaurant has been positively reviewed by critics. Vogue titled it "one of Hudson's best—and funkiest—eateries". Bon Appétit referred to its food as "knockout", and that its décor was on-par with an art installation. Chronogram described its food as "saturated with flavor and exquisitely balanced, exotic and familiar". The Art of Eating described its food as "very, very good...homey and special, comforting, and transportive". The restaurant was also positively reviewed by the Times Union, Albany's daily newspaper. In 2021, Thrillist included it in a list of 11 favorite queer-owned restaurants nationwide.

The restaurant has influenced numerous projects, as current and former staff members create art and food projects. Among them is Ale Campos's "All the Bodies", an annual LGBT pride event hosted since 2018, named after Lil' Deb's inclusive restroom signs.
