= Capitol Hill Seattle Blog =

News website in Seattle, Washington, US

- Website type: News website
- Available in: English
- Founded: 2006
- Headquarters: Seattle, Washington, United States
- Editor: Justin Carder
- Website: www.capitolhillseattle.com

The Capitol Hill Seattle Blog (also known as CHS Blog) is a hyperlocal news website covering the Capitol Hill neighborhood of Seattle, United States. Established in 2006, its publisher is Justin Carder.

Its reporting has been sourced by the Seattle Times, Seattle Metropolitan, KCPQ-TV, the Puget Sound Business Journal, and others.
