= LGBTQ culture in Seattle =

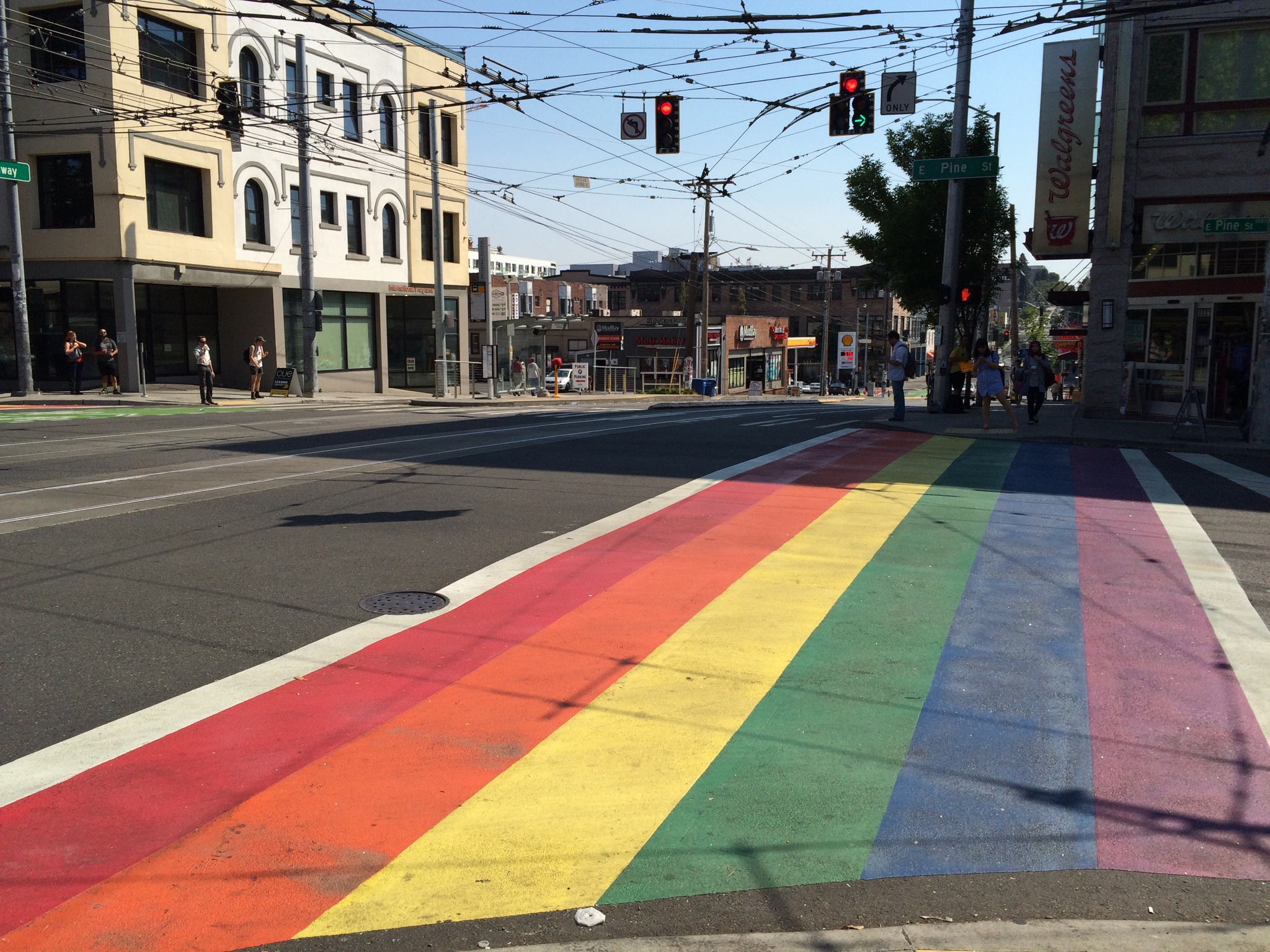
One of Seattle's rainbow crossings, 2015

Seattle has a notably large LGBTQ community, and the city of Seattle has protected gay and lesbian workers since the passage of the Fair Employment Practice Ordinance in 1973. Seattle's LGBTQ culture is celebrated at Seattle Pride, which began in 1977 as Gay Pride Week. Gay cabaret traveled in a circuit including Seattle and San Francisco since the 1930s. Seattleites have operated gay-friendly clubs and bars since the 1930s, including The Casino in Underground Seattle at Pioneer Square (which allowed same-sex dancing since 1930), and upstairs from it The Double Header bar was in continuous operation since 1933 or 1934 until 2015 (thought to be the oldest continuously-operating gay bar in the United States).

Seattle's gay shopping and recreation area is centered on Capitol Hill with rainbow-painted crosswalks, bars, bookstores and other venues.

In 2013, Seattle overtook San Francisco as the United States city with the most households composed of gay or lesbian couples (2.6%), and was the only U.S. city with more than 1% of the households being lesbian couples.

== Early history ==
Information on LGBTQ culture among the settlers of the Washington Territory (and within United States as a whole) in the 19th Century is sparse. While there are certain high-profile historical figures who are known (or were rumored) to have been LGBTQ in America and in the Washington Territory, LGBTQ Americans largely kept their sexual minority status private during this century. There were no legal same-sex unions in the United States of any kind at this time, and Washington State would not legalize same-sex unions until the 21st Century. When the Washington Territory was founded it inherited all of the Oregon Territory's laws; because the Oregon Territory did not then have a sodomy law, the Washington Territory never had a sodomy law (though it was still subject to federal sodomy laws). It would not be until 1893 that a sodomy law was put in place in Washington State, and that law was not repealed until 1976.

=== Pioneer Square venues ===
The original hub of the LGBTQ community in Seattle was the Pioneer Square neighborhood, where many of the underground spaces could covertly cater to the LGBTQ community. When the Prohibition era ended in 1933, the LGBTQ presence had grown intense enough to see dedicated social spaces arise to serve the community. Smith Tower had a gay bar in the basement called the Submarine Room. The Casino, Double Header, and Spinning Wheel also opened in the 1930s. The Garden of Allah (located in the basement of the Arlington Hotel at 1213 First Avenue) opened in 1946, becoming the first gay-owned cabaret in Seattle. These early gay bars and cabarets provided cultural and social outlets for Seattle's LGBTQ community. Same-sex dancing was popular where allowed, and drag was integral to cabaret shows at these venues. By the 1970s several gay bars and LGBTQ-friendly establishments lined Occidental Avenue.

=== Steam baths ===
Multiple steam baths in Pioneer Square – baths which predated the emergence of the LGBTQ community – later came to cater largely to gay men by the 1940s. Public baths were considered an important space for both social communion and sexual congress for gay men, so much so that some Seattle baths catered exclusively to gay men during the mid 20th Century. Baths were less prone to being raided by the police than bars were, and were seen as one of the safest community spaces available to gay men at the time. Notable steam baths included the South End Steam Baths and Atlas Steam Baths). The South End Steam Baths were located in the Terry-Denny Building (at 115 1/2 First Avenue), and used the spa facilities which were originally installed for guests of the Northern Hotel (which originally operated in the upper floors of the building). Before 1943, the South End Steam Baths were known as the Turkish Steam Baths and were operating independently of the hotel. The South End Steam Baths were in business for 50 years, from 1943 to 1993. By contrast, the Atlas Steam Baths moved multiple times during their operation: The first verified location was open between 1965 and 1968 at 118½ Occidental Avenue, and a second confirmed location at 1318 Second Avenue operated from 1969 to 1978. An earlier pre-1965 location was mentioned in one oral history, recalling an apocryphal "Atlas Club" at Prefontaine Place, but this has not been corroborated by city records. Both buildings confirmed to have housed the Atlas Steam Baths have since been demolished.

=== Police raids ===
Like in many other cities in the USA during the early and mid 20th Century, police raids constantly threatened gay bars in Seattle. Washington State passed the "Sabbath Breaking" law, a Blue Law that prevented the operation of most businesses during Sunday. The Sabbath Breaking law compounded with regulations instituted in 1933 by the then-newly-formed state Liquor Control Board (Note: The Board was created immediately after the ratification of the Twenty-first Amendment to the United States Constitution ended national alcohol prohibition in the USA.), regulations which mandated that no alcoholic beverages could be sold on Sundays, including "the requirement that already-sold drinks be picked up at midnight on Saturday night". Many businesses flouted the Sabbath Breaking law, and the nature of many bars often required police to intentionally enter and search a bar after midnight to confirm that no one was drinking. These circumstances combined to create a climate whereby "these laws were often used selectively by police to harass gay bars and to demand payoffs". In 1958, the owner of the Madison Tavern was granted a court injunction against police harassing his customers. This injunction was partly responsible for allowing women to dance together at the Madison. In spite of the aforementioned laws, police raids on LGBTQ-friendly establishments in Seattle (and particularly in the Pioneer Square neighborhood) were not as prevalent during the 1950s and 1960s by comparison to other US cities (like San Francisco and New York City), due to a widespread illegal payoff scheme with the police. The "Sabbath Breaking" law was repealed statewide by a 64% majority vote in November 1966, which was anticipated to lift the statewide prohibition on alcohol sales but ultimately did not. The Liquor Control Board weakened their Sunday sales restriction in 1967, 1970, and finally lift the prohibition completely in 1976.

== Post-Stonewall ==
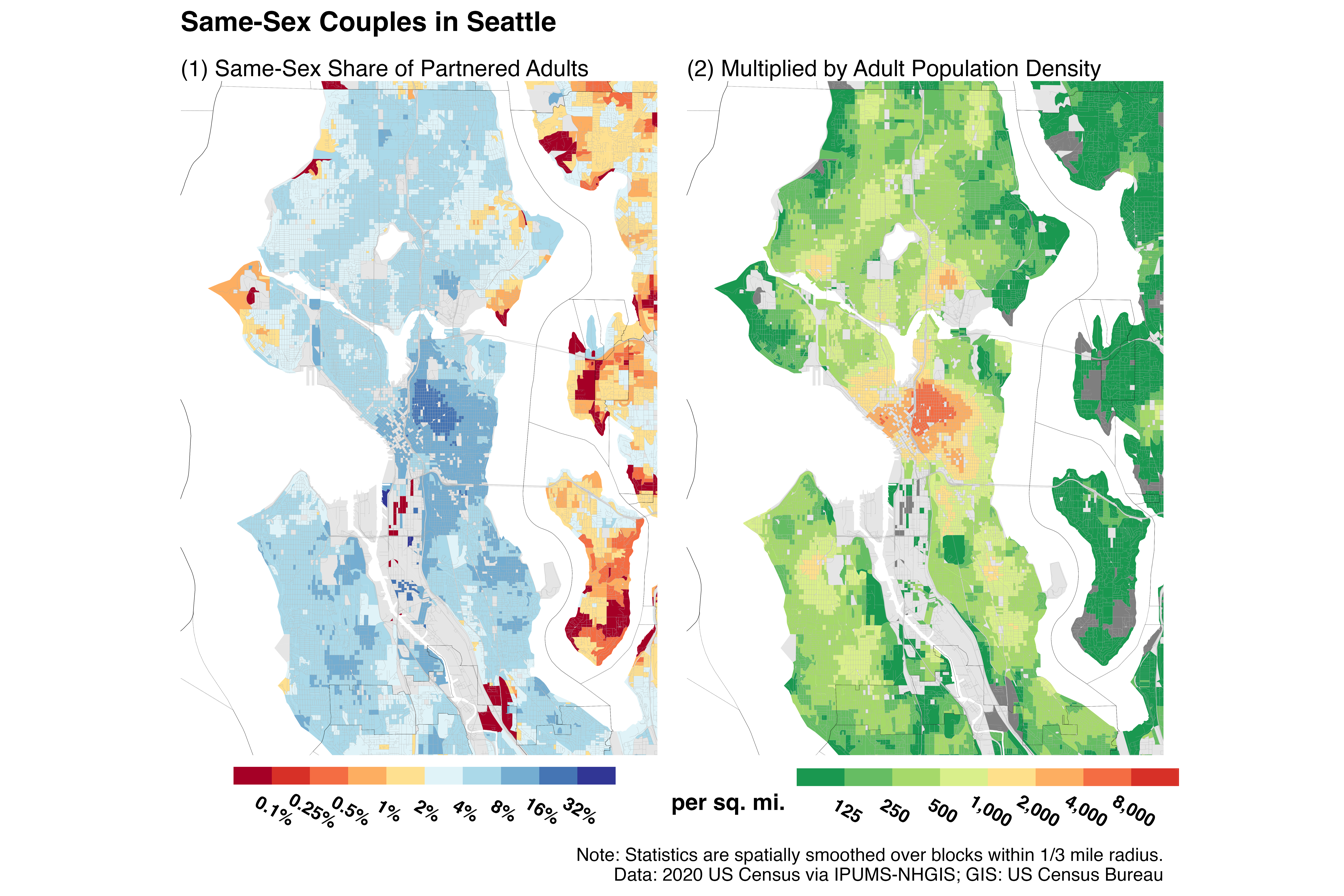
Map of same-sex couples in Seattle

The Stonewall riots motivated Seattle activists to make the LGBTQ community more publicly visible. The LGBTQ community in Seattle shifted from an covert and illegalized group to a public community campaigning openly for equal rights, aligning with national trends at the time. Gay rights activist David Neth organized Seattle's first (unrecognized by the city) Gay Pride Week in 1974, including a Pride picnic in Occidental Park and a street dance. In 1977 Seattle Mayor Wes Uhlman officially recognized the “first official Gay Pride Week.” The Seattle Pride Parade that year attracted over 2,000 attendees.

Galvanized in part by the Stonewall riots, the Gay Community Center was founded in 1971 with the goal of providing a social space that "wasn’t a bath house or a bar", located initially in the basement of the 102 Cherry Street building (presently part of the Pioneer Square underground). In its first year of operation, more than 2000 people attended the community center. The Gay Community Center closed temporarily the next year in 1972 (due to rent more than doubling), re-opened in Capitol Hill a few years later, and closed permanently in 1977.

The Lesbian Resource Center also opened in 1971 at the University of Washington YWCA at 4224 University Way N.E., initially named the "Gay Women's Resource Center". The UW YWCA was already known at this time for providing feminist programming and services for women in the Seattle area (not just students), including programming and services which were considered radical or controversial at the time. The UW YWCA began hosting several other feminist organizations during the 1970s, including: the Abortion Birth Control Referral Service (during or after 1970), the Women's Divorce Cooperative (starting in 1971), the Aradia Clinic (starting in 1972), Mechanica (starting in 1972) and Women in Trades (starting in 1976), Rape Relief (starting in 1972), Serve Our Sisters (starting in 1972), Women in Midstream (starting in 1972), and the Third World Women's Resource Center (starting in 1973). The Lesbian Resource Center was a "peer counseling center" which provided counseling, maintained a lending library, hosted discussion groups, and brought in speakers on relevant topics. The Lesbian Resource Center became independent from the UW YWCA in 1980 (in conjunction with the UW YWCA's eviction), becoming the non-profit organization Pacific Women's Resources, while still maintaining the Lesbian Resource Center name. Pacific Women's Resources was still active as of 2005.

During the 1970s, the cost of living in the Pioneer Square neighborhood rose as rent prices noticeably increased, pushing the LGBTQ community northward and across the I-5 highway into the Capitol Hill neighborhood. Capitol Hill remains a stronghold of the LGBTQ community to this day, while many of the venues that catered to LGBTQ clientele in Pioneer Square went out of business during the 1970s.

== Events ==
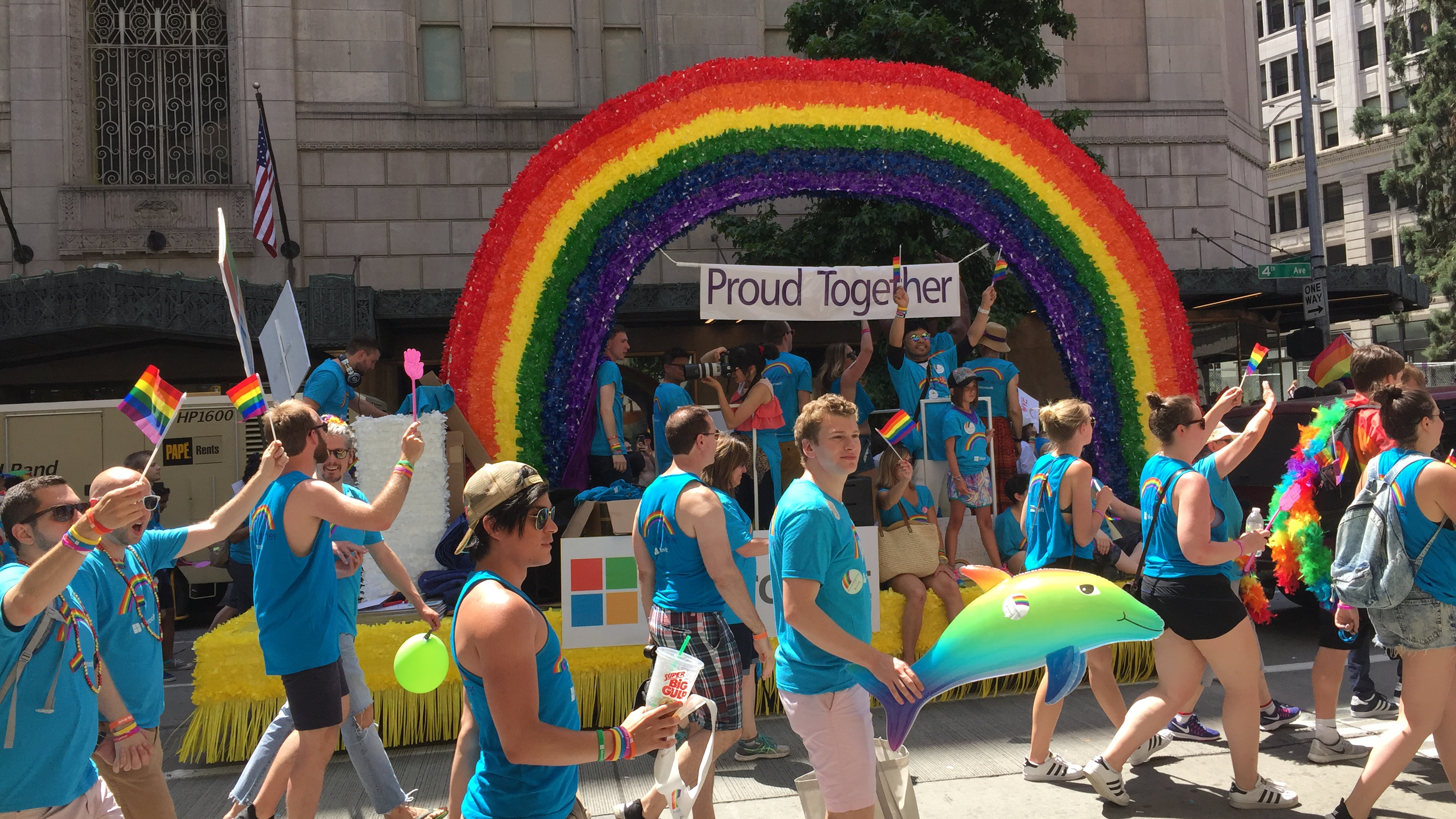
Seattle Pride, 2017

Seattle is home to multiple pride events. Seattle Pride is the longest-running pride event in Seattle. The Pride ASIA festival "draw[s] attention to the vibrant cultures that make up Seattle’s queer Asian American and Pacific Islander communities." The city also hosts Trans Pride Seattle.

Other notable LGBTQ events in Seattle include the Seattle Queer Film Festival (formerly known as the Seattle Lesbian & Gay Film Festival). Gays Eating Garlic Bread in the Park started in Seattle and has spread to other U.S. cities.

== Media ==
Seattle Gay News is the third-oldest LGBTQ newspaper in the United States, first published in Seattle in 1974. Waxie Moon is a documentary set largely in Seattle about the performer of the same name.

== Organizations ==
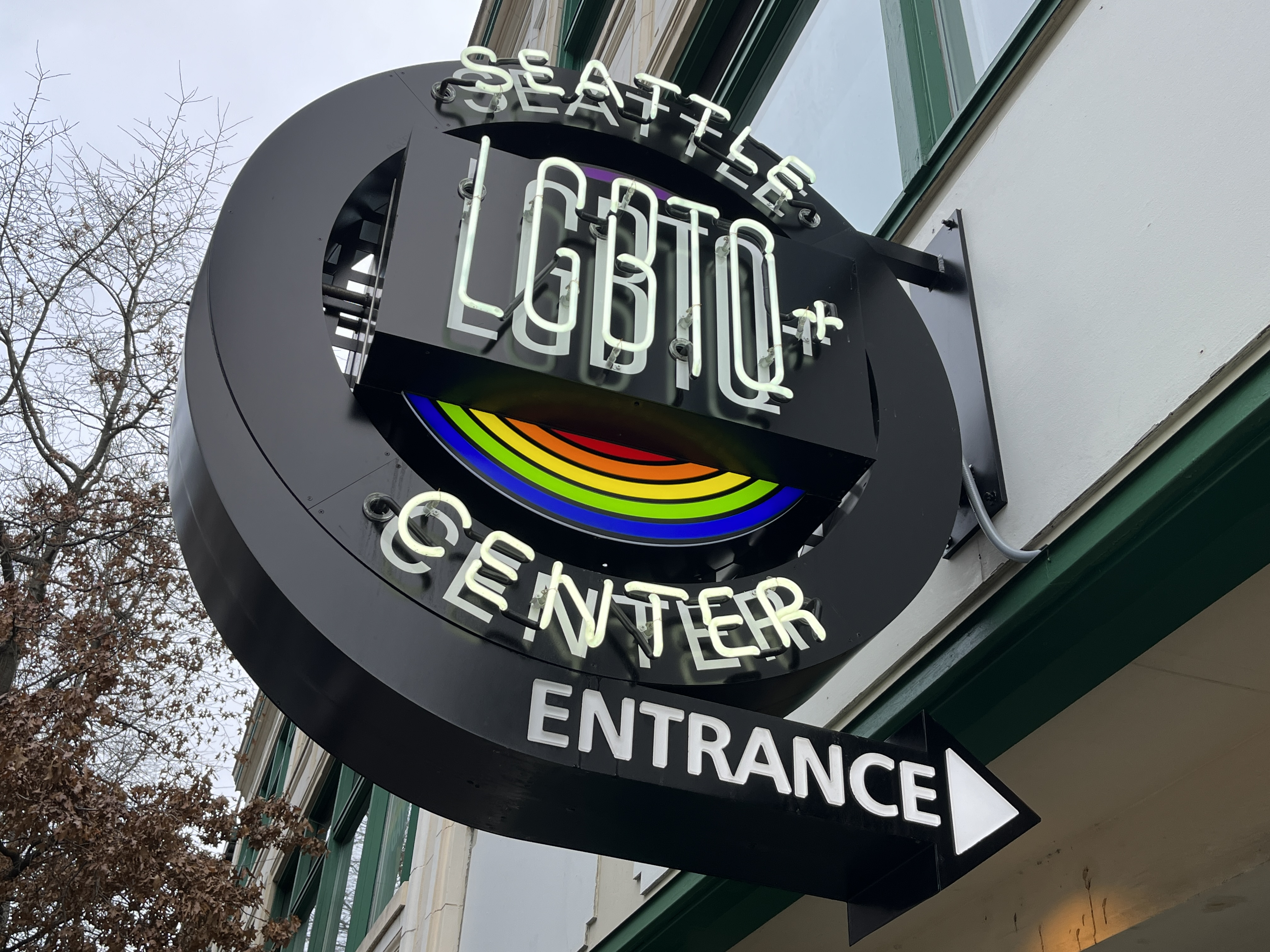
Signs for Seattle's LGBTQ+ Center, 2022

Notable LGBTQ organizations in Seattle include: the Equal Rights Washington, Gay City Health Project, the Gender Justice League, Pride Foundation, the Lambert House LGBTQ youth center, and the Ingersoll Gender Center.

The Seattle Women's Chorus and Seattle Men's Chorus together are among the largest community choral organizations in North America, and are among the largest LGBTQ-identified choruses in the world, performing for an annual audience of more than 30,000 patrons across the Puget Sound.

The Northwest Network founded by lesbians in 1987 to support survivors of abuse and foster empowerment in the LGBTQ community.

Pride Place is a housing and social service development aimed at LGBTQ senior care. It hosts the facilities of GenPride, a nonprofit organization serving the senior LGBTQ community in the greater Seattle metro area.

Queer the Land is a cooperative housing organization that started in 2016 in Beacon Hill, which provides housing for LGBTQ local residents. Queer the Land also provides disaster-preparedness resources for the communities they serve.

== People ==
Notable drag performers from Seattle include Arrietty, BenDeLaCreme, Bosco, Irene Dubois, James Majesty, Jinkx Monsoon, Monikkie Shame, and Robbie Turner.

== Policy ==
Two wellness centers housed within Seattle Public Schools provide gender affirming care. All centers follow legal state guidelines. Gender affirming care is one of many services students can receive through these health centers.

== Places ==
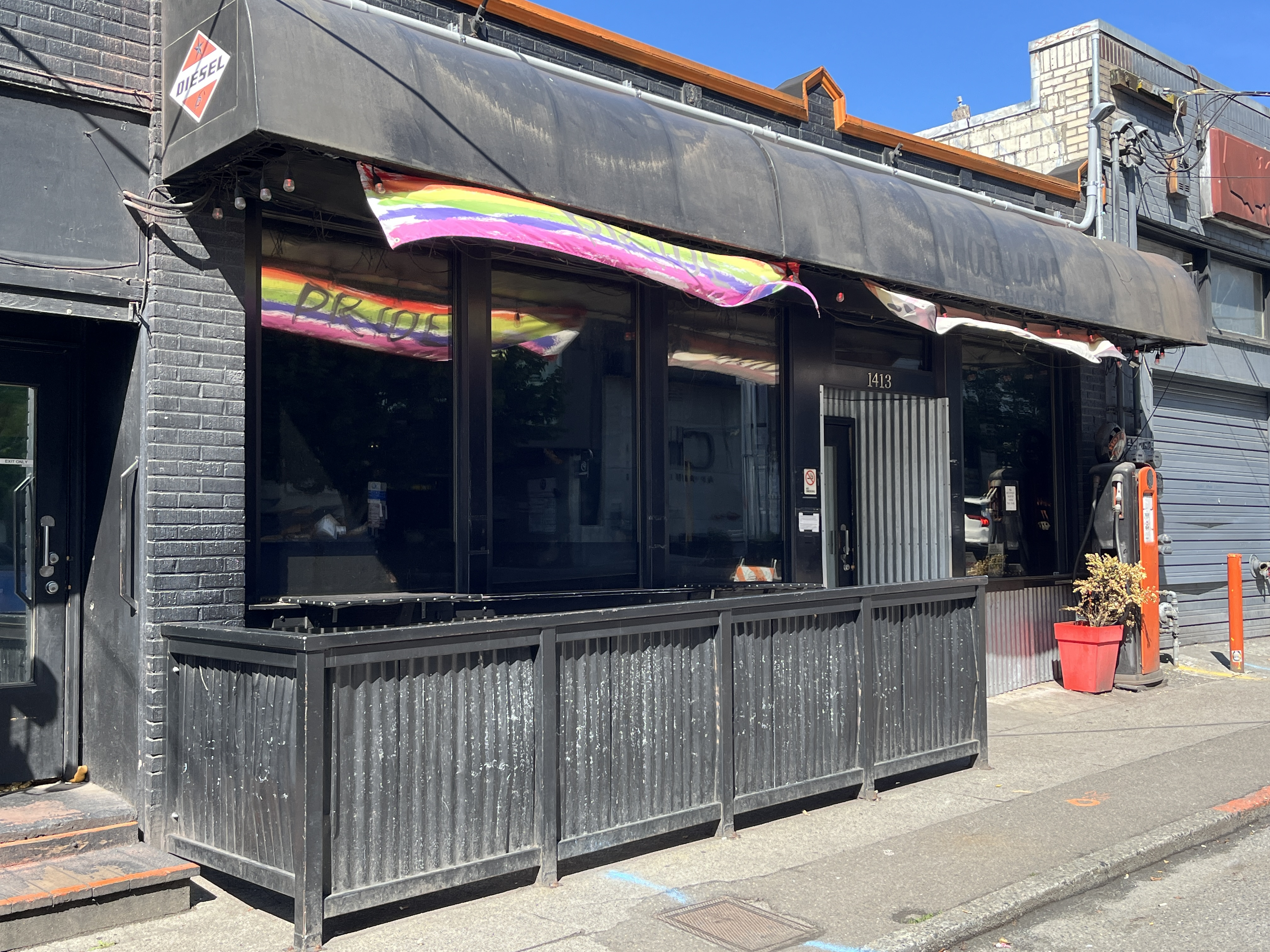
The gay bar Diesel, 2024

=== Current ===
- CC's Seattle
- Cuff Complex
- Diesel
- Howell Park
- Denny Blaine Park
- Madison Pub
- Neighbours Nightclub
- Pony
- Pride Place
- Queer Bar
- Seattle Eagle
- Unicorn
- Union
- The Wildrose

=== Defunct ===
- The Comeback Seattle
- The Double Header
- Garden of Allah
- Manray
- Purr Cocktail Lounge
- R Place
- Shelly's Leg

== See also ==
- Lumber Yard Bar, an LGBTQ establishment in White Center, Washington

== Sources ==
- Schielke, Aaron (2015), Not For Tourists Guide to Seattle 2016, Skyhorse Publishing, ISBN 9781510700253
- Haggerty, George (2013), Encyclopedia of Gay Histories and Cultures, Routledge, p. 158, ISBN 9781135585068
- Gay Market Guide, Hyperion, 2005, p. 62, ISBN 9780974895734
- Sainsbury, Brendan; Brash, Celeste (2014), Lonely Planet Seattle, Lonely Planet, ISBN 9781743218273
- Nova Wellness Center
