= The Wildrose (bar) =

Lesbian bar in Seattle, Washington, U.S.

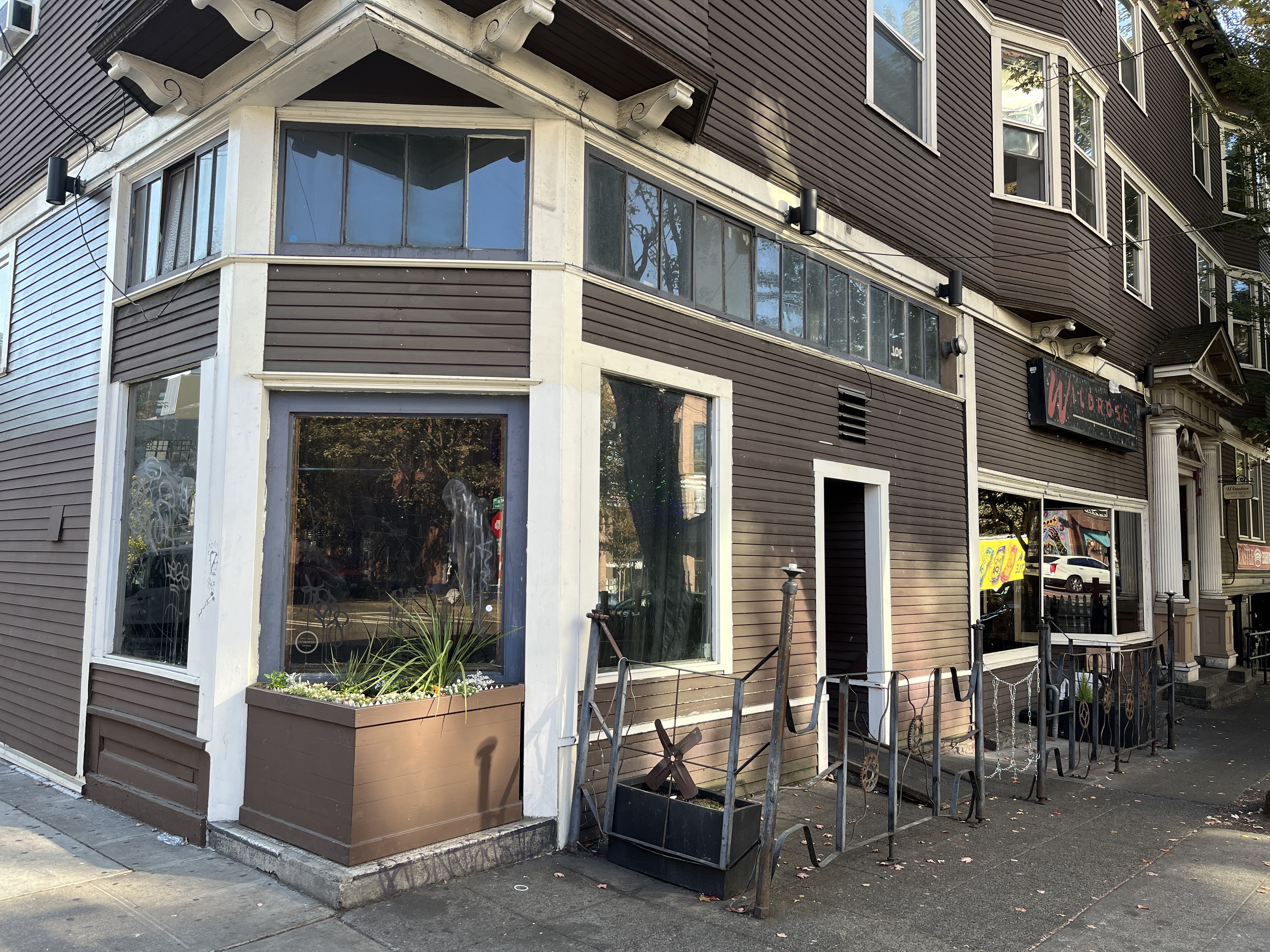
- The bar's exterior, 2022
- Interactive map of The Wildrose
- Address: 1021 East Pike Street; Seattle, Washington; United States
- Coordinates: 47.61400745029172°N 122.31833940492243°W

Construction
- Opened: 1984; 42 years ago

Website
- www.thewildrosebar.com

The Wildrose is a lesbian bar in Seattle, Washington, United States. It is located in the Capitol Hill neighborhood, and opened in 1985. It is the city's only lesbian bar. Business partners Shelley Brothers and Martha Manning, the current owners of The Wildrose, took over from the original founders in the early 2000s.

== Description ==
The LGBTQ-owned bar is located at the corner of East Pike Street and 11th Avenue in Seattle's Capitol Hill neighborhood. It resides on the bottom floor of a mixed-use apartment building constructed in 1905 and designed by architects Carl Breitung and Theobald Buchinger. The building was originally known as Lorraine Court. Today, it is known as the Winston Building.

== History ==
Seattle's first lesbian bars opened in the 1950s in Pioneer Square and Downtown. At the time, Pioneer Square was the center of Seattle's LGBTQ social scene. The Hub opened first in 1950, and the Grand Union, Sappho's Tavern, Madison Tavern and the Silver Slipper followed. Previously, lesbians gathered at queer bars like The Casino and The Garden of Allah. Bryher Herak, one of Wildrose's founders, believed that bars like these were an essential early and accepting gathering space for the lesbian community.

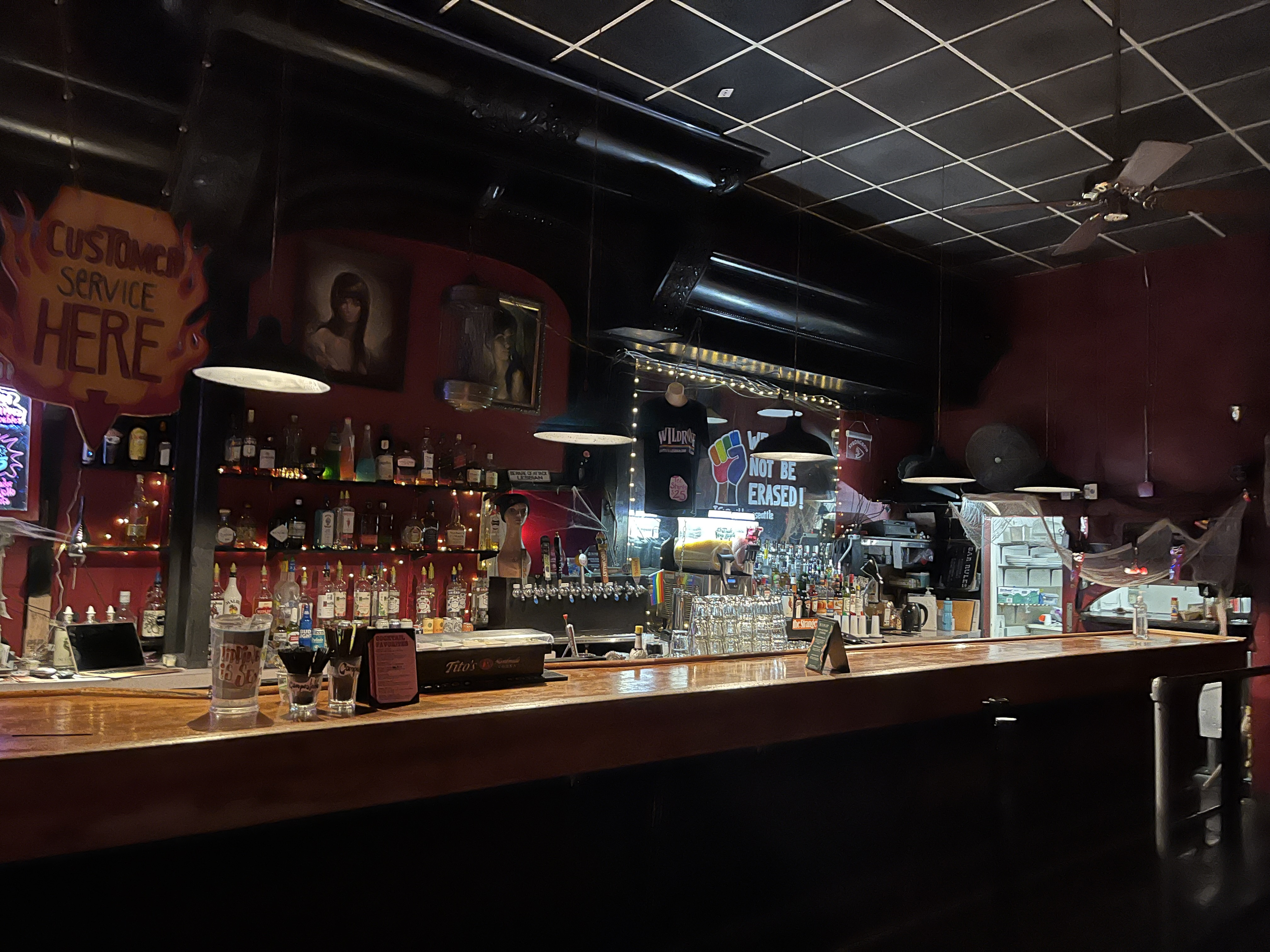
The bar's interior, 2022

In the early 1980s, a collective of five women decided to open a lesbian bar that was "light, served good food, and was a place where women would feel comfortable bringing friends and family, straight and gay." Herak described it as a "women's place", and not a place only for women.

After scouting locations for the bar, the group decided on 1021 E Pine Street, the location of a former sports bar. The founders liked the location because it had big, street-facing windows. During a time when most LGBT spaces were hidden, accessed through secret entrances, and advertised by word-of-mouth, these features of light and visibility were important to the founders. Additionally, the bar's location in Capitol Hill meant it was in Seattle's current gayborhood.

Herak chose the name Wildrose for the bar in honor of her favorite Montana wildflowers. It also served as a symbol of her lesbian community, both their strength while fighting for visibility in Seattle, and their "orneriness".

=== Opening ===
The Wildrose opened on New Years Eve, 1985 with a line around the block.

"From the start, the Wild Rose [sic] drew a diverse crowd. Tradeswomen, professional women, artists, leather women, musicians, radical and not-so-radical political organizations made it their home. The Wild Rose [sic] became a gathering space for the lesbian community and a focus of community organizing."

The bar combined the functions of a coffeehouse and tavern, popular at lunch and night, hosting women's bands and concerts, sharing pool tables, and serving drinks. It became the most popular lesbian bar in Seattle.

=== Ownership changes ===
Despite its early successes, the business could not support all five of the original founders, and soon, Herak, the remaining founder, was running the bar on her own. Herak sold the business to Joann Panayiotou, who eventually sold it to Karin Finn, Martha Manning, Janice Oakley.

In early 2020, owners Brothers and Manning started a GoFundMe campaign to raise money to help keep their doors open during the COVID-19 pandemic. In 2022, the Wildrose retired its long-running taco Tuesday offering and introduced a new chef, who brought a new menu that includes traditional bar bites like cheese and meat trays, nuts and olives, and sloppy joes. The Wildrose owners made these changes because they wanted the bar to "have more reasons for people to stay, offer more things for people, and be more well rounded."

As of 2023, Martha Manning and Shelley Brothers own the bar. When they took over in the early 2000s after working at the bar for years, one of the first things they did was to take out the jukebox. They were tired of patrons putting on cliche lesbian music like Indigo Girls, Melissa Etheridge, and ABBA "17 times a night."

In February 2025, Shelley Brothers died due to complications from cancer.
