= Jorie =

Jorie is a given name. Notable people with the given name include:

- Jorie Lueloff Friedman (1940–2026), American journalist
- Jorie Graham (born 1950), American poet
- Jorie Remus (1919–1998), American comedian and actress
