= The Comeback Seattle =

Defunct bar and nightclub in Seattle, Washington, U.S.

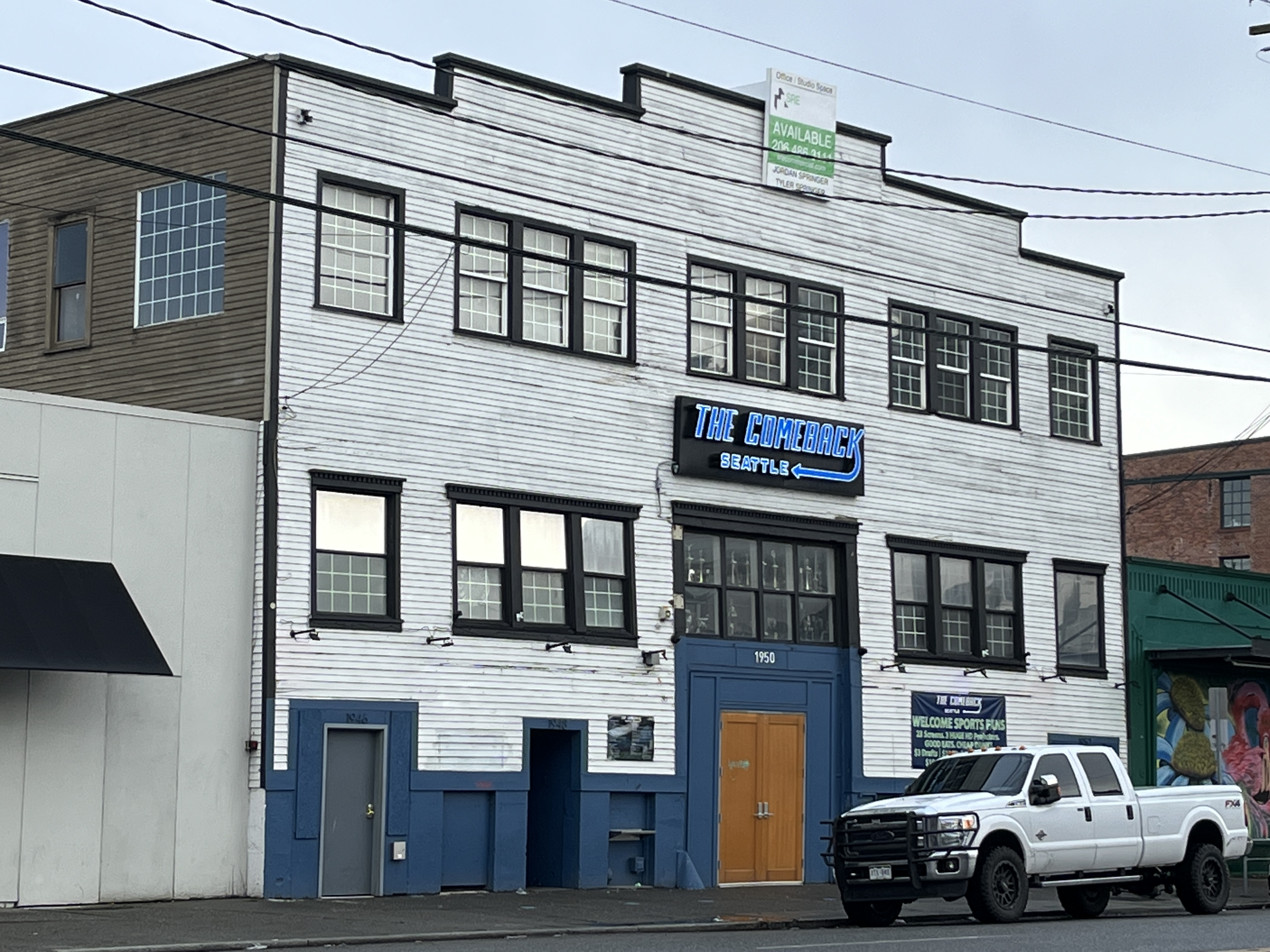
- The venue's exterior in January 2023
- Interactive map of The Comeback Seattle
- Address: 1950 1st Avenue S Seattle, Washington; United States
- Coordinates: 47.5845°N 122.3340°W
- Owner: Floyd Lovelady; John Fish

Construction
- Opened: 2022
- Closed: April 30, 2023

The Comeback Seattle was an LGBTQ-friendly bar and nightclub in Seattle's SoDo neighborhood, in the U.S. state of Washington. Described as a gay bar and queer sports bar, The Comeback hosted drag shows and RuPaul's Drag Race viewing parties. The short-lived bar opened in early 2022 and closed on April 30, 2023. It was co-owned by Floyd Lovelady, a former general manager of the gay bar and nightclub R Place, as well as John Fish.

== Description ==
The Comeback Seattle was a bar and nightclub on 1st Avenue in Seattle's SoDo neighborhood that catered to the LGBTQ community. Writers for The Stranger described The Comeback as a gay bar, a queer sports bar, and a "gay-sports-dance bar ... that evolved out of" the gay bar R Place, which had operated on Capitol Hill. The Comeback had go-go dancers, weekend dance parties, and a weekly drag show called "Lashes", featuring local and touring performers. A taco truck often operated outside.

The space was approximately 9,000 square feet and had a seating capacity of 150 to 200 people. The building consisted of modular walls, a game area to play darts and pool, and gender-neutral restrooms. The Stranger's Renee Raketty noted the large open space with an "impressive stage and long bar". She said the venue was ADA-compliant, "with all the public areas on the same floor", and said the space had a large prep kitchen, a walk-in refrigerator, an office, and other private areas.

== History ==
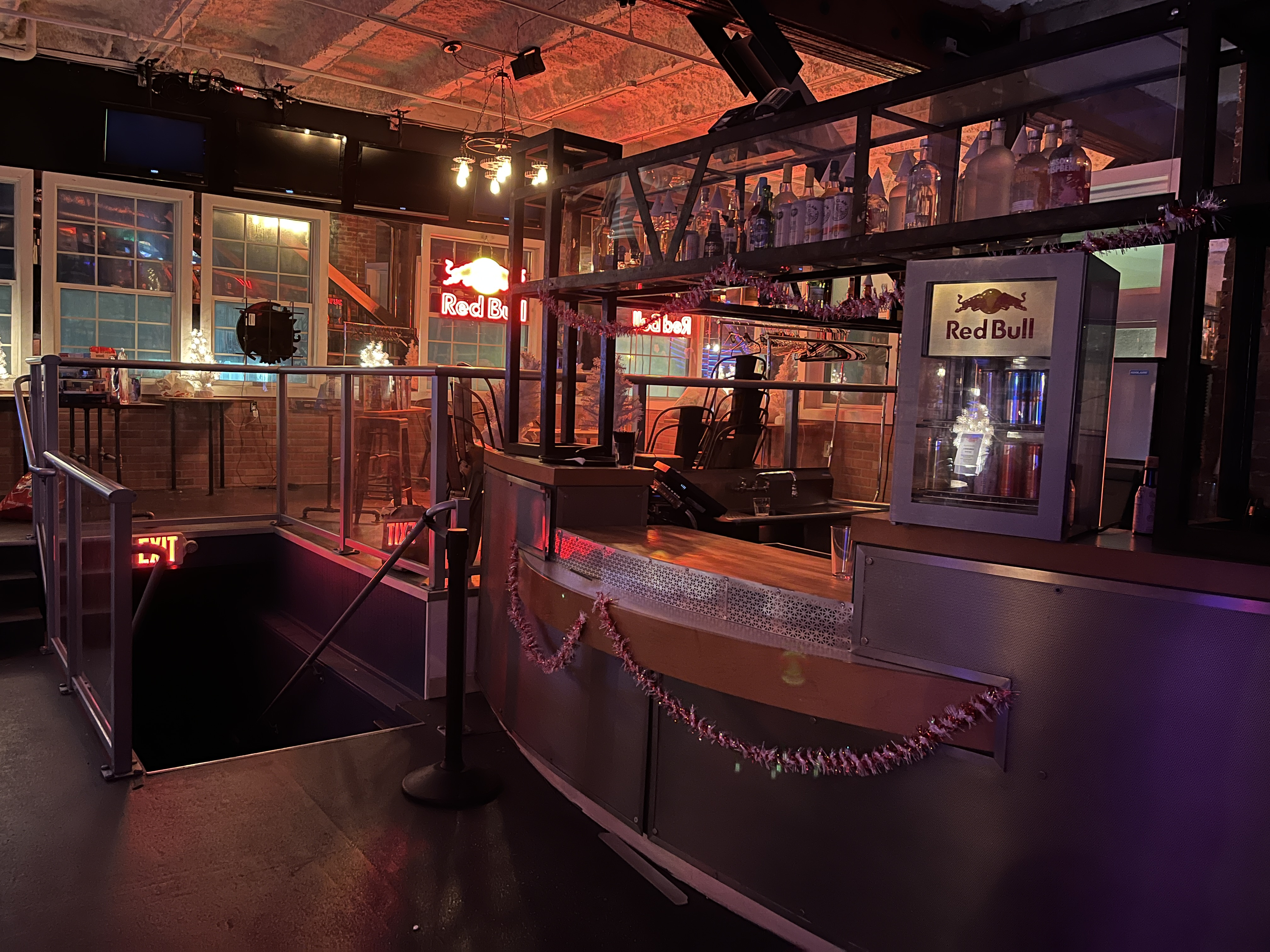
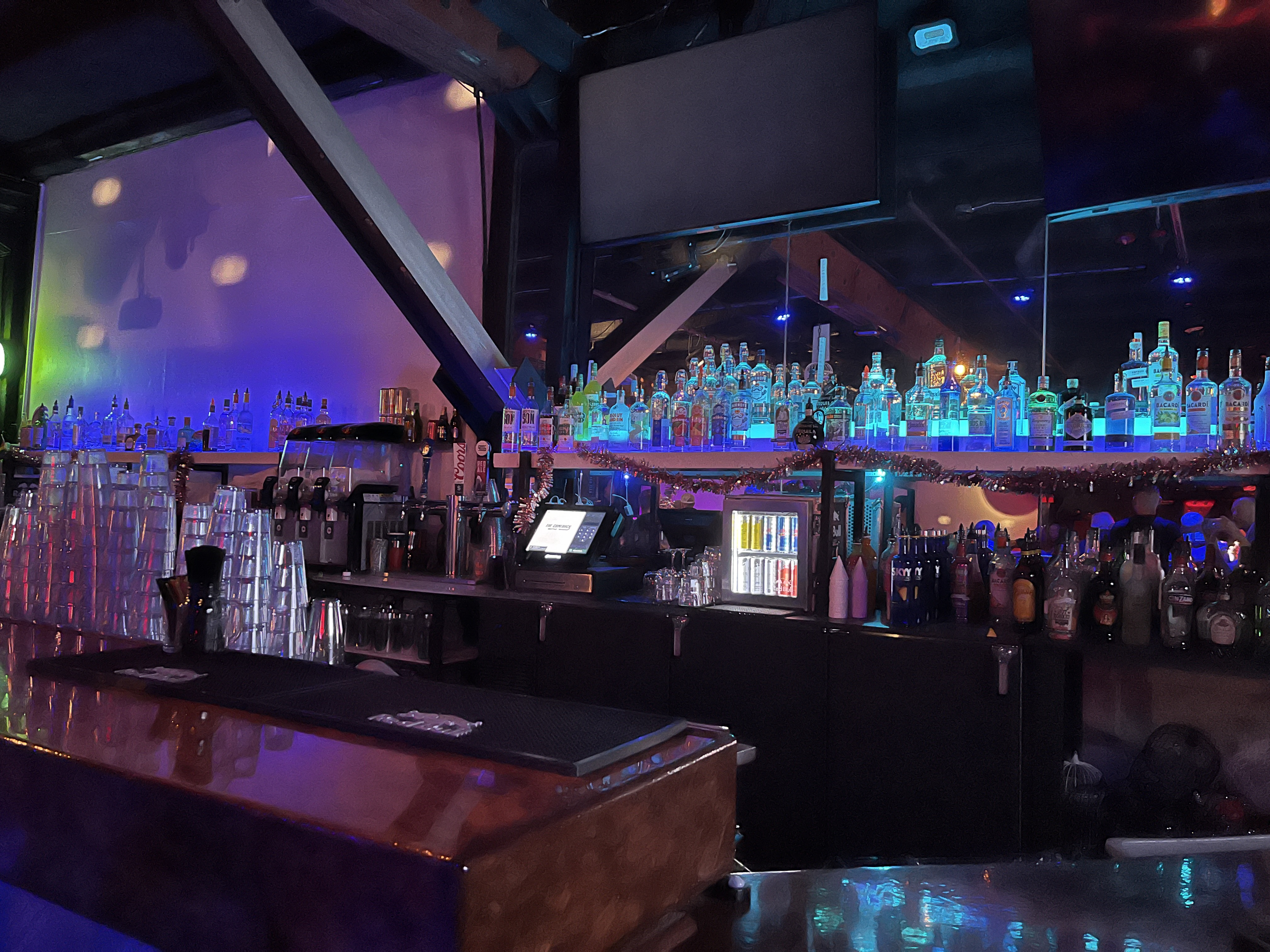
The bar's interior, 2022

Co-owners Floyd Lovelady and John Fish opened The Comeback in early 2022, in a building which had housed the bar, event rental space, and nightclub Eden Seattle. Previously, Lovelady was the general manager of the gay bar R Place. In 2021, Matt Baume of The Stranger said that with Lovelady managing The Comeback, he felt as if it was R Place's "spiritual successor". According to Lovelady, The Comeback was meant to match the spirit and mood of R Place by bringing back old activities.

The Comeback was Lovelady's first bar to own. Following R Place's closure, he and Fish (a former patron) formed The Comeback Seattle LLC, acquired R Place's social media accounts, and became co-managing partners of The Comeback. The SoDo location, approximately twice as large as R Place, was proposed by the SoDo Business Improvement Association; Lovelady found SoDo appealing because of its relatively lower cost, central location, nearby parking availability, and limited noise restrictions. R Place's head security host was hired to work at The Comeback.

The Comeback's redesign was led by Andrew "Ace" Grant Houston of House Cosmopolitan. Houston told Seattle Gay News that he was proud of his work, as the bar "represents the continuation of local Capitol Hill history in spirit". The bar raised funds for the renovation via Indiegogo.

In November 2021, Eater Seattle said The Comeback was planning to open in December. In December, the business was hiring bar-backs, bartenders, hosts, servers, and other positions, and aimed to host a grand opening on February 11. In January 2022, The Comeback held a soft launch and moved the grand opening to mid-February due to supply chain issues. Silky Nutmeg Ganache headlined "Lashes" in February. Other events the bar hosted in 2022 included a ten-week drag competition called "So You Think You Can Drag", an after party for a bar crawl held in conjunction with Pride Month, and RuPaul's Drag Race viewing parties.

The Comeback closed on April 30, 2023. According to a social media post, the bar closed as a decision to "step aside" and let others influence the Seattle's LGBTQ community and scene. The Comeback had a "blowout" liquor sale, and the "Lashes" series was moved to Unicorn. In April 2025, The Seattle Times reported, "Following the closure, local businesses and police say illegally operating nightclubs continued to operate at that building and others in the area, leading to violence and nuisance behaviors. In August, while the First Avenue South building was listed for sale, a 22-year-old man was shot and killed at a party inside." The building is slated to become a sobering center.
