= Diesel (gay bar) =

Gay bar in Seattle, Washington, U.S.

- Logo

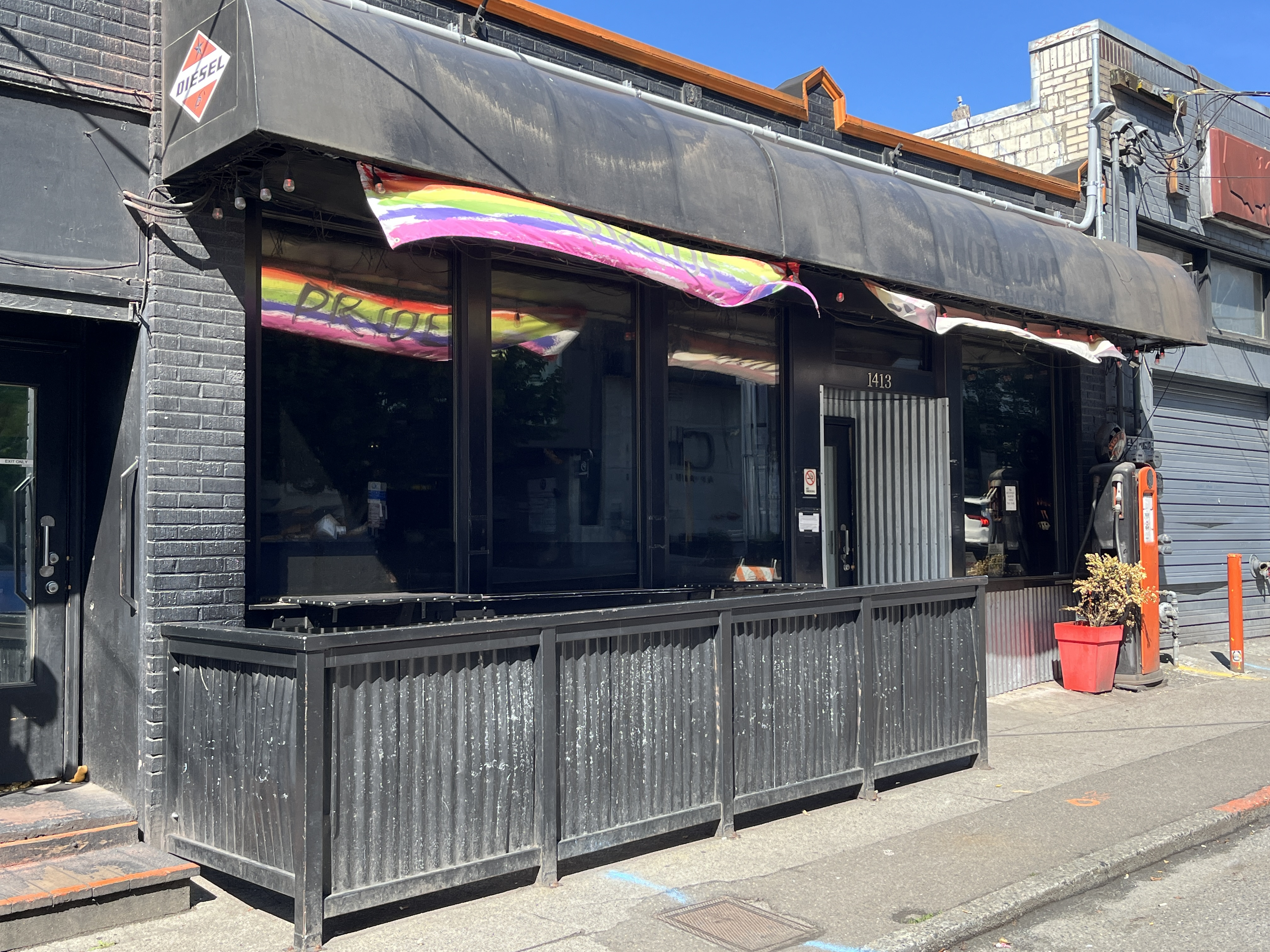
- Interactive map of Diesel
- Address: Seattle, Washington; United States
- Coordinates: 47.6133°N 122.3143°W

Diesel (sometimes Diesel Seattle) is a gay bar in Seattle, in the U.S. state of Washington.

== History ==
The LGBT-owned bar opened in 2011, catering to the bear community. Mike Reis is a co-owner.

In 2011, Reis was denied service by the printing company Access Printed Media for promoting homosexuality, which the American Civil Liberties Union said violated state law.

== Reception ==
Bryan van Gorder ranked Diesel number 26 on NewNowNext.com's 2018 list of nation's 50 most popular gay bars. Kevin Phinney included Diesel in Metrosource's 2019 list of Seattle's best gay bars. He said:

While the Cuff may be your introduction to Seattle's bear, leather and daddy scene, Diesel provides graduate work in bear culture. The men are bearded, burly and many look like they've done time as lumberjacks. This is about as relaxed as the bar scene gets in Seattle, as there's a noticeable lack of pretension in the air. Say hello to any of the bartenders and watch how quickly they smile back. The patrons follow suit.

Robin Gray included Diesel in Bear World magazine's 2019 list of the world's best bear bars. Emma Banks included Diesel in Thrillist's 2021 list of Seattle's best LGBTQ bars, writing: "Diesel claims to be 'fueling Seattle's bear scene,' and while we can't confirm whether or not that's true, it's certainly worth a visit to find out. Here, the booze (and beards) flow, and you're bound to have a good time if you fall into the following categories: 'Bears, bikers, buddies, bubbas, blue collars, and bad asses' (aren't we all?)."

== See also ==
- List of LGBTQ bars
