= CC's Seattle =

Gay bar in Seattle, Washington, U.S.

- CC's
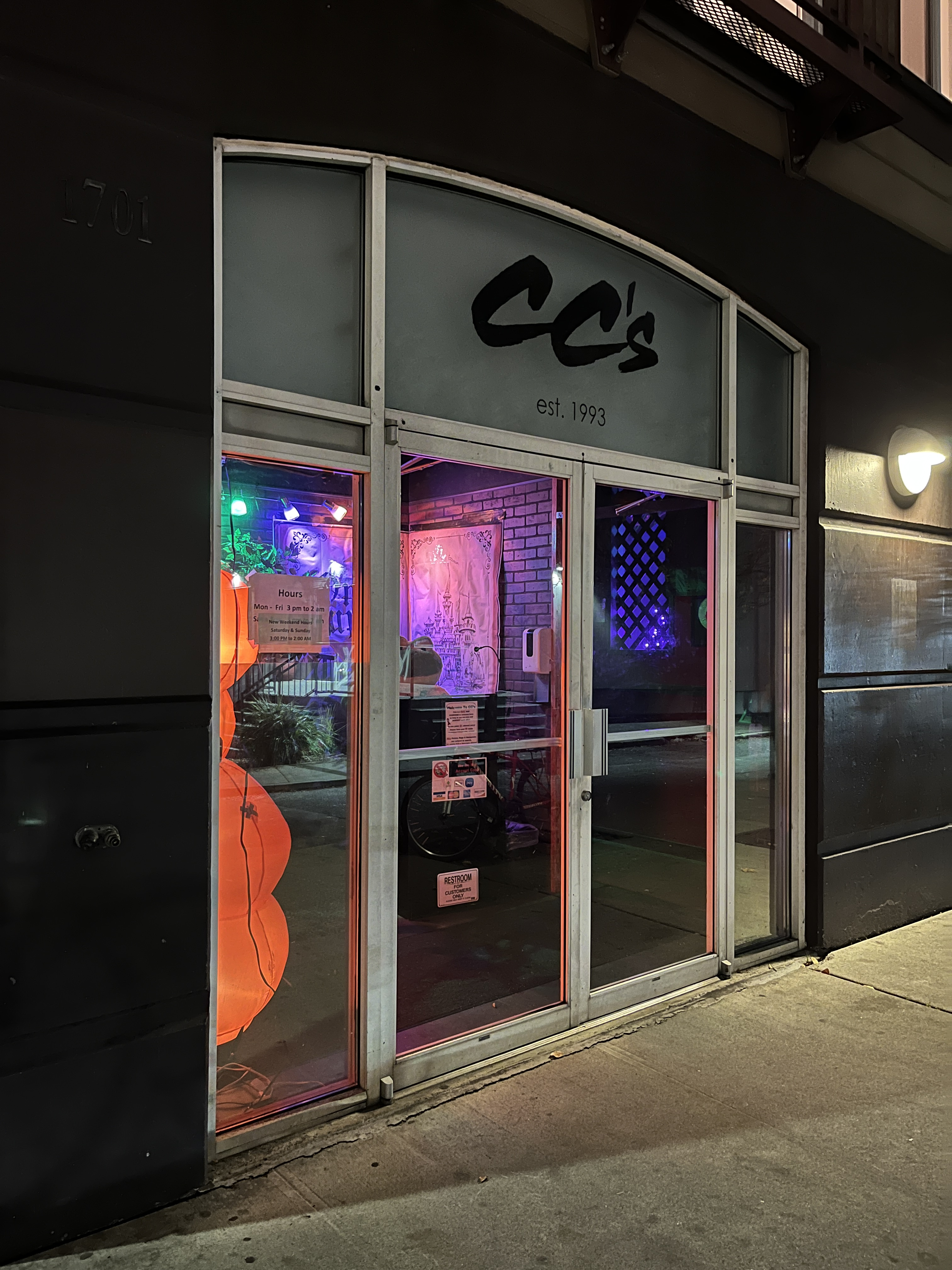
- The bar's exterior at night, 2022

- Location in Washington
- Former names: CC Attle's
- Address: 1407 E Olive Way
- Location: Seattle, Washington, United States
- Coordinates: 47°37′10.9″N 122°19′24″W
- Owner: Chris Daw
- Type: Gay bar

Website
- ccsseattle.com

CC's Seattle (formerly CC Attle's and sometimes simply CC's) is a gay bar in Seattle's Capitol Hill neighborhood, in the U.S. state of Washington.

== Description and history ==
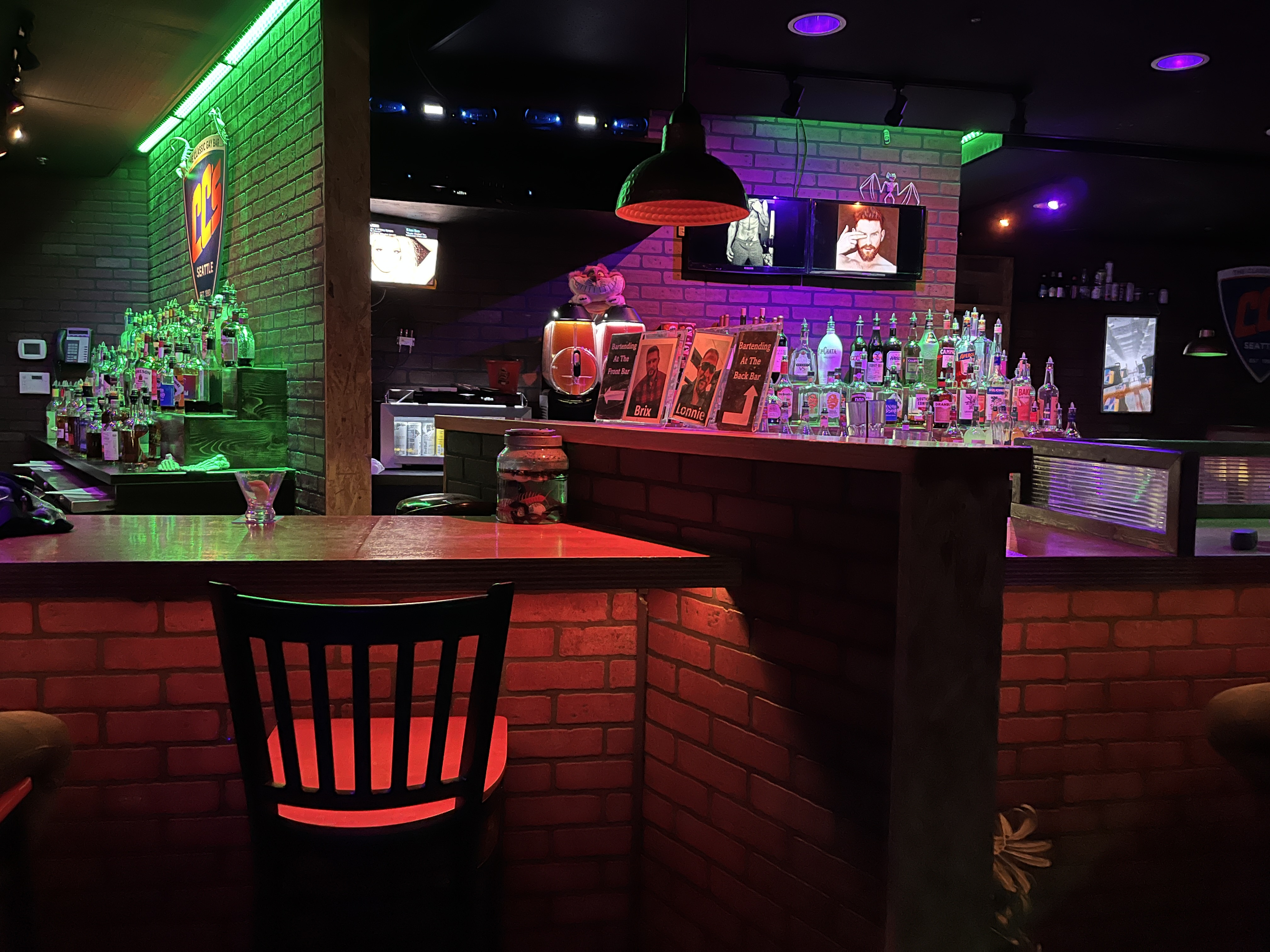
The bar's interior, 2022

CC's Seattle is a popular gay bar on East Olive Way in Seattle's Capitol Hill neighborhood. CC's Seattle was located at 1501 East Madison Street until its closure on September 30, 2010, before reopening at its current location on June 4, 2011. CC's Seattle was originally under the management of Scott Reichert until his death in October 2009. The bar is currently owned by Chris Daw.

Joshua McNichols of KUOW has said CC's is known for "stiff drinks and leather nights". Lonely Planet says, "LGBTIQ+ travelers who prefer catching up over a plate of nachos to blasting EDM will want to post up at this congenial pub. It's known as a bar for bears (slang for stockier, hairier gay men) and their admirers, but anyone looking for a laid-back time will feel welcome. You can also expect friendly bartenders who make strong drinks. Best of all: no cover ever [sic]."

Moon Seattle says, "It's a chill scene at C.C. Attle's, a bear bar with pool tables and more sunlight than many other drinking holes on Capitol Hill. The smoking corner outside is very social, and during Pride the crowd spills out into the streets. The rest of the time it's quiet enough for conversation, and there's never a cover."

== Reception ==
Emma Banks included CC's in Thrillist's 2021 list of "The Best LGBTQ Bars in Seattle", writing: "Strong drinks, good food, and frequent open mic nights characterize C C Attle's, a longstanding hangout for Seattle's gay community. Here, proof of vaccination is strictly enforced, and the vibe is decidedly chill, so don't expect a rager. Rather, this is the spot to sit back, relax, and take a load off."
