= Lumber Yard Bar =

Gay bar in White Center, Washington, U.S.

- Logo

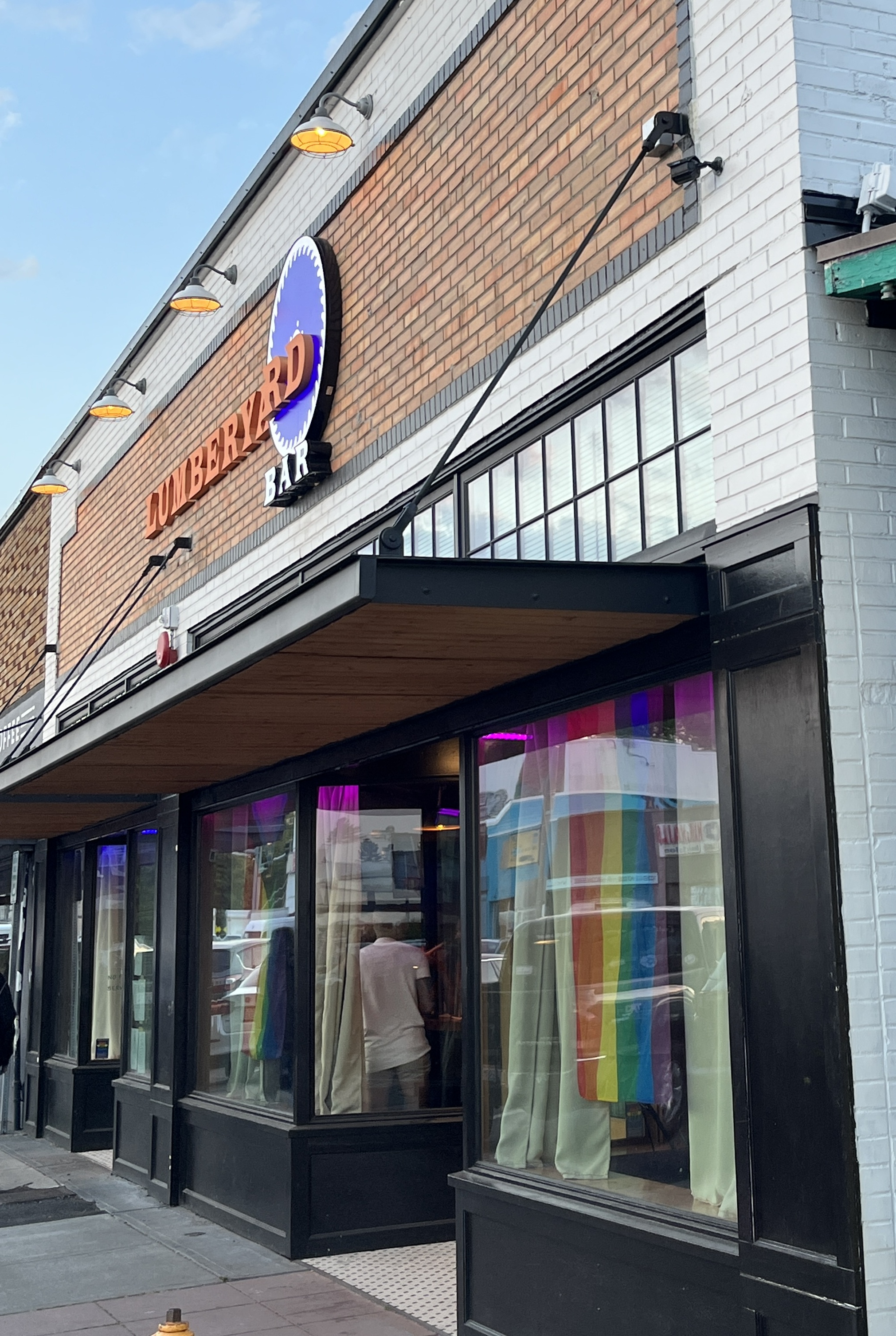
- The bar's exterior, 2023
- Interactive map of Lumber Yard Bar
- Address: 9630 16th Ave SW; White Center, Washington; United States
- Coordinates: 47°30′59.5″N 122°21′17.5″W
- Owner: Nathan Adams; Michale Farrar
- Type: Gay bar

Construction
- Opened: January 2018; 8 years ago

Lumber Yard Bar is a gay bar in White Center, in the U.S. state of Washington. Nathan Adams and Michale Farrar opened the bar in 2018. The business relocated in 2021, the result of arson.

== Description ==
The lumberjack-themed, queer-friendly Lumber Yard Bar operates along 16th Avenue Southwest in White Center. The interior has sanded wood and a skylight with planted succulents.

In 2018, Christopher Frizzelle of The Stranger wrote: "Logs are omnipresent: logs wrapped around the cords of Edison bulbs, logs chained to walls, log benches, log stools, log pictures, etc. The menu includes 'wood pellets' (olives in cheese breading served with marinara) and a mashed potato bar."

== History ==
The LGBTQ-owned bar opened in January 2018. It claims to be, and has been described as, White Center's first gay bar. Owned by Nathan Adams and Michale Farrar, Lumber Yard has hosted drag shows, show tune sing-alongs, and viewing parties for television shows such as RuPaul's Drag Race All Stars. As of 2023, Lumber Yard hosted lesbian karaoke as well as 'tacos and trivia' weekly, and has a monthly event dedicated to kink.

A fire in July 2021, later classified as arson, forced the business to close and relocate. The owners called the incident a hate crime. A GoFundMe fundraising campaign led by White Center Pride was successful in raising $100,000 for Lumber Yard. In 2022, the bar hosted an Mpox vaccine clinic in collaboration with local public health officials.

In January 2024, Lumber Yard was one of several bars raided by the Joint Enforcement Team (JET), a coalition of Seattle Police, Fire, and the Washington State Liquor and Cannabis Board (WSLCB), among other groups. The raid prompted a backlash and a policy review.

== Reception ==
Esquire included Lumber Yard in a 2022 list of the 32 best gay bars in the United States and said, "Comfortable and fun for leather daddies, trans women, bears and cubs, and lipstick lesbians alike, Lumberyard is a throwback to an earlier era, but in the best possible way. The original was burned down in an anti-gay hate-crime a few years back, but the revival has just opened across the street and is bigger and better, with a new performance space." Christopher Frizzelle included Lumber Yard in The Stranger's 2018 and 2023 overviews of Seattle's best LGBT establishments. In a 2023 overview of the metropolitan area's queer establishments, Seattle Gay News said Adams and Farrar "[offer] an experience that calls back to the pair's love for hosting".

== See also ==
- LGBTQ culture in Seattle
