= Storme Webber =

American two-spirit interdisciplinary artist

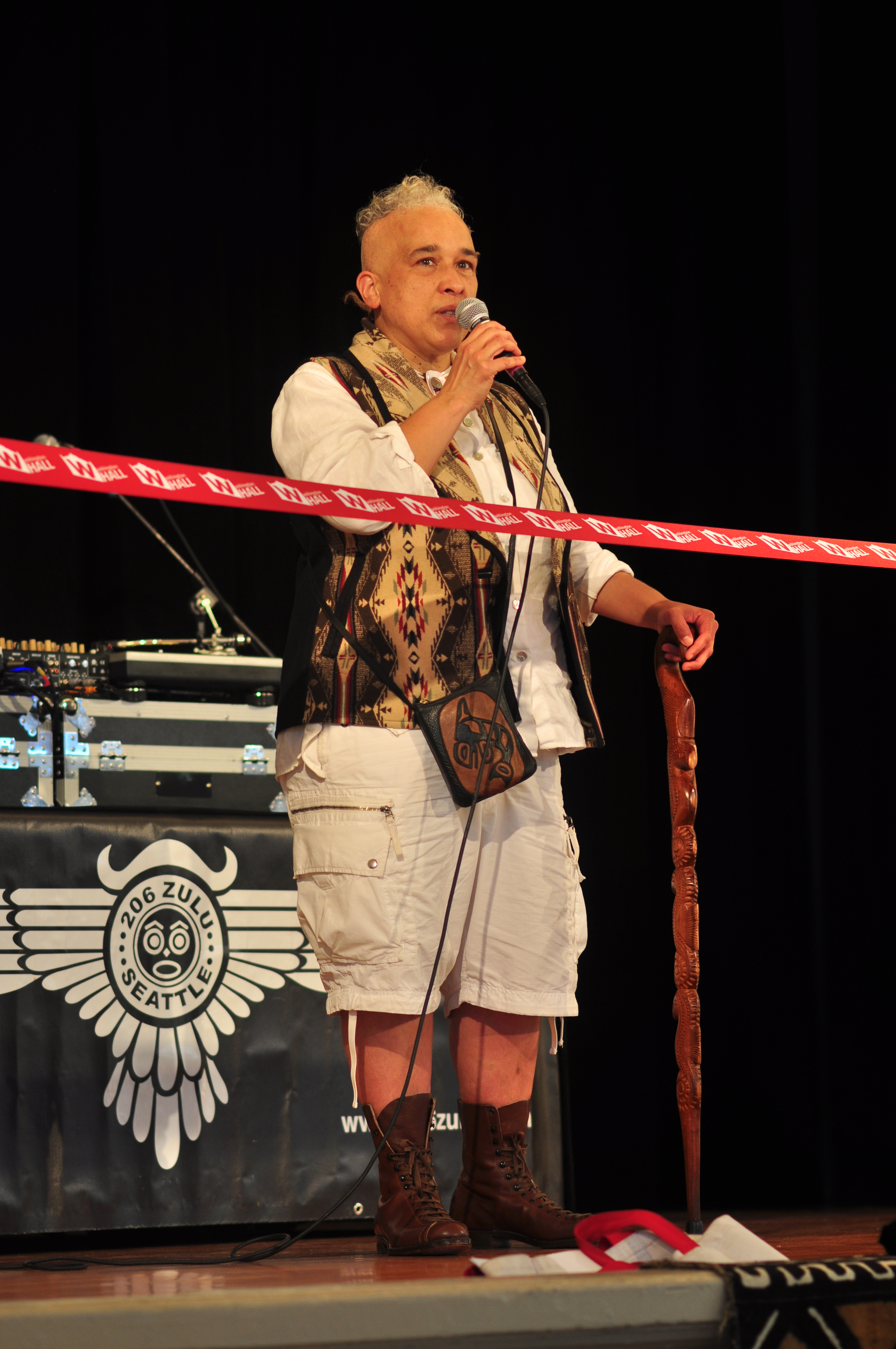
- Webber speaks at the reopening of Washington Hall in 2016
- Born: 1959 (age 66–67); Seattle, Washington, United States

Storme Webber (born 1959) is an American two-spirit interdisciplinary artist, poet, curator, and educator based in Seattle, Washington. She is descended from Sugpiaq (Alutiiq), Black, and Choctaw people.

In 2019, she was named a Seattle Living Legacy for building global awareness of the LGBTQ+, indigenous, Two Spirit, and Black populations of Seattle through her art, poetry, performances, and multimedia exhibits.

== Early life and education ==
Storme Webber was born in 1959 in Seattle, Washington, in Pioneer Square, formerly known as Seattle's "Skid Row". Her bisexual Black Choctaw father from Texas met her Sugpiaq (Alutiiq) mother there at the Casino, one of the oldest gay bars on the West Coast. Webber credits her Sugpiaq (Alutiiq) grandmother from Seldovia, Alaska for "starting her 'on the road of life'". Webber's grandmother raised her, teaching her how to read before she went to school, and how to appreciate music.

When she was 11 years old, Webber left her family and entered the foster care system. Due to her advanced academic and creative arts skills, Webber qualified for summer program at Lakeside School. After participating in the summer program for two years, Webber received a full scholarship to attend the school full-time. Webber came out as a lesbian at 16 years of age; as a teenager she organized a social group for lesbians of color which made her mother—who had come out as lesbian at the same age—very angry because she did not want her daughter to have a hard life.

Webber graduated from Lakeside School in 1977, then moved to New York City to attend The New School. In 2015, she earned her MFA in Intermedia Arts from Goddard College in Plainfield, Vermont.

== Career ==
Webber entered the art, poetry, and performance scene in New York City during the 1980s, where she displayed her first works in galleries in New York and San Francisco. In 1989, she published her first poetry collection Diaspora. In that same year, Webber also contributed work to Serious Pleasure, a lesbian erotica anthology published by Sheba Feminist Press in London, England.

In 2007, Webber established Voices Rising: Northwest LGBTQ Artists of Color to create a safe, welcoming, nurturing community of LGBTQ artists of color in Seattle to brainstorm, create, perform, and raise awareness of marginalization and systems of oppression in the larger society. The community maintains an active Facebook page to promote its events and related news articles.

Webber has received recognition for her multimedia works Blues Divine (2014) and Noirish Lesbiana (2014). Blues Divine is an ancestral mix tape which combines a book of poetry with an audiobook read by Webber. Her museum exhibit Casino: A Palimpsest (2017) combines archival photographs and storytelling with an art installation to record the history of The Casino, one of the oldest gay bars on the West Coast, as told and experienced by her family.

Webber has also produced and performed multiple solo theater works such as Buddy Rabbit, Noirish Lesbiana: A Night at the Sub Room, and Wild Takes of Renegade Halfbreed Bulldagger. These performances have earned acclaim in England, the Netherlands, and Germany. She has also been highlighted in documentaries including Venus Boyz, Hope in My Heart: The May Ayim Story, What's Right with Gays These Days?, (Living Two Spirit), and international performance tours.

Webber currently teaches creative writing at the University of Washington.

== Publications ==
Books

- Webber, Storme (November 9, 1989). Diaspora. New York, New York. OCLC 50074983.
- Webber, Storme (2014). Blues Divine. RiverShe Collective Arts. ISBN 978-0692378687. OCLC 922935207.

Contributions to anthologies

- Sheba Collective, ed. (1989). Serious Pleasure: Lesbian Erotic Stories and Poetry. London: Sheba Feminist Press.
- Beasley, Paul, ed. (November 9, 1992). "Storme Webber". The Popular Front of Contemporary Poetry: Anthology. London: Apples & Snakes. OCLC 27443684.
- Davies, Carol B., ed. (November 9, 1994). "Storme Webber". Black Women, Writing, and Identity: Migrations on the Subject. London: Routledge Press. OCLC 468346305.
- James, G. Winston, ed. (2007). "Storme Webber". Voices Rising: Celebrating 20 Years of Black Lesbian, Gay, Bisexual and Transgender Writing. Washington, DC: RedBone Press.
- Miscolta, Donna, ed. (November 9, 2009). "Storme Webber". Jack Straw Writers Anthology. 13. Jack Straw Productions. OCLC 827624014.
- Khafr, K. Abif, ed. (November 9, 2013). "Storme Webber". Cornbread, Fish and Collard Greens: Prayers, Poems & Affirmations for People Living with HIV/AIDS. Bloomington, IN: AuthorHouse. OCLC 857850585.
- "Storme Webber". Yellow Medicine Review. Spring 2018.

== Exhibits ==
- 2017: Casino: A Palimpsest

== Performances ==
- "Buddy Rabbit"
- 2010: "Wild Tales of a Renegade Halfbreed Bulldagger"
- 2014: "Noirish Lesbiana"

== Film appearances ==
Webber has appeared in the following films:

- 1997: Hope in My Heart: The May Ayim Story
- 2001: Black Russians (narration)
- 2002: Venus Boyz
- 2009: What's Right with Gays These Days?
- 2009: Living Two Spirit

== Awards and recognition ==
- 2009: Jack Straw Foundation Writer
- 2012: Patricia Van Kirk Scholarship, Pride Foundation
- 2015: James W. Ray Venture Project Literary Award
- 2017: Raynier Institute & Foundation, Frye Art Museum Grant
- 2017: City Artists Funding Program: Seattle Office of Arts and Culture
- 2019: Named "Seattle Living Legacy" by Seattle Civic Poet Anastacia-Renee
- 2026: Torchbearer "Carrying Change" Legend Award
