= Teal Building =

Building in Seattle, Washington, U.S.

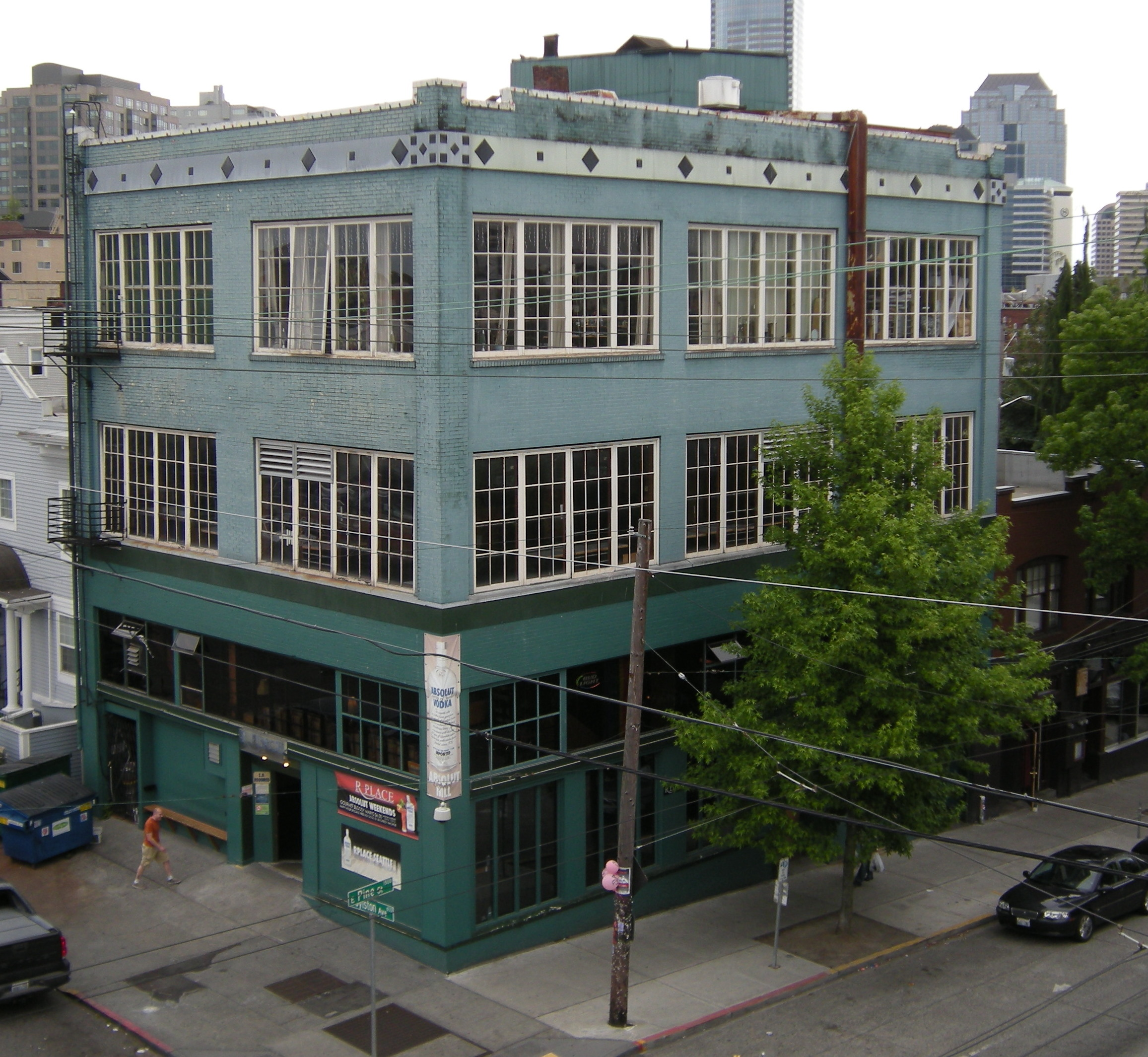
- The building's exterior in 2009
- Interactive map of the Teal Building area

General information
- Location: Seattle, Washington, United States
- Coordinates: 47°36′54.5″N 122°19′25.5″W

The Teal Building is a historic building at 619 East Pine Street on Seattle's Capitol Hill, in the U.S. state of Washington. The structure was once part of Auto Row.

== History ==
The building was acquired for $700,000 in 1994. It housed the gay bar R Place from 1996 to 2021.

As of 2021, the piano bar Keys on Main had planned to relocate to the Teal Building. In February 2022, the structure was sold for $2.5 million.

The building housed the immersive art experience Seattle: City of the Future in 2023. Following this, the gay club Massive opened later that year, and has remained in the space since.
