= Open Circle Theater =

Performance company in Seattle, Washington

Open Circle Theater was a multi-disciplinary performance company in Seattle, Washington. It was committed to the development of new works and adaptations that spoke to the human condition through fantasy and mythic storytelling. Founded in the early 1990s, the theater established its reputation for unique theater at a small black-box space in a warehouse in the Lake Union/Cascade neighborhood of Seattle, Washington. Throughout their seasons, Open Circle's resident company united with local directors, musicians, visual artists and performers, to bring fresh insight and invention to their creations of highly physical, ensemble-style theater. One of their popular events was the annual adaptation and production of the works of H. P. Lovecraft for the stage, which reflected their experiments with new and adapted work.

In 2008, due to development in the South Lake Union area where the new campus of Fred Hutchinson Cancer Research Center was set be constructed, the building Open Circle Theater had called home for ten years was torn down. After a year being itinerant, the company relocated to a space on the second floor of a building in the thriving neighborhood of Belltown, Seattle very close to downtown. The space opened in October, 2008 with their all new adaptation based on H.P. Lovecraft's works called The Necronomicon. The company shared the floor with the theater school Freehold.

Despite recent artistic and business management changes and a string of successful shows, the company was unable to maintain financial viability and officially closed in October 2011.

== Works ==
- Return to the Garden of Allah (2000), written by Ian Bell, directed by Scott Bradley, opened at Re-bar. A semi-fictional show about The Garden of Allah, Seattle's first gay cabaret owned by gay people. The show alternated between club acts inspired by The Garden's, and dressing room scenes portraying The Garden's performers like Jackie Starr, Nick Arthur, and Skippy LaRue.
