= Jorie Remus =

American comedian and actress

- Jorie Remus in Hawaii Five-O 1972
- Born: March 17, 1919; New York City, U.S.
- Died: June 16, 1998 (aged 79)
- Occupations: Comedian, actress
- Years active: 1950s–1982
- Known for: Nightclub performances, influence on Phyllis Diller and Maya Angelou
- Notable work: Performances at Purple Onion, The Hungry i, appearances on Tonight Starring Jack Paar, The Phil Silvers Show, Hawaii Five-O, Magnum, P.I.
- Spouse: Daniel A. Murray (div. 1961)

Jorie Remus (March 17, 1919 – June 16, 1998) was an American comedian and actress. She was born in New York City.

Remus performed in San Francisco at the Purple Onion and the hungry i during the 1950s. Her routine was performed while sitting on a piano like a chanteuse and talking about the challenges a modern woman faced on the dating scene.

Phyllis Diller was a fan of Remus before becoming a comedian herself. One night while watching Remus perform, Diller's husband Sherwood commented that Phyllis was funnier. Lloyd Clark, a performance coach, overheard the comment and worked with Diller, eventually getting her an audition at the Purple Onion. Diller assumed much of Remus' style, but added her own controlled lunacy.

Remus saw a singer named Marguerite Johnson sing the song "Run Joe" at the Garden of Allah and hired her to perform at the Purple Onion, working with her to help her become a professional, and suggested she name herself Maya Angelou. Angelou studied Remus' singing and comedy to learn how to hold an audience. Once Angelou was established at the Purple Onion, Remus traveled to New York to appear at the Blue Angel, helping to complete a bicoastal comedy circuit between San Francisco and New York. After finishing her appearance at the Blue Angel, Remus founded a short-lived New York based version of the Purple Onion called Jorie's Purple Onion, where the performers included Remus, Barbara McNair and Will Holt.

Following appearances on Tonight Starring Jack Paar and The Phil Silvers Show in 1958, she continued to appear in nightclubs through the early 1960s and then disappeared for several years. She moved to Hawaii and eventually turned up on several episodes of Hawaii 5-0 in the 1970s. Her last acting credit was on Magnum, P.I. in 1982.

== Quote ==
- "Have you ever known one of those years when everything seems to go all wrong? You wake up in the morning on the wrong side of your life. The first thing you discover is that your husband has run away with your best friend ... and you miss her"! -- Jorie Remus

== Personal life ==
Remus was married to Daniel A. Murray, but they were divorced in 1961 in Puerto Rico, where Remus founded a night club, The Gilded Cage.
