= Garden of Allah (cabaret) =

Gay cabaret in Seattle, Washington, US

Coordinates: 47°36′00″N 122°20′03″W

The Garden of Allah was a mid-20th century gay cabaret that opened in 1946 in the basement of the Victorian-era Arlington Hotel in Seattle's Pioneer Square. It was Seattle's most popular gay cabaret in the late 1940s and 1950s and one of the first gay-owned gay bars in the United States. It formed a key part of Seattle's social scene for gay and lesbian people in Seattle at the time.

The Garden catered to all factions of the LGBT community, though heterosexual patrons, tourists and military personnel on leave also visited. Acts were primarily female impersonation, though some male impersonators also performed: these performances would be known as drag today.

== Shows ==
The Garden ran two shows on weeknights, with three shows on Fridays and Saturdays. Performances often started with pipe organ music and Wanda Lester Brown and Billy DeVoe emceeing. The following acts included comedy, strip shows, songs, and revues, together lasting 45 minutes. Two Old Bags From Tacoma was a popular long-running comedy routine hosted by two drag comics. A finale called Cowgirls was also very popular. One act was the professional female-impersonation Jewel Box Revue, though that act was largely geared to and supported by hetero people. The Revue performed as the Garden's first act when the club opened in 1946.

Many of the entertainers came from the vaudeville and burlesque scene, and some had performed in all-girl revues, including The Rockettes. However, they were careful to pass in these groups because they often performed in places where cross-dressing was illegal. Regular performers at The Garden included Jackie Starr, Hotcha Hinton, Francis Blair, Ricky Reynolds, Kenny Bee, Jan Jannsen, Skippy LaRue, and Robin Raye. Headliners like Ray Bourbon, Lee Leonard, Bernie Carey, T.C. Jones, and Michael Phalen also performed for a month at a time.

The Garden often used racialized themes, or stereotypes, in its shows. Its performances arose from cultural traditions with racist imagery like minstrel shows and orientalism. The name "The Garden of Allah" evoked an orientalist fantasy, and some acts were labeled "jungle, harem, Hawaiian, Jewish, Hungarian, voodoo" or "oriental things".

== Space ==
There were separate sections in The Garden designated for women and men: women were allowed to dance with each other, but men could not dance with men. A policewoman monitored the club from inside, and people were bounced from the cabaret if they were seen making a public display of affection toward anyone of the same sex. Bill Parkin recalled that the space was softly lit by sconces with dark blue and pink fluorescent bulbs, calling the atmosphere "very, very seductive". Others recalled the place as "wild".

The owners prioritized gay men and lesbians as an audience, ensuring they were treated respectfully at The Garden. The cabaret also prioritized anonymity for its customers. At the same time, the venue advertised to Seattle tourists, similarly to Finochio's. The Garden was popular with gay, lesbian, and straight people, as well as tourists, locals, and soldiers. When the Navy realized sailors were frequenting the gay venue, it decided to make a list of gay bars that sailors were banned from. However, some queer sailors used it as a guide for which bars had a queer scene.

The Garden initially used a pipe organ in performances, a 2/10 Wurlitzer moved to the space in 1939 from the Rex Theatre in Eugene, Oregon. It was removed in 1953 when purchased by Alden Bice.

== History ==
Seattle's queer community began to create public spaces for themselves in the 1920s and 1930s. These tended to be formed only in certain neighborhoods, because "police found it convenient to keep the marginal types in one nicely packaged ghetto". Seattle had long persecuted queer citizens, and began creating sodomy laws, used to target gay and gender nonconforming people, in 1893. In Seattle, Pioneer Square began to host a vibrant queer club scene. Already nicknamed "Skid Road", the area was later nicknamed "Fairyville" (after a slur referring to gay men). During the 1930s, The Casino, Double Header, and Spinning Wheel were open to straight and gay customers.

Frank Reid and Fred Coleman were the initial owners of The Garden of Allah, opening it at 1st Ave between University and Seneca streets below the Arlington Hotel. Prior to becoming a cabaret, the space had been a speakeasy, during Prohibition, and then a tavern. Coleman already co-owned The Spinning Wheel on 2nd Ave and Union Street, which stayed open from 1934 to 1950. The Spinning Wheel ran vaudeville shows featuring live singing by drag queens, called female impersonators at the time.

More queer women joined The Garden's community after they had worked at Seattle factories during World War II, when opportunities for women increased. After the war ended, queer soldiers returning to Seattle frequented the club.

Patrons report that the cabaret became like a "family" or "support group", and Don Paulson, author of An Evening at the Garden of Allah: A Gay Cabaret in Seattle, noted that he believes the sense of community and group consciousness produced by the Garden was what made the gay rights movement of later decades possible.

=== Closure ===
The McCarthy era brought heavier restrictions on the LGBTQ community, and locally, new regulations on drag performers added rules like wearing men's underwear under costumes and carrying ID at all times. The U.S. military prohibited servicemen from visiting the Garden, and gay bars had to pay off the Seattle Police Department but still dealt with harassment. Kim Drake, who performed at The Garden, recalled that it got less popular after 1954. Beyond the restrictions the bar faced, drag styles were changing and lip-synching was growing more popular than older styles of female impersonation.

The Garden closed in 1956, when a combination of a rate raise from the musicians' union and a raise in city taxes on locales that provided both entertainment and alcohol put it out of business.

== Legacy ==
In 1996, Don Paulson and Roger Simpson wrote a history of The Garden: An Evening at the Garden of Allah: A Gay Cabaret in Seattle. It included oral histories and photos of the establishment.

The book inspired Ian Bell and Scott Bradley's play Return to the Garden of Allah, staged in 2000 by the Open Circle Theatre.
