= GenPride =

Podcast and newsletter on LGBTQ topics

- Formation: 2015, Seattle
- Founder: Karen Fredriksen-Goldsen
- Type: Nonprofit
- Legal status: Active
- Purpose: Charitable organization
- Headquarters: 1521 Broadway, Suite A Seattle, WA 98122
- Region served: Seattle, King County
- President: Richard Patterson
- Revenue: $1,438,015 (2022)
- Website: Official website

GenPride is a Seattle-based nonprofit organization serving the senior LGBTQ community in the city and surrounding King County. The organization formally incorporated as a non-profit charity in 2015 as "Generations with Pride" aka GenPride.

== Description and history ==
GenPride was founded by Karen Fredriksen-Goldsen, a professor and Director of the Goldsen Institute at the University of Washington, who was honored with the "2019 Outstanding Leadership Pride Award" by Seattle City Mayor Durkan for her research and work including the creation of GenPride.

The organization formally incorporated as a non-profit charity in 2015 as "Generations with Pride" aka GenPride to serve their mission of "advocating for older LGBTQIA+ adults' unique needs" through their programs to "support, eliminate discrimination, and honor the lives of older members of our community."

The formation of GenPride's community center is credited to a 2018 study from the University of Washington by Karen Fredriksen Goldsen, entitled, "Aging in Community: Addressing LGBTQ Inequities in Housing and Senior Services" which highlighted the "evident disparities in social inclusion, housing, and healthcare quality for LGBTQ+ aging adults compared to their non-LGBTQIA+ counterparts." Aside from the partnership that GenPride formed to help create the first of its kind senior housing facility for LGBTQ elders, the organization has also partnered with the city of Seattle's Human Services Department to help fund some of its programs, such as support groups, educational outings and health support services and training for caregivers.

GenPride published a book titled Unmuted: Stories of Courage and Resilience from the GenPRIDE in 2020.

In June 2024, GenPride hosted the 50th anniversary of Seattle Pride's kickoff event by hosting an exhibition partnering with the Museum of History & Industry titled "Objects of Pride" at their community center at Pride Place showcasing memorabilia from Pride events over the past 50 years.

== Pride Place ==
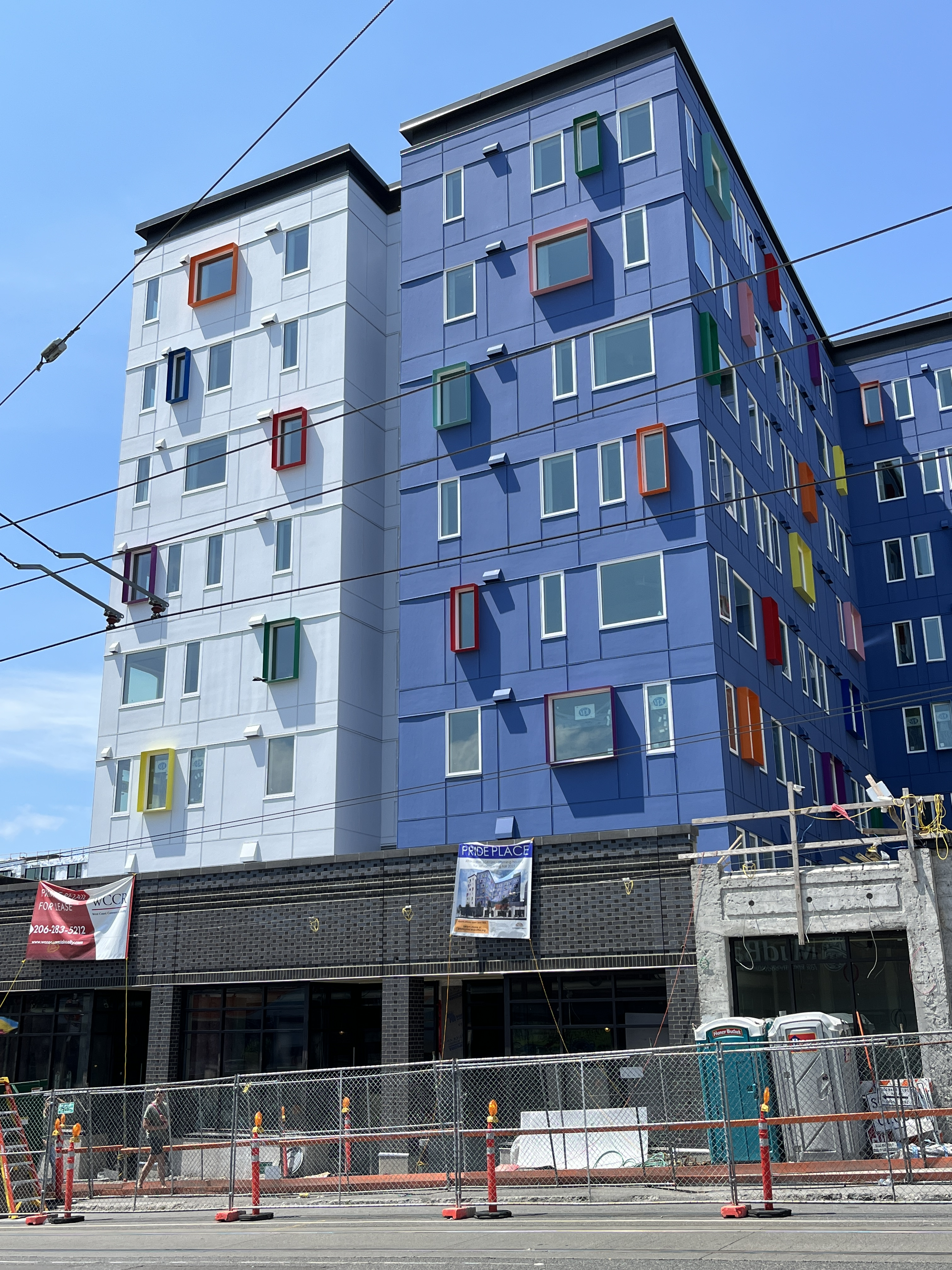
Pride Place, Seattle, 2023

GenPride is located inside the new Pride Place building in Seattle, the first senior LGBTQ housing community in Washington state, which had its grand opening on October 25, 2023. The first floor of the building houses the offices and community center of GenPride. Pride Place was created as a collaboration between GenPride and Community Roots Housing, an affordable housing provider founded in 1976 by Capitol Hill community activists concerned about redlining as part of a collaboration titled "Rise Together". The idea for the project began in 2017, with construction started in 2022 and completed in late 2023.

== Pillars of Pride ==
The organization created the annual Pillars of Pride awards in 2022 as part of their fundraising efforts to recognize and honor the "generation of elders who fought—and won—many of the rights we enjoy today", recognizing community leaders and partnering organization in their mission.

The 2024 awardees were:

- Dean R. Sargent – Bridging Legacies
- Paul Green – Building Belonging
- Alma Goddard – Community Catalyst
- Christine Wheeler-Sinclair – Iconic Artistry
- Isaac Payne – Building Belonging
- Rita Smith – Volunteer Virtuoso
- Pride Across the Bridge – Rainbow Partnership
