= Jorie Lueloff Friedman =

American journalist (1940–2026)

Jorie Lueloff Friedman (May 31, 1940 – March 12, 2026) was an American journalist. She was the first female reporter and first female news anchor at WMAQ Channel 5 in Chicago.

In 1972, she testified before Congress about her experience with credit discrimination after being prohibited from having credit cards in her own name following her 1970 marriage.

== Early life and education ==
Friedman was born in Milwaukee on May 31, 1940, and grew up in several Milwaukee suburbs. She earned a bachelor's degree in 1962 from Mills College in Oakland, California.

== Professional career ==
Friedman's first news job was writing for the Associated Press in New York starting in 1964. Prior to that, she worked for the Central Intelligence Agency.

In 1965, she became the first female reporter at WMAQ, an NBC affiliate in Chicago. She became the station's first female news anchor in 1966.

In 1984, Friedman left WMAQ to join WLS-Channel 7 in Chicago as a regular commentator.

Lueloff Friedman retired from journalism in 1992.

== Activism ==
In 1970, she married Richard Friedman. The couple met when she interviewed him during his mayoral race against Richard J. Daley.

Friedman testified before Congress in 1972 regarding her experience of credit discrimination and bias after her marriage. Prior to her marriage, Friedman had established nine years of credit history, which was dissolved once she reported her marital status. Complaints to congressional members inspired a bi-partisan panel to sponsor the hearings based on sex discrimination. Upon marriage, she requested updates to her existing credit cards with her name and address change. The companies, as in the case of Bonwit Teller, either closed her accounts or, as was the case with Marshall Field's, required her to reapply for credit using her husband's information. "Marriage had made me a non person," she reported.

One company, American Express, stopped sending her bills directly and instead sent them to her husband. He requested that the company send them directly to her as they had before the marriage. While Lueloff Friedman kept making payments, the company did not accept them as the account had been changed to her husband's name. This resulted in his own credit card being suspended during a trip and prevented him from accessing his hotel reservation. She testified that the practice was “not only unfair and demeaning, but ridiculous and unreasonable that a woman should have to forfeit her economic identity because she changed her name.”

The hearings resulted in Congress passing the Equal Credit Opportunity Act, signed into law by President Gerald Ford on October 28, 1974.

== Personal life and death ==
Lueloff Friedman and her husband were married for 51 years until his death in 2023. She died on March 12, 2026, at the age of 85.

== Awards ==
Friedman won an Emmy Award in the Chicago/Midwest division. In 1998, she received a Silver Circle Award.
