= Gay City Health Project =

Coordinates: 47.613998°N 122.324709°W

Gay City: Seattle's LGBTQ Center
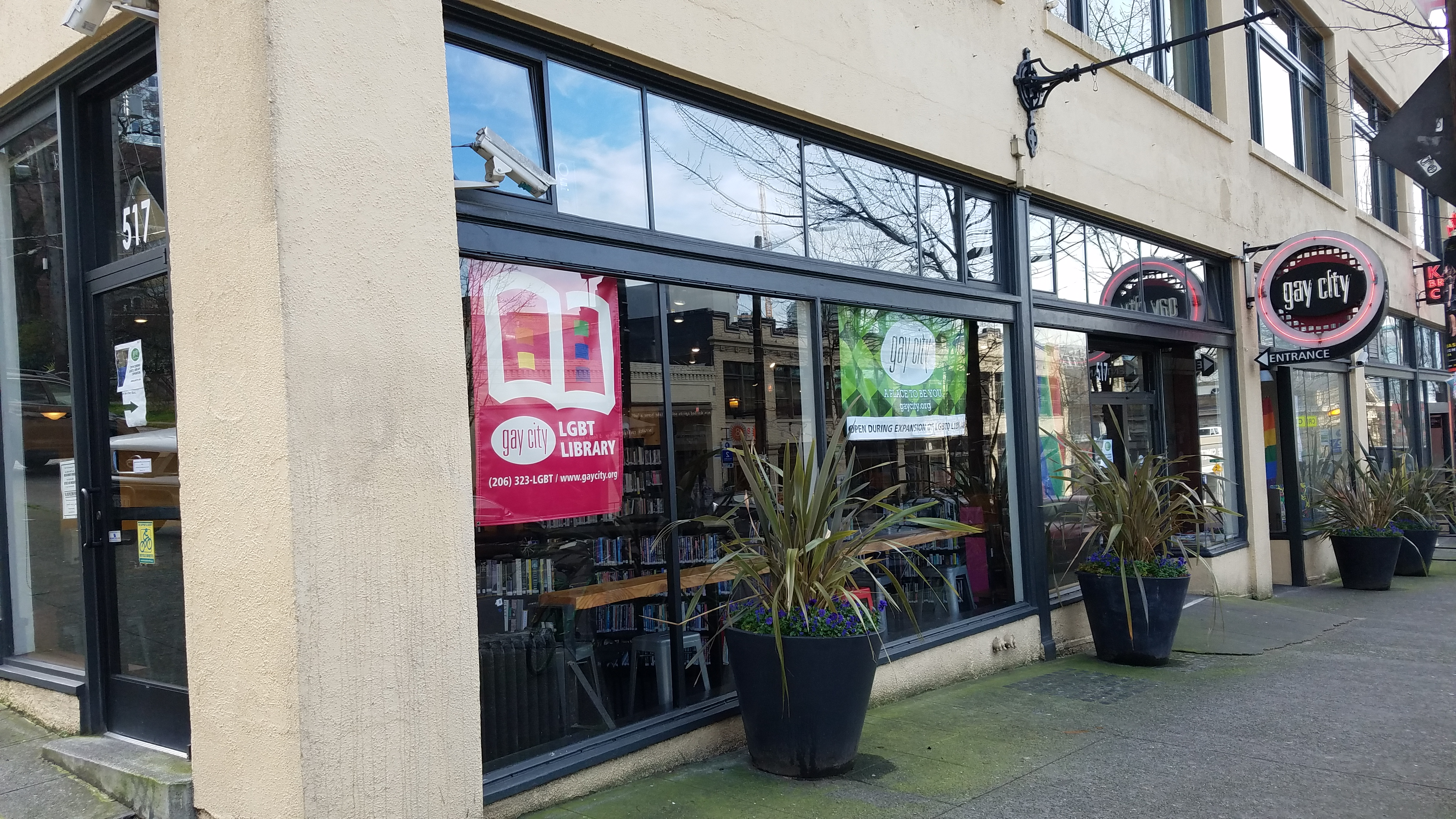
- Headquarters in Seattle, Washington
- Formation: 1995
- Type: LGBTQ community and health organization in Seattle
- Purpose: Health services, Library, Arts, Performing Arts, Resources, ORCA LIFT
- Headquarters: 400 E. Pine St, Seattle, WA 98122
- Region served: Seattle, Washington
- Official language: English
- Executive Director: Nakita Venus
- Website: gaycity.org

Seattle's LGBTQ+ Center, formerly known as Gay City: Seattle's LGBTQ Center (until 2022) and Gay City Health Project, is a 501(c)(3) multicultural LGBTQ nonprofit organization based in Seattle, Washington.

== History ==
Gay City formed in 1995 during the HIV/AIDS epidemic.

In the mid-2000s, Gay City introduced a Wellness Center that provided HIV testing and STI screening (syphilis, chlamydia, gonorrhea, and hepatitis C). The health services expanded in 2019 to five locations. According to their website, Gay City is the leading HIV/STI tester in King County.

In 2007, Gay City served as a research partner for the Seattle branch of the HIV Vaccine Trials Network.

The Seattle LGBTQ+ Center houses the Michael C. Weidemann LGBTQ+ Library, a library focusing on LGBTQ topics with over 8,000 books. The library was formerly named the LGBT Lending Library and held by the Seattle LGBT Community Center, until it closed in 2009. The library was inherited by Seattle LGBTQ+ Center that same year and renamed.

== Locations ==
In April 2022, Gay City moved into a new headquarters building at 400 E. Pine Street in the Capitol Hill neighborhood. Previously, Gay City was located at 517 E. Pike (two blocks south and one block east of the current location).

== Previous and Current Aliases ==
Seattle's LGBTQ Center has operated under various names in the past. The organization was founded as Gay Men’s Health Project in 1995. "As treatments for HIV/AIDS improved" the organization broadened its scope, eventually changing names to Gay City at some point before 2006. In 2006, the Seattle Commission for Sexual Minorities submitted a report to the mayor's office which contained an appendix that mentioned Gay City by name, stating its formal name to be Gay City Health Project. In 2022, the organization shortened their name from Gay City: Seattle’s LGBTQ Center to Seattle's LGBTQ+ Center, in conjunction with their relocation.

By 2025, the US National Prevention Information Network listed the organization as "Seattles LGBTQ Wellness Center".
