= Pride Place =

LGBTQIA+ senior housing development in Seattle, Washington, U.S.

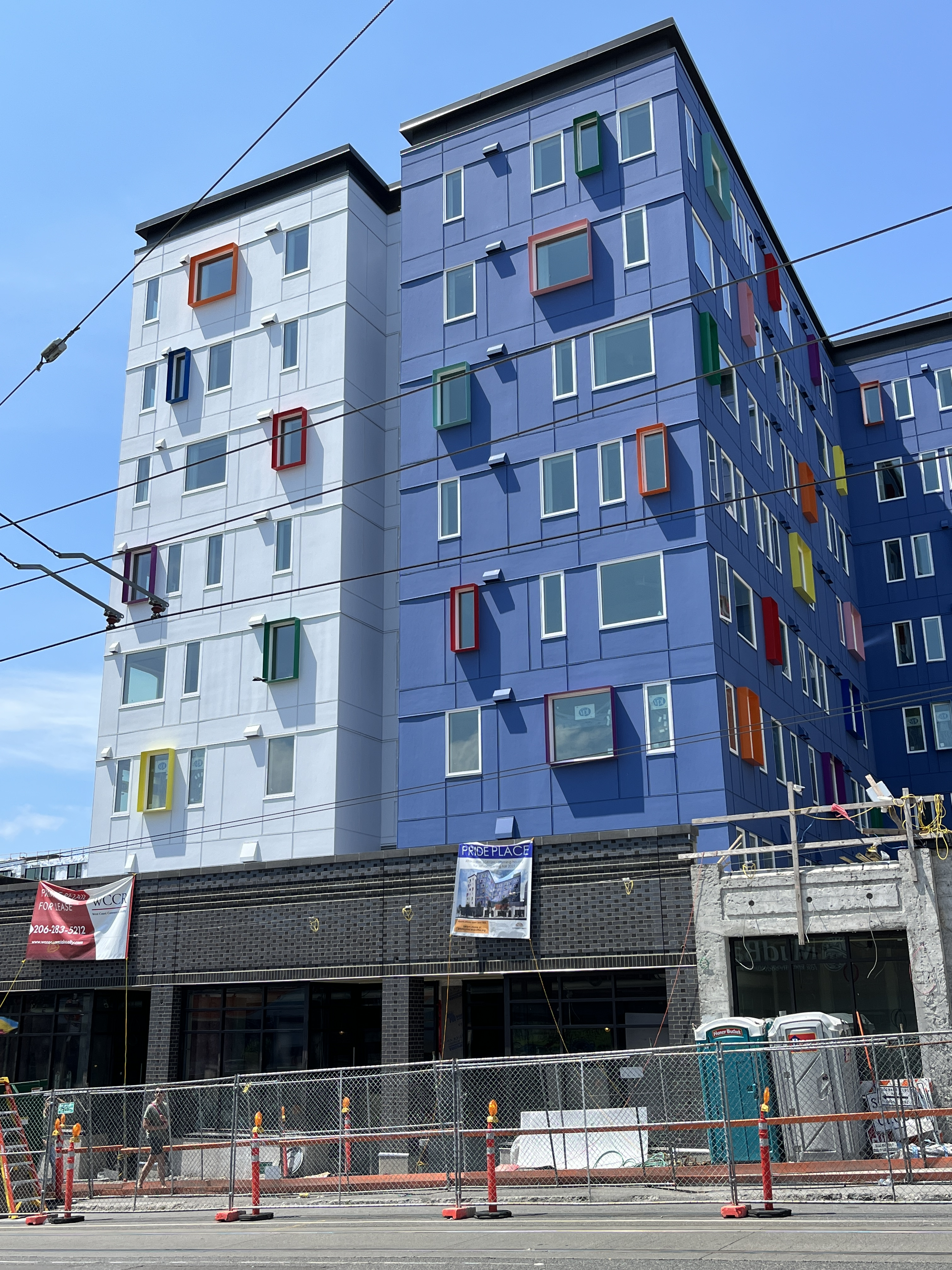
- The center during construction, June 2023
- Interactive map of the Pride Place area

General information
- Location: 1519 Broadway, Seattle, Washington 98122
- Coordinates: 47.614704°N 122.321012°W
- Year built: 2022-2023

Website
- Official website

Pride Place is a LGBTQIA+ senior housing community on Seattle's Capitol Hill, in the U.S. state of Washington. Located on Broadway between Pike and Pine, the project is considered the first of its kind in Washington. It will house 118 apartment units, a clinic, and offices for the GenPride Senior Center.

== History ==
In 2018, the City of Seattle's Office of Housing commissioned a report to examine the housing needs of older LGBTQIA+ adults. The Goldsen Institute at the University of Washington released a report titled, "Aging in Community: Addressing LGBTQ Inequities in Housing and Senior Services."

On June 15, 2023, the housing development began accepting applications.

It celebrated its grand opening on October 25, 2023. The first floor also houses a local community organization, GenPride, which serves as a community center.

The bubble tea shop Sunright Tea is slated to open in the building.
