= Gays Eating Garlic Bread in the Park =

LGBTQ event in the United States

- Country: United States
- Attendance: ~100 (Seattle, 2024)

Gays Eating Garlic Bread in the Park is a recurring LGBTQ event consisting of a casual picnic where guests are encouraged to "BYOGB" ("bring your own garlic bread"). The original event was held in Seattle in Meridian Park on May 13, 2024, and advertised via TikTok.

The event inspired similar meetups in Chicago; Omaha, Nebraska; Portland, Oregon; and Sioux City, Iowa. A second Seattle picnic was held on May 17, 2025.

== Seattle ==
The inaugural 2024 event was held in Meridian Park in Wallingford on May 13, with word spread through flyers and TikTok. Participants were asked to "BYOGB" ("Bring your own garlic bread"). Coverage of the event, which became a sort of community picnic, went viral. The event attracted as many as 100 people.

The 2025 event was also held at Meridian Park on May 17. Approximately 800 people participated in 2026.

== Portland, Oregon ==
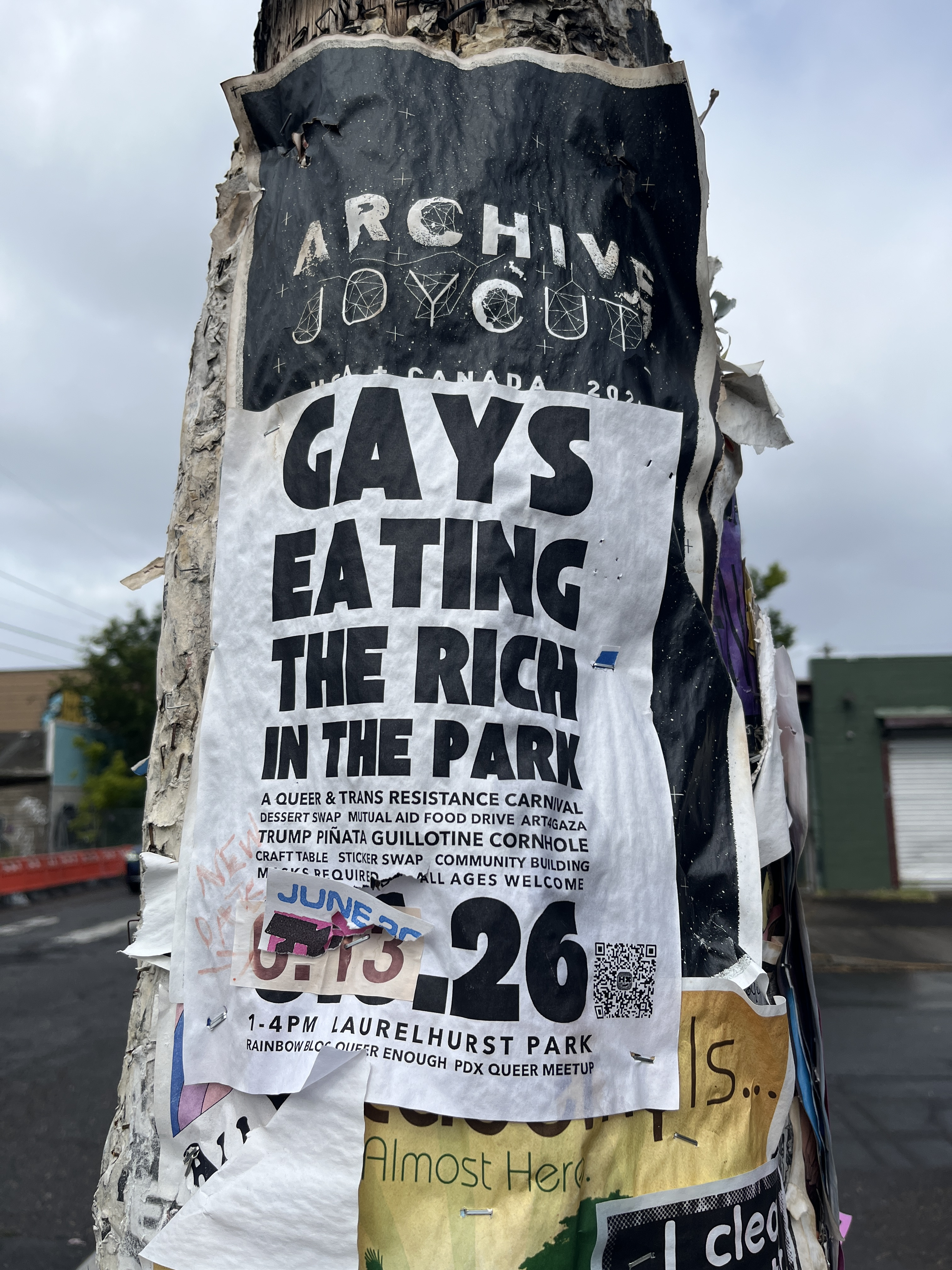
Sign for Gays Eating the Rich in the Park in Portland, Oregon, 2026

The first Portland event was held at Peninsula Park in Piedmont in July 2024. It was organized by Olive Tumbarello to coincide with local Pride celebrations.

In June 2025, Gays Eating the Rich in the Park was held at Laurelhurst Park. Inspired by Gays Eating Garlic Bread in the Park, the event was organized by PDX Queer Meetup and Rose City Indivisible.
