= R Place =

Gay bar and nightclub in Seattle, Washington, U.S.

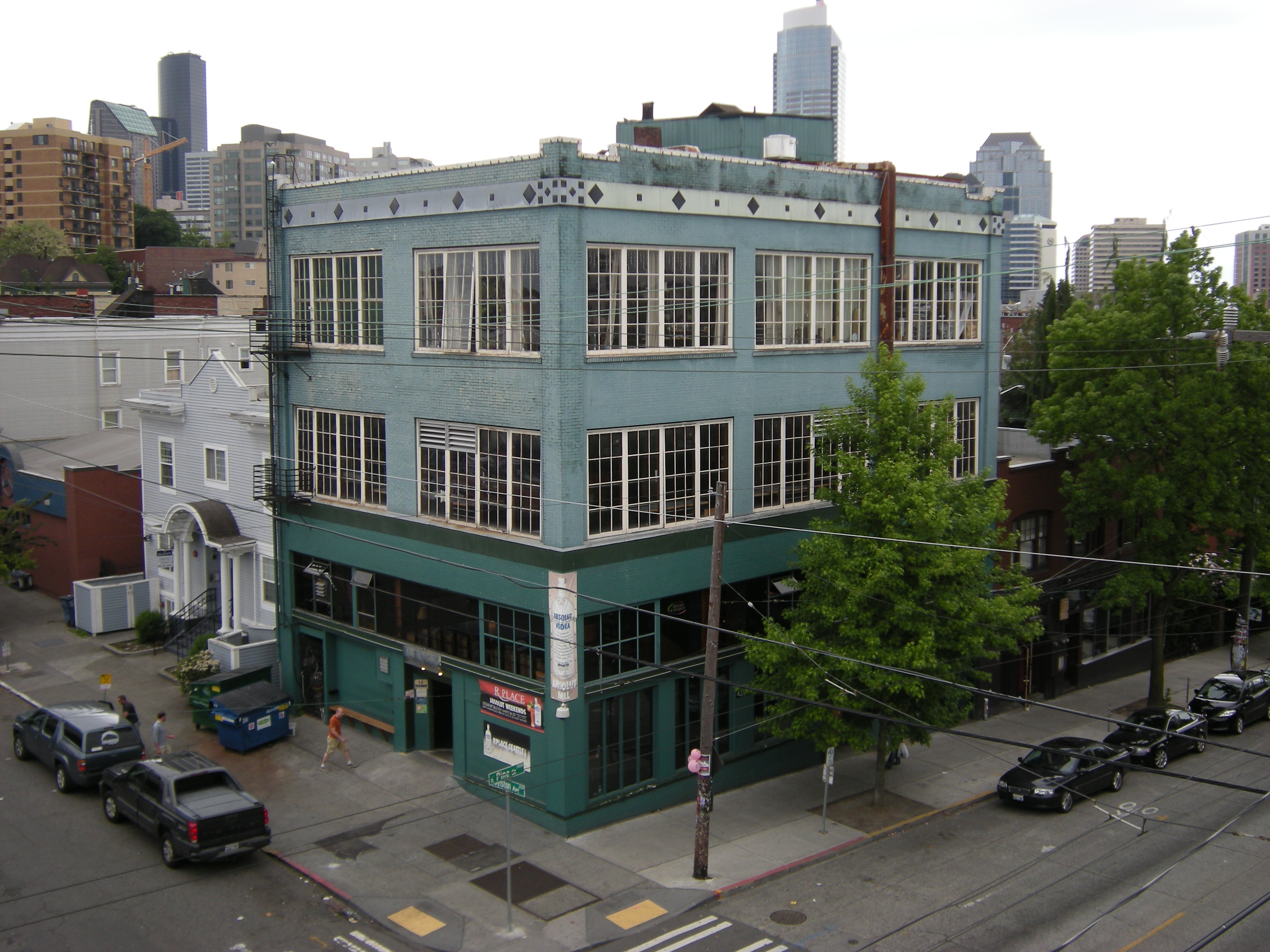
- Interactive map of R Place
- Address: 619 E. Pine St. Seattle, Washington; United States
- Coordinates: 47.61508°N 122.32365°W

R Place was a gay bar and nightclub in Seattle, in the U.S. state of Washington. The business operated in the Teal Building on Capitol Hill.

== History ==
R Place operated for over 35 years. The original location was at Pike and Boylston. In 1996, the bar moved to its second location was in the Teal Building on 619 East Pine Street.

R Place hosted a live drag show called, "So You Think You Can Drag", a competition hosted by Cookie Couture.

Owners Steve Timmons and Richard Elander announced the bar lost its lease in February 2021 due to complications arising from the COVID-19 pandemic. The owner of the Pine Street building had died and the estate did not renew the lease.

=== The Comeback ===
In October 2021, the owners of the R Place hoped to open a new bar in the former straight bar Eden building on 1950 First Avenue South in the SoDo neighborhood. Floyd Lovelady, general manager of R Place, and longtime patron John Fish became co-managers of the new project called "The Comeback Seattle LLC". The new bar opened in January 2022. The Comeback closed in May 2023.

== See also ==
- Impact of the COVID-19 pandemic on the LGBT community
