= Cuff Complex =

Gay bar and nightclub in Seattle, Washington, U.S.

- The Cuff
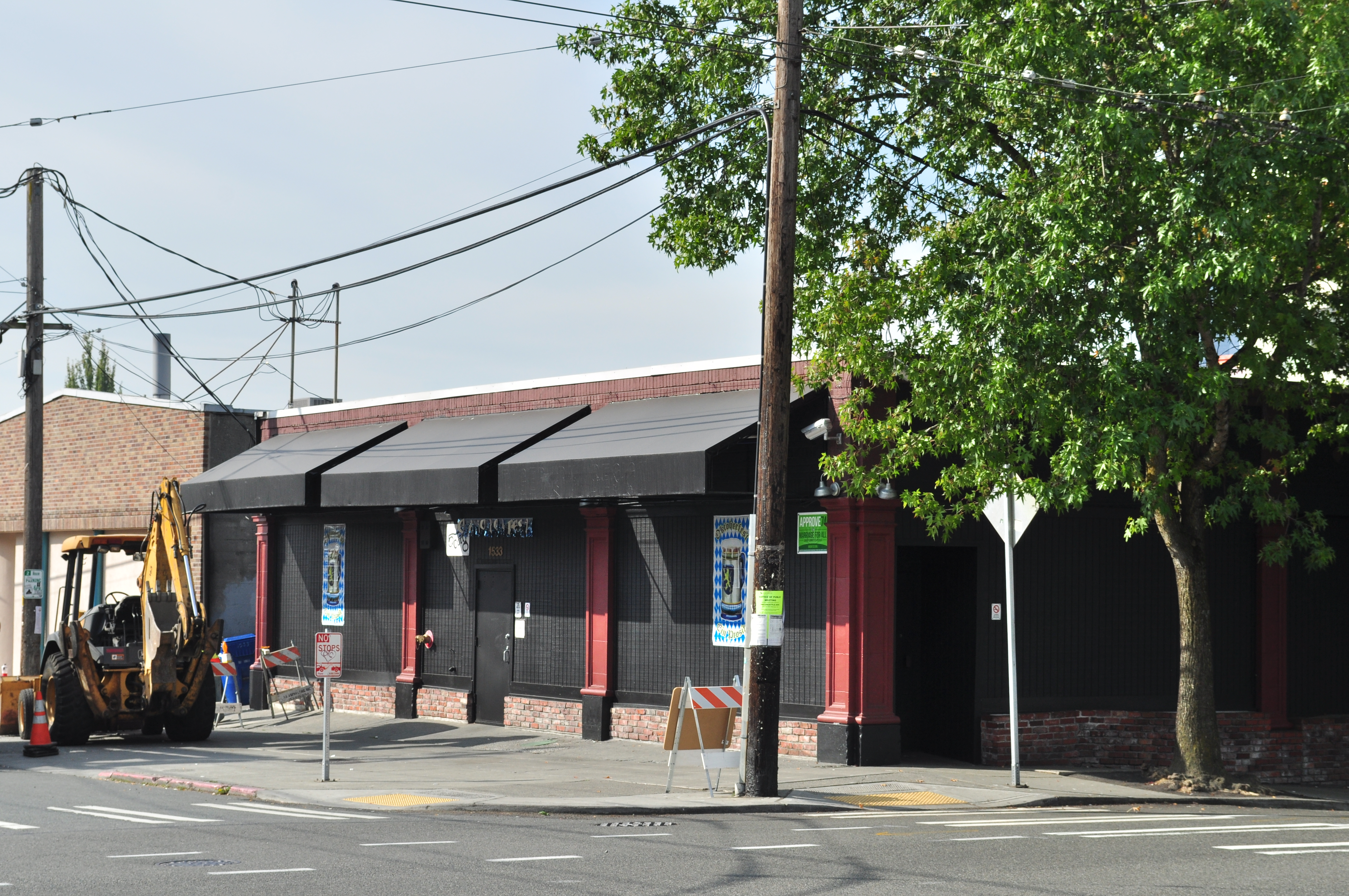
- The bar's exterior in 2012

- Location in Washington
- Address: 1533 13th Avenue
- Location: Seattle, Washington, United States
- Coordinates: 47.61511°N 122.31584°W
- Type: Gay bar, nightclub

Construction
- Opened: 1993

Website
- cuffcomplex.com

Cuff Complex, also known as The Cuff, is a gay bar and nightclub in Seattle, Washington, in the United States.

== Description and history ==
Cuff Complex is located at 1533 13th Avenue in Seattle's Capitol Hill neighborhood. The business features four bars and a large deck. It attracts a diverse crowd, but is known for leather.

The bar was established by two men who wanted a "positive social outlet for people who were into leather, Levi's and uniforms". Cuff, Ltd. was created in December 1992 and building construction began in January 1993. Randy Fields purchased Cuff in 2004. The bar celebrated its twentieth anniversary in March 2013.

Cuff Complex hosts meetings and social gatherings for Northwest Bears, POZ Seattle (a grassroots organization of HIV+ gay men), Seattle Men in Leather, the Sisters of Perpetual Indulgence, and the Rainbow Alliance of the Deaf. It also hosts an annual Sunday Pride Street Party.

== Reception ==
In 1995 and 2001, Cuff Complex received the Business of the Year award as part of the Pantheon of Leather Awards.

In 2009, Seattle Weekly said of the bar's clientele, "Whereas gay clubs like Neighbours and R-Place have been infiltrated by heteros in recent years, the Cuff still retains a predominantly gay male crowd. Maybe it's the sex shop full of cock rings and flogs. Or the portrait of a lion having sex with a dude on the wall. Or the fact that ladies are quarantined to a single unisex bathroom. Whatever the reason, vaginas are few and far between at the Cuff."

== See also ==
- List of LGBTQ bars
