= The Double Header =

Gay bar in Seattle

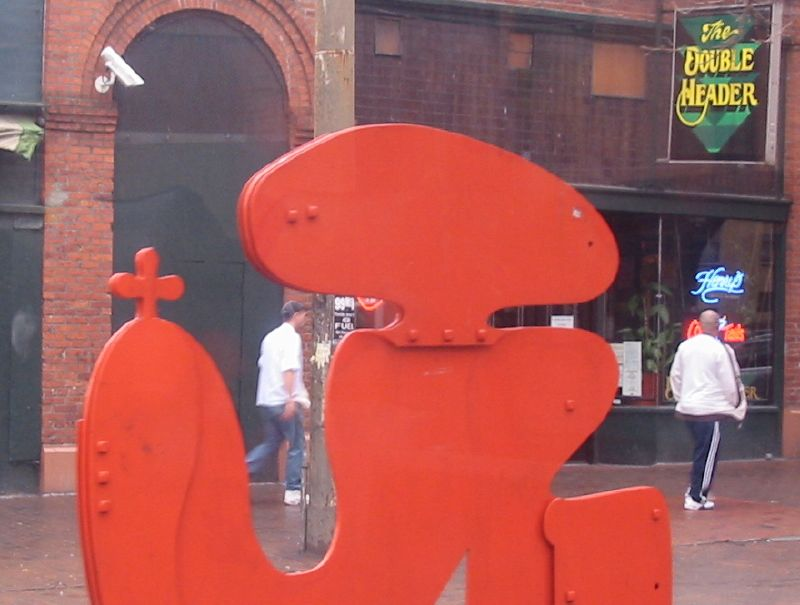
- The Double Header in 2007
- Interactive map of The Double Header
- Address: 407 2nd Avenue Extension South
- Location: Seattle, Washington, U.S.
- Coordinates: 47.60114°N 122.3322932°W

Construction
- Opened: 1934
- Closed: December 2015

The Double Header was a gay bar located at 407 2nd Avenue S in Seattle's Pioneer Square neighborhood, in the U.S. state of Washington. The establishment opened in 1934 and closed in December 2015. It was thought to be the oldest operating gay bar in the United States. The bar was frequented by both gay men and lesbians, which was unusual for the time.

In the basement of the building, a gay dance club called The Casino operated from the 1930s to the 1950s. The Casino was popular with drag queens. Eventually the LGBT-friendly atmosphere of The Casino spread to The Double Header, turning it gradually into a gay bar. In the 1950s The Casino was converted into a diner.

The Double Header was established by Joseph Bellotti Senior, replacing a merchant marine bar which previously occupied the space. His son Joseph Bellotti Junior took ownership of the bar some time in the 1960s. Belloti Jr. retired, closing the bar in December 2015 and selling the building in March 2016 for US$4.2 million (2016) (equivalent to US$5.63 million in 2025), with the Ewing & Clark real estate group handling the sale. In 2016 Ewing & Clark president Tom Graff said that a letter of intent to purchase the building was signed by an unnamed potential buyer, and that the buyer intended to convert the building into a live music venue while retaining "the Double Header name and regalia."

== Location ==
The Double Header was located just south of Yesler Way, facing the 2nd Avenue South Extension. This placed the Double Header one block south of Smith Tower. By the time The Double Header closed it was situated on a major transit hub. Pioneer Square station opened in 1990 on the same block as Smith Tower, and several local and inter-city busses stopped at the 2nd Ave Ext S & Yesler Way stop, in front of The Double Header.

== Decline as a Gay Bar ==
During the 1970s, the cost of living in the Pioneer Square neighborhood rose as rent prices noticeably increased, pushing the LGBTQ community north and across the I-5 highway into the Capitol Hill neighborhood. The Seattle Post-Intelligencer writes that:

The Double Header was once at the epicenter of Seattle's gay culture, until the city's gay scene moved from Pioneer Square to Capitol Hill in the late 1970s. ...Now the Double Header is no longer considered a gay bar.

— Kery Murakami, No longer at the center of Seattle's gay scene, bar still serving outsiders, Seattle P.I. (June 22, 2007)

== See also ==
- List of LGBTQ bars
