= The Casino (Seattle) =

Defunct LGBT club in Seattle, Washington, U.S.

- Madame Peabody's Dancing Academy for Young Ladies; The Dance
- Interactive map of The Casino
- Address: 172 S. Washington Street
- Location: Seattle, Washington, U.S.
- Coordinates: 47.6011°N 122.3321°W
- Operator: John and Margaret Delevitti

Construction
- Opened: 1930

The Casino (nicknamed "Madame Peabody's Dancing Academy for Young Ladies" and "The Dance") was a gay and lesbian dance club, café, pool hall, and card room located in Pioneer Square in Seattle. It was opened by Joseph Bellotti Sr. in 1930 and managed by his in-laws John and Margaret Delevitti in the basement of the building where The Double Header would be located in 1934.

== History ==
[The owners of The Casino] John and Margaret wouldn't let anyone mess with the queens. A queen was anyone who was gay and didn't try to hide it. They protected us and we loved them for that. ... The Casino was the only place on the West Coast that was open and free for gay people.

— Velma, 1966

The Casino was a venue occupying the space of the former People's Theater, which had been in operation from 1890 to 1904. The club was run by John and Margaret Delevitti, a heterosexual couple that cared for gays in the city. The club was known as one of the places most welcoming of gays on the West Coast, and became popular with drag queens.

At the time, it was not widely allowed for men to dance together, but they were allowed to do so at The Casino, because the establishment paid off local policemen. This fact made the establishment popular, via an underground network of information about nightlife for gays and lesbians, and caused it to be known as something of a speakeasy. Prior to the legalization of dancing of same-sex couples, same-sex contact at The Casino was primarily through conversations and stealthy eye contact via the bar's mirrors.

In the mid-1950s, The Casino was converted into a diner. It was named in a 1966 investigative article in The Seattle Times as one of the bars which attracted a gay clientele; the Armed Forces Disciplinary Control Board had added The Casino to a list of 14 bars "under investigation for homosexual activity", but for unspecified reasons recommended that it be "dropped from observation".

== Legacy ==
Interdisciplinary artist Storme Webber created a 2017 museum exhibition called Casino: A Palimpsest, based on her memories of visiting the establishment with her mother in the 1960s. She experienced The Casino when it was a diner, but still as an important meeting place for marginalized communities. The exhibit was displayed at the Frye Art Museum.
