= The 19 Bar =

Gay bar in Minneapolis

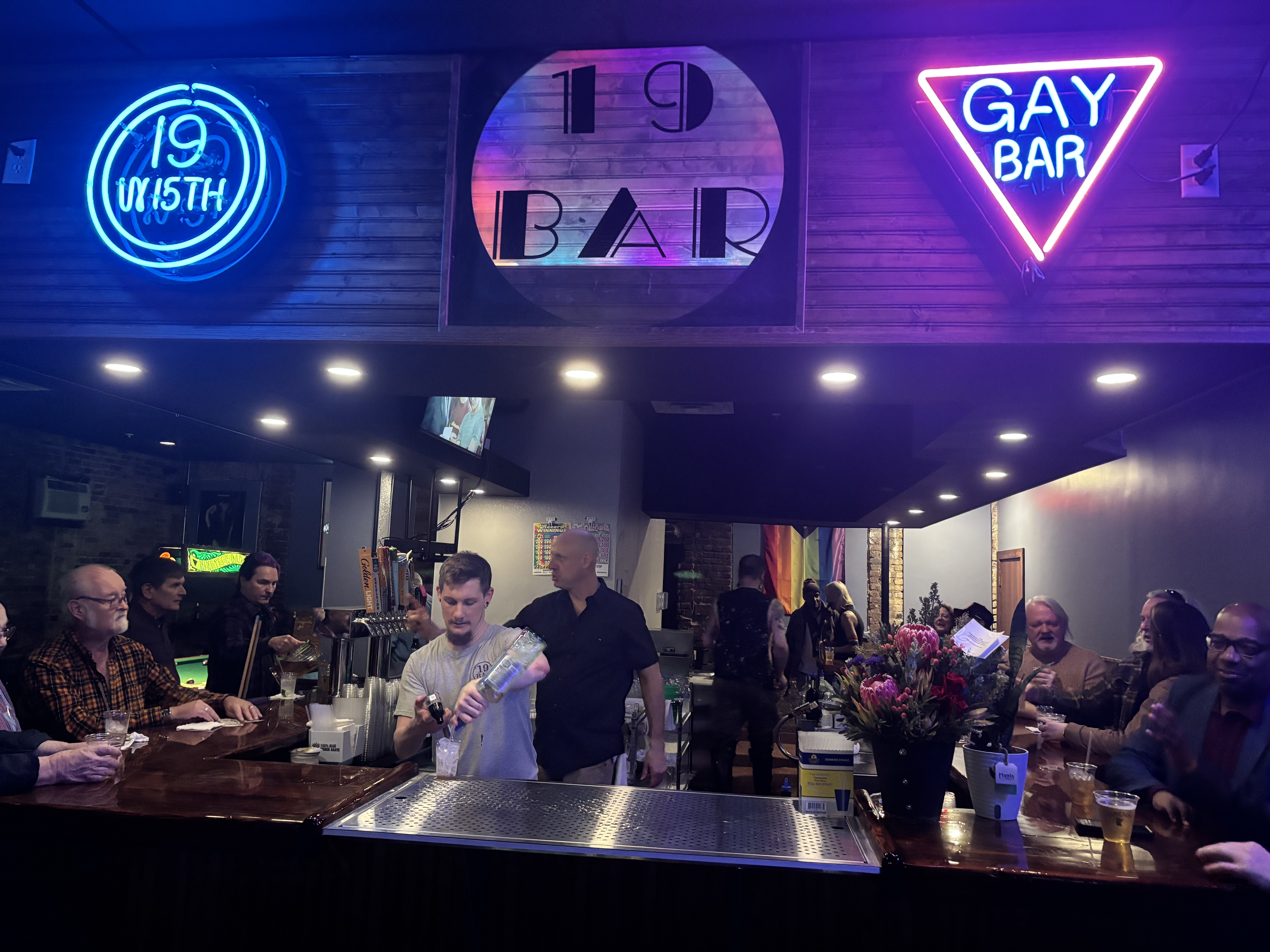
- Interactive map of The 19 Bar

Restaurant information
- Established: c. 1952
- Location: 19 W 15th Street, Minneapolis, Minnesota
- Coordinates: 44°58′04″N 93°16′43″W

The 19 Bar is a gay bar located at 19 W 15th Street in the Loring Park neighborhood of Minneapolis, Minnesota. Founded in 1952, it is the oldest gay bar in Minneapolis and among the oldest in the United States. The establishment is as a cash-only dive bar that offers a classic jukebox, pool tables and dart boards. In 2012, the Star Tribune named it the best "old-school gay bar" in their Best of Minnesota series.

== Name ==
Previously officially named Club 19 West, the bar has long been referred to as the 19 Bar.

== History ==
In 1922, architectural firm Magney and Tusler, best known for their work on the Foshay Tower, developed 19 W 15th Street as a laundry service. It was converted to the 19 Bar by Harry S. Kirshbaum, who sold the bar in 1952 to life partners Everett Stoltz and George Koch. The bar has been LGBTQ-owned since that time and functioned as a gay bar since 1957.

Initially, The 19 Bar was a "3.2 bar" with a license to serve 3.2-ABV alcohol and below. This license this allowed it to stay open later than other bars, which were required to close at midnight on Sundays, causing large rushes on Sunday nights. This pattern persisted until their license changed in the 1990s.

During the twentieth century urban renewal era, the original queer neighborhood in the Minneapolis Gateway District was demolished. The 19 Bar was one of the surviving establishments that shifted the locus of queer culture in Minneapolis along Hennepin Avenue, down to Loring Park.

In February, 1961, The 19 was robbed as part of a shooting spree by "Mad Dog Killers" Charles Brown and Charles Kelley, who went on to become the last people executed in Iowa. Alongside other 3.2 bars in Loring Park, The 19 was closed by law enforcement in 1963 under complaints that it drew local drunks to the area. During its closure, the Minneapolis Police Department's license inspector called it a "hangout for homosexuals"

External image
- Hennepin County Library collections
- Photograph of the 19 Bar between 1970–1980

By the early 1980s, it had solidified its reputation as a neighborhood establishment and a popular Sunday-night alternative to larger spaces such as Gay 90s and The Saloon. In 1980, the Loring Nicollet Community Council (LNCC) sought to demolish the bar in favor of a shopping mall. When criticized by gay activist Robert Halfhill, alderwoman Barbara Carlson denied the existence of such a plan while describing complaints bout the bar's late hours and demolition did not proceed. It was remodeled in 1983 by then-owner Ray Onstine, who relocated the entrance to the north wall. Later that decade, in 1986, the bar was briefly closed after targeted arson and vandalism. Gary Hallberg bought the business in 1992 and the building a few years later before expanding the space; he owned the establishment for over 30 years.

On March 22, 2024, the bar caught fire and was forced to close after a garbage truck collided with a nearby utility pole. Owner Gary Hallberg sued the trash company for $2.8 million, citing a potential sale that was cancelled due to the fire. In February 2025, just under a year later, the establishment reopened with a ribbon-cutting ceremony. Soon after, bar ownership was transferred to manager Craig Wilson.

== Reception ==
In 2012, the Star Tribune named it the best "old-school gay bar" in their Best of Minnesota series. In 2013 Autostraddle named the 19 Bar as one of the best dive bars to find other queer women, and praised its unpretentious and casual atmosphere. Reporter Jacqui said, "This is one of those beautiful bars where you can get a bag of popcorn for $1; yes, the microwave kind." Eater in 2015 ranked the location as one of the bars with the best cheap cocktails in the city, adding: "There's a reason this spot is the perennial best gay bar on every 'best of' list." After the reopening in June of 2025, Mpls.St.Paul Magazine called the bar "immensely beloved" by the community.

== See also ==
- List of LGBTQ bars
