= Toad Hall (disambiguation) =

Toad Hall is the fictional residence of Mr. Toad in The Wind in the Willows.

Toad Hall may also refer to:

- Toad Hall (ANU), a residential hall in Australian National University
- Toad Hall Bar, gay bar in San Francisco

== See also ==
- Hardwick House, Oxfordshire
- Mapledurham House in Oxfordshire
- Fawley Court in Buckinghamshire
