= List of LGBTQ bars =

An LGBT bar is a drinking establishment that caters to an exclusively or predominantly lesbian, gay, bisexual, transgender or queer (LGBTQ+) clientele. Bars and nightclubs have historically served as centers of gay culture due to their role as some of the few places people with same-sex orientations and gender-variant identities could openly socialize.

While many LGBT bars have historically catered specifically to men, lesbian bars cater exclusively or predominantly to lesbian women. Some bars of both types are now considered "queer" bars, welcoming LGBTQ+ people of all genders.

This is a list of notable LGBT bars worldwide. This is not a complete list.

== Africa ==
Bar	City	Country	Year opened	Year closed	Notes
Amsterdam	Cape Town	South Africa			
Babylon the Bar	Johannesburg	South Africa			
Beaulah Bar	Cape Town	South Africa			
Bronx	Cape Town	South Africa			
Zer021	Cape Town	South Africa			

== Asia ==
Bar	City	Country	Year opened	Year closed	Notes
Aiiro Cafe	Tokyo	Japan			
Commander D	Taipei	Taiwan			
Dragon Men	Tokyo	Japan			
Sunee Plaza	Pattaya	Thailand	1996		Area known for LGBT nightlife, including more than 50 institutions Opened in 1996 as Crazy Pub.
Video Pub	Jerusalem	Israel	2012		

== Australia ==
Bar	City	Country	Year opened	Year closed	Notes
Capriccio's	Sydney	Australia	1969	2008	
Connections Nightclub	Perth, Northbridge	Australia	1975		Known colloquially as Connies
Ruby Reds	Surry Hills, Sydney	Australia	1975	1980s	Closed and reopened as "Rubies". Site functioned as other venues for LGBTQ+ patrons from 1980s to 2023

== Europe ==
Bar	City	Country	Year opened	Year closed	Notes
Admiral Duncan	London	England	c. 1832 (possibly earlier)		One of the oldest gay pubs in Soho
The Backstreet	London	England	1985	2022	
The Black Cap	London	England	1751 (as Mother Black Cap)	2015	Known for drag cabaret
Café 't Mandje	Amsterdam	Netherlands	1927	1982	One of the first gay bars in the Netherlands. Closed in 1982 and reopened in 2007
Café 't Mandje	Amsterdam	Netherlands	2007		One of the first gay bars in the Netherlands. Closed in 1982 and reopened in 2007
The Coleherne	London	England	1866	2008	Known as a popular landmark leather bar during the 1970s and 1980s
Comptons of Soho	London	England	1986		Known as "The Grand Dame of Queer Street"
Cruz 101	Manchester	England	1992		One of the most popular and longest-running gay clubs in Greater Manchester
DTM	Helsinki	Finland	1992	2025	Formerly the largest gay club in Northern Europe
Eldorado	Berlin	Germany	c. 1848	1932	Name of multiple early queer and gay clubs in Berlin, closed by the Nazi's
The George	Dublin	Ireland	1985		One of Ireland's oldest and largest gay bars, and the most popular in Dublin
The George and Dragon	London	England	1716		Historic venue
Heaven	London	England	1979		Superclub with major influence in the development of London's LGBT scene
Hercules	Helsinki	Finland	2000		Most popular gay club in Helsinki
The Joiners Arms	London	England	1997	2015	Central to the East London gay scene
Kiki	Reykjavik	Iceland	2014		Iceland's only gay bar
London Astoria	London	England	1976	2009	Home to G-A-Y until 2008
Le Queen	Paris	France	1991	c. 2019	
The New Penny	Leeds	England	1953		First gay venue in the UK to open outside London
The Queen Adelaide	Hackney, London	England	1834		Inherited furnishings from the closure of the George and Dragon in 2015
The Queen's Head	Amsterdam	Netherlands	1998		
Pan Club Copenhagen	Copenhagen	Denmark	1970	2007	One of Europe's largest gay clubs and the biggest in Copenhagen
Pantibar	Dublin	Ireland	2007		Run by drag queen and activist Rory O'Neill
Royal Vauxhall Tavern	London	England	1862		South London's oldest surviving queer venue
Tom's Bar	Berlin, Schöneberg	Germany	1982	2024	
Trade	London	England	1990	2008	
The WayOut Club	London	England	1993		One of London's best known transgender venues
XXL	London and Birmingham	England	2000	2019	Nightclub catering to the bear sub-group

== North America ==
Bar	City	State	Country	Year opened	Year closed	Notes
3 Dollar Bill	New York City	New York	United States	2018		
The 19 Bar	Minneapolis	Minnesota	United States	1952		Oldest gay bar in Minneapolis
The Abbey	West Hollywood	California	United States	1991		Called the "Los Angeles equivalent to the Stonewall Inn", central to LGBT culture in Los Angeles
Los Amigos	Puerto Vallarta, Zona Romántica	Jalisco	Mexico	1998	2025	
Atlantic House	Provincetown	Massachusetts	United States	1798		Contender for oldest gay bar in the United States
Axis Nightclub	Columbus	Ohio	United States	c. 2001		Staple of Columbus nightlife
Badlands	Portland	Oregon	United States	2024		Operating in the former location of Embers Avenue
The Bar Complex	Lexington	Kentucky	United States	1963		The oldest continuous LGBTQ gathering place in Kentucky
Bar Champs	Montréal	Quebec	Canada	2021		Lesbian sports bar
Bar Frida	Puerto Vallarta	Jalisco	Mexico	2001		Various locations within the city
The Bistro	Bloomington	Illinois	United States	1993(?)		College town LGBTQ+ bar whose current era of direction started in 1993
Black Banana	Philadelphia	Pennsylvania	United States	1971	1990s (early)	European-style nightclub
Black Cat Bar	San Francisco	California	United States	1906	1921	At center of early legal fight establishing protections for gay people in the United States
Black Cat Bar	San Francisco	California	United States	1933	1964	At center of early legal fight establishing protections for gay people in the United States
Black Cat Tavern	Los Angeles, Silver Lake	California	United States	1939		Site of one of the first demonstrations in the United States protesting police brutality against LGBT people
Black Eagle	Montreal	Quebec	Canada			
Blueberry Hill	Durham	North Carolina	United States	early 1970s	late 1970s	Reportedly the first gay bar in Durham, North Carolina
Boxer's Ringside	Durham	North Carolina	United States	2000	2007	
Cafe Lafitte in Exile	New Orleans	Louisiana	United States	1933		Claims to be the oldest continuously operating gay bar in the United States
CC Slaughters	Portland	Oregon	United States	1981		Two locations in Portland, OR, USA and Puerto Vallarta, Mexico
CC Slaughters	Puerto Vallarta		Mexico			Two locations in Puerto Vallarta, Mexico, and Portland, OR, USA
Circus Disco	Los Angeles, Hollywood	California	United States	1975	2016	Large Latinx clientele excluded form many other LGBTQ bars. Cesar Chavez addressed an LGBTQ community meeting here in 1983.
Celebrities Nightclub	Vancouver	Alberta	Canada	1978		
Club 70	Edmonton	Alberta	Canada	1970	1978	
Club Era	Durham	North Carolina	United States	2024		
Club Universe	San Francisco, South of Market	California	United States	1994		
Crews & Tangos	Toronto	Ontario	Canada	1994		
The Cuff	Seattle	Washington	United States	1993		A complex featuring four bars and a large deck, known for leather.
Diesel	Seattle	Washington	United States	2011		Bear bar
The Double Header	Seattle	Washington	United States	1934	2015	Upon closing, one of the oldest operating gay bars in the United States
Down the Street	Asbury Park	New Jersey	United States	1988	1999	At close, was the oldest and longest-operating gay disco in New Jersey
Downtown Olly's	Indianapolis	Indiana	United States	2002		
The Eagle's Nest	New York City	New York	United States	1970		First gay bar to operate under the name "The Eagle"
El Rio	San Francisco, Mission District	California	United States	1978		First gay bar to debut queer salsa in San Francisco
Embers Avenue	Portland	Oregon	United States	1969	2017	Former gay bar and nightclub
Esta Noche	San Francisco, Mission District	California	United States	1979	2014	First Latino gay bar in San Francisco
Mr. Flamingo	Puerto Vallarta	Jalisco	Mexico			
Flashback	Edmonton	Alberta	Canada	1974	1991	
Fountainhead Pub	Vancouver, West End	British Columbia	Canada	2000		
Gold Coast	Chicago	Illinois	United States	1960	1988	One of the first bars created by and for the gay leather community in the United States.
Hobo's	Portland	Oregon	United States	c. 2002	2020	Restaurant, gay bar, and piano bar
Hunters Palm Springs	Palm Springs	California	United States	1998		
Jewel's Catch One	Los Angeles	California	United States	1973	2015	Longest running black gay dance bar in Los Angeles
Julius	New York City	New York	United States	c. 1867		Oldest continuously operating gay bar in New York City and site of the 1966 Julius Sip-In
The Junction	Vancouver, Davie Village	British Columbia	Canada	2010		
The Leather Stallion Saloon	Cleveland	Ohio	United States	1970		Oldest continuously operating gay bar in Ohio
Legends Nightclub	Raleigh, Warehouse District	North Carolina	United States	1991		One of the oldest LGBTQ bars in Raleigh
Le Stud	Montreal, Gay Village	Quebec	Canada	1996		
Madison Pub	Seattle	Washington	United States	1986		Gay sports bar
Mantamar Beach Club Bar & Sushi	Puerto Vallarta, Zona Romántica	Jalisco	Mexico	c. 2013		
Mineshaft	New York City	New York	United States	1976	1985	Was frequented by famous patrons including Jack Fritscher and Robert Mapplethorpe.
Missie B's	Kansas City	Missouri	United States	1994		
Neon Boots Dancehall & Saloon	Houston	Texas	United States	1955	1995	Largest LGBT country and western bar in Texas Opened in 1955 as Esquire Ballroom
Neon Boots Dancehall & Saloon	Houston	Texas	United States	2013		Largest LGBT country and western bar in Texas Opened in 1955 as Esquire Ballroom
Nicho Bears and Bar	Mexico City, Zona Rosa		Mexico			
Nob Hill	Washington, D.C.		United States	1953	2004	Began as a private club for Black gay and bisexual men but opened to the public in 1957.
La Noche	Puerto Vallarta, Zona Romántica	Jalisco	Mexico			
Numbers	Vancouver, Davie Village	British Columbia	Canada	c. 1980		
Paco's Ranch	Puerto Vallarta, Zona Romántica	Jalisco	Mexico			
The Paddock Club	Greenville	North Carolina	United States	1973	2003	At time of closing, oldest continuously operating LGBT club in North Carolina
Phase 1	Washington, D.C.		United States	1971	2016	One of the oldest continuously-operating women's bars at the time of its closure.
PickleBack 2	Durham	North Carolina	United States	2011		
The Pinhook	Durham	North Carolina	United States	2008		
Pumpjack Pub	Vancouver, Davie Village	Alberta	Canada	2000		
Pony	Seattle	Washington	United States			
Pulse	Orlando	Florida	United States	2004	2016	Site of the Pulse nightclub shooting
Purr Cocktail Lounge	Seattle	Washington	United States	2005	2018	
The Q	New York City	New York	United States	2021	2023	
Queer Bar	Seattle	Washington	United States	2017		
Ramrod	New York City	New York	United States	1960	1986	Known as the site of the 1980 West Street Massacre, a homophobic mass shooting.
Reinas Bar	Puerto Vallarta, Zona Romántica	Jalisco	Mexico	2010		
Red Cap Garage	Portland	Oregon	United States	1987	2012	One of three interconnected bars
San Francisco Eagle	San Francisco, South of Market	California	United States	1981		Formerly Eagle Tavern, a leather bar
Santé Bar	Portland	Oregon	United States			
The Saloon	Minneapolis	Minnesota	United States	1977		
Scandals	Portland	Oregon	United States	1979		Among Portland's longest-running LGBTQ+ bars
Silverado	Portland	Oregon	United States	2000s		Portland's only gay bar and strip club until the opening of Stag PDX
The Silver Platter	Los Angeles, Westlake	California	United States	1963		
South Beach	Houston	Texas	United States	2001		Voted Houston's Best Gay Bar
Stag PDX	Portland	Oregon	United States	2015		Second all-nude gay strip club on the West Coast, after Silverado
Stereo nightclub	Montreal	Quebec	Canada	1998		
Stonewall Inn	New York City	New York	United States	1930		Site of the 1969 Stonewall riots
The Stud	San Francisco	California	United States	1966		One of the first gay bars to open on Folsom Street.
This Is It!	Milwaukee	Wisconsin	United States	1968	2025	Prior to closing, oldest continually operating gay bar in Wisconsin
Three Sisters Tavern	Portland	Oregon	United States	1964	2004	Hub of Portland's gay nightlife
Toad Hall Bar	San Francisco, Castro District	California	United States	1971	1979	Featured in the movie Milk (2008), the bar reopened at a nearby location in 2009
Toad Hall Bar	San Francisco, Castro District	California	United States	2009		Featured in the movie Milk (2008), the bar reopened at a nearby location in 2009
The Tool Box	San Francisco, South of Market	California	United States	1962	1971	Leather bar
Twin Peaks Tavern	San Francisco, Castro District	California	United States	1935		
Union	Seattle	Washington	United States	2018		
White Horse Inn	Oakland	California	United States	1933		Said to be the oldest continuously operating gay bar in the United States
Woody's	Toronto	Ontario	Canada	1989		Featured in Queer as Folk
Ziegfeld's	Washington, D.C.		United States	1980	2006	Dual-themed nightclub with drag queens and male strippers. Closed in 2006 and reopened in a new location in 2009.
Ziegfeld's	Washington, D.C.		United States	2009	2020	Dual-themed nightclub with drag queens and male strippers. Closed in 2006 and reopened in a new location in 2009.

== South America ==
Bar	City	Country	Year opened	Year closed	Notes
Amerika	Buenos Aires	Argentina	2000		Largest LGBT nightclub in Buenos Aires
Nueva Cero	San Miguel	Chile	1998		Formerly known as Paradise, and Cero
Theatron	Bogotá	Colombia	2002		Complex of LGBT nightlife, the largest gay nightclub in Latin America
The Week International	São Paulo	Brazil	2004		

== See also ==
- List of lesbian bars
- List of gay bars called The Eagle
- List of leather bars
- Leather bars and clubs
- LGBTQ-owned business
