= Down Street (disambiguation) =

Down Street tube station is a disused London Underground station.

Down Street may also refer to:

- "Down Street" (The Architecture the Railways Built)
- "Down Street" (Neverwhere)
- "Down Street", a song by Steve Hackett from Wild Orchids, 2006

== See also ==
- Down the Street
- Downing Street
