= The Queen Adelaide (Bethnal Green) =

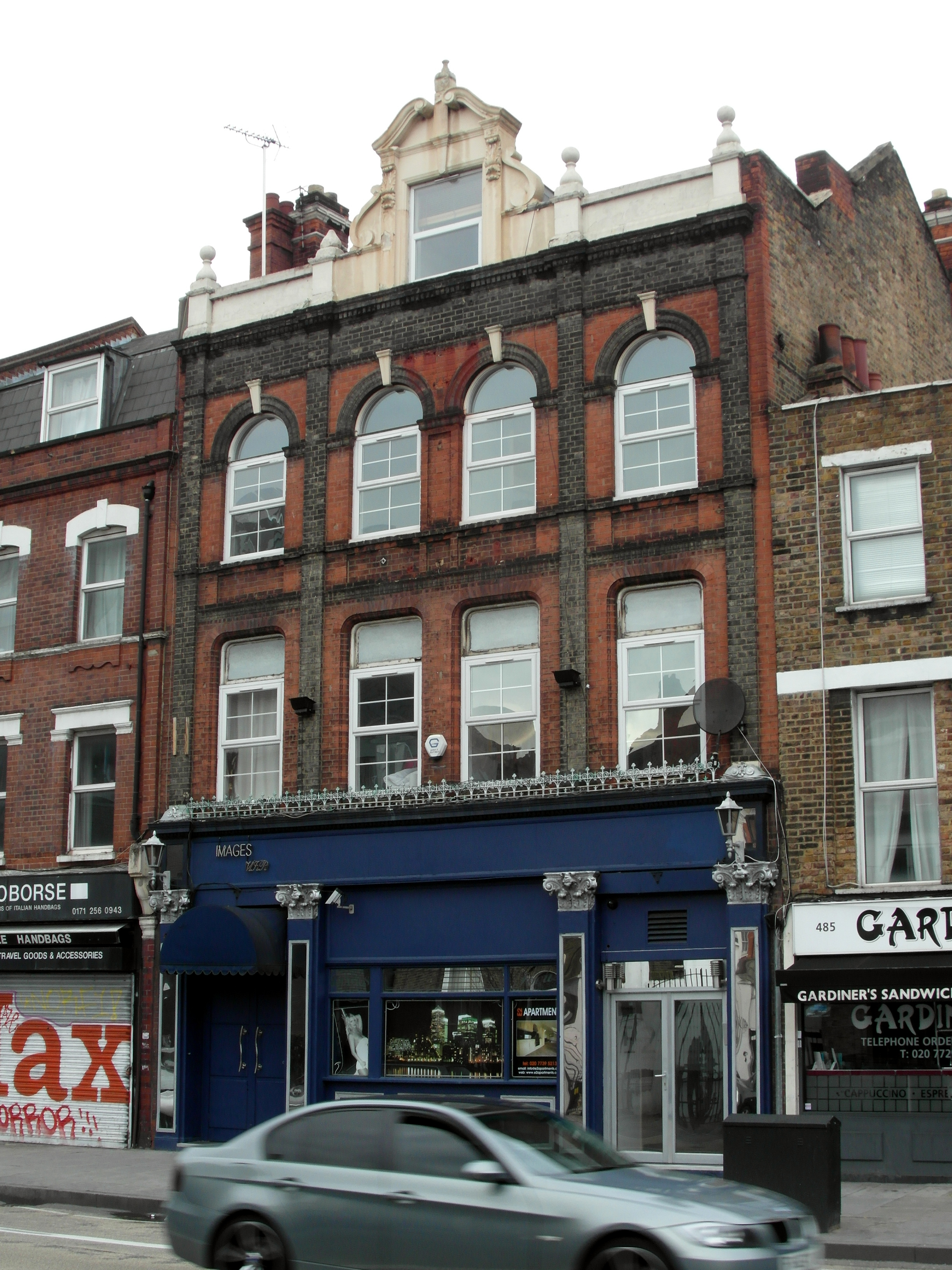
- The building in 2012
- Interactive map of The Queen Adelaide

Restaurant information
- Location: 483 Hackney Rd, London, England
- Coordinates: 51.5325°N 0.0584°W
- Website: www.thequeenadelaide.com

The Queen Adelaide is an LGBTQ+ pub and nightclub in Hackney, London. The pub has existed since at least 1834. Its current incarnation as an LGBTQ+ venue began in 2015 when the George and Dragon gay pub in Shoreditch closed, and the owners moved many of its furnishings to the Queen Adelaide venue on Hackney Road.

The pub's name changed to The Hop Picker by 1983, and was later Tantrums, Images, and Keelys before being renamed The Queen Adelaide.

In 2019 GQ Magazine described the venue as “the last survivor of a long dynasty of London gay bars”.

== See also ==
- List of LGBTQ bars
