= Commander D =

Gay bar in Taipei, Taiwan

- The bar's interior, 2024

Restaurant information
- Location: Taipei, Taiwan

Commander D is a gay bar in Taipei's Wanhua District, in Taiwan.

== Description ==
Interior (2024)

The leather bar Commander D operates in the Wanhua District and has a BDSM theme. The underground venue is accessible via a vault-like door. The interior has black walls, cages, chains, handcuffs, ropes, and "little secret corners", according to Lonely Planet. The guide book has also described Commender D as a "hot and steamy" popular dungeon club, with "frequent live acts". Grindr has said, "Tucked away on a second floor, it's surprisingly easy to miss – until you're inside and greeted by a harness-clad bartender and walls adorned with kinky art." Passport Magazine has called Commander D a "darkly lit basement bar with a backroom (as well as an ingenious locker system where you can leave valuables before heading into the darkness)".

The bar has hosted fetish and kink events. Grindr has said of the clientele: "The crowd here ranges from curious newbies (nervously sipping beer) to leather daddies proudly flaunting their gear."

== History ==
Commander D is Taipei's "first and only BDSM-themed gay bar", according to Grindr.

In 2026, police raided the venue and reportedly made discriminatory comments at people with disabilities. Of 58 people in the bar at the time, 51 were cited for public nudity and indecent behavior under the Social Order Maintenance Act. The actions by authorities prompted community protest. Four officers were reprimanded for comments made during the raid.

== Reception ==
In its 2025 "ultimate gay travel guide to Taipei", Grindr recommended Commander D "for something a little spicier" and said: "It's friendly, it's wild, and it's definitely a story to take home." Passport Magazine has recommended the bar for gay men seeking "a more scandalous night out".

== See also ==
- BDSM in culture and media
- LGBTQ history in Taiwan
- LGBTQ rights in Taiwan
- List of LGBTQ bars
