= Atlantic House =

Historical gay bar in Massachusetts USA

Coordinates: 42°03′26″N 70°11′04″W

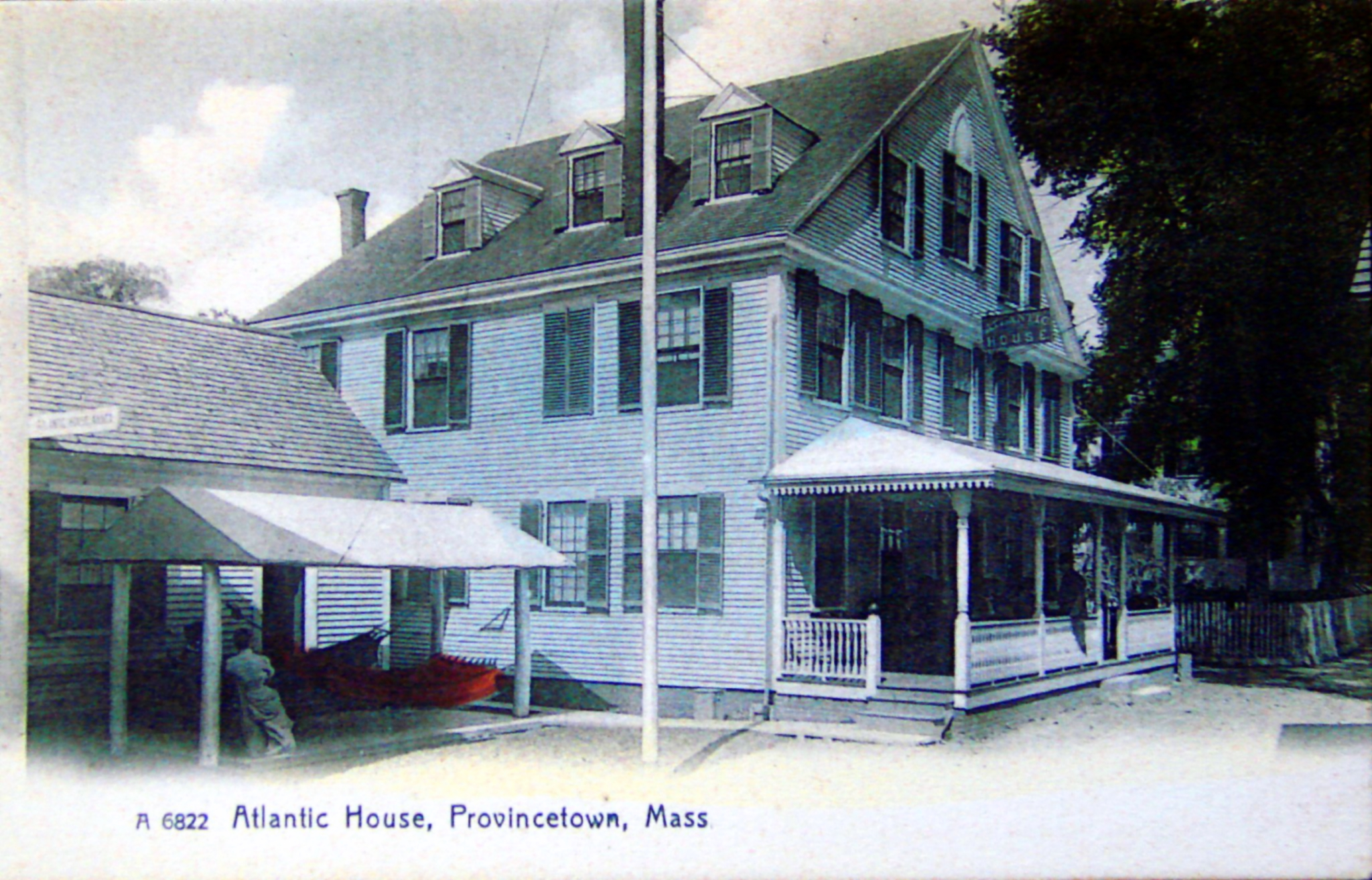
The Atlantic House; postcard circa 1905

The Atlantic House (often called the A-House, even in its own advertisements) in Provincetown, Massachusetts is a drinking establishment that has been in continual operation on the tip of Cape Cod for over two centuries.

Having been an openly gay-friendly establishment for half a century, the Atlantic House is a contender for the oldest gay bar in the United States. Frommer's calls it "the nation's premier gay bar".

== Early history ==
The oldest part of the building (now the left wing) was constructed in 1798 by Daniel Pease, Provincetown's first postmaster. Pease operated the building as a tavern, but the name of the establishment at this time, if it had one, is uncertain. After Pease's death from cholera in 1834, the business was purchased by Benjamin Allstrum and became known as the Allstrum House. It served as the last stagecoach stop of the Orleans to Provincetown route until the arrival of the train in 1873.

When Allstrum died in 1871, Frank Potter Smith, a Portuguese sailor who had arrived in town by sea at the age of 18, bought the Allstrum House. At some point, the original structure was joined with a larger adjacent structure that was fitted with guest rooms. Smith renamed the business the Atlantic House Hotel, and it has been called the Atlantic House since.

== 20th century ==
In the early 20th century, as the whaling industry that had been Provincetown's lifeblood since its foundation decreased in importance, the area became a mecca for artists and writers. As events leading up to World War I made overseas travel hazardous, the Bohemian lifestyle took strong hold in Provincetown and Atlantic House became a center for their social activity.

In 1917, after the United States entered World War I, Reuben Kelly, a member of the Masonic Lodge next door, arrested two alleged spies at gun point in the dining room of Atlantic House Hotel: playwright Eugene O'Neill (who had recently won a Pulitzer Prize) and his author friend Harold de Polo. Suspicions centered on a black box the men had carried out to the dunes near a government radio station in Truro. Rather than containing apparatus for signaling the Kaiser's forces, the box was found to contain a Smith Corona typewriter.

A plaque on the exterior of the Atlantic House today commemorates the time that O'Neill spent here during the 1910s and 1920s and notes that part of The Iceman Cometh was written during his stay. The Atlantic House was a hangout for other literati of the period. Tennessee Williams, can be seen in photos that now hang in the bar in which he cavorts nude with male friends on the beach.

In 1950, Reginald "Reggie" Cabral and Mr. and Mrs. Frank J. Hurst bought the A-House. Cabral, who worked as manager, soon took over full ownership and made the long discreetly gay friendly establishment openly so. Cabral, a collector of art, graced the establishment with such decorative accents as a carved wooden figurehead said to come from the last whaling ship to operate out of Provincetown Harbor and signed works by Andy Warhol and Keith Haring.

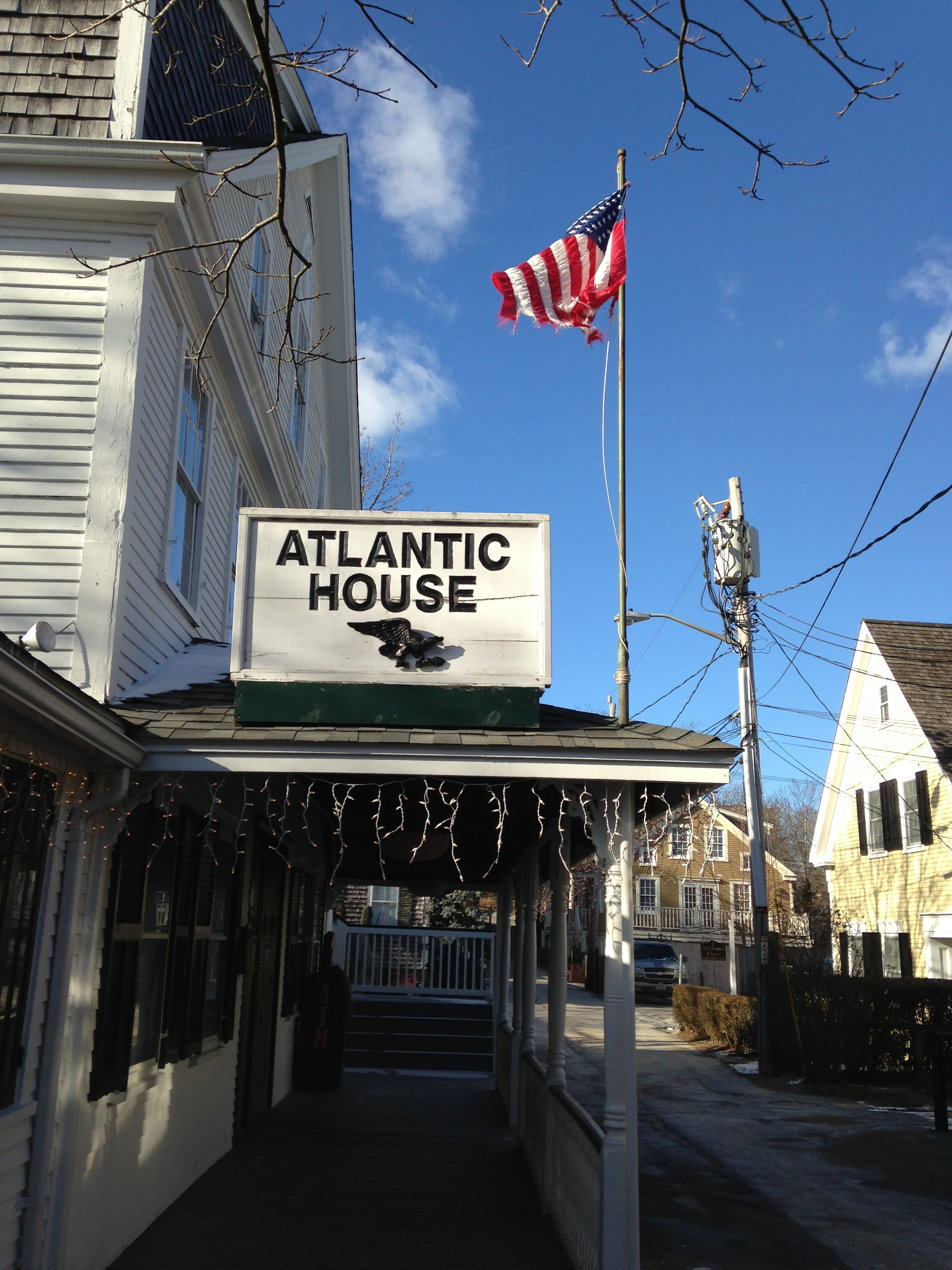
The A-House today

== Layout ==
For the past several decades the property has consisted of five parts. There is the original tavern, now known as the Little Bar, an intimate space with a fireplace and jukebox. Upstairs from it is the Macho Bar, a space primarily for leather men and decorated accordingly with IML posters, Tom of Finland images, etc. In the larger wing, the ground level is a nightclub with dancefloor. The area upstairs from this, once hotel rooms, has mostly been (and is currently) used only for storage. A small building directly across Masonic Place (the short, pedestrian way on Commercial Street where the A-House is located) was long used as a storage space but is now a restaurant called Grand Central. In the 1990s, a sixth area was added, an enclosed exterior area in back and to the right of the large building which greatly expanded the nightclub's capacity.

One reviewer wrote:

even with the competition the A-House draws in the most boys to dance on its small dance floor and to hang out on the large outdoor patio. During the summer months, you can't go wrong by choosing the A-House to dance.

In addition to whatever other elements are present, most areas of the Atlantic House convey a "nautical feel" through decorative elements such as harpoons and oars attached to the ceiling.

== See also ==
- List of LGBTQ bars
