= The WayOut Club =

Coordinates: 51°30′42″N 0°4′35.5″W

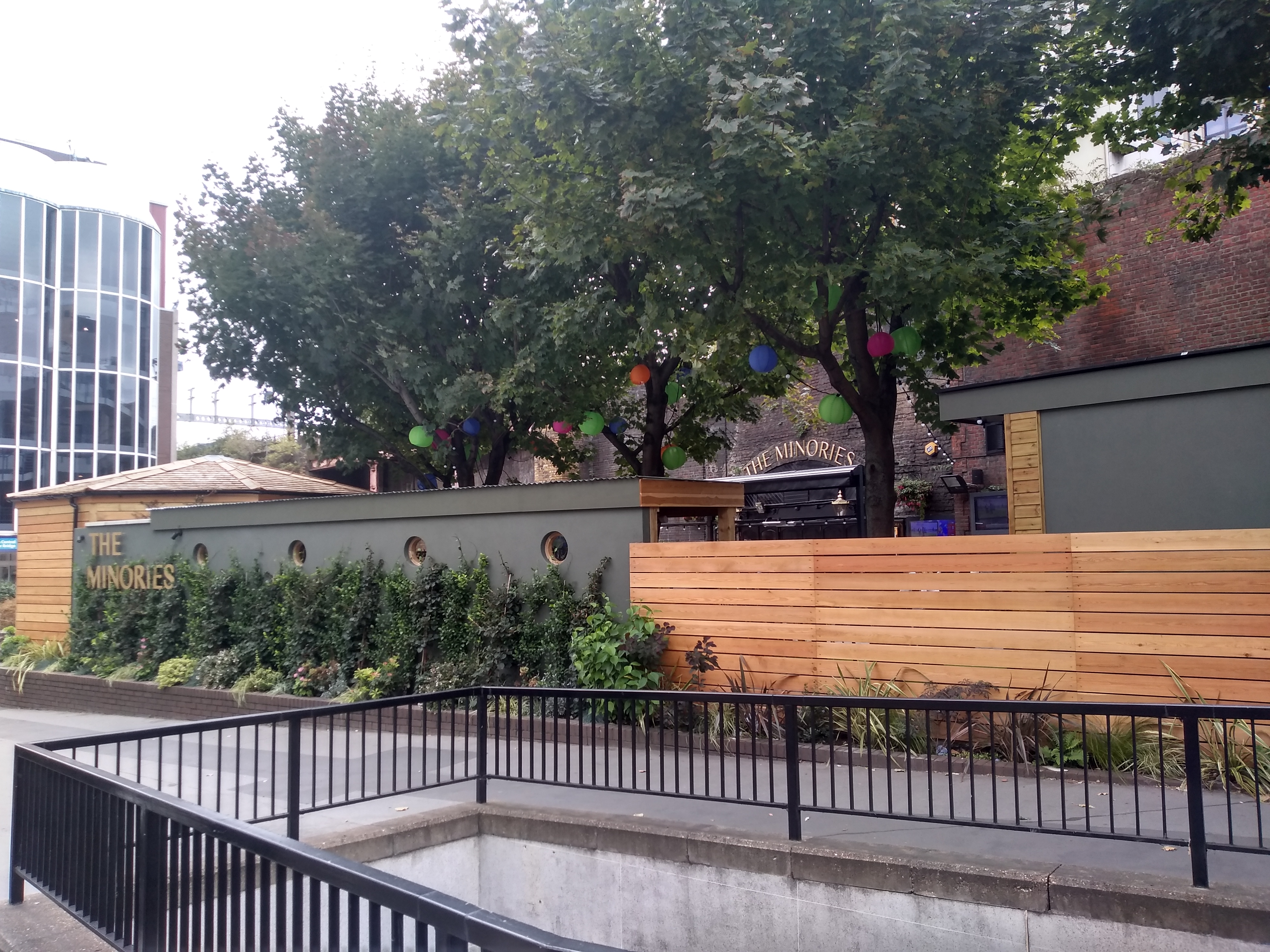
- The White Swan
- Industry: Nightclub
- Founded: 1993; 33 years ago London, England
- Key people: Vicky Lee and Steffan Whitfield/DJ)
- Website: www.thewayoutclub.com/

The WayOut Club is a nightclub venue currently in Zodiac Bar, 119 Hampstead Rd, London NW1 3EE. Formed in 1993, it is one of London's best known transgender venues and was the first to hold a regular Saturday night event.

== History ==
The WayOut Club was founded in 1993 by Vicky Lee and Steffan Whitfield. Its first venue was Jamisons in Goodge Street; after a year it moved to Maceys in Duke Street, and then to a restaurant under the Scotch House in Knightsbridge. It also used Circa in Berkley Square, had a short spell in a restaurant in Great Titchfield Street, and a shorter spell under the theatre showing Cats in Drury Lane.

The club moved from venue to venue around the City of London several times before settling at Charlie's in Crosswall (off Minories) in the City of London in 1998, where it remained for 15 years. In 2008 the club won an online people's vote award from transgender charity Sparkle for "Best Transgender Nightclub". In June 2012 Charlie's lease ran out and had to close, and the club moved around the corner to 2AD and then to Abbey in Minories. Abbey gave up its Saturday late licence and Vicky Lee took the club to Gilt in Crutched Friars. Gilt changed ownership and closed for refurbishment, forcing the club to move again, this time to two venues: The Minories for three Saturdays per month and Mary Janes for one Saturday per month, both in Minories. Mary Janes was taken over and refurbished, so the club moved into The Minories every Saturday. These frequent relocations stopped in 2016, and The WayOut Club remained at The Minories for seven years. Occasionally, to help The Minories, the club would use nearby "sister bar" The Duke of Somerset. The club closed on 23 March 2020 due to the COVID-19 pandemic, and did not reopen until November 2021, with a record 450 people returning to party. The club operated on the second and last Saturday as visitors gradually returned after the pandemic.

However, in September 2022, Stonegate, owners of The Minories, changed their policy towards promoters, and Vicky Lee quit and moved the club to BJs White Swan at 556 Commercial Road, accepting the offer of one Saturday per month. The club has been rebuilding since with a once-a-month club on the third Saturday of every month.

The WayOut Club's performances were led by female impersonator Steffan Whitfield, until his death from cancer in 2005. His stage partner and co-founder of the club, trans woman Vicky Lee, took over running the club.

The WayOut Club has long been a launch platform for transgender and drag talent. The club has held talent searches and offers a guest spot before the booked show to upcoming performers. Many of those that have performed as guests at the club have gone on to perform regularly at WayOut and other venues.

In 2022 Basque film director Izaskun Arandia premiered her documentary My Way Out, telling the story of The WayOut Club featuring Vicky Lee, her partner Lesley and club regulars Geri Love, Andi and Kam Angel. The documentary documents the impact on the club of the COVID-19 pandemic, its shut down, re-launch and efforts to rebuild.

== See also ==
- List of LGBTQ bars
