= Nueva Cero =

Nueva Cero (formerly known as Paradise) is an LGBT nightclub located in the commune of San Miguel, in Santiago de Chile.

== History ==
The venue originally housed the San Miguel Theater, located at 1204 Euclides Street—formerly called “Central Avenue”— and built in the 1920s. In the following decades, it hosted various cultural events and operated as a cinema until the 1980s.

After its closure as a cinema, in 1981 the venue became the Sala Lautaro, also known as “Gimnasio Lautaro” or “Sala Euclides”, and hosted concerts by various musical groups during the 1980s and early 1990s, particularly rock bands such as Amapola and Tumulto, or thrash metal bands like Massacre and Warpath, and death metal bands like Torturer, Sadism, Death Yell, Darkness, Abhorrent, and Atomic Aggressor. Sala Lautaro closed its doors around September 1991.

In the early 1990s, the venue housed the nightclub Paradise, primarily aimed at a gay audience and featuring drag queen shows, such as performances by Maureen Junott and Kassandra Romanini. The venue was later operated by Sarquis y Meza Limitada, who in 1998 founded the nightclub Cero, which in subsequent years became known as Nueva Cero.

Among the shows held at Nueva Cero is Reinas de la Noche, with backstage hosted by Janin Day between 2016 and 2018, and the beauty contest Miss Nueva Cero. Nueva Cero has also hosted qualifying events and the final of Mister Gay Chile, and has participated in the Santiago LGBT Pride March.

== See also ==
- List of LGBTQ bars
