= Amerika (nightclub) =

LGBT nightclub in Argentina

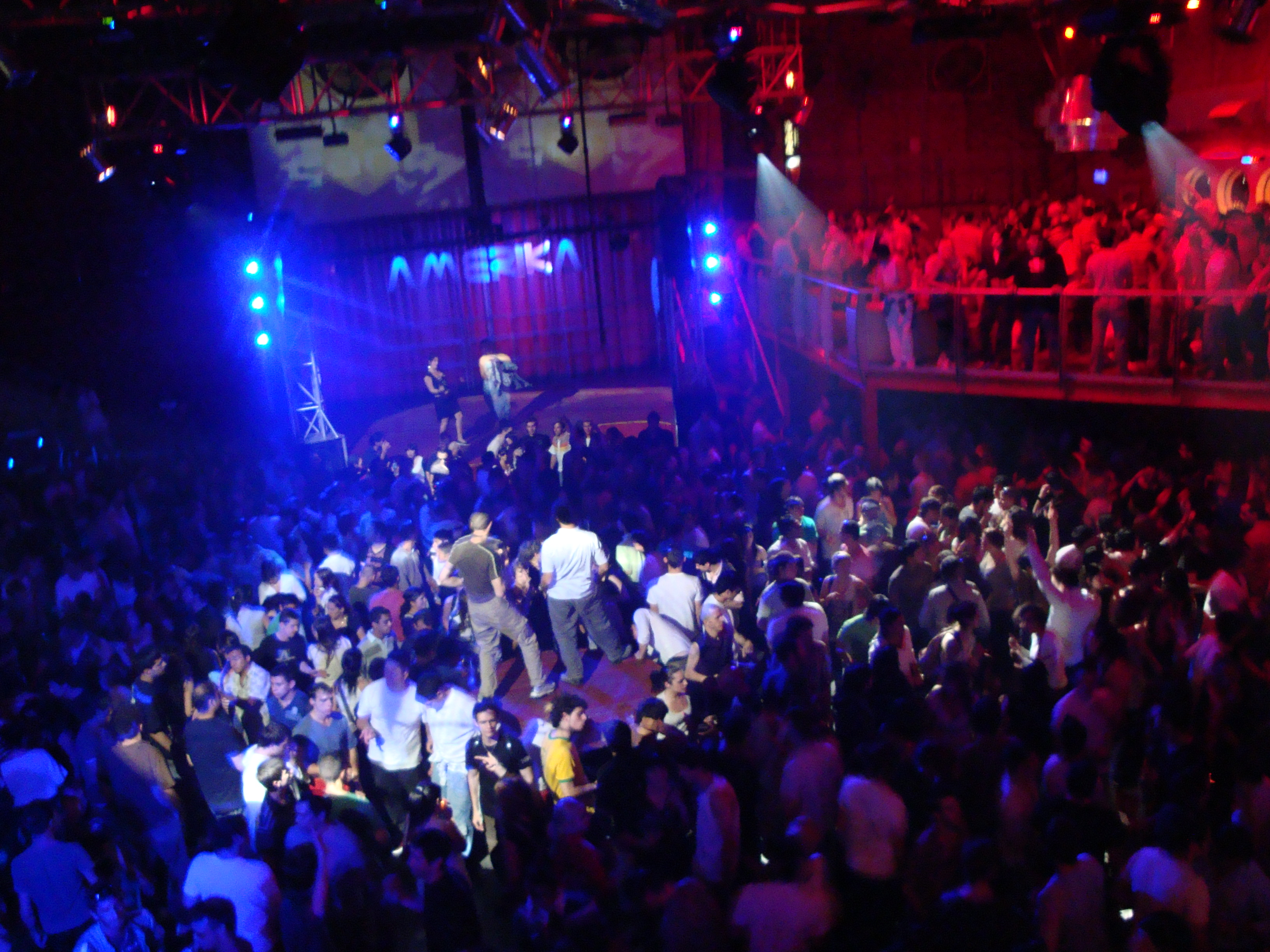
Principal dance floor in Amerika

Amerika is an Argentine LGBT nightclub, the largest in Buenos Aires. It is located in the Almagro neighborhood and is one of the most popular LGBT discos in Buenos Aires.

Amerika has, on several occasions been closed due to noise complaints from neighborhood residents, however, the owners claim it is discrimination on the part of its neighbors.

The Comunidad Homosexual Argentina, an association that defends LGBT rights, was involved in the reopening of the club in December 2006 after it had been closed for five months.

== Location ==
Amerika is located on 1040 Gascón Street, in the neighborhood of Almagro, Buenos Aires. It has three dance floors: Continental, Caribbean and Crystal and has capacity for 1866 people. It works only on Thursdays, Fridays, Saturdays and Sundays.

== See also ==
- List of LGBTQ bars
