= Black Banana =

Defunct nightclub in Philadelphia, Pennsylvania, U.S.

The Black Banana
- La Banane Noire
- Interactive map of The Black Banana
- Former names: La Banane Noire
- Address: 534 South 4th Street (original); 3rd and Race Streets (later)
- Location: Philadelphia, Pennsylvania, U.S.
- Coordinates: 39.95389°N 75.14496°W
- Type: Restaurant, then private nightclub

Construction
- Opened: 1971

The Black Banana (originally La Banane Noire) was a nightclub in Philadelphia, Pennsylvania. It began in 1971 as an ice cream parlor and restaurant near South Street and later reinvented itself as a members-only club in Old City, where it was known in the 1980s and early 1990s for its mixed gay and straight crowd and European-style dance music.

== History ==
=== La Banane Noire ===
The business opened in 1971 as La Banane Noire, an ice cream parlor and restaurant at 534 South 4th Street, just off South Street.

=== The Black Banana ===
The owners later moved the business to the corner of 3rd and Race Streets in Old City and turned it into the Black Banana, a private nightclub open only to members and their guests. The owners, Garrick, an American, and his French-born partner Xavier, set out to recreate European nightlife in Philadelphia, and the club became known for cabaret shows, video screens and frequently changing themes. Garrick died in 1991.

== Music and clientele ==
The club played electronic music, Euro disco and French dance music. Its DJs included Nicholas and Gigi Meoli, whose "Vagabond" party was one of its best-known nights, as well as Nick London, Robbie Tronco and Josh Wink. Wink, who began playing there around 1989, described it as one of the city's three after-hours clubs and "a mixed place—socially, sexually, every way".

Its membership mixed gay and straight patrons, artists, models and club kids, and the lesbian social group Ladies of the 80's held its events there. London also recalled a visit by Prince, whose staff had an area of the club roped off for him.

== Legacy ==
The Black Banana is remembered among the venues that shaped Philadelphia's gay club scene in the 1980s, and several figures in later Philadelphia nightlife started there. Former staff and DJs held a reunion in January 2011.

== See also ==
- Catacombs Nightclub Philadelphia
- LGBTQ culture in Philadelphia
- List of LGBTQ bars
