= Le Queen =

Nightclub in Paris, France

Coordinates: 48°52′18.8″N 02°18′06.8″E

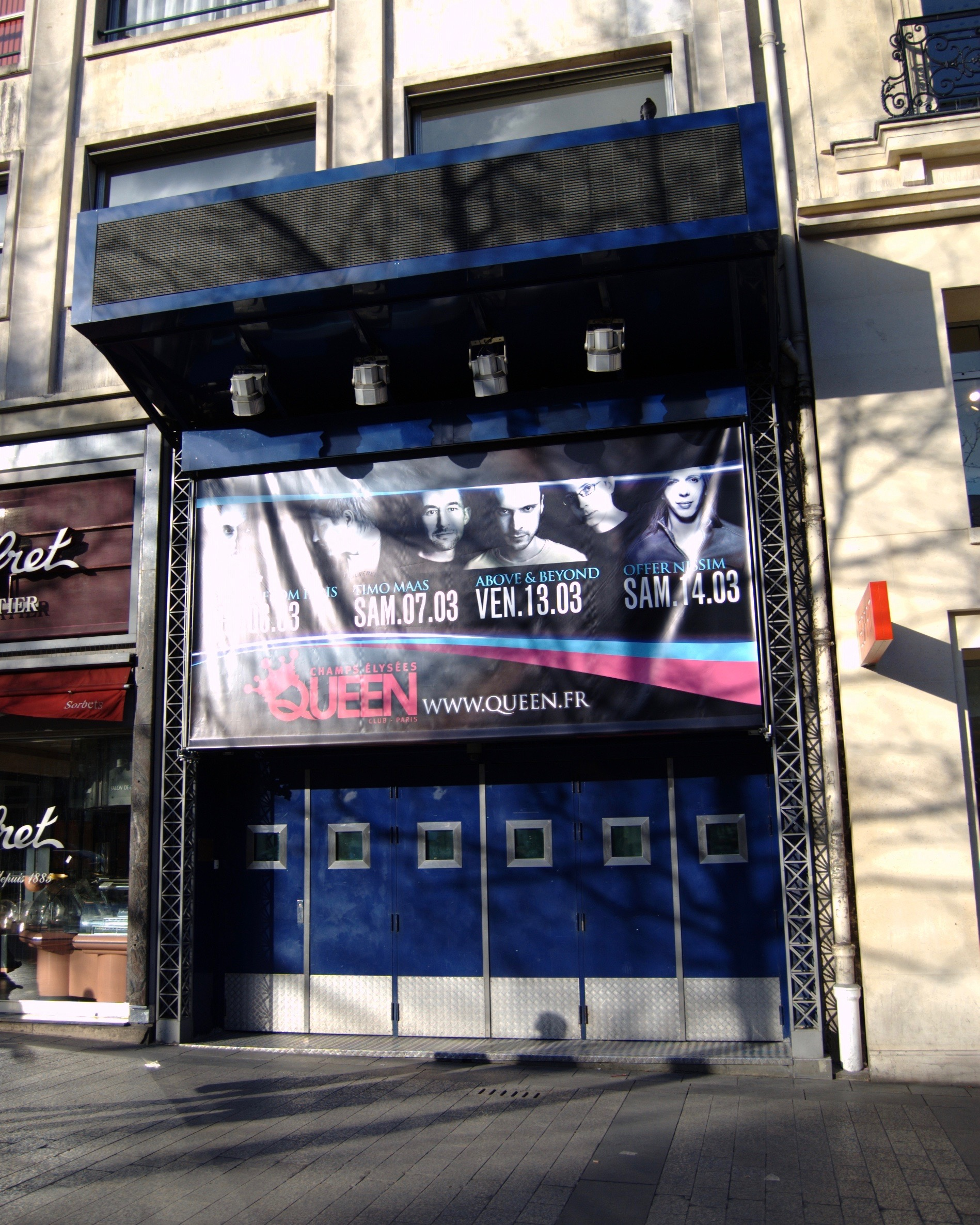
Entrance

Le Queen was a nightclub in Paris, located on the avenue des Champs-Élysées.

Once a gay nightclub, Le Queen was formerly known as "Le Central" until its closing in early 1991. It was more or less the sequel to the Parisian club "Le Boy", as it was owned by the same person.

The original "Directeur Artistique" was David Guetta. DJs at that time (1993–95) included Guetta, Rony, Claude Monnet as well as many guest DJs such as Laurent Garnier, Derrick May, Sasha and many more. DJ Dimitri from Paris helped popularize the club with a weekly club-night called Paris is Burning, which opened Le Queen up to a substantial heterosexual following, changing it from a gay club to a mega club.

Previous resident DJs included Offer Nissim, Paul Van Dyk, Joel Lovenski, Deep Dish, Lucy, KFK, and Michael Kaiser.

== See also ==
- List of electronic dance music venues
- List of LGBTQ bars
