= The Silver Platter (gay bar) =

Gay bar located in Los Angeles

- Interactive map of The Silver Platter
- Former names: The Silver Platter Grille
- Address: 2700 West 7th St. Westlake, Los Angeles, California; United States
- Coordinates: 34°03′33″N 118°17′01″W
- Owner: Margarita Xatruch

Construction
- Opened: 1963; 63 years ago

The Silver Platter is a gay bar located in the Westlake neighborhood of Los Angeles. It is the area's oldest gay bar, dating to 1963.

== History ==
The Silver Platter was founded in 1963 in a building dating to 1922, designed by F.M. Cummings. The establishment started as the Silver Platter Grille in 1931 and went by various names throughout the years before transitioning from restaurant to bar and formally becoming The Silver Platter. In 1988, the bar helped sponsor the Lavender Left demonstration against police harassment.

The bar caters to Latinx, LGBTQ+, and working-class Angelenos. In the early 1990s, after owner Rogelio Ramirez died of AIDS and left the bar to his brother, the bar formed a cross-dressing and, later, transgender clientele. In an off-color 2008 review, LA Weekly named the Silver Platter “best tranny bar in Los Angeles," sparking an outcry amongst its patrons who felt their safe space had been violated.

In 2010, Gonzalo Ramirez, owner of The Silver Platter at the time, died. An ownership dispute ensued between Ramirez's ex-boyfriend and his sister.

During the first 18 months of the COVID-19 pandemic, the bar closed.

In 2020, the property owner of the Silver Platter building submitted plans to construct a new seven-story, 55-unit mixed-use apartment complex on the site of the bar. However, the bar owners and the public only learned about the project in 2024 when a demolition sign was posted on the building. Though the property owner claims the building has no historical significance, a 2008 city survey found that the Silver Platter building “appears eligible for the National Register, California Register, and as an L.A. Historic Cultural Monument because it is one of a limited number of intact commercial buildings constructed during the period of significance and appears to meet the eligibility standards prepared in the Westlake CRA Survey Historic Context Statement.”

In 2025, the Los Angeles Conservancy and the Silver Platter nominated the site as an Endangered Latinx Landmark, and on September 9, 2025, Latinos in Heritage Conservation (LHC) placed the bar on the first-ever national list of Endangered Latinx Landmarks.

== In media ==
- A 2012 film, Wildness, by Wu Tsang, documents the history of The Silver Platter.

== See also ==
- List of LGBTQ bars
