= The Paddock Club =

LGBTQ nightclub in Greenville, North Carolina

Coordinates: 35.608499°N 77.380679°W

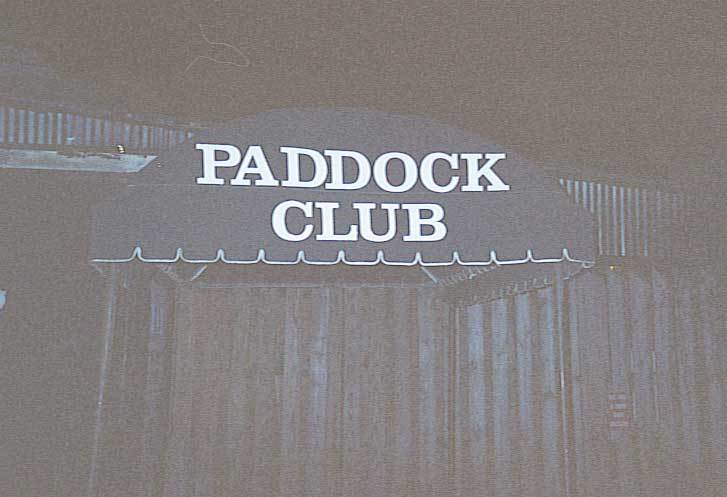
- Interactive map of The Paddock Club
- Address: 1008-B Dickinson Avenue; Greenville, North Carolina; United States
- Owner: Bill Brock
- Operator: Glen Haddock
- Type: Gay club

Construction
- Opened: June 1973
- Closed: December 23, 2003

The Paddock Club was a dance/night club located at 1008-B Dickinson Avenue in Greenville, North Carolina, that catered primarily to the gay and lesbian community of Greenville and all of Eastern North Carolina. The club was in operation for 30 years and 6 months from June 1973 until December 23, 2003 and was, at the time it closed, the oldest continuously operating LGBT club in the state. After the December 2003 closing, the club reopened for one night for a final farewell party on January 31, 2004.

The Paddock Club, founded by Bill Brock, was originally a Country Western nightclub. In 1973, Brock decided to turn it into a gay club. At that time there were no places east of Raleigh for the LGBT community to gather socially without fear. The first night after the change, Brock greeted his members at the door and told them The Paddock was now a gay club and that he would be glad to refund their membership fees if they were no longer interested in coming to the club. Many accepted his offer, a few did not.

The Paddock encompassed approximately 5,000 square feet (460 m^{2}) including the main club room where the dance floor and stage was located, a mezzanine level overlooking the approx. 30 ft (9.1 m) wide stage, a large pool room which doubled as a back stage area, an outdoor patio area, a full kitchen, DJ booth, storage and office areas.

The Paddock Club was the birthplace of the Miss Gay North Carolina America Pageant, which is an official preliminary to the Miss Gay America Pageant. Also born at The Paddock Club was the Miss Greenville Pageant, a preliminary pageant to Miss Gay North Carolina Pageant. After Miss Gay North Carolina was sold to new promoters, Miss Greenville remained a yearly event at the Paddock Club for 25 years.

As a gay club, it was a surprise when in 2002 Playboy chose the club as "best place to meet chicks". Friday nights' drag shows drew a large number of heterosexual men, making it a good night to mix.

In December 2003, Brock decided to close the club. The end of a multi-year lease was approaching and by this time Brock was in declining health. The opening of a new gay club in town had also hurt business. On December 26, 2003, Glen Haddock, club manager, made the announcement that it was the last night the club would be open.

The doors opened one more time for a final farewell extravaganza on January 31, 2004. The club was filled to capacity and former bar staff, patrons, and friends all gathered to say goodbye. The bartenders poured out the remaining bar stock throughout the evening free of charge and the entertainers performed while a slide show of images from over the years was projected on the club's screen under the mezzanine.

A huge "Farewell to Dickinson Avenue" party was held at Limelight Nightclub (in the former Paddock Building) on September 30, 2013. People from the entire history of the club location back to 1973 were in attendance. In October 2013 the former Paddock Club building at 1008-B Dickinson Avenue was demolished by the State of North Carolina to make way for the 10th Street Connector road project which now runs directly over the rear right portion of the former site of the building.

In the summer of 2014 production wrapped up on a feature-length documentary about The Paddock Club entitled: "Dickinson Avenue, The {mostly} True Story of The Paddock Club." The documentary is now available on Blu-Ray disc at www.dickinsonavenuemovie.com

Commemorating the space and the people that made The Paddock Club an indelible part of history, a memorial created from the original steel spiral staircase from the club proudly stands at 1010 Dickinson Avenue and was dedicated on June 29, 2024.

== See also ==
- List of LGBTQ bars
