= Missie B's =

Gay bar in Kansas City, Missouri, U.S.

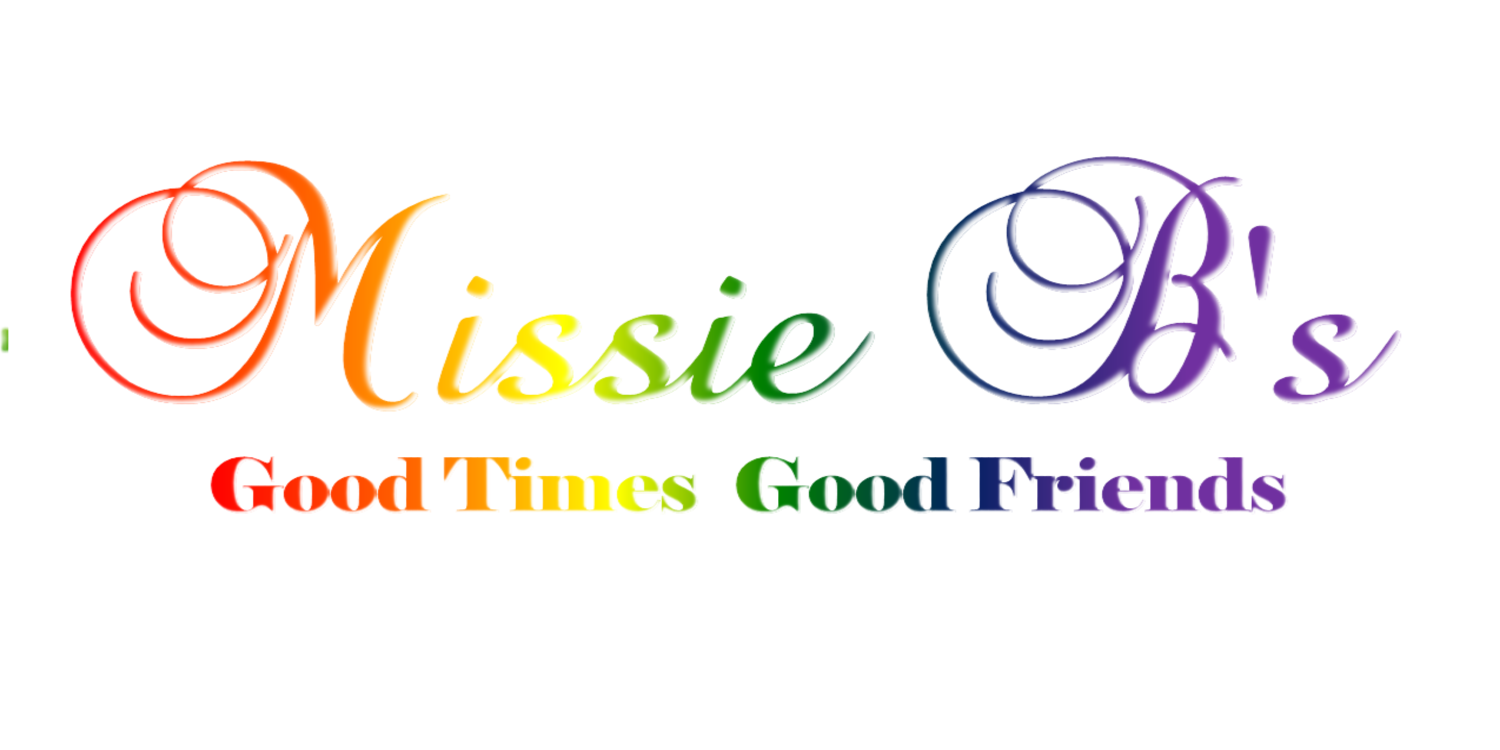
- Interactive map of Missie B's
- Address: 805 West 39th Street; Westport, Kansas City, Missouri; United States
- Coordinates: 39.056767°N 94.595997°W

Construction
- Opened: April 1994; 32 years ago
- Renovated: 2020

Website
- missiebs.com

Missie B's is a gay bar and nightclub located in the Westport district of Kansas City, Missouri. Established in April 1994, the venue is a site for drag shows and community events.

== Description ==
The nightclub is a two-story complex. The lower level contains the main bar, seating area, pool table, darts, and a theater and main stage used for nightly drag shows and "bar theater". The first floor also contains a semi-enclosed heated outdoor bar and patio area. The second story has an additional bar, seating area, and a second dance floor with music video screens. The second floor also houses a leather and fetish shop and a trophy case for the Kansas City Pioneers, a leather subculture service organization.

== History ==
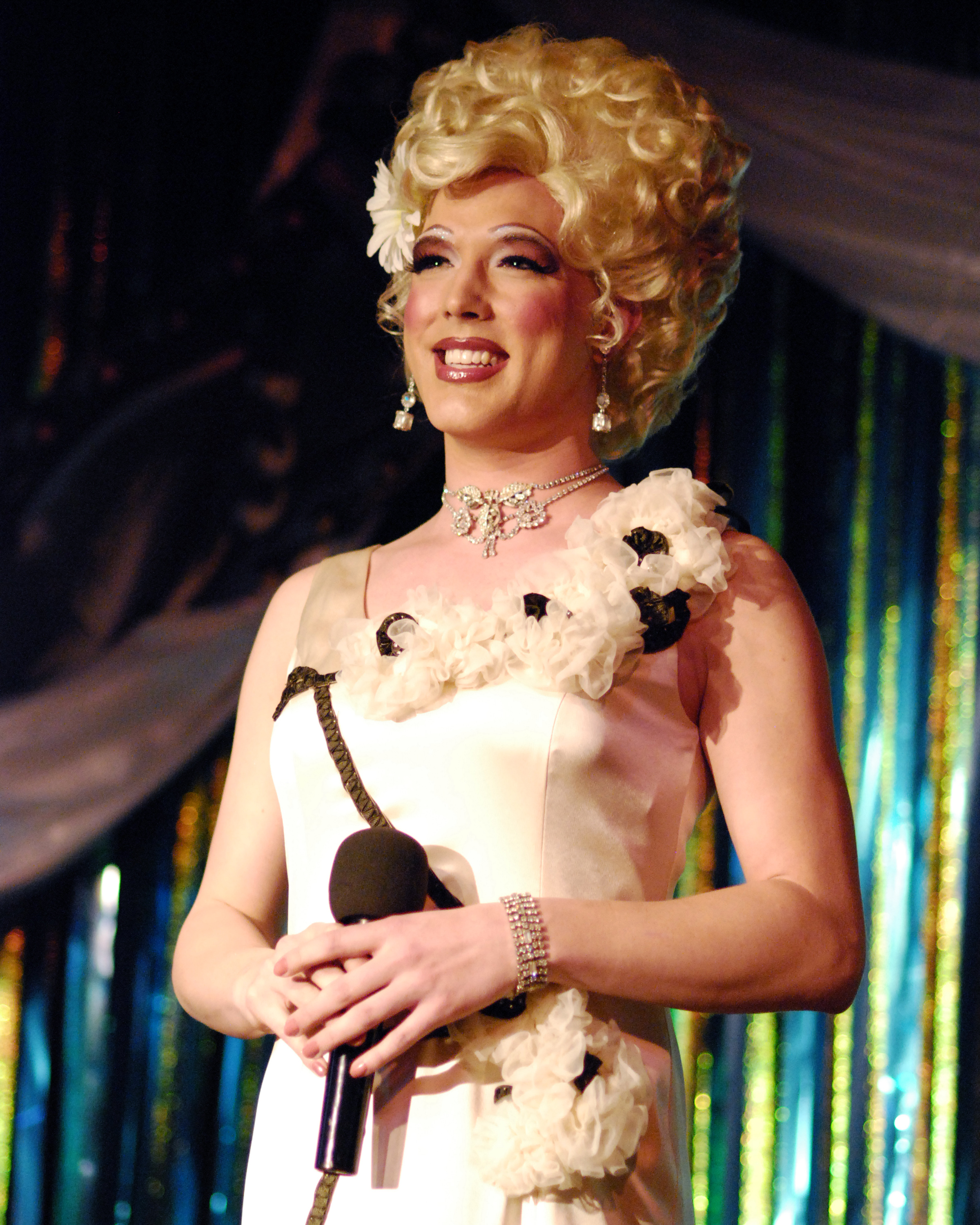
A drag queen performing on stage at Missie B's in 2008

The bar was founded in 1994 by Michael Burnes, a Vietnam War veteran who previously operated several other bars in the area, including Mike's Kitchen and The Dixie Bell. The name is a play on Burnes's nickname of "Missie's Missing," which he received due to his habit of going "missing" when out drinking. While it originally began as a piano and karaoke bar, the bar has expanded over four times its original size over the decades by acquiring adjacent spaces.

In 1999, the bar was involved in a criminal case regarding J.D. O'Neal, a local publisher. O'Neal was investigated for burglarizing the establishment's safes and stealing the identities of Burnes and employee Buddy Taylor to open fraudulent credit accounts. O'Neal pleaded guilty to state felony charges in 2000 and died by suicide in November 2001 following a federal indictment for credit card fraud.

The bar is open 365 days a year and has hosted a free potluck holiday meal service on Thanksgiving and Christmas for several decades, a tradition Burnes started before opening the bar to serve individuals who were rejected or otherwise lacking family during holidays. In 2016, following the Pulse nightclub shooting, the venue reported raising $54,000 for victim funds through community donations and merchandise sales. Missie B's also held a fundraiser for the victims of the 2022 shooting at Club Q in Colorado Springs.

It underwent a complete renovation in mid-2020 during a shutdown due to the COVID-19 pandemic.

== See also ==
- List of LGBTQ bars
