= The Joiners Arms =

East London LGBT pub and nightclub

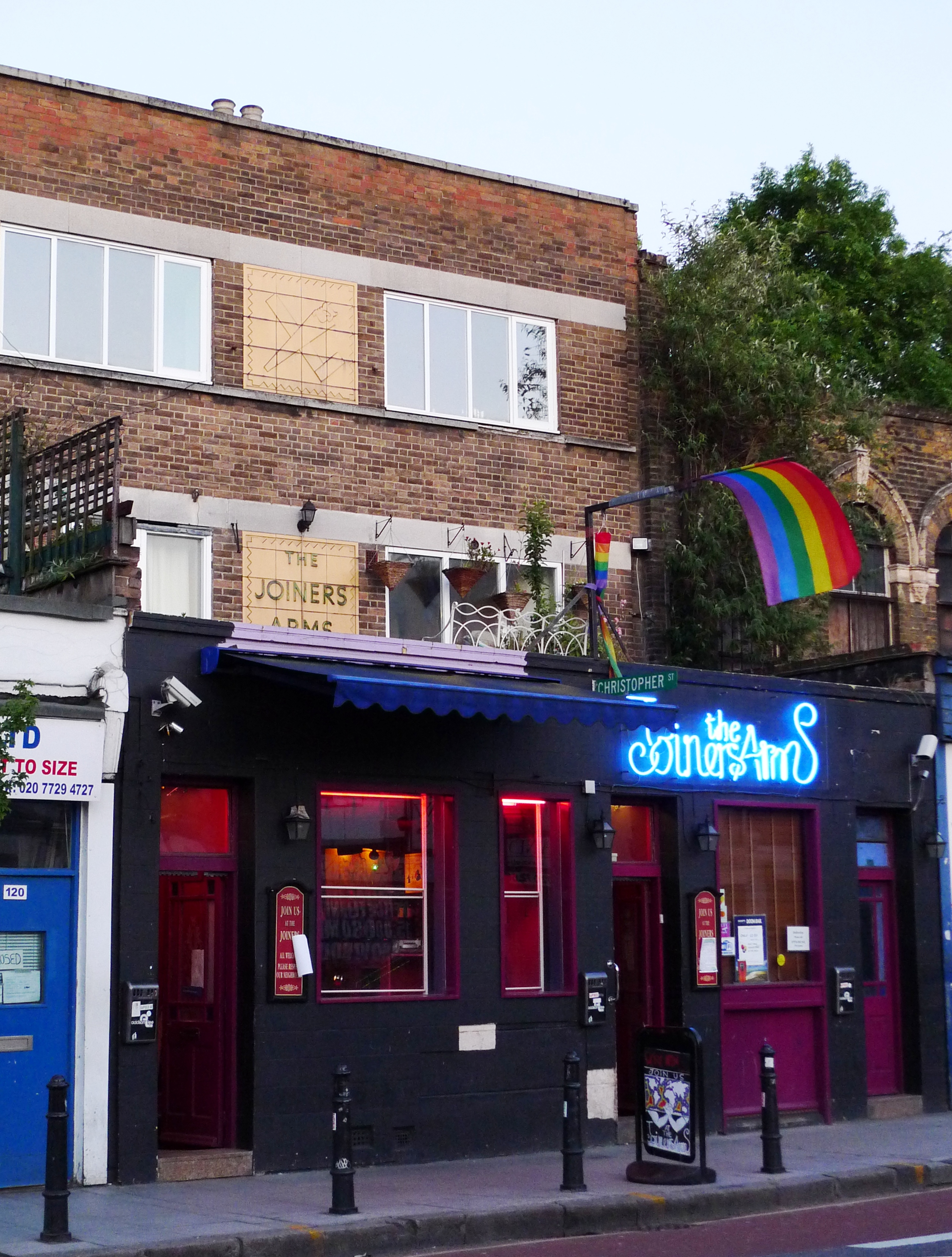
- Joiners' Arms

- Location within London Borough of Tower Hamlets Location within Greater London

General information
- Location: 116-118 Hackney Road, London, E2 7QL, England
- Coordinates: 51°31′47″N 0°04′29″W
- Opened: 1997
- Closed: 2015

The Joiners Arms was an LGBT pub and nightclub on Hackney Road in East London.

The original pub, which closed in 2015, had been central to the East London gay scene since it was opened in 1997 by David Alexander Pollard. It had been described as "Britain's trendiest gay dive" with gay public figures including Alexander McQueen, Christopher Kane and Patrick Wolf dropping in, and with events hosted by gay entertainers Scottee and Jodie Harsh. The venue had been open to a range of gay subcultures such as the bear scene and drag queens. Due to its late night opening and free entry, the Joiners Arms had a reputation for being a "last chance saloon" and sometimes having a rough crowd, but this has also been described as part of its appeal.

Plans were announced in 2014 to demolish the venue and replace it with a block of flats, but supporters of the venue successfully campaigned to have it recognised as an Asset of Community Value. Tower Hamlets Council only allowed the construction to proceed if the development included a pub that would "remain a lesbian, gay, bisexual and transgender-focused venue for a minimum of 12 years". This was believed to be the first time that the sexual orientation of a venue's customers had been included as a condition of planning approval.

== See also ==
- List of LGBTQ bars
