= Gateway District (Minneapolis) =

Human settlement in Minneapolis, Minnesota, US

Coordinates: 44°58′56″N 93°16′6″W

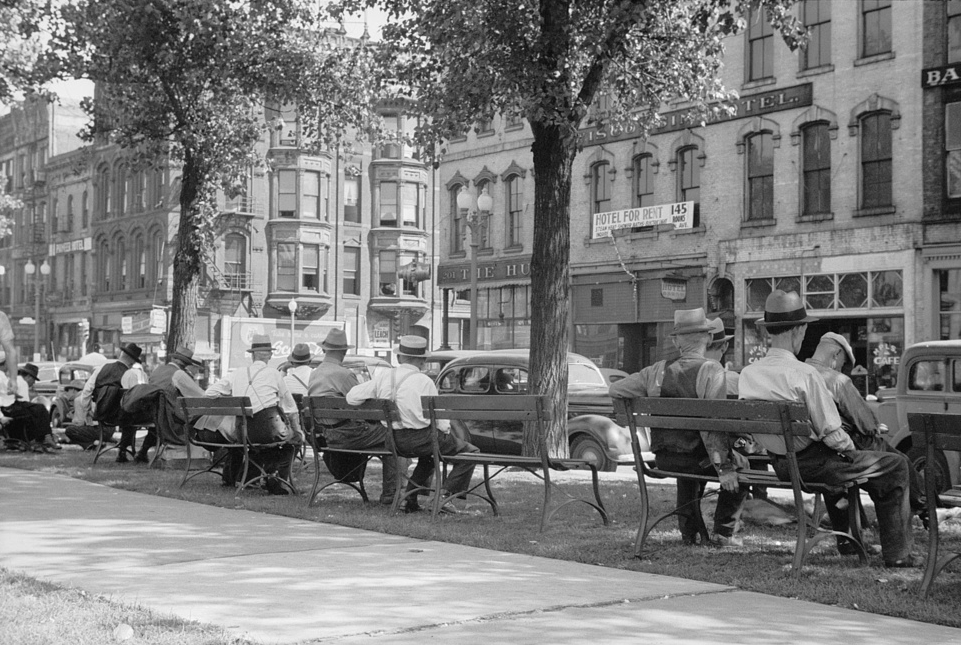
1939

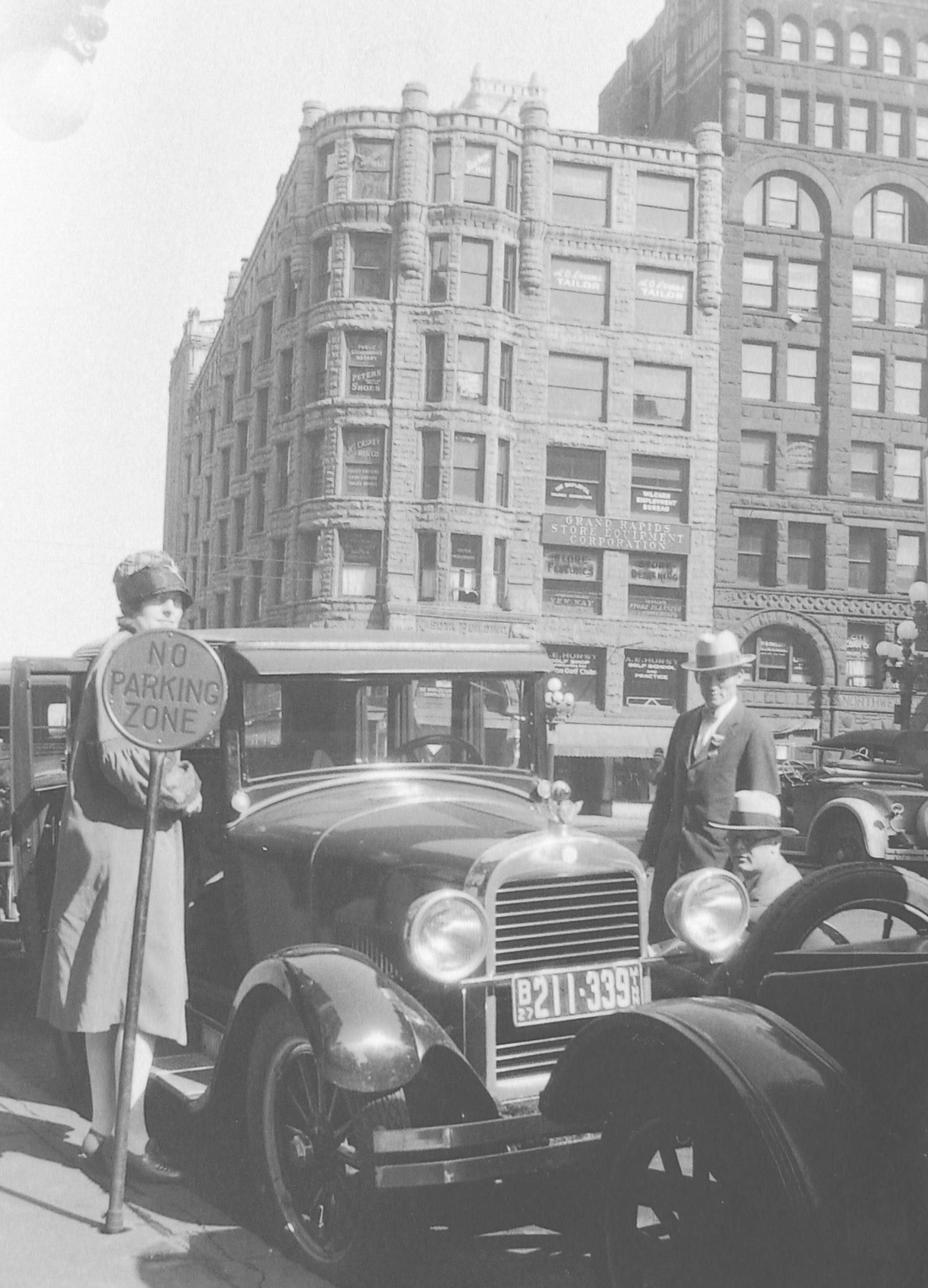
Kasota building in 1927 Gateway District

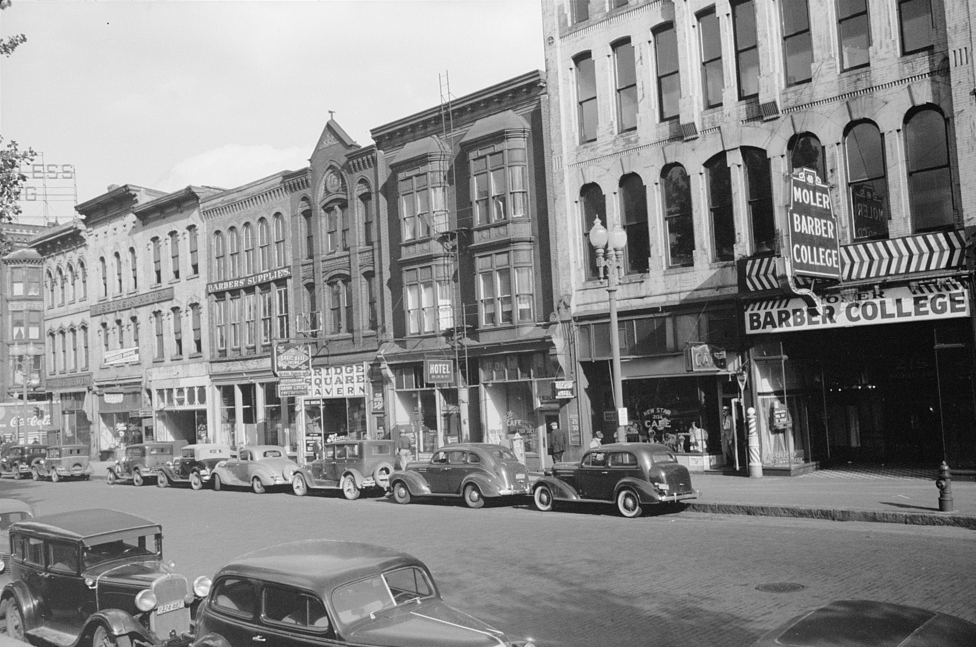
1939

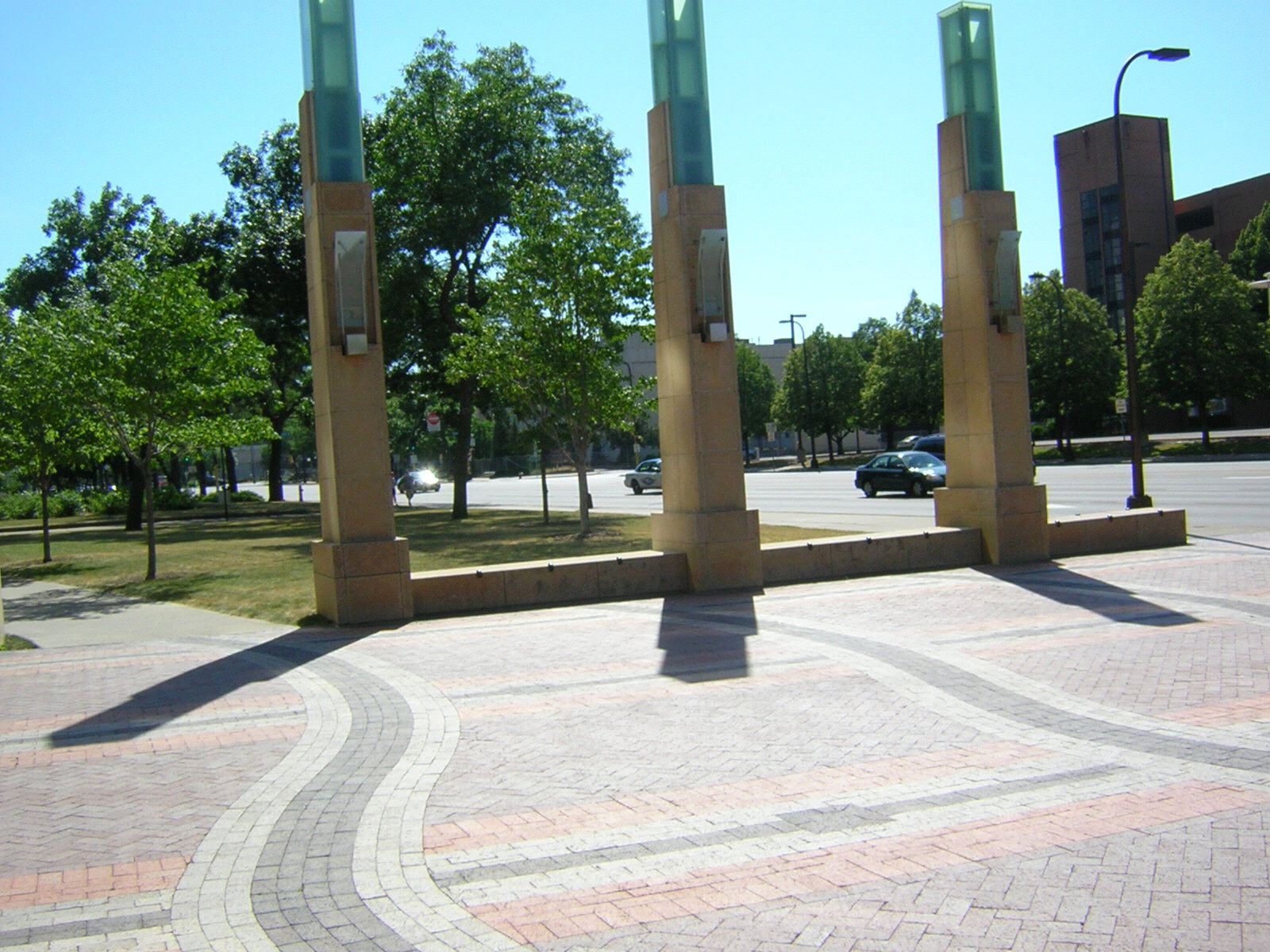
Hennepin Avenue 2007

The Gateway District of Minneapolis is centered at the convergence of Hennepin Avenue, Nicollet Avenue, and Washington Avenue. Its borders are not officially designated or recognized, but are visible as the Mississippi River to the northeast, Cedar Lake Trail and the railroad tracks to the northwest, Fifth Avenue South to the southeast. and Fourth Street South to the southwest. The district includes a significant part of the Downtown West neighborhood and abuts the North Loop.

In the early years of Minneapolis, the neighborhood was called "Bridge Square", because it lay at the southern foot of the Hennepin Avenue Bridge and it was the commercial hub and government seat of the growing city. An early courthouse and city hall were located in a triangle-shaped building in between Washington, Hennepin and, Nicollet from 1873 to 1912. Some of the early permanent structures on the West side of Minneapolis were built directly across from that building.

The "Gateway District" was given such a name in hopes of revitalizing it at the turn of the 20th century, hoping to restore its status as the gateway into Minneapolis. Both the Minneapolis Great Northern Depot and the Milwaukee Road Depot were situated in the area, and numerous hotels and office buildings were constructed, including the Nicollet Hotel, the Hotel Vendome, the St. James Hotel, the Boston Block, and the Metropolitan building. A Depression-era renewal attempt brought the Minneapolis Main Post Office (1933) and Pioneer Square, the former of which survives.

In the 1930s and the '40s, the Gateway District housed multiple saloons, flophouses, brothels, liquor stores, and working-class housing. The area's anonymity and affordability attracted many of the city's LGBTQ residents, who founded gay bars like the Onyx Bar, the Dugout and Persian Palms. These bars were frequented by diverse groups, including soldiers stationed at Fort Snelling and sex workers, and had strong makeup and cross-dressing cultures. Many bars were mixed-gender and welcomed gender-variant customers. Beginning in 1958, city officials razed 20 blocks of the district, including 200 buildings, and displaced 3,000 residents, to make room for public works like the Minneapolis Central Library. The Metropolitan Building, demolished in 1961, is the most lamented loss of the area. The city's locus of queer culture shifted down Hennepin Avenue towards Loring Park, focused around such historical establishments as The 19 Bar.

The area now boasts some of the city's finest examples of modern architecture. Voya Financial currently occupies the former Northwestern National Life Insurance Building (1965), which occupies four blocks of the Gateway. The Federal Reserve Bank of Minneapolis was located in a suspension building (1973) at the terminus of the Nicollet Mall. It is now located on the Mississippi riverbank across Hennepin Avenue from the central Minneapolis post office.

With the construction of the new Central Library for the Minneapolis Public Library system, the old gateway has become a target for developers and planners. Former Minneapolis mayor R. T. Rybak had proposed a park, trees and a 10-year action plan for Washington Avenue.

On Feb. 4, 2015, city planners recommended that the City Council approve selling the former Nicollet Hotel block to United Properties, a main holding of the Pohlads, who also own the Minnesota Twins. The development is a 36-story tower dubbed "The Gateway," that will serve as the headquarters for RBC wealth management and contain a Four-Seasons hotel.

== See also ==
- History of Minneapolis, Minnesota
- Skid row
