= The Backstreet =

Gay leather bar in London, England

Coordinates: 51.5246°N 0.0342°W

The Backstreet was a gay leather bar on the Mile End Road in London's East End. It was London's longest running, and last remaining leather bar, having opened in April 1985. In 2019, it was saved from redevelopment by Tower Hamlets Council, which stated that the redevelopment would "harm the long-term provision of a nightclub that serves the LGBT+ community". The reprieve was short lived however, and the bar closed permanently on 17 July 2022.

In 2024, a documentary film about the leather bar The Backstreet premiered at the Sheffield Docfest directed by Romain Beck.

== See also ==
- List of LGBTQ bars
