= Video Pub =

Gay bar in Jerusalem

- Interactive map of Video Pub
- Location: Yohanan Horkanos Street, Russian Compound, Jerusalem, Israel
- Type: Gay bar

Construction
- Opened: 2012
- Closed: 2026

Video Pub was a gay bar in Jerusalem. It was the only dedicated gay bar in the city, which is generally known for its religious conservatism.

== Description ==
Video Pub was established in January, 2012. While it was the only gay bar in Jerusalem, it was not the first. A now-defunct gay bar called "The Mikveh" had previously opened in 2011. The building that Video Bar was located in was previously a farmhouse outside of Jerusalem's Old City district, before the area was urbanized.

When Video Club closed in 2026, it was the last gay bar in Jerusalem.

== See also ==
- List of LGBTQ bars
