= Downtown Olly's =

LGBTQ bar and restaurant in Indianapolis, Indiana, US

Downtown Olly's is an LGBTQ sports bar and restaurant in downtown Indianapolis, Indiana, U.S. Opened in 2002, it is one of seven gay bars in the city. In 2022, it was named as the "LGBTQ Venue of the Year". They often hold backyard and pride based events, including drag shows and queer stand-up comedy. The bar sponsors and furnishes a float in the Indy Pride Parade each June.

== History ==
Before Downtown Olly's was established, it was called Brothers in the 1970s, which was also a gay bar; it had no windows as patrons feared being shot at or seen within the bar.

It turned into a more well-known bar later, being a very comfortable and relaxed environment for Midwestern queer people. It is especially popular for Midwestern queer people due to "unpretentious welcomeness, cheap and abundant beer, pork tenderloin sandwiches and dinner specials named after Indianapolis 500 race flags".

The bar used to be open 24/7, but that changed due to a rise in hate crimes in and around the bar in 2022. This also resulted in the bar closing for "team safety training" for a period of time.

== Gallery ==
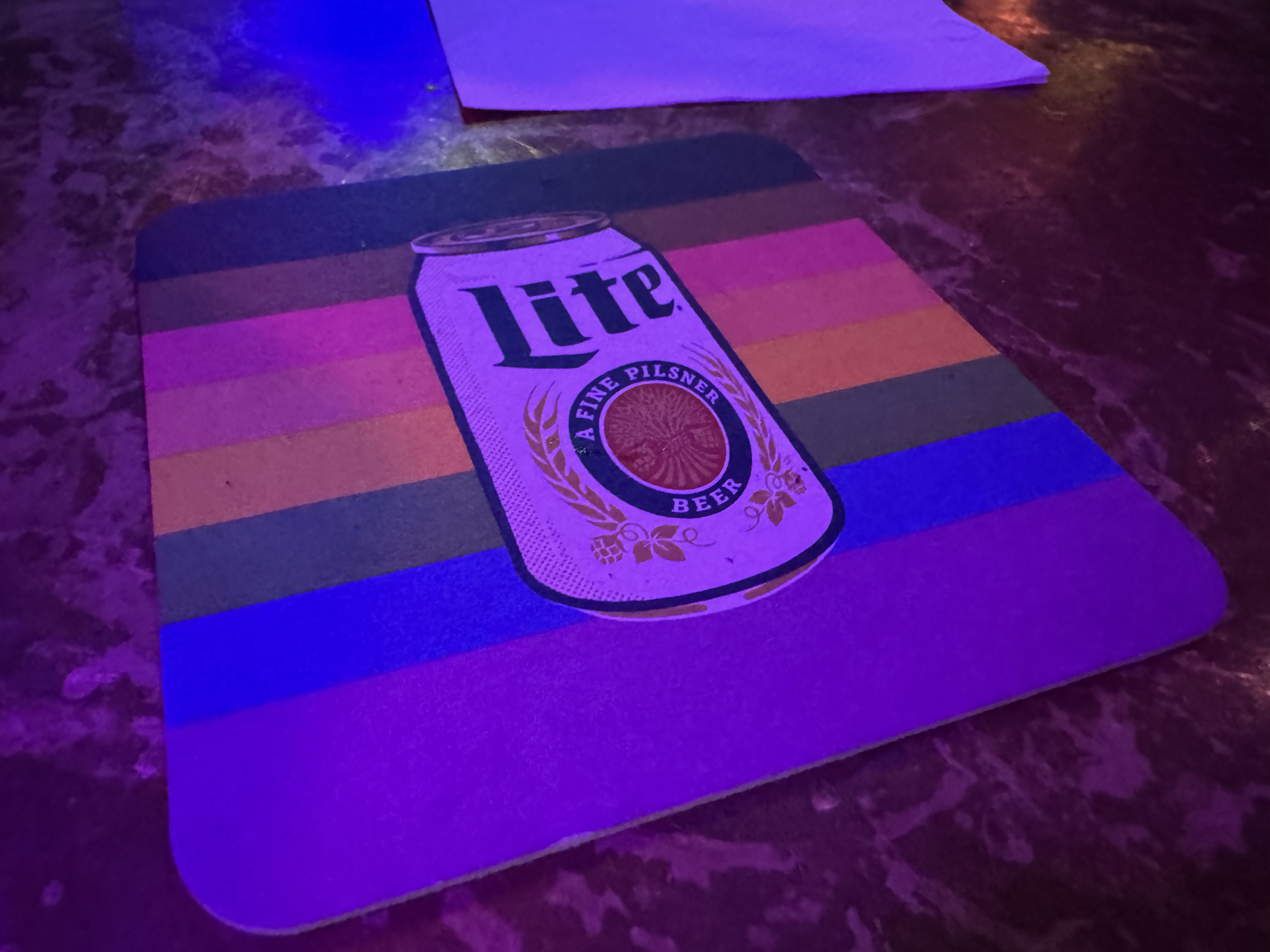
An LGBT themed coaster in Downtown Olly's

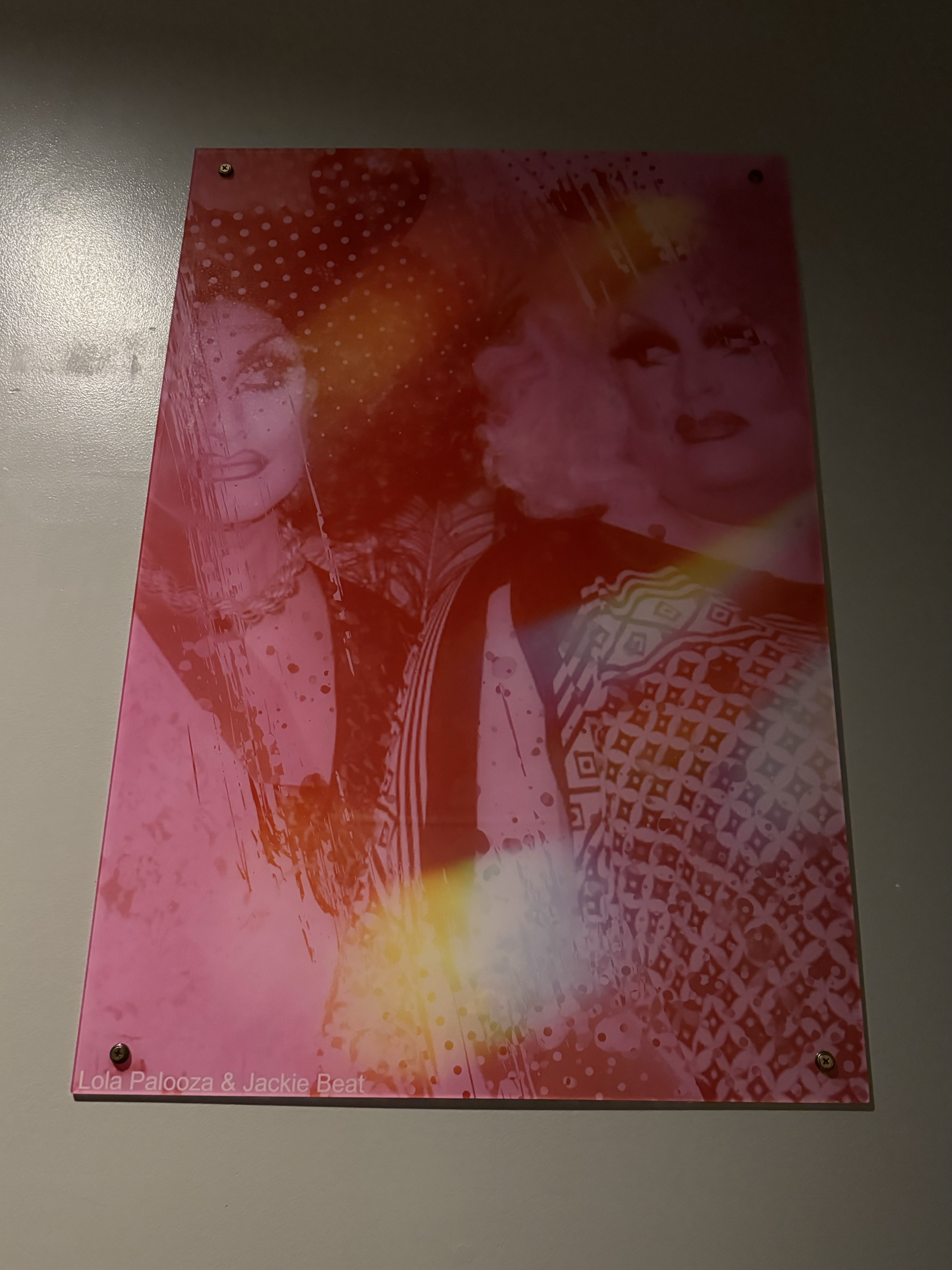
Bathroom wall art in Downtown Olly's.

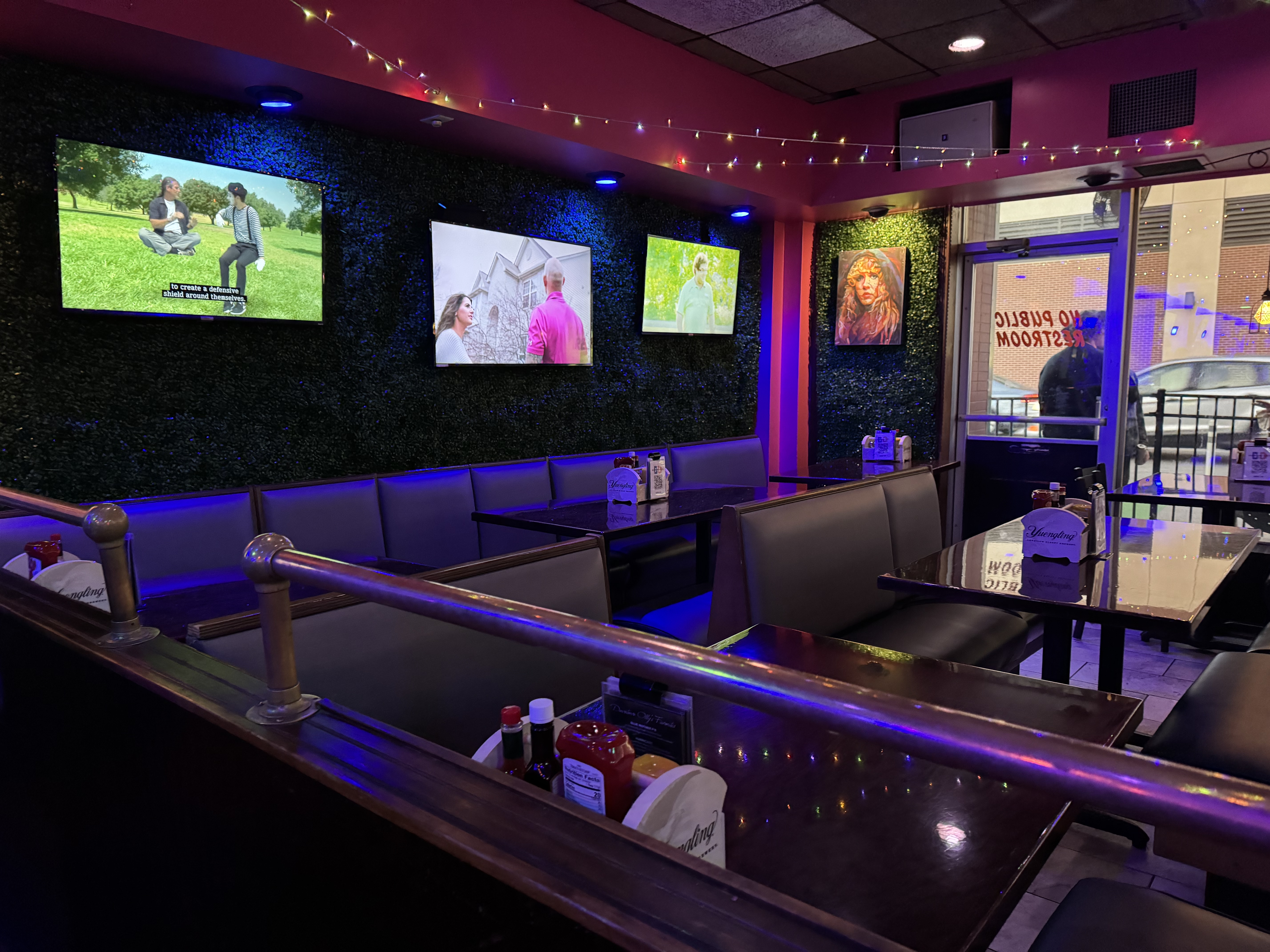
The lounge of Downtown Olly's.

== See also ==
- List of LGBT bars
- List of attractions and events in Indianapolis
- List of LGBTQ bars
