= Tom's Bar =

Defunct gay bar in Berlin, Germany

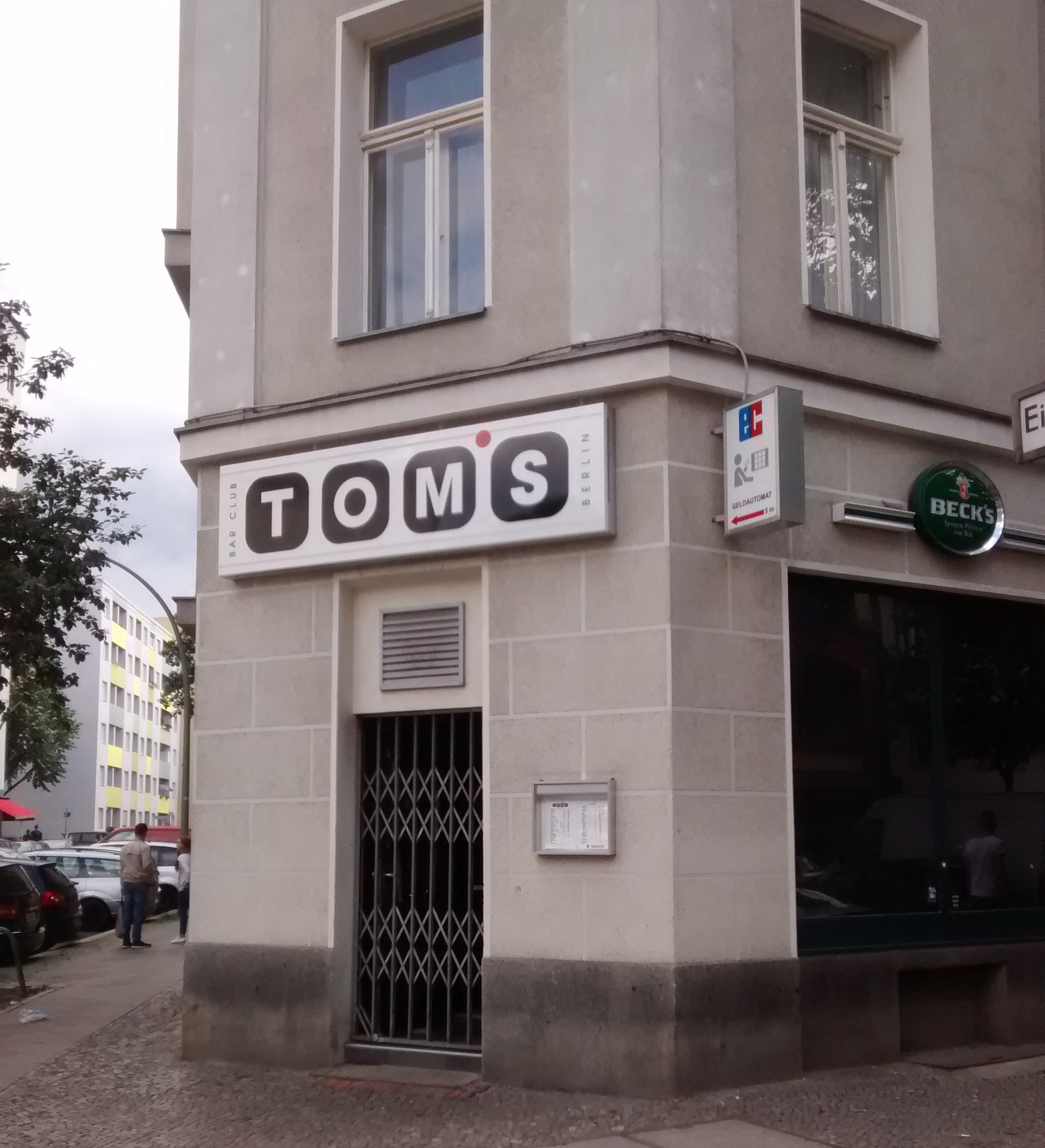
- The bar's exterior in 2016
- Interactive map of Tom's Bar
- Address: Motzstraße 19 10777
- Location: Berlin, Germany
- Coordinates: 52.498180643032356°N 13.349714492405989°E
- Type: Gay bar

Tom's Bar was a popular gay bar in the Schöneberg locality of Berlin, Germany.

== Description and history ==
Tom's Bar opened in April 1982 in the gay district of Berlin's Schöneberg and, like Toms Saloon in Hamburg, initially operated predominantly as a leather bar, eventually adopting a less prescriptive dress code. The bar, which experienced marked changes following new ownership in 1993, was described as a "dark, sweaty and debauched men-only cruising establishment" with a "rough, manly atmosphere". One of its slogans was "for successful cruising". The space, on two floors, included a darkroom. Tom's closed in late February 2024, replaced in March 2024 by the Berlin outlet of Joan Igual's Barcelona/Madrid gay cruising bar enterprise Boyberry.

== Reception ==
According to Berlin Tourismus and Kongress GmbH, the bar's slogan "puts it in a nutshell, and it's no exaggeration... People of all ages and from all walks of life get together here, especially when the night is getting on." Similarly, Tom's was called a "great place to finish off an evening" in The Rough Guide to Germany (2009). In Top 10 Berlin (2014), Juergen Scheunemann included Tom's Bar as number five on a list of the best gay and lesbian attractions in the city. Scheunemann called the bar a "traditional pub" and a "well-known pick-up joint ... not for those who are shy and timid". Tom's Bar was an iconic Berlin establishment; it was the gay place that tourists had heard of, though the space became unrecognisable from its "clone"-era days of leather manliness inspired by master erotic draughtsman Touko Laaksonen (1920–91), better known as Tom of Finland.

== See also ==
- Easter Berlin, Berlin's annual leather and fetish event
- Folsom Europe, Berlin's annual BDSM and leather street festival
- LGBTQ culture in Berlin
- List of LGBTQ bars
