= Bar Champs =

- Entrance to Bar Champs
- Address: 3956 Boulevard Saint-Laurent; Montréal; Canada
- Owner: Sarah Fobes, Raphael Kerwin, and five other partners
- Type: Lesbian Sports Bar

Website
- https://champsmontreal.com/

Bar Champs, sometimes referred to as Champs or Champs Bar, is a lesbian sports bar in Montréal's Le Plateau-Mont Royal neighborhood.

== History ==
Bar Champs originally opened in the 1980s, and was a traditionally masculine sports bar. In 2021, Bar Champs re-opened under new ownership. Co-owner Sarah Fobes, a queer woman and sports writer, told reporters "I'm going to make it as queer as possible—and a space where women and queer people feel as safe as possible." Fobes has also described the bar as "our lesbian mecca."

In addition to broadcasting sports games, Bar Champs hosts Spurs, a queer line-dancing event, as well as Kiki balls, queer strip competitions, Heated Rivalry and RuPaul's Drag Race screenings, and weekly Dyke Nights and Saturgays.

Neon "Lesbians" Sign at Bar Champs

In 2024, the bar was ordered to close for 5 days and banned dancing for ten months, after Quebec's liquor board found them to be in violation of a permit. In 2025, Bar Champs also faced repeated noise complaints from the landlord of a neighboring apartment building, resulting in multiple visits from the Montréal police. Pamela Bernstein, a Bar Champs employee, said Bar Champs spent more than $30,000 CAD in the resulting legal fees and $14,000 to install soundproofing. In October 2025, Bar Champs was awarded a permit and allowed to resume dancing on Fridays, Saturdays, and holidays. Community members have pointed to the noise complaints as a sign of gentrification and NIMBYism threatening Montréal's nightlife.

== See also ==
- Media related to Bar Champs at Wikimedia Commons
- List of LGBTQ bars
