= Hunters Palm Springs =

Gay bar and nightclub in Palm Springs, California, U.S.

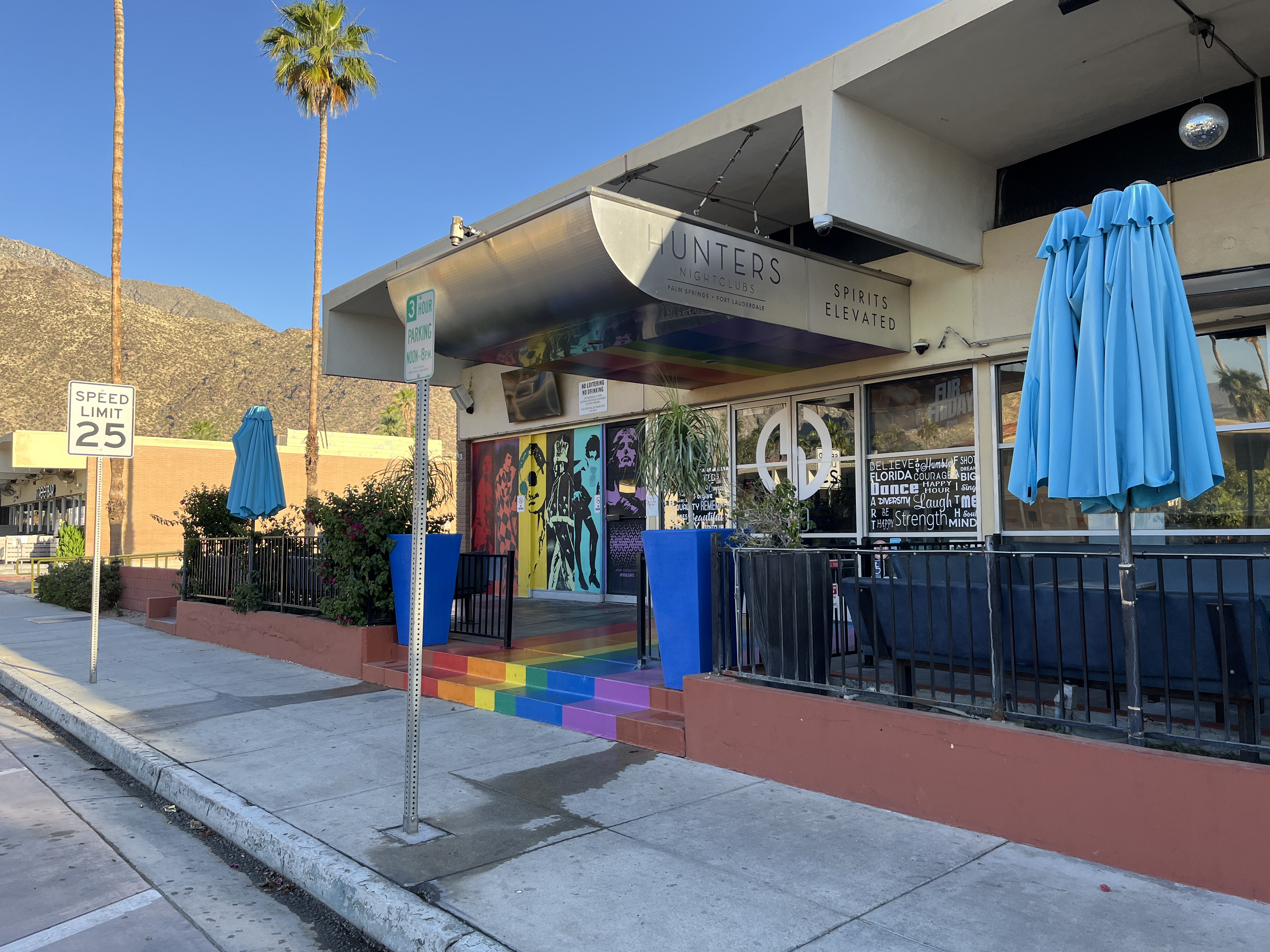
- The venue's exterior, 2024
- Interactive map of Hunters Palm Springs

Restaurant information
- Established: 1998
- Location: 302 East Arenas Road, Palm Springs, California, 92262, United States
- Coordinates: 33.8214°N 116.5441°W
- Website: hunterspalmsprings.com

Hunters Palm Springs, also known as Hunters Video Bar or simply Hunters, is a gay bar and nightclub founded in 1998 on East Arenas Road in Palm Springs, California.

== Description ==
Hunters Palm Springs was founded in 1998 by Mark Hunter, and his first club, Hunters Chicago, was in Elk Grove Village.

Hunters has been described as a "gay video and dance bar", and has hosted drag bingo, trivia, catwalk shows, underwear contests, and tea dances. It has a dance area and a patio, and began serving food during the COVID-19 pandemic.

The menu has included hot dogs, pizza, and tacos. According to The Desert Sun, "With help from the Palm Springs Art Commission, the patio space includes public art, as well as tables and chairs, televisions and music."

== See also ==
- List of LGBTQ bars
