= XXL (club) =

London gay nightclub

Coordinates: 51.5071°N 0.1038°W

XXL was a gay nightclub in London and Birmingham which catered to the bear sub-group. The club was founded by Mark Ames and his then partner David Dindol in 2000. They separated in 2005, after which Mark purchased his ex-partner's share of the club. It was the largest dedicated "bear" venue in the United Kingdom and the world. It was not just the bear scene's longest-running weekly disco but London's too, having not missed a night in over 16 years.

Between 2012 and 2019, XXL London was based at Pulse, which closed in September 2019 to make way for a future development of luxury apartments. There are currently no public plans for a future venue but it is understood that discussions are ongoing.

== Venue ==
XXL was based at Pulse in Southwark, on the corner of Southwark Street and Blackfriars Road. Pulse was on the same street as the previous venue, Arcadia. Both consist of a number of railway arches.

After Arcadia became unsafe due to a structural fault in the railway arches (which only affected the nightclub, but not the trains running above), XXL moved to Pulse in March 2012, one of the capital's largest entertainment venues that was developed and converted by Ames and his team.

Which then in 2025 the club resumed at a new venue in Tottenham Hale for New Years Eve.

== History ==
Mark Ames created XXL as he felt disillusioned with how little there was for the London Bear Community outside of one bar in Soho.

In 2003, XXL in London created Bear Necessities, now called XXL London Bear Pride, a weekend-long celebration of everything "big, gay and hairy" with events around the country. A year later this turned into London Bear Pride. In 2006 this was expanded to include the leather community in Bear and Leather Pride. The two subcultures do have a large overlap and a number of leather fetishists patronize XXL.

XXL also operates internationally both in Europe and the US as well as a monthly night in the UK's second city Birmingham and has other events too. In 2014, XXL launched a monthly event in Glasgow.

Opinion polls in magazines such as Gay Times, the Pink Paper and Boyz regularly put XXL in the top two night clubs in London. XXL was also the title sponsor of the 2006 Bingham Cup in New York. In 2007 the club expanded and also diversified the brand by launching new nights, extending its appeal far beyond the core audience. In 2009 Ames became the gay promoter of the year according to the London Boyz Magazine readers' poll and was named as a gay icon in London's QX magazine. In the 2017 Boyz Awards, XXL was voted best club, with two of the XXL DJs (Joe Egg and David Robson) appearing in the Top 10 most popular DJs.

There were four resident DJs at XXL; Alex Logan (from 2004), Joe Egg (from 2007), David Robson (from 2015) and Paul Morrell (from 2016). Logan and Morrell play contemporary house and dance mixes with a tribal edge in the main room; occasionally joined by Mark Ames himself. Egg and Robson play an eclectic set of contemporary and retro pop, rock, indie, soul, R&B, bashment and disco in the smaller room, known as 'The Fur Lounge'.

In 2015 it was announced that regular guest DJs would play in the main room rotating on a monthly basis in between the weekly residents' sessions. These DJs are currently The Hoxton Whores (began residency 11 July 2015), Moto Blanco (beginning summer 2015), Fat Tony (from 2017).

In 2019 it was announced that XXL was being evicted from Pulse, as the building was being redeveloped into flats and a shopping mall, by the landlords, Native Land. The last XXL at Pulse was on Saturday 21 September 2019.

== Criticisms ==
In June 2010 the UK gay press reported on comments written by Mark Ames on his Facebook page in which he stated that he would boycott Muslim businesses. He issued an unreserved apology.

Ames caused controversy again in 2018 after a customer was turned away from XXL whilst wearing high heels. After responding to the controversy on Facebook, protests were organised in other LGBT venues.

== See also ==
- List of LGBTQ bars
