= El Rio (gay bar) =

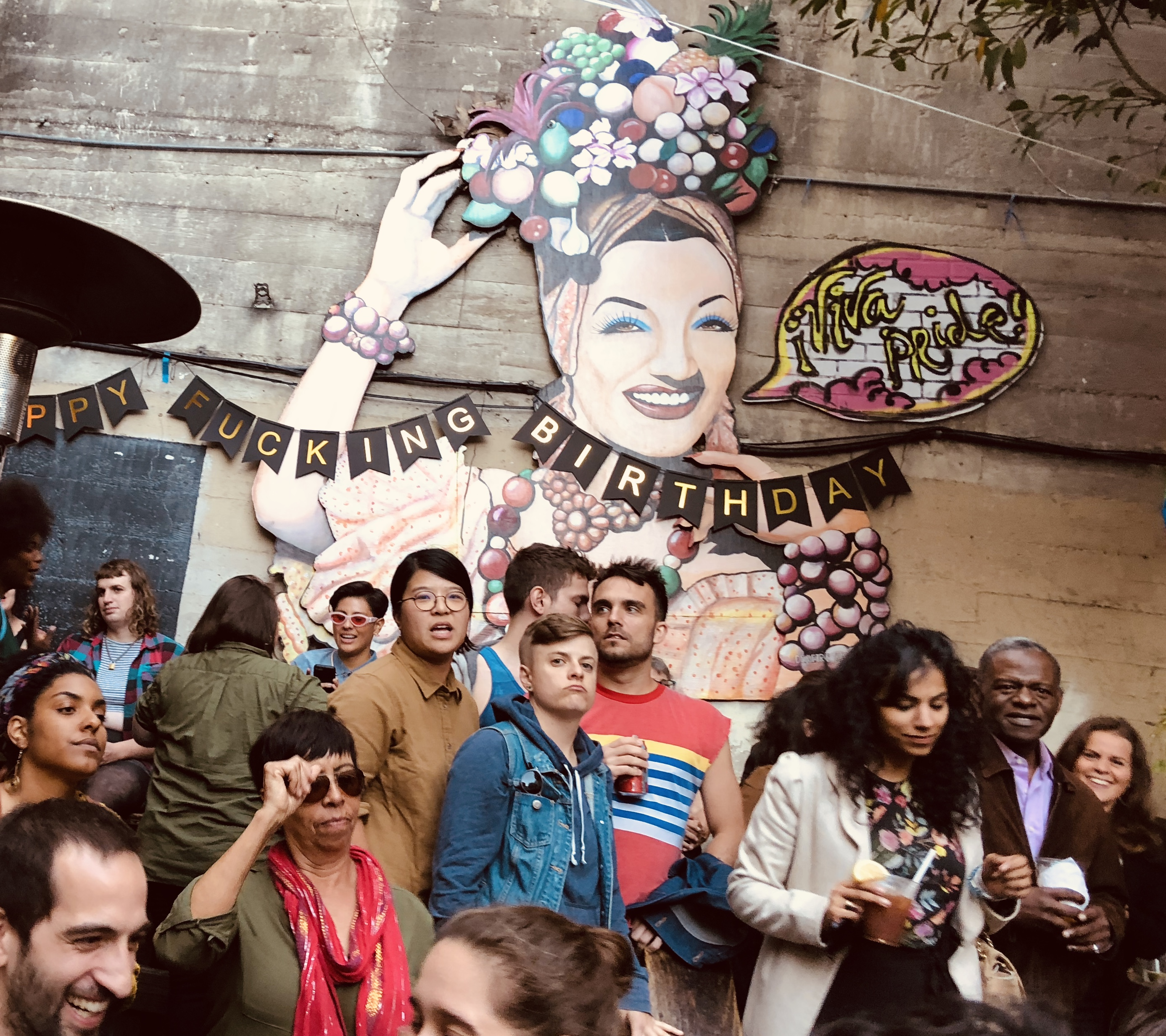
- El Rio, 40th Anniversary Party 2018

General information
- Type: Gay bar
- Location: 3158 Mission Street, San Francisco, United States

El Rio is a gay bar located at 3158 Mission Street, San Francisco, California. It was the first gay bar to debut queer salsa in San Francisco. El Río was established in 1978 as a Leather Brazilian Gay Bar and has been recognized as a Legacy Business by the San Francisco Small Business Commission. El Rio is best known for supporting the community by providing a space for community gatherings, LGBT performances, diverse forms of music and dancing, and offering a space for community fundraising events.

== History ==
El Rio was founded by Malcolm Thornley and Robert Nett. The bar was inspired by their “leather motorcycle riding lifestyle and their love for Brazil.” Malcolm and Robert owned the bar from 1978 to 1997, until they retired. Dawn Huston took over the bar in 1997. However, Malcolm and Robert stayed in contact with the bar many years after their retirement.

== Fundraisers ==
El Rio describes itself as a neighborhood bar, and its location in the Mission District has contributed to its commitment to Latino communities. El Rio is “the longest-running multigender, multicultural, multigenerational live Latino music dance party in the city that attracts queers, straights, and others.” El Rio is organized as a profit sharing business and community benefits are a fundamental element of their business model. El Rio focuses on accommodating everyone to help facilitate the process of organizing a fundraiser for people that have never done so before. Malcolm and Robert had weekly benefit parties that were extended once Dawn Huston became owner. The bar prioritizes local organizations in the Mission, LGBTQ rights organizations, local schools, children and family support organizations, women’s groups, gender justice organizations, and animal rescue agencies.

=== Fundraiser beneficiaries ===
- The Housing Rights Committee
- Causa Justa::Just Cause
- Mujeres Unidas y Activas
- Modern Times Bookstore
- The San Francisco Dyke March
- The Transgender, Gender Variant and Intersex Justice Project
- Breast Cancer Action
- The Chinese Progressive Association
- St James Infirmary Clinic
- The Mario Woods Foundation

== Culture ==
El Rio has hosted some of the longest running cultural events “that provide an anchor for LGBTQ communities of color in San Francisco.” Some of the events include:

- Salsa Sundays, a live music party that has been rooted in the LGBT Latino community and has been running for over 30 years
- Mango, a monthly tea party for women of color and their friends. Mango is a popular daytime event that has been running in El Rio since the 1980s.

El Rio has also hosted after parties for both the Trans March and Dyke March. It has also been a gathering point for Dykes on Bikes.

El Rio is frequently described as a very inclusive space. They “have always been a mixed space, and our community also encompasses a broad range of public school teachers, service workers, construction workers and trades people, musicians, dancers, artists, politicians and activists.”

== Recognition ==
El Rio was awarded the Legacy Business Status. As stated by the San Francisco Bay Times, an LGBTQ News and Calendar for the Bay Area, legacy business recognize “the cultural importance of long standing, community-serving businesses.” The San Francisco Historic Preservation Commission noted that “El Rio’s back patio, garden, and massive lemon trees” should be “safeguarded.” Similarly, they also mentioned that their large font interior bar, wooden painting of Carmen Miranda and Marilyn Monroe, should be preserved as well.

It is very difficult to qualify for the Legacy Business Status. In terms of a legacy business, El Rio is 30 years or older, it contributed to the history and culture of its neighborhood, and it was nominated by Supervisor Hillary Ronen, District 9 in 2017. In Hillary Ronen’s letter of nomination, she distinctly accords that “El Rio is an anchor for the Mission District.”

=== Significant people associated with El Rio ===
- Phyllis Lyon and Del Martin, San Francisco’s feminists and civil rights activist were patrons of El Rio
- Jello Biafra, the former lead singer and songwriter of the San Francisco punk band The Dead Kennedys “regularly” attends shows at the bar.
- San Francisco Supervisors, Tom Ammiano and David Campos have held events at the bar
- Monika Treut, the famous German lesbian filmmaker filmed “Virgin Machine” (1988) at El Rio.

=== Accolades ===
- 2016 “Best Neighborhood Bar” - Bay Area Reporter
- 2016 “Best Small Live Music Venue” - Bay Area Reporter
- 2016 “Best Women’s Party, Mango” - Bay Area Reporter
- 2016 “Best Nightlife Party, Hard French” - Bay Area Reporter
- 2015/16 “Best Dog Friendly Bar” - Bay Woof Readers
- 2015 “Best Neighborhood Bar, Mango,” “Best Women’s Party, Hard French,” “Best Afternoon Party” - Bay Area Reporter
- 2014 “Best Dog Friendly Bar” - Bay Woof Readers
- 2014 “Best Lesbian Bar” - Bay Guardian Readers
- 2013 “Best Dive Bar” - Bay Guardian
- 2013 “Best Dive Bar” - foursquare
- 2013 “Best Queer Dance Spot ~ Hard French” - Bay Guardian
- 2013 “Best Food Cart ~ Rocky’s Fry Bread” - Bay Guardian
- 2012 “Small Business Award: Community Service”
- 2012 “Community Ally Award” - Harvy Milk Club
- 2012 “Pride Community Award” - SF Pride
- 2012 “Certificate of Special Congressional Recognition” - SF Mayor/Board Of Supervisors
- 2012 “Certificate of Honor” - Board of Supervisors

== See also ==
- Gay bar
- Trans march
- Dyke march
- Bay Area Reporter
- San Francisco Bay Times
- Homosocialization
- Lesbian bar
- List of LGBTQ bars
