= Toad Hall Bar =

Gay bar in San Francisco, California, U.S.

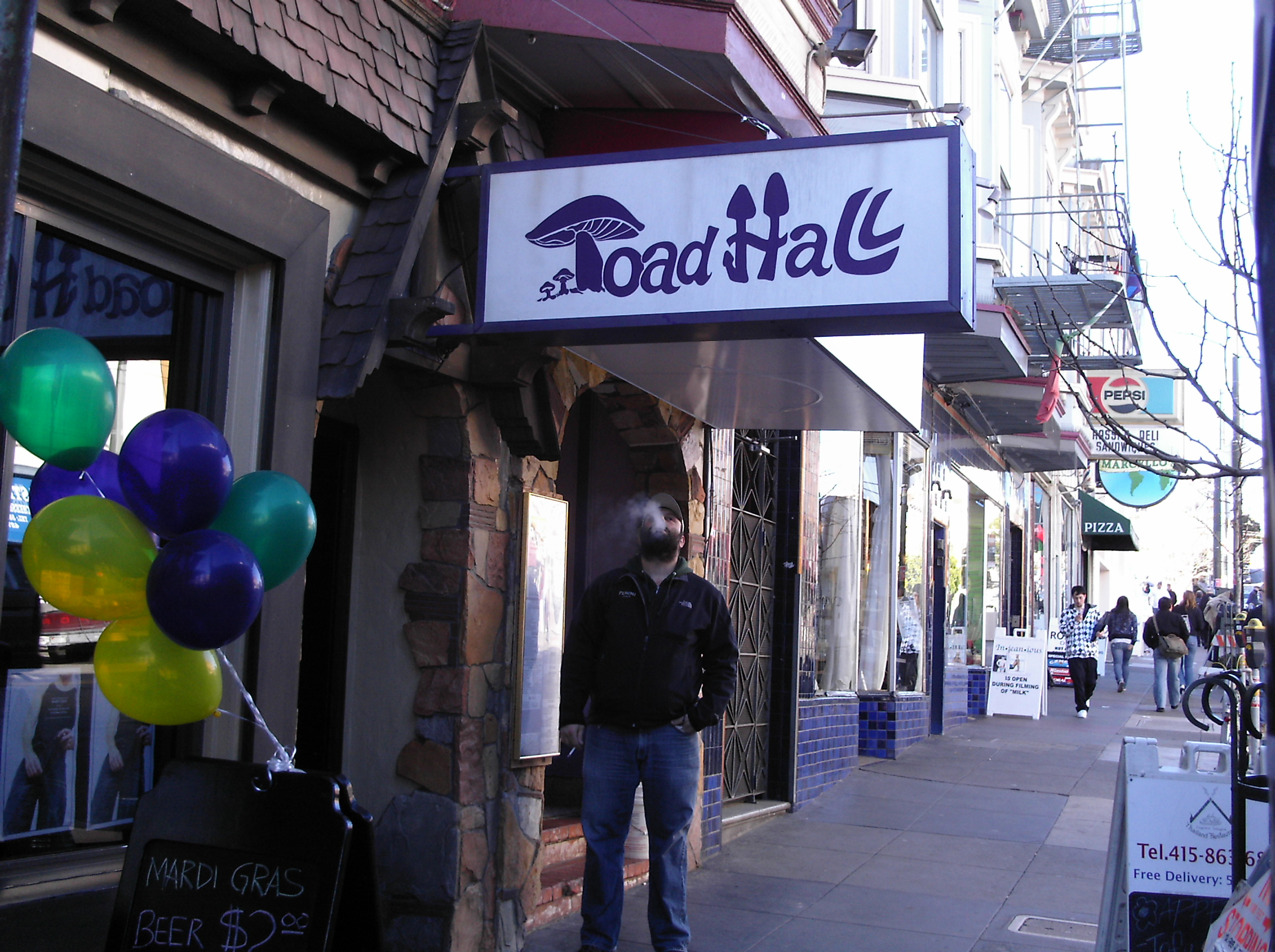
- Toad Hall restored for Milk, February 2008
- Interactive map of Toad Hall Bar
- Address: 4146 18th Street
- Location: San Francisco, California, U.S.
- Coordinates: 37.76099°N 122.43593°W

Construction
- Opened: 2009

Website
- toadhallbar.com

Toad Hall Bar is a gay bar located at 4146 18th Street in San Francisco's Castro District, in the U.S. state of California.

== History ==
The site at 4146 18th Street formerly housed The Pendulum. Toad Hall's facade was restored in 2008, for the filming of Milk.

The original Toad Hall bar was located at 482 Castro Street (now Walgreens) and was opened from 1971 until c. 1979. The name Toad Hall was derived from the fictional home of Mr. Toad, a character in the 1908 novel The Wind in the Willows by Kenneth Grahame.

== See also ==
- List of LGBTQ bars
