= The Saloon (Minneapolis) =

Gay bar in Minneapolis

Coordinates: 44.976652°N 93.276933°W

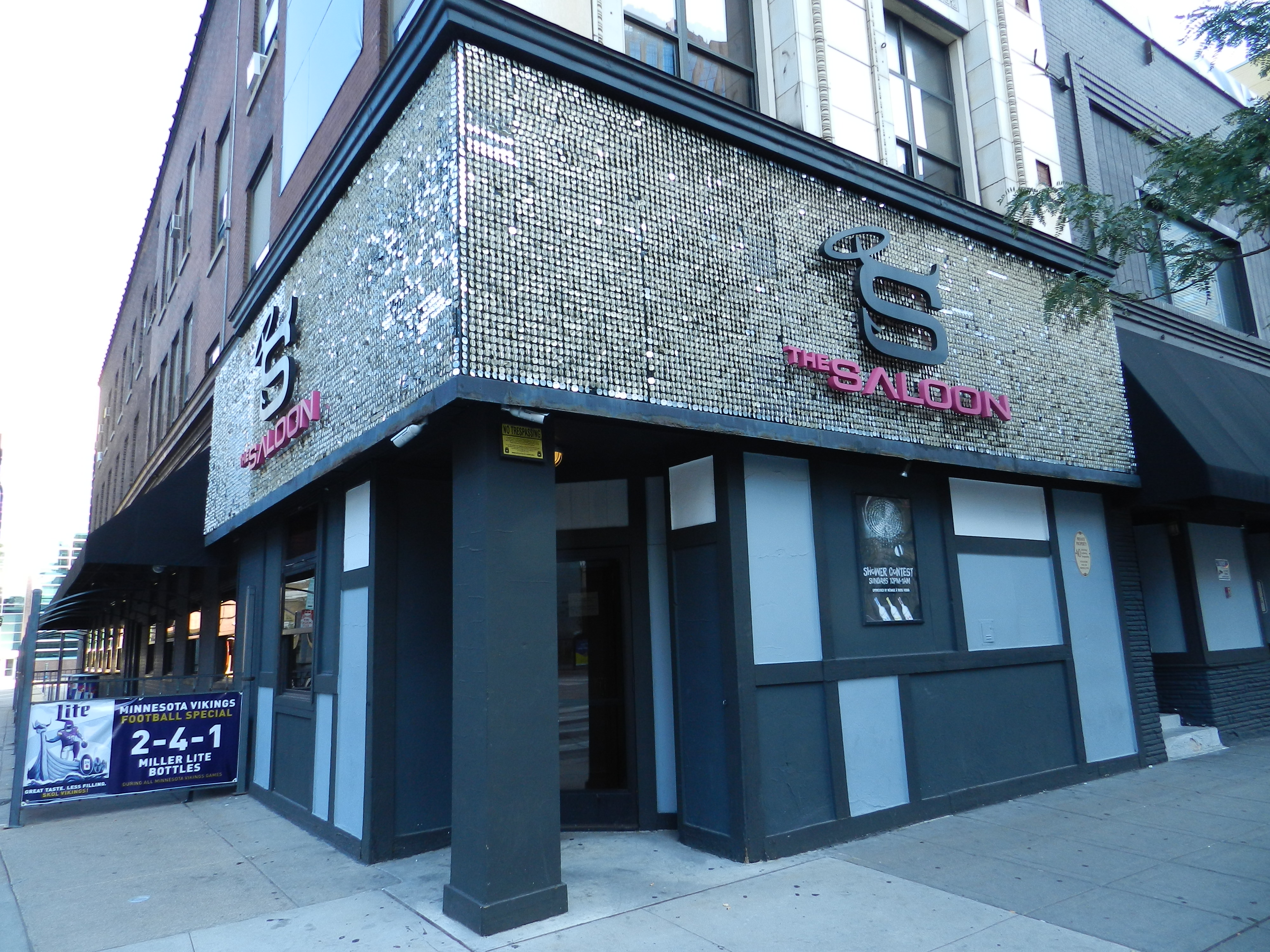
Entrance to The Saloon

Block party at the Saloon during Twin Cities Pride in 2024

The Saloon Minneapolis is a gay bar located at 830 Hennepin Avenue in downtown Minneapolis. It is co-owned by John Moore and Jim "Andy" Anderson. It is one of the oldest gay bars currently in operation in Minneapolis, founded in 1977. The Saloon is an important gay culture icon in the Twin Cities that is regularly featured in the popular press and oral histories. Local CBS affiliate WCCO rated it as one of the best gay bars in the Twin Cities.

The Saloon is also a performance venue. Vanessa Vanjie Mateo performed at the venue in 2018. Todrick Hall performed at the bar to kick-off the 2018 Twin Cities Pride festival.

== See also ==
- List of LGBTQ bars
