= Down the Street =

Gay nightclub in New Jersey, United States

Coordinates: 40.21736°N 74.00384°W

Down the Street was a gay nightclub in Asbury Park, New Jersey, United States.

== History ==
It was opened in 1988 by John Hitchcock, previously manager and DJ at another club, M&K. The name 'Down the Street' was used because it was located down the street from other popular gay clubs, Odyssey and M&K.

The club had a dance floor, five bars, light shows, and drag contests. It also had an outside area which included a volleyball court, food cart and another building which housed a quieter bar, The Clubhouse. When Asbury Park declined in the 1980s, all other gay clubs in the city closed or were razed except Down the Street, which managed to stay open. It closed in 1999 and was the oldest and longest-operating gay disco in New Jersey's history. Hitchcock moved to Florida with his partner and opened a bar called The Cubby Hole.

The resident DJ at Down The Street was Billy Krauter, and other DJs who appeared included Steven Issac and DJ Robert Randy Koska, both of whom played at the opening night in the 1980s and closing night in 1999. The club also hosted performances by artists including Thelma Houston, Sybil and Kristine W.

== Anybody's ==
In 2001, another gay bar, Anybody's, was opened in the small separate building at the back of the club known as "The Clubhouse". The bar closed on June 24, 2006, and was demolished by the city under eminent domain in 2007.

== See also ==
- LGBT history in Asbury Park, New Jersey
- List of LGBTQ bars
