= George and Dragon, Shoreditch =

Pub in London

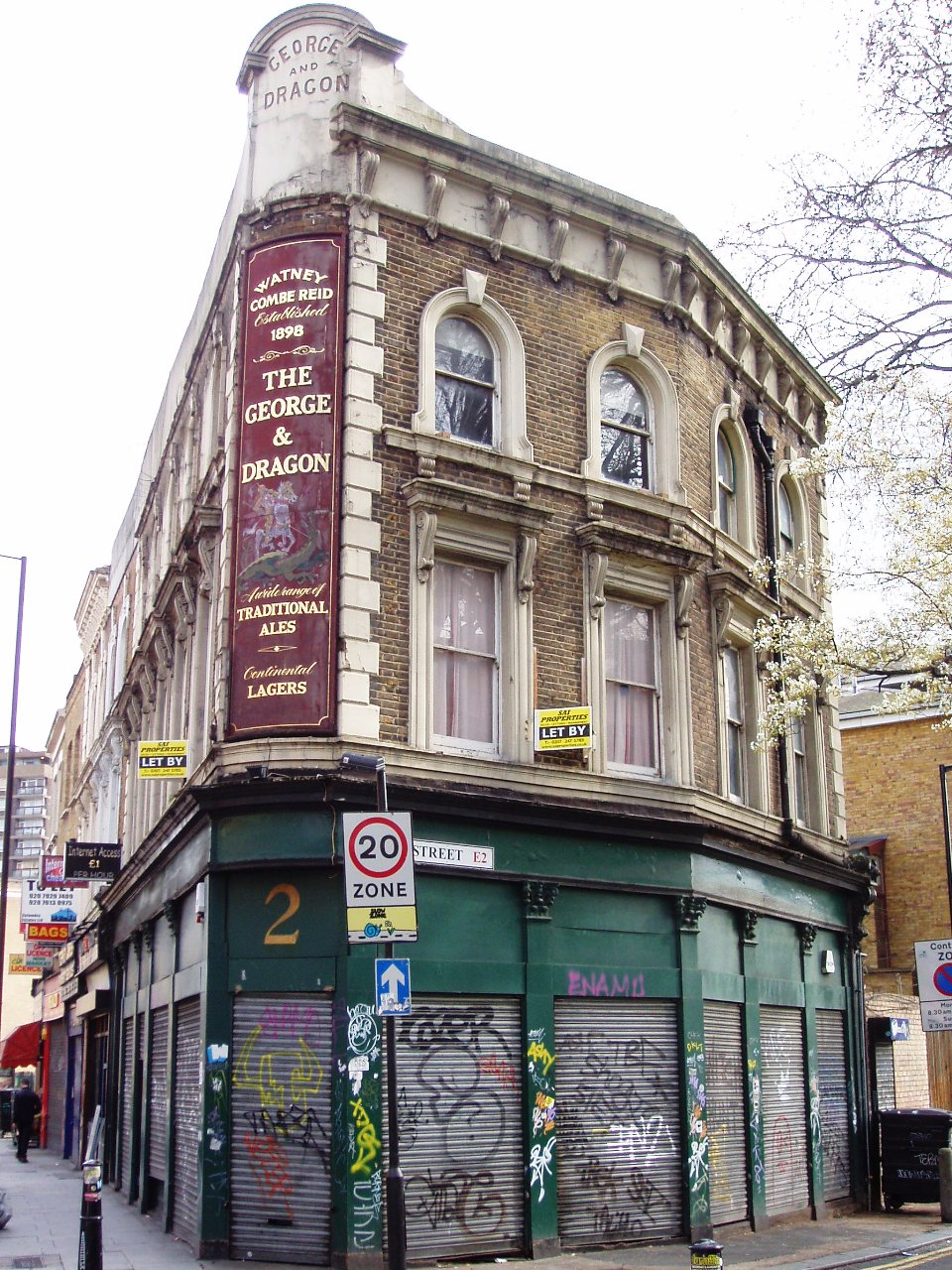
- The George and Dragon

- Location within London Borough of Hackney Location within Greater London

General information
- Location: 2-4 Hackney Road, Shoreditch, London, England
- Coordinates: 51°31′46.9″N 0°4′28.6″W

The George and Dragon was a pub at 2-4 Hackney Road, Shoreditch, London.

In August 2015, the pub's closure was announced, due to a "dramatic" rent increase, and a campaign was launched for it to become an Asset of Community Value.

It was a well-known gay venue, and featured live arts projects in conjunction with the Institute of Contemporary Arts, and was known for "total fun and mindless hedonism".

The pub was refurbished and reopened in 2018 as the Mikkeller Bar London, a partnership between Danish cuckoo brewer Mikkeller and singer Rick Astley

== See also ==
- List of LGBTQ bars
