= PickleBack 2 =

LGBTQ bar in Durham, North Carolina

- PickleBack2 in 2026
- Interactive map of PickleBack 2
- Former names: Competition; Visions; All About Eve; Club Bedrock; Steel Blue; The Bar
- Location: 711 Rigsbee Avenue; Durham, North Carolina, U.S.
- Coordinates: 36.0024°N 78.9002°W
- Owner: Renee Batchelor
- Type: Gay bar

Website
- pickleback2.com

PickleBack 2 is an LGBTQ bar in Durham, North Carolina. It is located at 711 Rigsbee Avenue near Durham Central Park and the Foster and West Geer Streets Historic District.

== History ==
The one-story, flat rood brick mid-century modern building was built in 1959 and originally housed the GMAC Insurance Corporation.

In 1991, it housed a gay bar called Competition that featured a patio deck, outside bar, bbq pit, and a sand volleyball court. Over the years, the building housed multiple queer-owned establishments, including Visions and All About Eve. It briefly housed a hip hop club called Club Bedrock that was not an LGBTQ establishment. Following Club Bedrock, Theresa Harris purchased the building and founded a new queer club called Steel Blue, which she originally operated from a building along US-70 before purchasing 711 Rigsbee Avenue. A local queer couple, Renee and Roe, purchased the building in 2011 and operated The Bar until 2021. Renee Batchelor rebranded the establishment, now called The Pickleback 2.

In 2024, the bar began opening at later times due to a lack of cliental in the area as a result of increased building construction with new developments in the neighborhood.

A man was shot and killed outside the bar early in the morning on September 25, 2026.
