= Audrey Joseph =

American nightclub owner

Audrey Joseph is an American record executive, event promoter, nightclub owner and manager, and LGBT rights activist. She is the former president and current member of the San Francisco Entertainment Commission. She started in the recording industry as a nightclub manager and later record executive responsible for some disco-era dance hits. She relocated from New York to San Francisco and opened a popular club and event venue, 177 Townsend/174 King Street, and several gay clubs at those venues including Pleasuredome, Club Universe, and others used for fundraising and events particular to the LGBT community. With San Francisco's changing real estate market the lease on the venue expired, and the building razed; and Joseph started Mezzanine at 444 Jessie, which established itself as a premier venue for DJ talent.

In 1997, Joseph received the Business Person of the Year award as part of the Pantheon of Leather Awards. Joseph was appointed to the San Francisco Entertainment Commission by Mayor Willie L. Brown and took office in July 2003. She has served as the commission's vice president and president several times.

== Early life and career ==
Joseph was born in Brooklyn, New York. She was influenced by her father, a criminal lawyer and civil rights activist.

Joseph's first nightclub job was at Dynamite, a Brooklyn nightclub. Soon after she moved to the Electric Circus, in Manhattan and shortly after began working in the record industry for Aria Productions and MK Dance Promotions, a company founded by Tom Cossie and Mark Kriener. Her break in music came while working as a promoter for the Big Apple Band, which specialized in bar mitzvahs and weddings. The band was given a contract to write a song for a New York City promotional campaign, and it came up with "Dance, Dance, Dance" for the b-side. The group renamed itself Chic and the single, on Atlantic Records, was the first gold 12-inch disc. "I was the promotion person, the hanger-on... a couple of the hand claps on there are mine," Joseph said of her role.

Joseph became the National Director of MK Dance Promotions and went on to promote over a hundred disco records that went gold In 1979, Joseph joined Arista Records as their Director of dance music.

== San Francisco ==
Joseph relocated from New York City to San Francisco in 1982. She moved to help her friend Marty Blecman run Megatone Records; after the early death of his business partner Patrick Cowley from AIDS. Her background in the concert, nightclub and record business in New York City served her well in San Francisco. At Megatone Records, she was involved in the marketing and promotion of Sylvester. She also managed David Harness.

She became involved with AIDS activism organizations fighting the AIDS pandemic including hosting many fundraisers including the first leather subculture contests in San Francisco.

=== Club Townsend ===
In 1992, Joseph alongside Bill Camillo and Les Dirks took over the struggling Club Townsend. After the death of both Camillo and Dirks in late 1993 and early 1994, Joseph formed a partnership with Ty Dakota.

At the time, Sunday night gay tea dance Pleasuredome was happening. To complement, Dakota & Joseph founded Club Universe which became a dance club and entertainment venue and hosted shows for international stars like Grace Jones, Cyndi Lauper, Chaka Khan, The B-52's, Blondie, and disc jockeys from around the globe. Club Universe developed a reputation in the club scene for its ever-evolving and changing themes each week.

Club Townsend and its counterpart King Street Garage hosted clubs like Wicked, Futura, New Wave City, Club Asia, Club Q, Electric and live performances by Sammy Hagar, Blues Traveler, The Wallflowers, Third Eye Blind, Big Bad Voodoo Daddy, Reverend Horton Heat, Bootsy Collins, George Clinton and Parliament Funkadelic.

In November 2000, attorneys for the family of the late Jeffrey Goring, a San Jose man who died in February 2000 after collapsing on the dance floor at Club Universe, said they were filing a wrongful death lawsuit, complaining club employees waited too long to call 911 emergency services after Goring fell. Club officials denied the charges. The case was subsequently settled out of court and Goring was found to have no drugs in his system and had collapsed from an asthma attack; all parties in the lawsuit were bound to confidentiality.

=== Community event production ===
Joseph produced the dance stage at the Folsom Street Fair for many years and did the main stage production for the San Francisco Gay Pride celebration. She has also been a producer of the event International Ms. Leather.

== Entertainment Commission ==
Joseph was appointed to the Entertainment Commission by Mayor Willie L. Brown and took office 1 July 2003. She has served as the first Vice President 2003–2004 and the President of the Commission 2004–2005 and again as vice president for 200–2006. In 2007, she was elected as president again. Joseph started the San Francisco Entertainment Commission Academy, which holds interactive seminars to assist in the education and introduction of the nighttime entertainment economy.
