= International Mr. Leather =

International leather subculture event

- IML Wingman logo

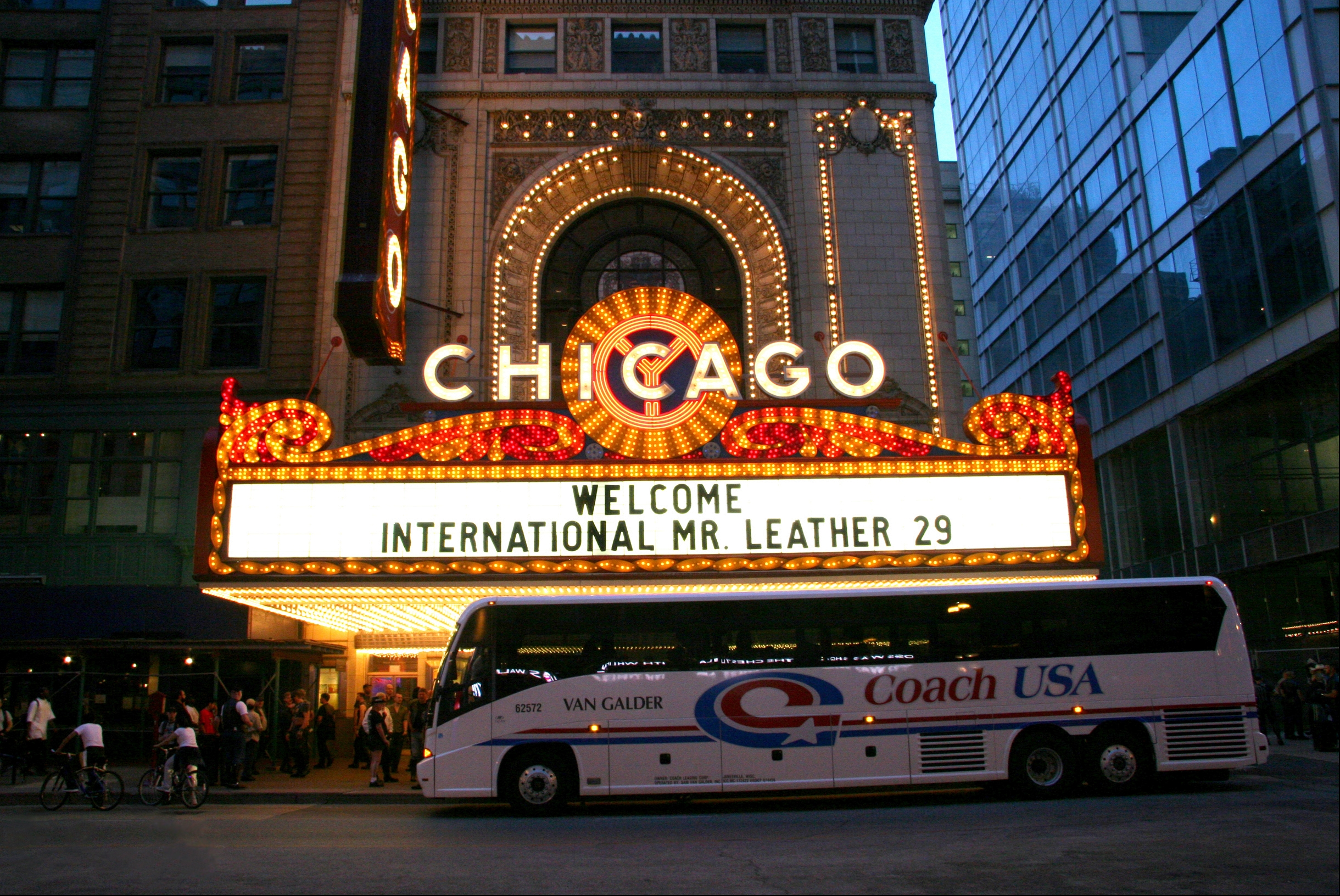
- IML 29 at the Chicago Theatre (2007)
- Nickname: IML; IMBB
- Status: Active
- Genre: leather; kink; fetish; BDSM
- Frequency: Annually, Memorial Day weekend
- Locations: Chicago, Illinois
- Country: United States
- Inaugurated: 1979
- Organiser: IMLBB
- Website: www.internationalmrleather.com

International Mr. Leather (IML) is an American multi-day convention and competition celebrating the leather, kink, fetish, and BDSM communities. Established in 1979, IML is held annually in Chicago, Illinois over the Memorial Day holiday weekend, drawing thousands of attendees from around the world. As of 2025, over 2,200 contestants from 28 countries have competed in the weekend's contest to earn the title of International Mr. Leather.

Events include speakers, socials, themed dance parties and a leather market. IML contestants are expected to participate in the weekend while also fulfilling contest-related duties. Contestants qualify for the competition by winning an approved leather contest organized by a bar and/or local or regional leather club, or by being sponsored by a leather-related business or organization.

Since 1993, the organizers of IML have also produced and hosted International Mr. Bootblack (IMBB), occurring the same weekend as the main convention. IMBB was created to recognize the service and contributions of bootblacks to the leather and BDSM communities. In 2025, organizers adopted the name IMLBB as an umbrella term for both contests.

Proceeds from IMLBB benefit the Leather Archives & Museum.

== History ==
International Mr. Leather is regarded as the world's oldest continuously operating international leather and fetish event, even being dubbed "the granddaddy of all leather events." This contest, like all similar leather contests, was designed to be both an homage and a satire of women's beauty pageants, by giving men their own platform to admire and be admired, specifically by and for gay men involved in the leather and BDSM subcultures.

The forerunner of the competition was the Mr. Gold Coast contest held through the 1970s at Chicago's Gold Coast leather bar, owned by Chuck Renslow and his partner Dom Orejudos. This contest became one of the bar's most popular events, causing the need to relocate the competition to a larger venue by 1979, at which point Renslow decided to change the name to "International Mr. Leather". Flyers and promotional materials for this first IML were sent to every leather bar that Renslow and his associates knew of, not knowing if the historically regional contest would actually be able to attract a global audience. Fortunately, by the contest's second year, it would go on to actually live up to its name.

The inaugural IML competition took place May 18–20, 1979. The event was advertised as "a weekend you won't want to miss" featuring "some of the world's hottest men, representing leather bars and clubs across America and Europe" competing to win prizes worth $5,000 ($22,180 in 2025), including a motorcycle. Spectators could purchase a weekend package for $25 ($110.90 in 2025) that included a shirt designed by Orejudos (under his pseudonym "Etienne"), tickets to various parties and events, and coupons for local shops and bathhouses. Live entertainment included a performance from comedian Pudgy, along with music from Wacker Drive. Standalone tickets to the contest itself were priced at $10 ($44.36 in 2025). Orejudos also designed much of the contest's promotional material, including the iconic "Wingman Logo" still used today. David Kloss won the first contest, with Durk Dehner and Jesse Capello as first and second runners-up. Touko Laaksonen, a.k.a. Tom of Finland, volunteered to judge the contest, but had to drop out for health reasons (he later judged the 1983 contest).

Advertisement for inaugural IML contest (1979)

In 1980, IML introduced the Black and Blue Ball. In 1982, Glynn Sudbery served as press coordinator. By 1984, attendance had increased from 300 to 1,500. The leather pride flag was officially unveiled by its designer Tony DeBlase during IML 11 on May 28, 1989. The flag was quickly incorporated into the design of the sash awarded to subsequent contest winners.

The International Bootblack Competition was added to the IML program in 1993, intended to honor and showcase the hard work performed by bootblacks in the leather community. In 1998, the originally mixed-gender competition was spun off into two separate events: International Mr. Bootblack (IMBB), still produced by IML, and International Ms. Bootblack (IMsBB), now produced by International Ms. Leather, the female equivalent of IML held annually since 1987.

Since 2009, IML proceeds have been placed in a trust to benefit the Leather Archives and Museum (LA&M), the Chicago-based institution dedicated to preserving the history of the leather and fetish subcultures. Co-founded by Renslow and DeBlase, LA&M is also the official custodian of IML records and artwork.

The historic Congress Plaza Hotel has hosted IML guests and festivities every year since 2015, but the contest itself has often been hosted at offsite venues, such as the Auditorium Theatre across the street from the Congress Plaza. As a result of the COVID-19 pandemic and the resultant shutdowns and cancellations of large gatherings throughout the world, in-person IML events in 2020 and 2021 were cancelled. IML resumed in May 2022.

In 2025, the gay men's kink-focused hookup site Recon sponsored a pay-per-view live broadcast of the contest, the first time it had ever been officially broadcast live for a wider audience.

== Leather market ==
Each IML contest features a market for leather, kink, and LGBT-related vendors and organizations of all kinds. The market is open for multiple days and routinely draws thousands of visitors. Past and present participants—many of which co-sponsor IML—include Chicago Department of Public Health, Folsom Street Events, Howard Brown Health, Mid America Fists In Action, MIR, Nasty Pig, and Recon.

The leather market also hosts bootblacks in partnership with International Mr. Bootblack.

== Rules ==
=== Eligibility ===
As of 2024, to qualify for IML, prospective contestants must:

- Present as male and be 21 years of age or older.
- Win a preliminary contest or receive a primary sponsor.
  - Preliminary contest is defined as a bar, local, or regional leather contest that awards its winner entry into IML.
  - Primary sponsor is defined as "a bar, business, club or organization that specializes in the levi/leather, uniform, S&M, western, gear or related lifestyles.
- Submit an application and registration fee.

=== Contest criteria ===
Preliminary round

Contest finalists are selected following:

1. A preliminary interview with each of the nine judges, up to 8 minutes in length, are held in private (60% of the preliminary score).
2. Stage presence and personality at a Saturday "Pecs and Personality" event (40% of the preliminary score).

The judge's highest and lowest scores for each contestant on each criterion are dropped, and the contestant's remaining seven scores are tallied to determine the 20 contestants with the highest combined scores to proceed as finalists at the Sunday IML contest event. The only time that the dropped scores are included in the tally is when there is a tie for the 20th place; the contestants in question have their dropped scores included in the tally but if the stalemate continues then each of the nine judges must vote for only one of the two contestants. Preliminary judging scores are not carried forward. There are also two tally masters.

Final round

Each of the 20 finalists is judged at the Sunday IML contest on a scale from 0 to 100 in the following order:

1. Leather image (up to 40 points).
2. Presentation skills that include a contestant speech (up to 40 points).
3. Physical appearance (up to 20 points).

The highest and lowest scores for each finalist are dropped, the remaining seven scores are added together, and the top three scores designate the second runner-up, first runner-up, and winner, International Mr. Leather. A tie for the title is resolved by adding to the tally the dropped scores of the two contestants; if the stalemate continues then each of the nine judges must vote for only one of the contestants in question.

== Participating countries and territories ==
As of 2026, twenty-eight countries spanning six continents have officially fielded at least one contestant to compete at IML. Additionally, 44 U.S. states have provided contestants, as have the District of Columbia and Puerto Rico; the only U.S. states that have yet to field a contestant are Delaware, Maine, Montana, New Hampshire, South Dakota, and Wyoming. Similarly, there has yet to be a contestant representing the U.S. territories of American Samoa, Guam, the Northern Mariana Islands, or the U.S. Virgin Islands.

| Country | Region | First Competed^{A} | Wins^{B} | Win Year(s) | Ref. |
|---|---|---|---|---|---|
| Australia | Oceania | 1980 | 1 | 1980 | |
| Austria | Europe | 2018 | 0 | | |
| Belgium | Europe | 1996 | 1 | 2022 | |
| Brazil | South America | 2017 | 0 | | |
| Canada | North America | 1981 | 1 | 2006 | |
| Chile | South America | 2015 | 0 | | |
| China (Hong Kong) | Asia | 2019 | 0 | | |
| Colombia | South America | 2022 | 0 | | |
| Denmark | Europe | 2007 | 0 | | |
| Finland | Europe | 2017 | 0 | | |
| France | Europe | 2002 | 1 | 2011 | |
| Germany | Europe | 1987 | 2 | 1987, 2001 | |
| Ireland | Europe | 2000 | 0 | | |
| Israel | Asia | 1995 | 0 | | |
| Italy | Europe | 1990 | 0 | | |
| Mexico | North America | 2018 | 0 | | |
| Netherlands | Europe | 1993 | 1 | 1993 | |
| New Zealand | Oceania | 1993 | 0 | | |
| Norway | Europe | 2000 | 0 | | |
| Philippines | Asia | 2025 | 0 | | |
| South Africa | Africa | 2010 | 0 | | |
| Spain | Europe | 1988 | 0 | | |
| Sweden | Europe | 1985 | 0 | | |
| Switzerland | Europe | 2004 | 0 | | |
| Thailand | Asia | 1995 | 0 | | |
| United Kingdom | Europe | 1994 | 1 | 2003 | |
| United States | North America | 1979 | 38 | 1979, 1981-1986, 1988-1992, 1994-2000, 2002, 2004, 2005, 2007-2010, 2012-2019, 2023-2026 | |
| Venezuela | South America | 2019 | 0 | | |

^A Some IML contestants emigrated from countries that have not officially sent contestants to IML (or had not as of the time they competed). For instance, Venezuela-born Gary Iriza (Mr. Palm Springs Leather) won IML 30 in 2008, more than a decade before Venezuela officially sent a contestant (Mr. Leather Venezuela) in 2019.
^B Wins by contestants with international or nonnational preliminary titles (e.g. Mister Leather Europe, Mr. Gay Naturists International Leather) are attributed to the winner's country of residence.

== Winners ==
As of 2026, 46 contestants representing eight countries have won IML: the United States (38), Germany (2), Australia (1), Belgium (1), Canada (1), France (1), the Netherlands (1), and the United Kingdom (1).

As of 2026, the Mr Texas Leather and Mr Palm Springs Leather contests have each produced three winners - the most of any contest or sponsor.

The following is a table of IML contest winners. Note that winner's city as used in the table could denote either the winner's hometown, contemporary city of residence, or their preliminary title host city. For example, while 2019 titleholder Jack Thompson is credited as originating from Baltimore, Maryland, he won his preliminary title in Washington, D.C., and he emphasized in interviews that his actual hometown was Berkeley, California.

| Year | Class | Winner | Preliminary Contest / Primary Sponsor | Winner's city | Number of Contestants | Contest Location & Host Hotel | Ref. |
|---|---|---|---|---|---|---|---|
| 1979 | 1 | David Kloss | Mr. Leather Brig | San Francisco, California | 12 men from 6 U.S. states | Grand Ballroom of the Radisson Hotel | |
| 1980 | 2 | Patrick Brookes | Mr. Leather Australia | Sydney, New South Wales, Australia | 18 men from the U.S. and Australia, including 7 U.S. states | Grand Ballroom of the Radisson Hotel | |
| 1981 | 3 | Marty Kiker | Sponsored by The Brig & The Phoenix | San Francisco, California | 36 men from 3 countries, including 11 U.S. states | Park West | |
| 1982 | 4 | Luke Daniel | Mr. Drummer | San Francisco, California | 46 men from the U.S. and Canada, including 12 U.S. states and D.C. | Park West | |
| 1983 | 5 | Coulter Thomas | Mr. Texas Leather | Houston, Texas | 44 men from the U.S. and Canada, including 14 U.S. states and D.C. | Park West & Allerton Hotel | |
| 1984 | 6 | Ron Moore | Mr. Leather Colorado | Denver, Colorado | 30 men from the U.S. and Australia, including 13 U.S. states and D.C. | Park West & Allerton Hotel | |
| 1985 | 7 | Patrick Toner | Mr. Chaps San Francisco | San Francisco, California | 27 men from 3 countries, including 13 U.S. states and D.C. | Park West & Allerton Hotel | |
| 1986 | 8 | Scott Tucker | Mr. Philadelphia Leather | Philadelphia, Pennsylvania | 28 men from 13 U.S. states and D.C. | Park West & Lake Shore Hotel | |
| 1987 | 9 | Thomas Karasch | Mr. Leather Europe | Hamburg, Germany | 31 men from 3 countries, including 14 U.S. states | Park West & Days Inn | |
| 1988 | 10 | Michael Pereyra | Mr. Leather San Diego | San Diego, California | 42 men from 3 countries, including 19 U.S. states and D.C. | Clubland at The Vic Theatre & Executive House Hotel | |
| 1989 | 11 | Guy Baldwin | Mr. National Leather Association | Los Angeles, California | 48 men from the U.S. and Canada, including 21 U.S. states and D.C. | Clubland at The Vic Theatre & Executive House Hotel | |
| 1990 | 12 | Mark Ryan | Mr. Boston Leather | Boston, Massachusetts | 48 men from 4 countries, including 22 U.S. states | Clubland at The Vic Theatre | |
| 1991 | 13 | D Cannon | Mr. CC (of Palm Springs) | Los Angeles, California | 50 men from 3 countries, including 23 U.S. states and D.C. | Clubland at The Vic Theatre & Executive House Hotel | |
| 1992 | 14 | Lenny Broberg | Mr. San Francisco Leather | San Francisco, California | 56 men from the U.S. and Canada, including 22 U.S. states | Aragon Ballroom & Executive House Hotel | |
| 1993 | 15 | Henri ten Have | Sponsored by Motor Sportclub Amsterdam (MSA) | Amsterdam, Netherlands | 51 men from 5 countries, including 23 U.S. states | Aragon Ballroom & Congress Plaza Hotel | |
| 1994 | 16 | Jeff Tucker | Mr. San Jose Leather | San Jose, California | 43 men from 5 countries, including 20 U.S. states and D.C. | Congress Theater & Congress Plaza Hotel | |
| 1995 | 17 | Larry Everett | Mr. Oklahoma Leather | Collinsville, Oklahoma | 50 men from 6 countries, including 25 U.S. states and D.C. | Congress Theater & Hyatt Regency Chicago | |
| 1996 | 18 | Joe Gallagher | Mr. Leather New York | New York, New York | 49 men from 5 countries, including 25 U.S. states and Puerto Rico | Congress Theater & Congress Plaza Hotel | |
| 1997 | 19 | Kevin Cwayna | Mr. Minnesota Leather | Minneapolis, Minnesota | 53 men from 4 countries, including 23 U.S. states, D.C., and Puerto Rico | Congress Theater & Congress Plaza Hotel | |
| 1998 | 20 | Tony Mills | Mr. Mid-Atlantic Leather | Washington, D.C. | 62 men from 6 countries, including 23 U.S. states, D.C., and Puerto Rico | Congress Theater & Congress Plaza Hotel | |
| 1999 | 21 | Bruce Chopnik | Mr. Rocky Mountain Leather | Denver, Colorado | 52 men from 5 countries, including 22 U.S. states and D.C. | Congress Theater & Congress Plaza Hotel | |
| 2000 | 22 | Mike Taylor | Mr. Heartland Leather | Columbus & Cincinnati, Ohio | 60 men from 7 countries, including 24 U.S. states and D.C. | Congress Theater & Congress Plaza Hotel | |
| 2001 | 23 | Stefan Müller | Bavarian Mr. Leather | Munich, Germany | 63 men from 7 countries, including 26 U.S. states and D.C. | Congress Theater & The Palmer House Hilton | |
| 2002 | 24 | Stephen Weber | Mr. Texas Leather | Dallas, Texas | 66 men from 7 countries, including 27 U.S. states and D.C. | Congress Theater & Hyatt Regency Chicago | |
| 2003 | 25 | John Pendal | Mr. Hoist | London, England, United Kingdom | 58 men from 5 countries, including 24 U.S. states and D.C. | Congress Theater & The Palmer House Hilton | |
| 2004 | 26 | Jason Hendrix | Mr. D.C. Eagle 2004 | Washington, D.C. | 57 men from 6 countries, including 23 U.S.states | Congress Theater & Hyatt Regency Chicago | |
| 2005 | 27 | Michael Egdes | Mr. Ramrod | Fort Lauderdale, Florida | 52 men from 6 countries, including 25 U.S. states | Navy Pier Skyline Stage & Hyatt Regency Chicago | |
| 2006 | 28 | Bo Ladashevska | Mr. Leather Montreal 2006 | Montreal, Quebec, Canada | 52 men from 5 countries, including 18 U.S. states | Chicago Theatre & The Palmer House Hilton Hotel | |
| 2007 | 29 | Mikel Gerle | Mr. Los Angeles Leather 2007 | Los Angeles, California | 53 men from 5 countries, including 23 U.S. states | Chicago Theatre & The Palmer House Hilton | |
| 2008 | 30 | Gary Iriza | Mr. Palm Springs Leather 2008 | Palm Springs, California | 51 men from 6 countries, including 21 U.S. states | Hyatt Regency Chicago | |
| 2009 | 31 | Jeffrey Payne | Mr. Texas Leather 2009 | Dallas, Texas | 54 men from 7 countries, including 26 U.S. states | Hilton Chicago | |
| 2010 | 32 | Tyler McCormick | Mr. Rio Grande Leather 2010 | Albuquerque, New Mexico | 52 men from 10 countries, including 21 U.S. states and D.C. | Congress Theater & Hyatt Regency Chicago | |
| 2011 | 33 | Eric Guttierez | Mr. Leather Europe 2011 | Paris, France | 53 men from 7 countries | Harris Theater & Hyatt Regency Chicago | |
| 2012 | 34 | Woody Woodruff | Mr. Michigan Leather 2012 | Waterford, Michigan | 49 men | Harris Theater & Hyatt Regency Chicago | |
| 2013 | 35 | Andy Cross | Mr. San Francisco Leather 2013 | San Francisco, California | 51 men from 6 countries, including 24 U.S. states and D.C. | Harris Theater & Marriott Michigan Ave. Chicago | |
| 2014 | 36 | Ramien Pierre | Mr. D.C. Eagle 2014 | Washington, D.C. | 46 men from 5 countries | Harris Theater & Marriott Michigan Ave. Chicago | |
| 2015 | 37 | Patrick Smith | Mr. Los Angeles Leather 2015 | Los Angeles, California | 52 men from 9 countries, including 22 U.S. states and D.C. | Park West and Harris Theater & Congress Plaza Hotel | |
| 2016 | 38 | David "Tigger" Bailey | Mr. New Jersey Leather 2016 | Howell, New Jersey | 59 men from 8 countries, including 24 U.S. states and D.C. | Park West and Harris Theater & Congress Plaza Hotel | |
| 2017 | 39 | Ralph Bruneau | Mr. GNI (Gay Naturists International) Leather 2016 | Los Angeles, California | 63 men from 12 countries, including 23 U.S. states and D.C. | Auditorium Theatre & Congress Plaza Hotel | |
| 2018 | 40 | James Lee | Mr. Kentucky Leather 2017 | Lexington, Kentucky | 71 men from 14 countries, including 25 U.S. states and D.C. | Auditorium Theatre & Congress Plaza Hotel | |
| 2019 | 41 | Jack Thompson | Leatherman of Color 2019 | Baltimore, Maryland | 68 men from 13 countries, including 23 U.S. states, D.C., and Puerto Rico | Auditorium Theatre & Congress Plaza Hotel | |
| ~~2020~~ | ~~42~~ | Contest cancelled due to COVID-19 pandemic | | | | | |
| ~~2021~~ | ~~43~~ | Contest cancelled due to COVID-19 pandemic | | | | | |
| 2022 | 44 | Gael Leung Chong Wo | Mr. Leather Belgium 2020/2021 | Ghent, Belgium | 60 men from 11 countries, including 22 U.S. states and D.C. | Arie Crown Theater & Congress Plaza Hotel | |
| 2023 | 45 | Marcus Barela | Eagle LA Mr. Leather 2023 | Los Angeles, California | 54 men from 10 countries, including 20 U.S. states and D.C. | Auditorium Theatre & Congress Plaza Hotel | |
| 2024 | 46 | Jamal "Alpha Pup Savage" Herrera-O'Malley | San Francisco Eagle Leather Pup 2024 | San Francisco, California | 59 men from 9 countries, including 20 U.S. states and D.C. | Venue SIX10 at Spertus Institute, McCormick Place, & Congress Plaza Hotel | |
| 2025 | 47 | Rene Hebert | Mr. Palm Springs Leather 2025 | Palm Springs, California | 68 men from 11 countries, including 24 U.S. states | The Vic Theatre & Congress Plaza Hotel | |
| 2026 | 48 | Honey Davenport | Mr. Palm Springs Leather 2026 | Palm Springs, California | 68 men from 11 countries, including 22 U.S. states and D.C. | Riviera Theatre & Congress Plaza Hotel | |

^C In cases of regional, international, or non-geographic preliminary titles (Mr Midwest Leather, Mr SECC Leather, Leathermen of Color, Mr Leather Europe, etc.), participation is attributed to the contestant's country, state, and/or territory of residence.

=== Milestones ===
In 1984 Ron Moore became the first black man to win International Mr. Leather. In 1997, his sister Genelle Moore won International Ms. Leather, which made them the first siblings to hold international leather titles.

In 2010, Tyler McCormick became the first openly transgender man, the first wheelchair user, and the first person from New Mexico to win International Mr. Leather.

The 2012 contest featured two weddings as well as the contest's first pair of married contestants competing against each other.

In 2019, Jack Thompson became the first openly transgender person of color to win International Mr. Leather. His win also marked the first time black men won consecutive International Mr. Leather titles.

In 2025, Rene Hebert became the first bootblack to win International Mr. Leather.

== International Mr. Bootblack ==
The International Mr. Bootblack (IMBB) Competition runs throughout the IML weekend. Contestants are given a location in the IML Leather Market at which they perform bootblacking services. Weekend ticket package holders (as well as judges, contestants, and vendors) are each provided with a bootblack ballot which is redeemable for one shine by the bootblack of the voter's choice. Bootblacks are free to shine the boots of any person, regardless of whether that person has a ballot, although it is made clear that the ballots are the means by which the winner will be determined. Tipping is not required, but is quite common.

The bootblack contestants work during the Friday, Saturday, and Sunday of IML during the time that the Leather Market is open, a total of approximately 20 hours over three days. In previous years, the bootblacks were allowed to shine boots and collect tickets at all times during the weekend. Since 2001, the bootblack contestants have established a gentlemen's agreement at the start of the weekend that they will not shine boots or accept ballots except during the established competition hours. This agreement was conceived to give the contestants the freedom to take time to enjoy the weekend without feeling the pressure to always be bootblacking.

At its inception in 1993, the competition was called the International Bootblack Competition, and both men and women were allowed to compete. In 1998, it was announced that the competition would be changed to the International Mr. Bootblack Competition and that a separate competition solely for women would be held at International Ms. Leather. This change was made largely because it was commonly held that women had a significant disadvantage competing for ballots from IML's predominantly gay male attendees, who may favor bootblacks who they find attractive. Since 1999, competitors for IMBB are restricted to persons over the age of 21 who present as male.

During the Saturday contest, before the Pecs and Personality segment, each of the contestants for International Mr. Bootblack is required to give a speech to the contest audience, giving future patrons for the following day an idea of who they may like to vote for. The next day, during the Sunday contest, the IMBB winner is announced (along with the first and second runners-up and the winner of the Brotherhood Award, on which the IMBB competitors vote and which is roughly analogous to the Miss Congeniality Award from various traditional beauty contests). This occurs before the announcement of IML's winner and runners-up, after which all seven men may return to the stage for photos.

In recent years, largely because of coordination of the contest by David Hawks, International Mr. Bootblack 2000, the Bootblack Competition has begun to develop adjunct activities. An IMBB party is held in a hotel function room on Saturday night, offering food, music, and a silent auction, the proceeds of which go to the travel fund of the winner. Likewise, during the competition hours in the Leather Market, volunteers man a table to answer questions and sell IMBB Travel Fund pins, which also adds to the travel fund. These sources of revenue have provided the various contestants with significantly more money to aid their travel to distant events during their title years. The money is controlled by the contest coordinator, and any access to the funds must be accompanied by proof of the travel outlay.[10]

Starting in 2013, the IMBB contest has implemented a judging system to select the winner. Contestants are evaluated by a panel of judges on the basis of their technical bootblacking skills, how they present themselves on stage and in public and what they say in an interview with the judges. Ballot voting still makes up a percentage of the contestant's total score.

In 2019, Dutch bootblack Kriszly de Hond became the first primarily non-English speaking IMBB titleholder, as well as the first to originate from outside North America. These distinctions made him the first truly International Mr. Bootblack.

In early 2023, in the months leading up to the convention, the entirety of IMBB staff resigned from their positions, citing many years of mistreatment and dwindling interest in the contest. This mass resignation effectively made the occurrence of IMBB impossible until negotiations and compromises were agreed upon by the IML and IMBB staffs. The contest returned three years later, for IML 48 in 2026.

=== IMBB Winners ===
As of 2026, 29 contestants representing four countries have won IMBB: the United States (25), Canada (2), the Netherlands (1), and the United Kingdom (1).

| Year | Winner | Preliminary Contest / Primary Sponsor | Winner's city | Contestants |
|---|---|---|---|---|
| 1993 | David Morgan | D.C. Eagle | Washington, D.C. | |
| 1994 | William Shields, Jr. | Chicago Eagle & the Chicago Hellfire Club | Chicago, Illinois | |
| 1995 | Tim Cousins | D.C. Eagle | Washington, D.C. | |
| 1996 | Todd Nelson | The Cuff | Seattle, Washington | |
| 1997 | Driller | SF Eagle & Daddy's Bar | San Francisco, California | |
| 1998 | Matthew Duncan | Centaur MC | Washington, D.C. | |
| 1999 | Robert Ehrlich | D.C. Eagle | Washington, D.C. | |
| 2000 | David Hawks | Mid-Atlantic Bootblack 2000 (Centaur MC) | Washington, D.C. | |
| 2001 | Paksen Burrell | Mid-Atlantic Bootblack 2001 (Centaur MC) | Washington, D.C. | 8 |
| 2002 | Michael Lanzini | The Lure | New York, New York | |
| 2003 | Richie Chameroy | Daddy's Bar & Powerhouse Bar | San Francisco, California | |
| 2004 | Alan Tunstall | The Barracks Bar & Avatar Club | Los Angeles, California | 8 |
| 2005 | BooBoo | Great Lakes Leather Alliance & Laws Leather | Cleveland, Ohio | 9 |
| 2006 | Benjamin Palmer | PumpJack Pub & Priape Vancouver | Vancouver, British Columbia, Canada | 5 |
| 2007 | Spot | Great Lakes Leather Alliance | Lansing, Michigan | 5 |
| 2008 | Bootdog | Alameda County Leather Corps | Oakland, California | 5 |
| 2009 | McG | Bootblack Toronto 2009 | Toronto, Ontario, Canada | 6 |
| 2010 | Tim Starkey | Boston Ramrod | Boston, Massachusetts | 5 |
| 2011 | Jim Deuder | NYC Bootblack Roundtable, The Leather Man NYC, & Eagle NYC | New York, New York | 6 |
| 2012 | Nick Elliott | Oregon State Bootblack 2011 | Portland, Oregon | 5 |
| 2013 | Sammy Sklover | Oregon State Bootblack 2012 | Portland, Oregon | 3 |
| 2014 | Scout | Eros SF & SF Eagle | Oakland, California | 7 |
| 2015 | Bamm-Bamm | International Leatherboy 2012, SF Eagle | San Francisco, California | 6 |
| 2016 | Erick Joseph | Alaska State Bootblack 2015 | Anchorage, Alaska | |
| 2017 | Ryan "Pawlish" Garner-Carpenter | independent candidate | Cincinnati, Ohio | 3 |
| 2018 | Lucky Rebel | Mr. Oregon State Leather 2016 | Portland, Oregon | |
| 2019 | Kriszly de Hond | Mr. Puppy EU 2015, XXXLeather's House Bootblack | Zaandam, Netherlands | 4 |
| ~~2020~~ | Contest cancelled due to COVID-19 pandemic | | | |
| ~~2021~~ | Contest cancelled due to COVID-19 pandemic | | | |
| 2022 | Alistair LeatherHiraeth | Bootblack Europe 2020 | Swansea, Wales, United Kingdom | 3 |
| ~~2023~~ | Contest cancelled due to staff resignation | | | |
| ~~2024~~ | No contest held | | | |
| ~~2025~~ | No contest held | | | |
| 2026 | Atlas Rose | Route 66 Bootblack 2025 | Chicago, Illinois | 4 |

== Cultural impact and legacy ==
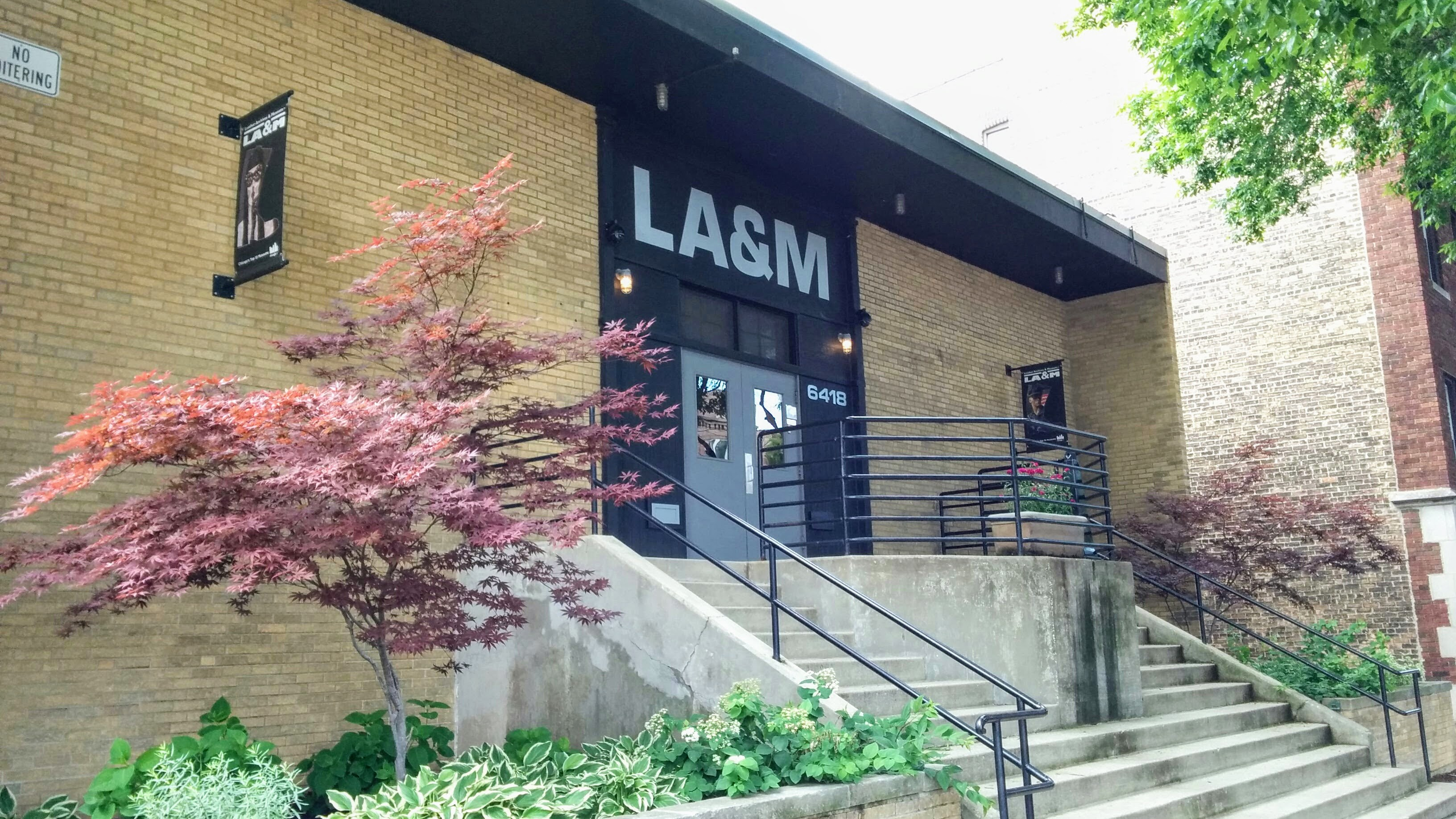
IML proceeds have been placed in a trust to benefit the Leather Archives & Museum.

According to the Chicago Reader in 2024, "IML has endured as an institution that serves the LGBTQ+ community by fundraising for grassroots groups as well as providing opportunities to gather and exchange goods, information, and kinship." IML has also improved the visibility and popularity of leather culture; past IML contestants and attendees have founded leather organizations, competitions, and businesses around the world, including National Leather Association International.

IML proceeds are placed in a trust to benefit the Leather Archives & Museum. The museum’s photos, videos, and oral histories chronicling IML (and International Ms. Leather) were featured in a 2015 documentary by Christina Court, titled High Shine: 15 Years of International Ms Bootblack.

=== Recognition ===
- In 1995, “Chuck Renslow – IML” was one of the recipients of the International Deaf Leather Recognition Award.
- In 1999 IML received the Business of the Year award as part of the Pantheon of Leather Awards.
- In 2007 and 2012 IML received the Large Event of the Year award as part of the Pantheon of Leather Awards.
- In 2010 IML was inducted into the Chicago LGBT Hall of Fame.
- In 2010, director Mike Skiff released the documentary film Kink Crusaders, which chronicled the history of IML as well as the 2008 convention. The film featured interviews with Renslow, as well as past IML winners David Kloss, Guy Baldwin, Jeff Tucker, Tony Mills, John Pendal, Mikel Gerle, and then-contestant Gary Iriza. The following year, an epilogue was added to document the historic win of Tyler McCormick.
- In 2018, IML was inducted into the Leather Hall of Fame during Cleveland Leather Annual Weekend 2018.
- On May 25, 2018, the Chicago City Council voted to honorarily designate a stretch of Clark Street in Uptown (between Winnemac Avenue and Ainslie Avenue) as "Chuck Renslow Way"; the city unveiled the new street sign during the anniversary of IML.

== See also ==
- International Ms. Leather
- Mister Leather Europe
- Leather competitions
- MIR contest
- Mr Gay World
- LGBT culture

== Footnotes ==
1. Bean, Joseph W. (2004). International Mr. Leather: 25 Years of Champions. International Mr. Leather, Inc. and The Leather Archives and Museum (1st ed.). Las Vegas: Nazca Plains. ISBN 1-887895-38-8.
2. Davolt, Robert (2003). Painfully Obvious: An Irreverent & Unauthorized Manual for Leather/SM. cover design by Steve Diet Goedde. Los Angeles: Daedalus Publishing. p. 212. ISBN 1-881943-19-4.
3. International Mr. Leather, Inc. "Contestant Application" (PDF). Archived from the original (PDF) on 2006-03-24.
4. "Leather Archives & Museum Announcement". Twitter. 2009-05-25.
5. "IML Makes History". Will Clark World. 2009-07-15.
6. International Mr. Leather, Inc. "Official IML Scoring Procedure". Archived from the original on 2005-12-22.
7. International Mr. Leather, Inc. "IML 2004". Archived from the original on 2006-03-24.
8. International Mr. Leather, Inc. (2005-05-30). Michael Egdes Named International Mr. Leather 2005 Memorial Day Weekend in Chicago. (Microsoft Word). Press release. Archived from the original on 2005-12-23.
9. "International Mr. Leather – Bootblack Contest". Archived from the original on 2006-03-24.
10. "International Mr. Leather – Past Bootblack Winners". Archived from the original on 2006-03-24.
11. International Mr. Leather, Inc. (2007-05-27). Mikel Gerle Named International Mr. Leather 2007. (Microsoft Word). Press release. Archived from the original on 2007-07-21.
12. "International Mr. Bootblack 2013 Press Release" (PDF). Archived from the original (PDF) on 2013-07-19.
13. Source for 1979 to 2003: Bean, Joseph W. (2004). International Mr. Leather: 25 Years of Champions. International Mr. Leather, Inc. and The Leather Archives and Museum (1st ed.). Las Vegas: Nazca Plains. ISBN 1-887895-38-8.
14. Source for 2004 to 2008: "International Mr. Leather - History". Archived from the original on 2009-02-20.
