= Bootlicker =

Bootlicker may refer to:

- The Bootlicker, a 1999 album by Melvins
- a user of sycophancy
- a form of boot worship in BDSM
- Derogatory term for Strikebreakers

== See also ==
- Kiss up kick down
- Authoritarianism
