= Bootblacking (BDSM) =

Service-oriented submission task performed within the leather subculture

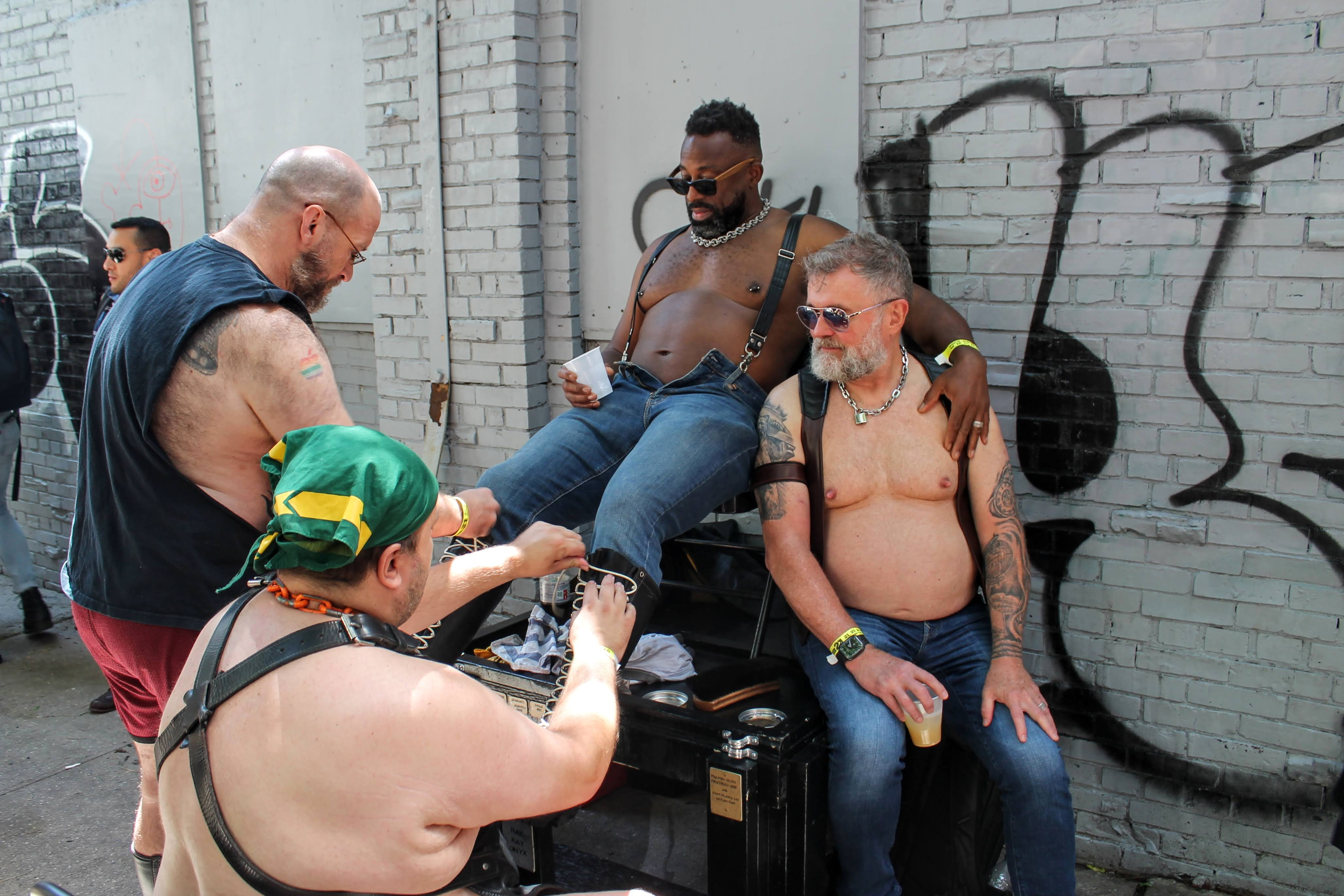
A man getting his boots attended to by two bootblacks

In the leather subculture and the BDSM community, Bootblacks take care of boots, garments, and other gear. With the establishment of local, regional and international bootblack contests in the 1990s and early 2000s, bootblacks have gained visibility as a subculture in their own right. Nowadays, bootblack stands as well as classes on bootblacking are common fixtures at events, contests, conferences and parties. Bootblacks are not only preserving the physical items (many of which have been gifted, earned or inherited) but are also collecting the stories of their wearers. Therefore, bootblacks play a central role in the oral history of the leather scene. While outsiders often link bootblacking to service-oriented submission, Bootblacks might take on any role in a BDSM dynamic.

== History ==
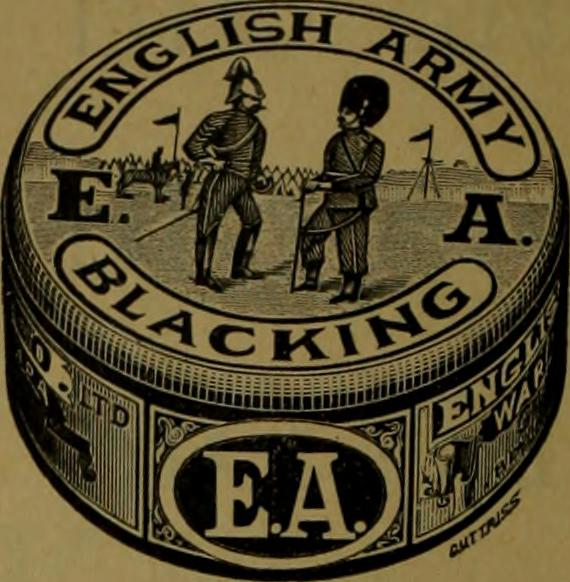
English Army Blacking from 1895

The term “bootblack”, meaning “one who shines shoes”, was first used in 1817, according to Merriam-Webster. The less common version "shoeblack" has been traced to 1751. Both probably stem from the term "blacking", a precursor of modern shoe polish containing lampblack, which was used to care for English soldiers' boots in the 18th and 19th centuries.

While the trade of shoe shining has been around at least since the age of the Industrial Revolution, the origins of bootblacking within the leather community remain unclear. Possible points of reference are military traditions of polishing boots, as well as shoeshine stands in public spaces, which could be found in many cities in Europe and the US before World War II.

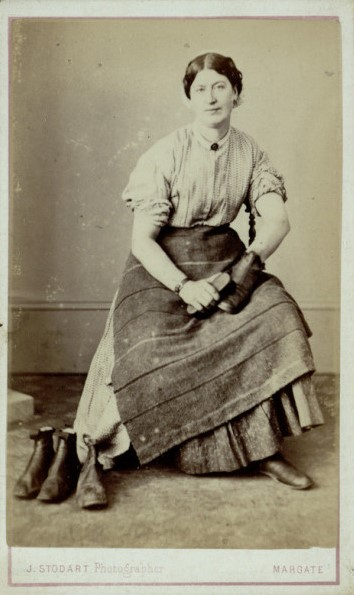
Hannah Cullwick cleaning shoes, 1864

The first documented case of shoe shining in a fetish context can be found in the diaries of Hannah Cullwick (1833 – 1909). Cullwick meticulously recorded the number of boots she cleaned on a monthly and yearly basis: For example, on Tuesday, July 31, 1860, she noted: “This is the last day of July. I have cleaned 83 pairs of boots.” Both in her own diary and in a poem by Arthur Munby, Hannah Cullwick is referred to several times as a "shoeblack". She cleaned hundreds each year, sometimes by licking them. She once told her lover Arthur Munby that she could tell where he had been by how his boots tasted:

I can always tell where you've bin by the taste o' your boots.

— Hannah Cullwick, Diaries

Bootblack stands as well as bootblacks operating in leather bars have been documented in the US since the 1970s. These included the Gold Coast in Chicago and the Ramrod in New York City. In later years, more bars adopted the custom, among others the AA Meat Market, the Chicago Eagle, and the D.C. Eagle. The Eagle in Chicago proved to be influential for international contests, as several future producers and titleholders (Harry Shattuck, IMrBB 1994 William Shields Jr., IMsBB 1999 Leslie Anderson) bootblacked there. Bootblack stands have also historically been part of leather events like Folsom Street Fair.

Bootblacks got more traction as an identity and a subculture in their own right in the 1990s, when Harry Shattuck founded the first International Bootblack competition at IML in 1993. Due to its popularity, the contest was continued until 1998 and split into International Mr. Bootblack (IMrBB), held at IML, and International Ms. Bootblack (IMsBB), held at IMsL, in 1999. The majority of regional bootblack titles have been more recent additions of the 2000s and 2010s. In Europe, the first regional bootblack competition, called European Bootblack, was held in Antwerp, Belgium in 2019.

A more recent development since the mid-2010s is the emergence of events centering bootblacks themselves and the sharing of skills.

The Leather Archives & Museum keeps multiple objects relating to bootblacks in its collection, including several bootblack titleholder vests, IMBB 2000 David Hawk's bootblacking chair, IMBB 1994 William Shields, Jr.'s bootblacking kit and vest, and a bootblacking chair that was used by IMrBB 1994 ‘Daddy’ William Shields Jr. in gay bars in Chicago, Boston, Providence and New York City between the 1990s and 2000s, and since 2014 is part of the museum's permanent exhibitions.

== Public bootblacking ==
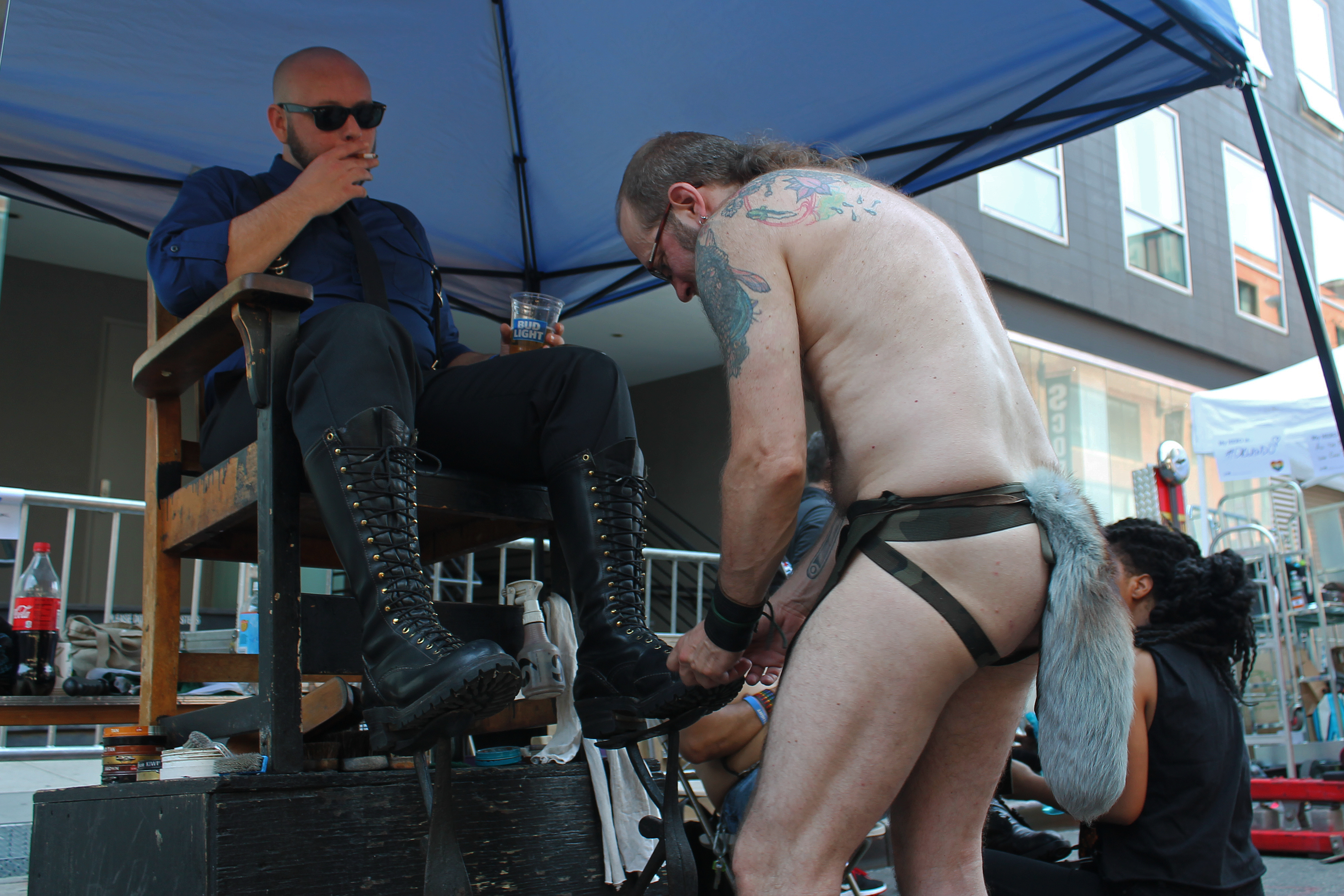
Bootblack working the stand at Folsom Street Fair

While bootblacking is an activity that can be done privately at home, many bootblacks enjoy working the stand in leather bars or at events, conferences, socials and contests. A booth usually consists of one or more elevated seats for customers to sit comfortably while the bootblacks clean, buff and polish their shoes, similar to professional shoeshine stands. Depending on the setting and the people involved, the experience can range from a pampering and a friendly chat, comparable to a visit to the hairdresser, to sensual or erotic play (e.g. in the form of boot worship).

== Techniques ==
The diversification of the kink scene has been accompanied by an evolution of gear, so that bootblacks today not only care for different types of leather attire, but also vegan leather, rubber, neoprene, and others. Each step in bootblacking requires patience, skill, and an understanding of the proper care of each material to ensure the items not only look aesthetically pleasing but are also well-maintained for longevity.

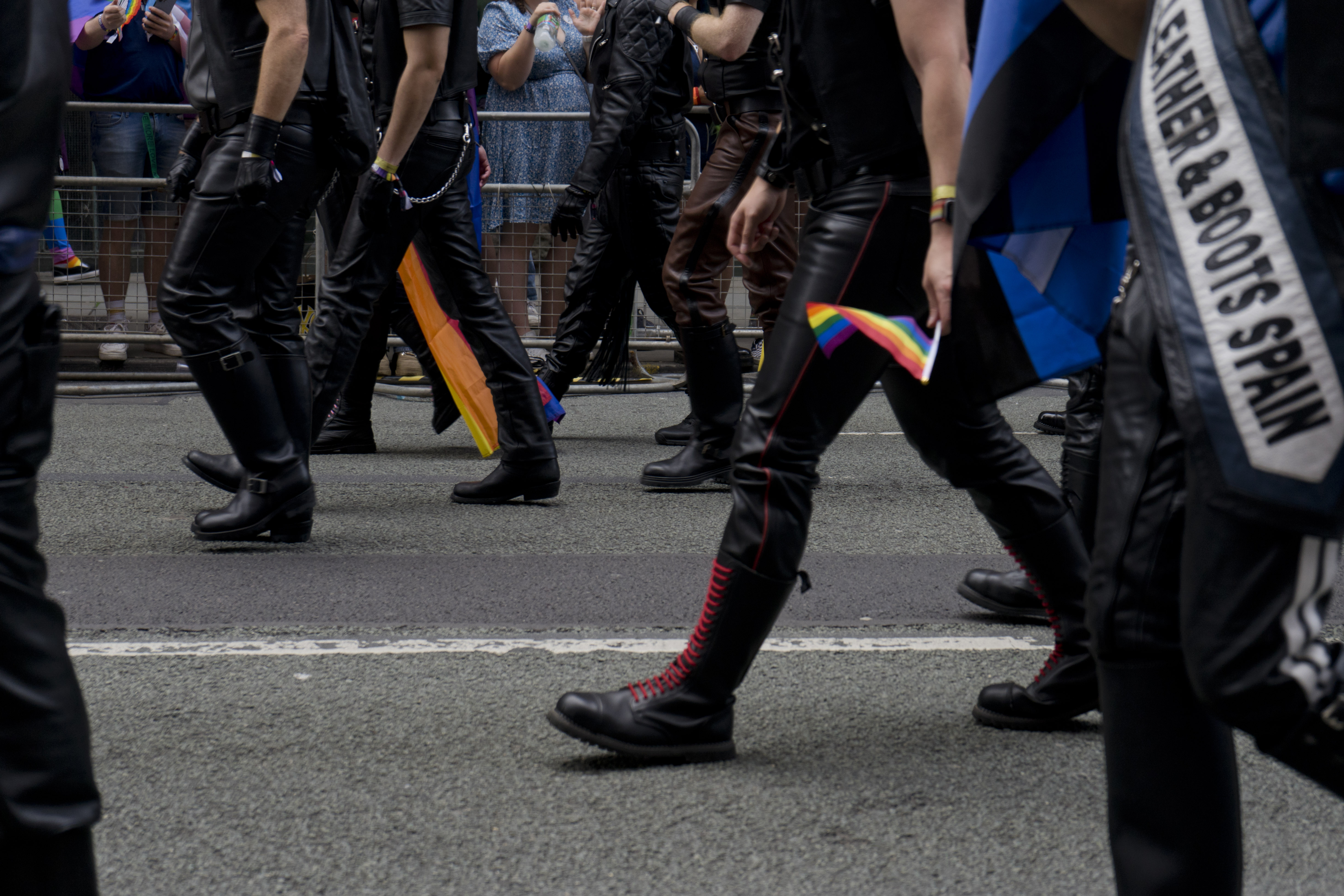
Leathermen with various types of boots at Manchester Pride

Still, the most common items during an average bootblack shift remain to be leather boots. Depending on the type of leather, these are either cleaned and conditioned or polished using horse-hair brushes and shoe polish. Many bootblacks are particularly proud of their mirror shine technique (also known as spit shine), which makes the toe cap shine with a glasslike high-gloss finish. A proper spit shine may involve multiple layers of wax and water or saliva, and precise buffing with a cotton cloth or nylon stocking.

Some bootblacks include boot worship and other forms of play and BDSM power dynamics as part of their service.

== Bootblack Pride Flag ==
The Bootblack Pride Flag was designed by Jesse ‘Spanky’ Penley in 2005. It was introduced to the public at the International LeatherSir/ International Leatherboy weekend in Atlanta, GA on October 6th, 2005. Using the Leather Pride colors, the diagonal stripes differentiate it from the leather pride flag. The flag only uses three stripes, two blue, and one white. The width of the stripes, signify the wide range of people who are, and appreciate boot blacks. The unisex boot stands for the non-gender specific nature of bootblacking. The large red heart positioned behind the boot, signifies the heart that the bootblack puts behind their boots.

== Titles and competitions ==
Bootblacks might participate in competitions, demonstrations, and events where their skills are showcased and celebrated. The most well-known bootblack competitions are International Mr. Bootblack (IMBB), International Ms. Bootblack (IMsBB), and International Community Bootblack (ICBB).

The oldest bootblack contest within the leather scene is the International Bootblack Competition that was founded by Harry Shattuck in 1993 at the International Mr. Leather event, which in 1999 was split into International Mr. Bootblack (IMBB/ IMBB) and International Ms. Bootblack (IMsBB). Harry Shattuck, who had been an IML contestant in 1979 and 1986, had been bootblacking at the Gold Coast and the IML Leather Market in prior years. Since the late 1980s, he had been trying to set up a bootblack contest at IML to get more representation for bootblacking in the leather scene. In 1993, he organized the first bootblack contest, which was one of the expansions and improvements of the 1990s at the ever-growing conference. The rules were simple: each IML package contained a ticket for a bootblack session and the bootblack who collected the most tickets over the weekend won. The winner and thus the first International Mr. Bootblack was David Morgan, sponsored by the D.C. Eagle. Due to the great popularity with visitors, the bootblack contest was continued in subsequent years. Before the separation, men, women and gender-nonconforming people alike took part in the gender-neutral competition. At least one woman participated in the very first competition in 1993, with more following in subsequent years. However, the titleholders were exclusively male until 1998, which can be explained by the competition's selection process and the male-dominated crowd. In 1999 the first International Ms. Bootblack was held at International Ms. Leather with Leslie Anderson as the first woman to win an international bootblack title.

IMBB 2000 David Hawk, who also produced the IMBB competition from 2001 to 2011, introduced several Innovations around the competition, including the First Shine, the sale of travel fund pins, and the IMBB party with a silent auction, for the purpose of fundraising.

The first self-identified bootblack to win the title of International Mr. Leather (IML) was René Hebert in 2025.

=== List of bootblack competitions ===
While many leather pageant competitions started between the 1970s and 1990s in the US, the majority of bootblack titles have been more recent additions of the 2000s and 2010s. Today, competitions are held internationally; among others in Europe, Australia and South Africa. The following table includes a non-exhaustive list of past and present bootblack competitions:

List of Bootblack Competitions
Contest	Organizer	Location	Established	Status	Reference
International Mr. Bootblack (IMrBB/IMBB)	IML	Chicago, Illinois	1999	Active 1999-2022 Resumes 2026	
International Ms. Bootblack (IMsBB)	IMsLBB	Piscataway, New Jersey	1999	Active	
International Community Bootblack (ICBB)	ILSb-ICBB, Inc.	St. Petersburg, Florida (2003–04) Atlanta, Georgia (2005) Dallas, Texas (2006–07) San Francisco (2008-2012) Dallas (since 2013)	2003	Active 2003-2019 Resumes 2025	
International Bootblack	IML	Chicago, Illinois	1993	reorganized into IMrBB and IMsBB in 1999	
European Bootblack	MSC Belgium	Antwerp, Belgium	2019	Active	
SA Bootblack (South Africa)	SA Leather	Capetown, South Africa	2017		
UK Bootblack		Birmingham, UK	2023	Active	
Eastern Canada Community Bootblack	ILSb-ICBB, Inc.	Toronto, Canada	2006	Inactive	
Australian Bootblack	Australian Leather	Melbourne, Australia		Active	
Sydney Bootblack	Sydney Leather	Sydney, Australia		Active	
Illinois Bootblack		Illinois			
Michigan Community Bootblack	ILSb-ICBB, Inc.	Michigan			
Gulf Coast Community Bootblack	ILSb-ICBB, Inc.	Dallas, Texas	2008		
California Community Bootblack	ILSb-ICBB, Inc.	California	2009	Inactive since 2012	
Central Plains Community Bootblack	ILSb-ICBB, Inc.	St. Louis, Missouri	2009		
Florida Community Bootblack	ILSb-ICBB, Inc.	Tampa, Florida	2011		
Great Lakes Community Bootblack	ILSb-ICBB, Inc.	Indianapolis, Indiana	2008		
Atlantic States Community Bootblack (formerly Mid-Atlantic Community Bootblack)	ILSb-ICBB, Inc.	Baltimore, Maryland	2005		
Northeast Community Bootblack	ILSb-ICBB, Inc.	Providence, Rhode Island	2009		
Northern California Community Bootblack	ILSb-ICBB, Inc.	San Francisco, CA	2007	Inactive since 2009	
Northwest Community Bootblack	ILSb-ICBB, Inc.	Seattle, Washington	2005		
Rocky Mountain Community Bootblack	ILSb-ICBB, Inc.	Denver, Colorado	2012		
Southeast Community Bootblack	ILSb-ICBB, Inc.	Atlanta, Georgia	2005		
Southern California Community Bootblack	ILSb-ICBB, Inc.	California	2008		
Southwest Community Bootblack	ILSb-ICBB, Inc.	Phoenix, Arizona	2006		
Northern Plains Community Bootblack	ILSb-ICBB, Inc.		2011		
Great Planes Community Bootblack	ILSb-ICBB, Inc.		2004	Inactive since 2009	
South Central Community Bootblack	ILSb-ICBB, Inc.		2005	Inactive since 2008	
Southwest Leather Bootblack	Southwest Leather Conference	Phoenix, Arizona			
Colorado Bootblack	Leather Colorado Foundation	Denver, Colorado	2012	Active	
Oregon State Bootblack	Oregon State Leather Contest	Oregon City, Oregon	2011	Active	
Alaska State Bootblack	Foxfinder Productions/Northern Exposure	Anchorage, Alaska	2015	Active as of 7/16/2026	

== See also ==
- Boot worship
- Bull polishing
- Leather subculture

== Bibliography ==
- Dominguez, Linda A. (2021). The Passion of Bootblacking. Agar ISBN 978-1-956096-04-0
- Andrews, Vincent (2021). The leatherboy Handbook III. ISBN 978-1-955748-03-2
- Cherielle RS (2013). Tales from the Chair: The Heart of a Bootblack. ISBN 978-1-4943-4445-0
- Wendell, Daddy (2012). Beyond Bootblacking. A Guide to Selecting and Caring for Leather Gear. ISBN 978-1-4700-5448-9
- McDiarmid, Andrew (2007). Bootblacking 101. A Handbook. ISBN 978-1-887895-69-9
