= Romeo (social network) =

Social network, instant messaging and dating community

ROMEO B.V.
- Website type: Geosocial networking
- Available in: English
- Owner: ROMEO B.V.
- Creators: Jens Schmidt and Manuel Abraham
- Revenue: Membership fee for PLUS accounts in certain countries.
- Website: www.romeo.com
- Commercial: Yes
- Registration: Yes
- Users: ▲3 million (2024)
- Launched: October 2002
- Current status: Active

Romeo (styled ROMEO, and until 2021 named PlanetRomeo) is a social network for gay, bisexual, queer and transgender people. The site was started as a hobby and was called GayRomeo in October 2002 by Planetromeo GmbH in Berlin, Germany. Initially only available in German, the site — and later, its mobile app — have evolved into an international platform.

== History ==
Initially, the site was available only in German and hence it used to have a majority of users being from German-speaking countries. The website and apps are currently available in six languages. The German-speaking community remains the largest community but not the majority. It has been operated by Planetromeo B.V. located in Amsterdam, Netherlands since September 2006.

In March 2009, GayRomeo acquired the online community Guys4Men.com, expanding the site's userbase into Asia.

In 2011, the site name was changed from GayRomeo to PlanetRomeo and in 2021 it was changed again to simply Romeo. The Romeo website, iOS app and Android app are commonly used mainly by the gay community to find friends, dates or love.

== Blue Pages ==
In Germany, due to its high number of registered users, Romeo is often called the "Gay Registry Office" (schwules Einwohnermeldeamt) or "The Blue pages" (Die blauen Seiten), referring to the well known telephone directories the yellow pages and the white pages. In a satirical reference to the Nazis' compilation of lists of homosexual men in the 1930s, the German newspaper "Taz" announced: "The pink lists are back".

== Features ==
=== Personal profiles ===
To access Romeo, users (referred to as Romeos) create a profile which can include a physical description, a list of sexual preferences, personal interests and one or more photographs of themselves. Sex workers and escorts can also advertise their services by creating their own profiles on the Hunqz section of the website.

=== Clubs and Guide profiles ===
Aside from personal messaging, Romeo offers users the chance to create Club and Guide profiles as another way of connecting with gay men sharing similar interests. For example, a bar or sauna creates a Club or Guide profile, to which Romeos either can join and or link their private profiles. The administrators of the Club and Guide profiles can send direct messages to their members. Club members exchange news or discuss various subjects in the club's forum or via a newsletter. Clubs also exist for supporters of political parties, members of religious groups and employees working in particular industries; some clubs have a more playful and sexual orientation. Any user can create a club-profile.

== See also ==
- Timeline of online dating services
- Homosocialization
- Tinder (app)
- Recon (app)
