= D.C. Eagle =

Gay leather bar in Washington, D.C., 1971 to 2020

- Interactive map of the D.C. Eagle area

General information
- Type: Gay bar, Leather bar
- Location: 904 9th St. NW (1971 original); 639 New York Ave. NW (1987-2014); 3701 Benning Rd. NE (2014-2020), Washington D. C., United States of America
- Coordinates: 38°53′42″N 76°57′04″W
- Opened: 1971
- Closed: 2020

The D.C. Eagle was a gay leather bar in Washington, D.C., operating from 1971 to 2020. It was relocated several times, with its final move taking place in 2014, to a building at 3701 Benning Road NE in the Benning neighborhood. It was one of the oldest leather bars to bear the name "The Eagle", which has long been shared by multiple unaffiliated bars around the world that all cater to gay leathermen, including the D.C. Eagle's unofficial successor in the city - the District Eagle, which opened in January 2025.

The bar periodically hosted many events and leather competitions throughout its history, including its own Mr. D.C. Eagle contest, two winners of which would go on to win the title of International Mr. Leather. It was also the primary host and sponsor of many bootblacks, three of which would become International Mr. Bootblack.

== History ==
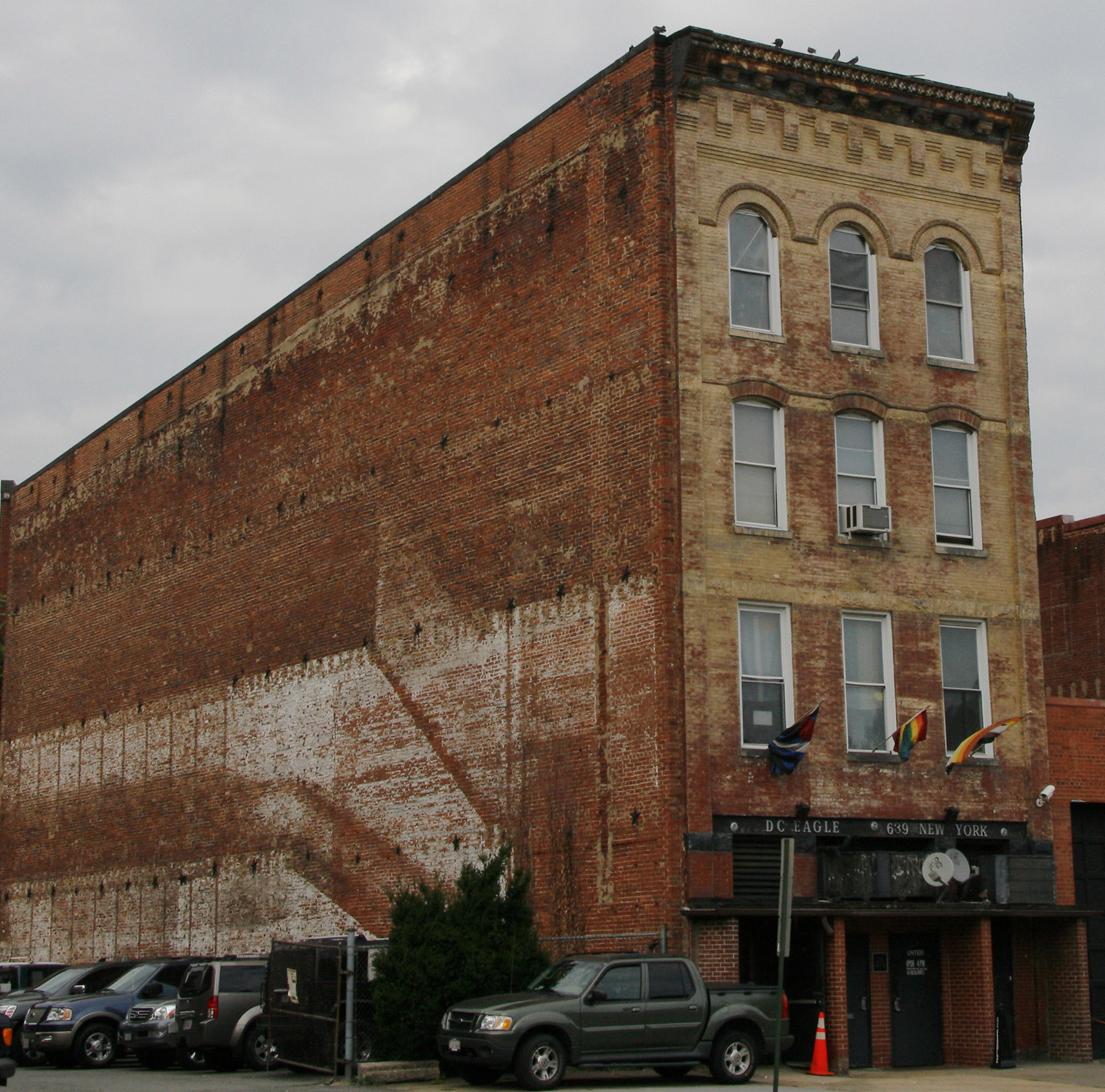
The DC Eagle at 639 New York Ave. NW, where it was located from 1987 to 2014

The roots of the D.C. Eagle can be traced back to the late 1960s, with informal dinners held by a group of local gay male motorcyclists and leathermen at a bar named Louis' on 9th Street NW, in D.C.'s Brentwood neighborhood. After the founding of the Spartans Motorcycle Club on April 3, 1968, the bar was renamed Louis' Spartan Lounge. Don Bruce, an early president of the Spartans, valued those dinners' importance in promoting community and brotherhood between the men, and he eventually decided the local leather clubs should have a space that was entirely their own. In 1971, with financial assistance from his brother Eddie and partner Dick McHugh, he purchased a property at 904 9th Street NW, opening it as a gay men's leather bar under the name D.C. Eagle. Due to city redevelopment, the bar was forced to move spaces several times over the following years, eventually finding more stable and long-term accommodations in 1987, at 639 New York Avenue NW in Mount Vernon Square. Among the bar's various venues and incarnations, this property would house it the longest.

In 2014, the Eagle was forced to relocate for what would ultimately be the final time. The new space, a warehouse at 3701 Benning Road NE on the eastern side of the Anacostia River, was a far cry from the previous venue's location in the heart of downtown D.C. It closed in 2020 after several months of financial difficulties, due to the COVID-19 pandemic, mismanagement, and the long-running issue of the venue's inaccessibility and distance from the rest of D.C.'s gay nightlife.

Since 1982, the Mr. D.C. Eagle competition was organized and hosted by the bar, eventually claiming to be "the longest running leather title contest in the entire country". The winner automatically qualified for the International Mr. Leather competition held annually in Chicago, Illinois. Over the 38-year history of the bar's contest, two of its titleholders went on to win the international competition: Jason Hendrix in 2004, and Ramien Pierre in 2014.

The practice of bootblacking has a long and storied tradition at the Eagle as well, partially evidenced by the bar's wooden bootblack stand, which at least dated back to the mid-1980s. The Eagle also sponsored a number of early International Mr. Bootblack titleholders, including the first IMBB David Morgan in 1993, Tim Cousins in 1995, and Robert Ehrlich in 1999. IMBB 1998 Matthew Duncan bootblacked regularly at the Eagle, although his contest run was formally sponsored by the Centaur MC.

Around 2002, a "Dyke Night" was organized to be regularly held on a weeknight, the bar's first event to provide a space for lesbians and other LGBT women. This and other subsequent events marked an attempt by the bar's owners to attract a wider clientele outside of the regular demographic of almost exclusively gay men. While this shift was likely at least partially motivated by the desire to increase earnings, it also helped to promote more diversity and inclusion among different segments of the LGBT community.

Throughout its history and relocations, the D.C. Eagle was consistently a popular venue for many fundraisers for the local community. One of the oldest and most well-known of these fundraisers was Scarlet's Bake Sale, held annually on the Sunday before Valentine's Day. First begun in the early 1970s, the event was traditionally held at the Eagle with very few exceptions. Members of the local leather community would prepare baked goods for the event, which would individually be auctioned off to potential buyers. This fundraiser attracted attendees from across the country, and all proceeds would go towards LGBT charities and organizations in the DC area. Another annual fundraiser was Eagle Wings, first held in 2004 onwards during the D.C. Eagle Anniversary Weekend in November.

In September 2018, the bar was embroiled in controversy when an employee was accused of assaulting former Mayor of D.C. and member of the D.C. Council, Vincent C. Gray, who was attending an arts festival hosted at the bar. No legal actions were taken, and the bar's owners issued an official apology two days after the incident.

In December 2018, the bar hosted the Leatherman and Leatherwoman of Color contests. Both of the winners, Jack Thompson and Velvet-Storm respectively, would each go on to win the International Mr. and Ms. Leather titles. Thompson won IML in 2019, and Velvet-Storm won IMsL in 2025.

Besides the Spartans MC, several local gay leather and motorcycle clubs displayed their club colors at the bar, with members of various clubs even being given unique metal beer mugs to use while on-site. Clubs that were hosted included the Centaurs, the Lost Angels, the Scorpions, the Shipmates, the FFA (Fist-Fuckers Association), Highwaymen TNT, the Nine Links, the Druids, and the Vulcans. Even in the establishment's final venue, these clubs were commemorated and honored by a stained-glass window on the back wall of the main bar, each of their crests etched into the glass.

List of Mr. D.C. Eagle titleholders
- 1982 - Daryl Grant
- 1983 - Mitch Curtis
- 1984 - Al Santora
- 1985 - Paul Moffett
- 1986 - Terry Boyles
- 1987 - (no contest held)
- 1988 - Glenn Corsini
- 1989 - Brad Wing
- 1990 - Chris Welch
- 1991 - Peter Zarcone
- 1992 - Tony Willging
- 1993 - Joel Gregorio
- 1994 - Raymond Cintron
- 1995 - Ray Hall
- 1996 - Jeff Gillies
- 1997 - Wayne Nesbitt
- 1998/1999 - Glenn "Skip" Mlaker
- 2000 - Gary Vandeventer
- 2001 - Darrell Moyers
- 2002 - Herbert Kaylor
- 2003 - Larry Barat
- 2004 - Jason Hendrix
- 2005 - Scott Jones
- 2006 - Bennett Long
- 2007 - Joseph Hurchick
- 2008 - Alex Holmes
- 2009 - John Harris
- 2010 - R. Derrick Thomas
- 2011 - Michael Kramer
- 2012 - Kevin Jordan
- 2013 - Nigel Williams
- 2014 - Ramien Pierre
- 2015 - Dan Ronneberg
- 2016 - Danny Kaylor-Hawkins
- 2017 - Grey Owl
- 2018 - Daniel Ferguson
- 2019 - Christopher Booth
- 2020 - Justin Sawyers

In 2019, in conjunction with the long-running Mr. D.C. Eagle contest, the bar hosted the first Ms. D.C. Eagle contest to recognize the women of the local leather community. This contest was only held twice before the bar permanently closed, with two women winning the title: Alyssa Durnien in 2019, and Mx. Symphonee Sym in 2020.

== See also ==
- Bear (gay culture)
- The Eagle (gay bars)
- Gay bar
- LGBTQ culture
