= Tony Mills (physician) =

American physician (born 1961)

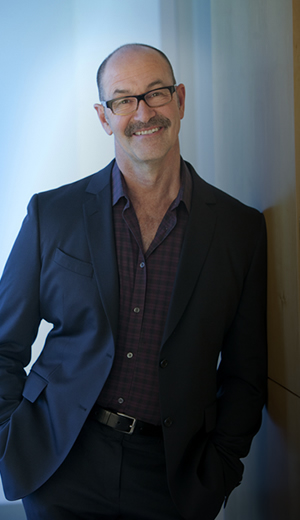
- Born: October 12, 1961 (age 64); Columbia, South Carolina
- Education: Duke University; Duke University School of Medicine
- Occupation: Physician
- Spouse: Sandro Antunes (July 2014)

Tony Mills is an American physician who specializes in the treatment of HIV and AIDS. He runs a general medical practice specializing in HIV care in Los Angeles and serves on the national board of the American Academy of HIV Medicine. In 2002, Mills joined the Clinical Medicine Faculty at the University of California, Los Angeles (UCLA). He is the executive director of SoCal Men's Medical Group, the clinical research director of Mills Clinical Research, and the president of the Men's Health Foundation.

In May 1998, he won the title of International Mister Leather, publicly coming out as HIV-positive one day later.

== Education ==
Mills received both his undergraduate and medical degrees from Duke University. He completed an internship in Internal Medicine, a residency in Anesthesiology and a fellowship in Cardiovascular Anesthesiology, all at the University of California, San Francisco.

- 1981 - B.A., Duke University; Durham, North Carolina
- 1984 - Fellowship, Cardiovascular Research Institute; University of California, San Francisco
- 1986 - M.D., Duke University School of Medicine; Durham, North Carolina
- 1987 - Internship in Internal Medicine; University of California, San Francisco
- 1989 - Residency in Anesthesiology; University of California, San Francisco
- 1990 - Fellowship in Cardiovascular Anesthesiology; University of California, San Francisco

== Early career ==
Mills graduated from Duke University School of Medicine and was awarded both the Stanley Sarnoff Fellowship Award in Cardiovascular Research and the Eugene Stead Research Award. He began his clinical practice in 1991 at Columbia Presbyterian Medical Center in New York City, concentrating on heart transplantation and cardiovascular research.

In 1994, Mills was named Chief of Pediatric Cardiac Anesthesiology at the University of Miami, where he was actively involved in both the recovery community and in the gay community as an advocate for people living with HIV.

== HIV care ==
In 1999, he moved to Los Angeles and opened a general medical practice specializing in HIV care. He was certified as an HIV specialist by the American Academy of HIV Medicine in 2000 and currently serves on both the California Board and the National Board of the AAHIVM. In 2002, Mills joined the Clinical Medicine Faculty at UCLA where he works actively with residents and fellows and is a frequent lecturer.

Mills is a member of many professional societies including; the Infectious Disease Society of America, International AIDS Society, IAS-USA, and the American Academy of HIV Medicine. He is the executive director of SoCal Men's Medical Group, the clinical research director of Mills Clinical Research, and the president of the Men's Health Foundation. He is the current editor of HIV Treatment News and is a frequent contributor to other HIV-related publications.

== International Mister Leather ==
In May 1998, having previously won the regional title of Mister Mid-Atlantic Leather, Mills won the International Mister Leather contest. Since winning the IML contest, Mills has been featured in the documentaries Beyond Vanilla and Mr. Leather. He has also been a model for the COLT Studio Group.
