= Glynn Sudbery =

American gay activist (1942–1984)

Glynn "Sudsy" Sudbery
- Born: Glynn Orville Sudbery; June 27, 1942; Metairie, Louisiana, U.S.
- Died: March 11, 1984 (aged 41); Chicago, Illinois, U.S.

Glynn Orville "Sudsy" Sudbery (June 27, 1942 – March 11, 1984) was an American gay activist.

== Life ==
Sudbery was born on June 27, 1942, in Metairie, Louisiana to Glen John Sudbery and Katherine Mayeaux Sudbery. He graduated from East Jefferson High School in 1960 and then enrolled at Louisiana State University in Baton Rouge.

Sudbery served in the United States Navy from 1965 to 1967. He served as a delegate for Edmund S. Muskie at the 1972 Democratic National Convention. He worked as campaign manager for Dawn Clark Netsch in 1974 and as the executive director of the Independent Precinct Organization. In his free time, he and Dave Vanderah, with whom Sudbery shared a home, were avid gardeners.

Sudbery left politics in the 1970s to devote his focus to Chicago's LGBT community. He volunteered at Howard Brown Health Center, co-edited Gay Chicago News with Donovan Ash, and was active in Chicago's leather and fisting scenes. In 1978, Sudbery co-founded Mid America Fists In Action (MAFIA) and served as its first president. In 1982, he volunteered as press coordinator for International Mr. Leather. Sudbery was also a friend of the Chicago Hellfire Club.

Sudbery educated Netsch about HIV/AIDS and helped inspire her efforts to secure state funding to address the HIV/AIDS crisis. He died in 1984 from AIDS-related complications. He is interred at Garden of Memories cemetery in Metairie.

Each year since his death, the IVI-IPO has bestowed the Glynn Sudbery Award to honor activists and leaders who identify with and support the LGBT community. MAFIA also established an award in his honor. Sudbery is also commemorated with two patches in the AIDS Memorial Quilt.
