= Nasty Pig =

American men's fashion brand

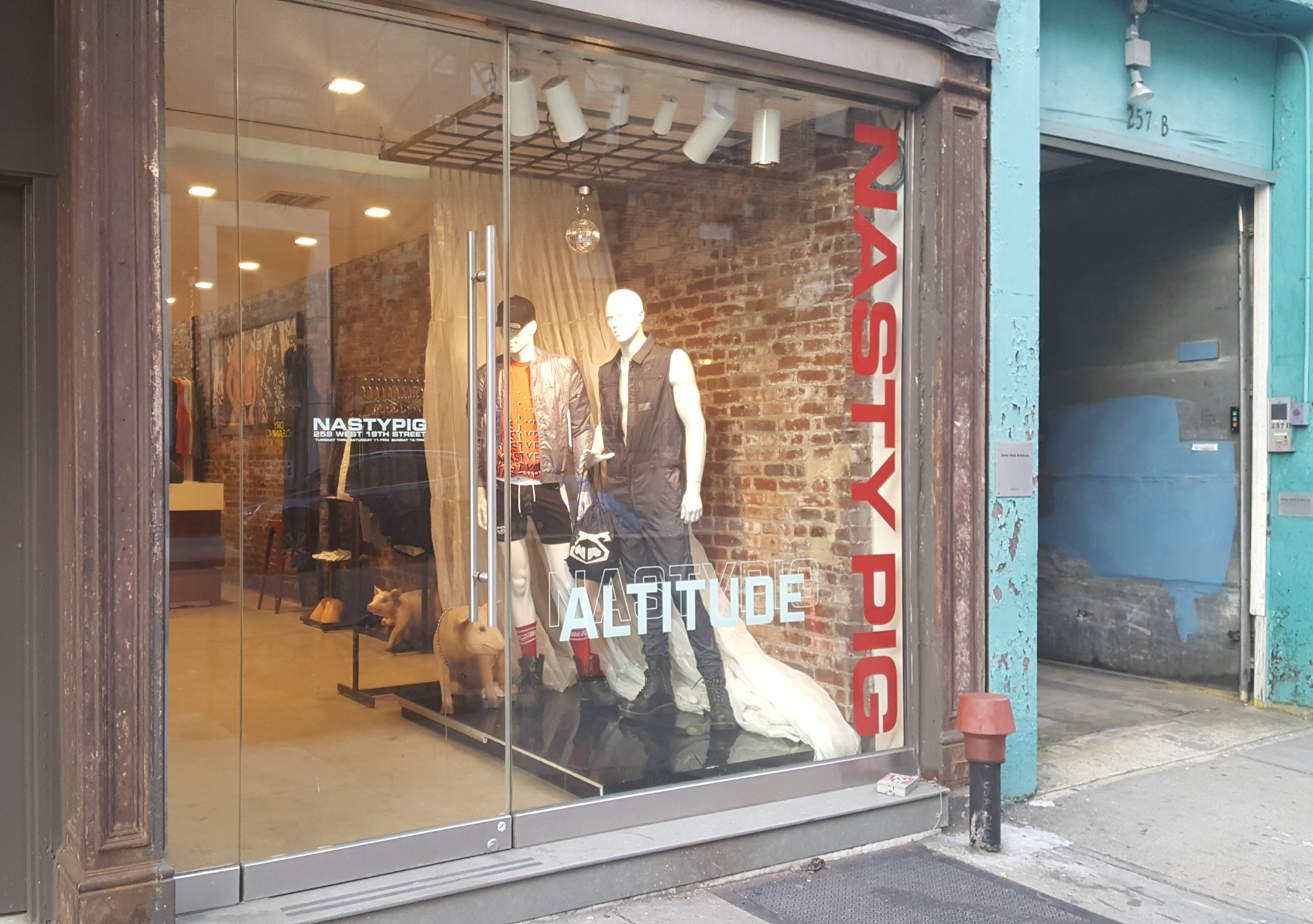
- Exterior of Nasty Pig's flagship store in Chelsea, Manhattan, in 2020
- Founded: October 31, 1994; 31 years ago in New York City, U.S.
- Founders: Frederick Kearney; David Lauterstein
- Headquarters: 259 W. 19th Street, New York City, New York, U.S.
- Key people: Frederick Kearney (Creative director); David Lauterstein (CEO)
- Number of employees: 12 (2017)
- Website: store.nastypig.com

Nasty Pig is an American men's fashion brand, based in New York City. The gay-owned company was founded in 1994 by Frederick Kearney and David Lauterstein, who serve as creative director and chief executive officer, respectively.

Nasty Pig initially focused on sportswear catering to the leather subcultures and has expanded into a full clothing line including underwear, jockstraps, jeans, shorts, T-shirts, and swimwear. Nasty Pig ranked on the Inc. 5000 in 2013 and moved into its current flagship store in Chelsea, Manhattan in 2014.

== Description ==
Nasty Pig originally focused on sportswear catering to the leather subculture. The gay-owned brand has since expanded into a full clothing line, including underwear, jockstraps, jeans, shorts, T-shirts, and swimwear, among other accessories, and mostly targets gay men. Sexual fetishism remains an influence; Nasty Pig has carried bondage harnesses and straps, as well as rubber jockstraps and bedding. The company has also sold silk woven neckties displaying the brand's logo "intricately hidden within the weave of the material".

Out's Stacy Lambe has described the brand's aesthetic as "a refined combo of punk attitude, street graffiti, and high-tech materials". Michael Kleinmann of The Underwear Expert has called Nasty Pig a "masculine sportswear line with an unabashed fetish edge" and "a connection to a raunchy, sexual subculture of some kind". ChicagoPride.com's Ross Forman has described Nasty Pig as "the ultimate edgy clothing brand for the masculine, sexually self-assured male consumers", with "bold stripes and loud colors". The brand's motto is "fun clothing that gets you laid".

== History ==
We started Nasty Pig because we wanted to create a culture brand that would allow queer people to express their queer identity. In the early nineties so much of our community was defined by the AIDS crisis in one way or another. We wanted to offer something that celebrated our uniqueness as a people.

— David Lauterstein, Nasty Pig's co-founder and CEO

Nasty Pig Incorporated was formed on October 31, 1994, by partners Frederick Kearney and David Lauterstein, who continue to serve as creative director and chief executive officer, respectively. The couple met in New York City in 1993 and began selling "re:vision goggles" with refractive lenses to the Club Kids. Profits allowed Kearney and Lauterstein to start sewing and selling clothing from their West 23rd Street apartment. Nasty Pig, named after their dog Piggy, was created in response to stigmas caused by the HIV/AIDS epidemic. According to Lauterstein, the brand was influenced by New York City's hip hop culture and sports, including baseball, basketball, CrossFit, football, mixed martial arts, and weightlifting.

The couple's first "closet-sized" 72-square-foot store, called 're:vision', sold Nasty Pig T-shirts, rubber chaps and superhero sleeveless shirts, and vinyl pants, among other products. Nasty Pigs' first retail clients were the Leatherman and Mr. S in New York City and San Francisco, respectively. The brand grew nationally after being heavily featured at Chicago's International Mr. Leather, an annual fetish and leather conference and contest. According to ChicagoPride.com's Ross Forman, "Nasty Pig gained notoriety for its line of machine-washable Nasty Pig Rubber, highlighted by Nasty Pig Playsheets, and has seemingly gone wild from there. Nasty Pig quickly became the brand-of-choice for the young, fetish scene in New York – and spread worldwide from there." Nasty Pig became "the first sportswear company in their industry to sell branded jockstraps", and the brand's jeans line (NP Jean) became a "best-selling stretch denim style".

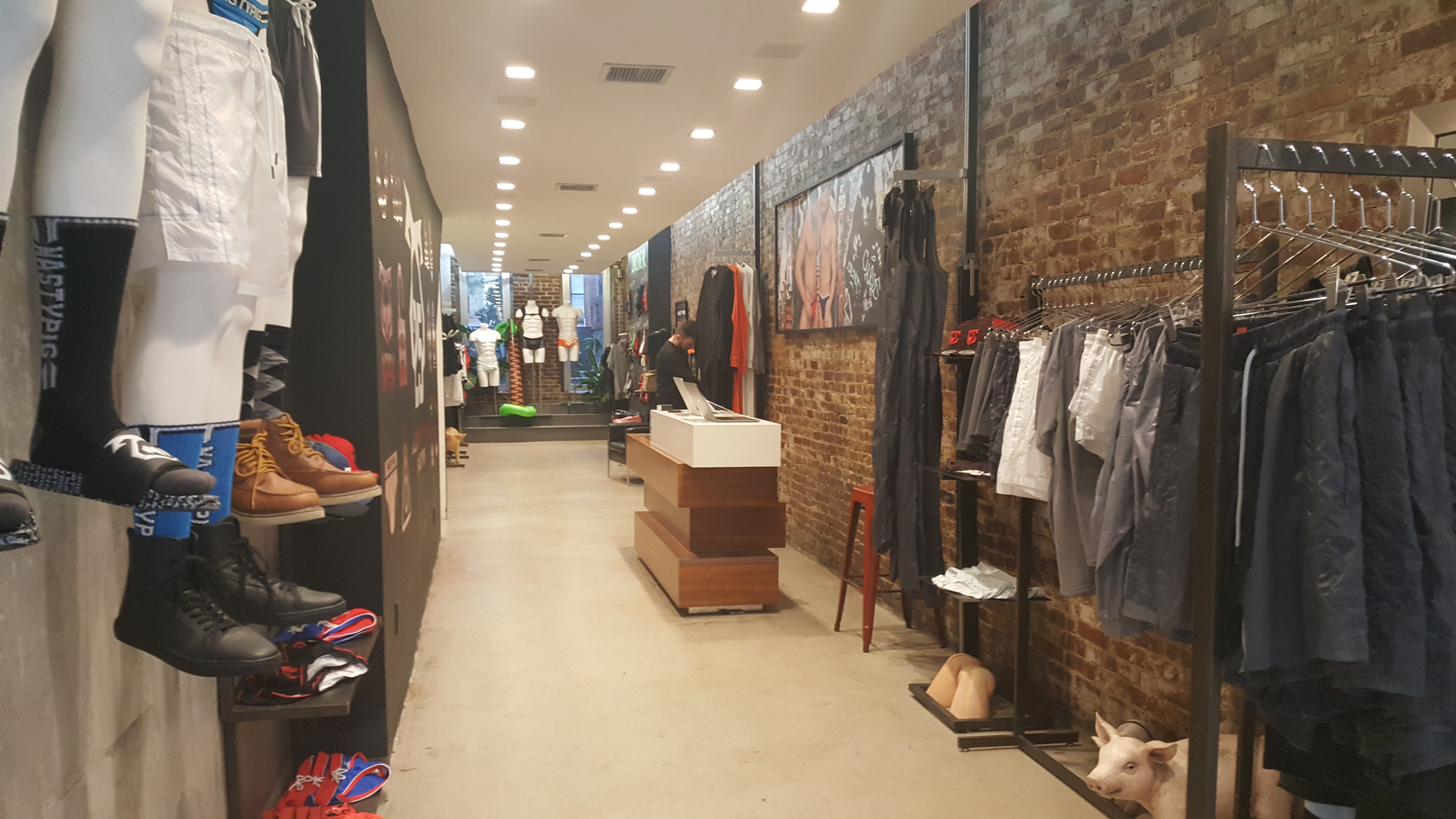
Interior of the flagship store, 2020

Nasty Pig ranked number 3,060 the Inc. 5000, Inc.'s list of the fastest growing U.S. companies, in 2013. The company's 2013 "video lookbook" featured Juliana Huxtable and several "gay nightlife personalities". Nasty Pig relocated to a larger flagship store on West 19th Street in Chelsea, Manhattan in 2014. In 2015, the company's 30-second "Give/Receive" advertisement was considered "too hot for TV" by Time Warner Cable executives. The commercial was scheduled to air on the Cartoon Network, Lifetime, Logo TV, and TBS, but was pulled after four runs on Logo in New York markets. Nasty Pig also advertised during American Horror Story: Freak Show in Los Angeles and New York, before launching its first national advertising campaign in 2015 during RuPaul's Drag Race.

The brand's products have been worn by James Franco, Lady Gaga, and Madonna. Nasty Pig and Versace outfitted Olly Alexander for his 2018 Paper magazine photo shoot. PinkNews, In 2020, Queerty and Slate praised Lauterstein for his advice for navigating the COVID-19 pandemic. He also helped the New York City Department of Health and Mental Hygiene update its 'Safer Sex and COVID-19' guidelines with more specific recommendations for dating and sex during the pandemic. Lauterstein was included in Crain's New York Business' 2020 list of "notable LGBTQ leaders and executives".

== Activism and impact ==
In 2013, Nasty Pig launched Shred of Hope, an auction of celebrity-designed "shredder" T-shirts benefitting New York City's Ali Forney Center, the largest LGBT community center in the U.S. Participants included Dustin Lance Black, Keith Boykin, Andy Cohen, Alan Cumming, Isis King, Adam Lambert, Bob Mould, Njena Reddd Foxxx, Mike Ruiz, JD Samson, Dan Savage, Jake Shears, Ally Sheedy, and Michael Stipe.

According to The Advocate, Nasty Pig grew "from a $50 investment to a global name in apparel — one that has had its own indelible role in influencing the worlds of kink, fetish, queer, and even high fashion". The magazine has described the brand as a "trailblazing menswear label". Ross Forman of ChicagoPride.com wrote, "[Kearney and Lauterstein] developed the first gay culture brand, and Nasty Pig hasn't just survived over the years, it has thrived." According to Out, Nasty Pig was among the first companies to "champion hairy, bearded models in its marketing materials, contradicting the era's" male beauty standards.

== See also ==
- Fetish fashion
- LGBT culture in New York City
- Underwear fetishism
