= Mid-Atlantic Leather Weekend =

American leather subculture event

- Nickname: MAL
- Status: Active
- Genre: leather; kink; fetish; BDSM
- Frequency: Annually in January
- Location: Washington, D.C.
- Country: United States
- Inaugurated: 1985
- Organiser: Centaur Motorcycle Club
- Website: www.leatherweekend.org

Mid-Atlantic Leather Weekend (MAL) is an American multi-day convention and competition celebrating the leather, kink, BDSM, and LGBTQ communities. Established in 1985, MAL is held annually in Washington, D.C. in January, drawing thousands of attendees from around the world.

Events include socials, dance parties, vendor markets, a leather fashion show, and the eponymous leather title contest.

== History ==
=== Origins ===
Mid-Atlantic Leather Weekend is organized and hosted by the Centaur MC (Motorcycle Club), which first convened in Richmond, Virginia on May 10, 1970 as a gay men's motorcycle club. The club quickly grew to include members from throughout the Washington, D.C. region and evolved into a Levi/leather social club.

Separately, in 1976, an impromptu cocktail party was thrown by Glenn Pitcher and other members of the Links MC staying at New York's Waldorf Astoria hotel, with the guests dressed in full leather. Beginning in 1977, this small semi-private event was repeated annually under the name 'Leather Cocktails'. As the event's popularity increased, it was hosted at bars and clubs including the Strap and the Eagle In Exile in Washington, D.C., the 2-4 Club in Philadelphia, and the Hippo in Baltimore.

By 1984, annual attendance had reached more than 500 people, overwhelming the original hosts. Tony Bachrach and Joe Johansen of the Centaur MC approached the hosts and the club acquired sponsorship of the event in order to continue its tradition as a community celebration.

In 1985, the event relocated to Washington, D.C. as the first Mid-Atlantic Leather Weekend, which introduced a leather contest while keeping a 'Leather Cocktails' event included in the multi-day schedule.

=== Recent events ===
In 2009, D.C. Mayor Adrian Fenty issued a proclamation formally recognizing Mid-Atlantic Leather Weekend.

MAL has been hosted at the Hyatt Regency Capitol Hill since 2011.

By 2024, event attendance reached at least 3,000 people.

In 2025, MAL featured a performance by RuPaul's Drag Race alumnus Gigi Goode. MAL 2026 included performances by drag queens Nymphia Wind and Plastique Tiara, as well as a special screening of gay biker romance film Pillion (2025), which had not yet been officially released in the United States.

MAL raises funds for LGBTQ+ and community organizations like the Leather Archives & Museum, the Transgender American Veterans Association, Rainbow Railroad, the Rainbow History Project, and the Bear History Project. In 2025, the event raised more than $185,000 for charitable causes. Nonprofit partner DC Health hosts a booth to provide medical resources on topics like DoxyPEP and services like STI testing to attendees.

== Title contest ==
=== Eligibility ===
As of 2026, to qualify for MAL, prospective contestants must:

- Be male and 21 years of age or older
- Self-identify as gay
- Reside in North America

Sponsorship or a title from a preliminary contest are not required to compete for MAL.

Each year's winner is expected to represent MAL as a contestant at International Mr. Leather that same year.

=== Winners ===
Year	Winner	Preliminary Contest / Primary Sponsor	Winner's city	Ref.
2026	Gage Ryder	Mr. Pittsburgh Leather Fetish	Pittsburgh, Pennsylvania	
2025	Jason Elliott	Mr. Virginia Leather	Chesapeake, Virginia	
2024	Ken Nelms	Mr. Virginia Leather	Norfolk, Virginia	
2023	Dan DeLuca	Mr. Pittsburgh Leather Bear	Pittsburgh, Pennsylvania	
2022	Duke	Mr. Mayhem Leather	Alexandria, Virginia	
2021	David Adam Spivey	Mr. Mid-Atlantic Leather	Pittsburgh, Pennsylvania	
2020	David Adam Spivey	Mr. Pittsburgh Leather	Pittsburgh, Pennsylvania	
2019	Emërson Anicëto	Mr. Pittsburgh Leather Fetish	Pittsburgh, Pennsylvania	
2018	Gerard Turner	ONYX	Gaithersburg, Maryland	
2017	Martel Brown	Mr. Pittsburgh Leather Fetish	Pittsburgh, Pennsylvania	
2016	Todd Leavitt	Mr. Leather Detroit	Arlington, Virginia	
2015	David Gerard	Mr. Connecticut Leather	Norwalk, Connecticut	
2014	Joe Birdwell	Mr. Pittsburgh Leather Fetish	Pittsburgh, Pennsylvania	
2013	Bryce Caine	Mr. Pittsburgh Leather Fetish	Pittsburgh, Pennsylvania	
2012	Matthew Bronson	Mr. Pittsburgh Leather Fetish	Pittsburgh, Pennsylvania	
2011	Doug Pamplin	Mr. Pittsburgh Leather Fetish	Pittsburgh, Pennsylvania	
2010	Matt Bamford	Mr. Capital Pride Leather	Washington, D.C.	
2009	Kip Hollar	Mr. Maryland Leather	Baltimore, Maryland	
2008	Chris Grasso			
2007	Gary Samuels			
2006	Scott Harris			
2005	Steve Ranger			
2004	Tug Taylor			
2003	Alvin York			
2002	David Baldwin		Baltimore, Maryland	
2001	Michael Marino		New York, New York	
2000	Tom Robinson			
1999	Dean Ross			
1998	Tony Mills			
1997	Mike Seimer			
1996	Mauro Montoya			
1995	Joe Morris			
1994	Richard Benoit			
1993	Frank Nowicki			
1992	Damien Sanzone			
1991	Kerry Richard			
1990	Spike Lewis			
1989	Dan Noel			
1988	Mitch Davis			
1987	Michele Rousse			
1986	Louis Bothwell			
1985	Jeff Vrtis			

== See also ==
- International Mr. Leather
- Leather competitions
