= Mid America Fists In Action =

American kink organization

- MAFIA "butthole" logo adopted in 2025.

- MAFIA promotional material, 1985.
- Abbreviation: MAFIA
- Formation: 1978; 48 years ago
- Founder: Glynn Sudbery; Donovan F. Ash; Roger Blaisdell
- Founded at: Chicago, Illinois
- Website: mafiaff.org

Mid America Fists In Action (MAFIA) is a 501(c)(7) nonprofit organization for men interested in fisting. The club was founded in Chicago, Illinois in 1978.

MAFIA provides opportunities for members and non-members alike to meet, play, and socialize. The club proclaims a commitment to "a vibrant, social, and affirming approach to fisting culture—one that prioritizes care, especially for bottoms, and champions intimacy, education, and celebration".

Membership is open to men age 21 or older, subject to approval by the board of directors. Prospective members must be sponsored by two current members in good standing.

== History ==
MAFIA was founded in Chicago, Illinois in 1978 by Glynn "Sudsy" Sudbery, Donovan F. Ash, and Roger Blaisdell. By July 1979, MAFIA counted members in 14 states and Canada. According to Ash:

M.A.F.I.A. was formed [...] in order to provide "protection" for those in the fisting scene. Not only just to supply a party facility, but to insist through sponsorship that new members fit in with the rest of membership.

MAFIA members initially met for "club night" at Touché, a leather bar then located on Lincoln Ave in Lake View. Club night soon caught the attention of the gay press: in 1980, Drummer reported that "a red bandana and a clean ass are de rigueur;" in 1983, Club Scene magazine reported that the gatherings included drawings for "prizes and surprises", and added "You're never quite sure what that group will do".

During the 1980s, club-sponsored fisting parties and socials were typically held in members' homes in Lake View, Uptown, Edgewater, and North Center.

MAFIA traditionally celebrated its anniversary with an annual general meeting (A.G.M.) and multi-day "Summerfist" celebration each Labor Day weekend. During A.G.M., the club elected the officer corps and board and announced recipients of the "Royal Order of the Sphincter" (ROOTS) award.^{A} In addition to fisting parties, Summerfist celebrations featured brunches, cook-outs, and banquets; biking events and beer busts; and games such as Find the Popper Top, "Oh My God! I'm Out of Crisco," and "Oops, My Douche Fell." MAFIA events have been open to non-members since the fifth anniversary Summerfist in 1983.

By the mid-1980s, the self-described "Men of MAFIA" included more than 150 members across 22 states, Australia, Canada, and West Germany. In promotional materials, MAFIA described itself as "the premiere fisting organization in the world".

In 1984, following the deaths of two members from AIDS, MAFIA developed procedures to reduce the risk of transmission: the club promoted sexual health education and safe sex recommendations in its monthly newsletter; increased social (nonsexual) programming; provided individual cans of Crisco, rubber gloves, and prophylactics at parties; and prohibited members with AIDS from attending fisting parties. MAFIA also supported community health organizations involved in AIDS research and caring for AIDS victims. The board of directors considered discontinuing fisting parties altogether, but ultimately decided that it could better protect members by providing education and a safer play environment.

Since 1994, MAFIA has hosted an annual "Black Hole" party during International Mr. Leather. The inaugural party featured 15 slings and an open bar.

Post-pandemic, the club has held monthly "Steamworks Invasion" and "Fire In the Hole" play parties; special event play parties for Palm Sunday, Market Days and MIR; and beach barbecues, bowling and bar socials at Sidetrack, the Chicago Eagle and other North Side fixtures.

MAFIA's surviving records are spread across various institutions including The ArQuives, Australian Queer Archives, Cornell University Library, History Colorado, Kenneth Spencer Research Library, and Leather Archives & Museum.

== Chapters ==
In the 1980s, MAFIA's bylaws allowed for the formation of chapters outside of Chicago. The primary requirement was that there be at least ten MAFIA members in the area (city, region, or state), who must sign a petition to the national board of directors. If the board of directors approved the petition, the chapter could organize. Chapters were required to submit local bylaws to the board of directors for review; ensure consistency between chapter and national bylaws; submit minutes and financial reports to the board of directors; and appoint a representative to attend board meetings. In return, the national office (Chicago) was responsible for providing support services, at cost.

Each MAFIA member was free to join a local chapter or remain a member-at-large affiliated with the national organization.

=== MAFIA-Denver ===
In 1984, members in Denver established MAFIA's first chapter ("MAFIA-Denver").^{B} Members selected the Tool Box as their home bar and designated The Ballpark (a gay bathhouse) as "the place to go between parties". MAFIA-Denver held its first fisting party at a member's home in Littleton, Colorado; by the end of summer, the chapter counted 25 members. The chapter held its first social in 1985.

In June 1987, the national board of directors suspended MAFIA-Denver due to "basic By-Law violations, not filing accurate reports in a timely manner, lack of interest in communicating with the National Board of Directors and generally failing to adhere to the design and operation of the organization". The chapter disbanded by 1989.

== Members ==
=== Founders ===
==== Glynn "Sudsy" Sudbery ====
Glynn Orville Sudbery was born on June 27, 1942, in Metairie, Louisiana. After moving to Chicago, he became active in the city's leather and fisting scenes. He volunteered at Howard Brown Health Center and served as press coordinator for International Mr. Leather in 1982. Sudbery served as MAFIA's first president until 1980. He died on March 11, 1984, from AIDS-related complications. Following Sudbery's death, MAFIA established the Glynn Sudbery Memorial Award to honor members who contribute to civic affairs, civil rights, or charity. He is interred at Garden of Memories cemetery in Metairie.

==== Donovan F. Ash ====
Donovan Fretz Ash was born on February 28, 1945, in Seattle. He spent his early years in McKenzie Bridge, Oregon and Juneau, Alaska, where he attended Juneau-Douglas High School. In 1976, after moving to Chicago, Ash became deeply involved in the leather community: he became a member of the Chicago Cossacks Brotherhood and an associate member of the Blue Max Cycle Club, Spirit of St. Louis Leather/Levi Club, Gateway Motorcycle Club, and Nimbus Cycle Club; he also became affiliated with the Mid America Conference of Clubs and European Confederation of Motorsport Clubs.

After co-founding MAFIA, Ash served on the club's board through at least 1985. Ash was also active in gay literary circles: he edited MAFIA's newsletter, co-edited Gay Chicago News with Sudbery, penned articles in other magazines promoting MAFIA, published a magazine called Chains of Brotherhood Around the World in the early 1980s, and assisted Tony DeBlase with the production of early issues of DungeonMaster.

MAFIA awarded Ash the Gene Simonar Memorial Award in 1986. Later in life, Ash moved to Fremont, California; Wilton Manors, Florida; and last to Clinton Township, Michigan, where he died on November 17, 2000.

==== Roger Blaisdell ====
Roger Newell Blaisdell was born on May 31, 1938, in Laconia, New Hampshire, where he attended Laconia High School. He served in the army from 1960 to 1962, after which he moved to Milwaukee, Wisconsin. He died on December 23, 1989.

=== Notable members ===
==== E. Gene Simonar ====
Emerson Gene Simonar—better known as Gene Simonar and Sir Gene—was born on August 22, 1927, in Green Bay, Wisconsin. He attended Bethel Academy in Arpin and later worked as a clerk for Economy Boys, Inc. in Green Bay.

Simonar represented Cycle MC—a New York-based motorcycle club—on the Atlantic Motorcycle Coordinating Council (AMCC). He was a charter member of Second City MC, the first gay motorcycle club in the Midwest, founded in 1965. He later co-founded and served as president of Chicago Knight MC, Chicago's second motorcycle club, in addition to co-founding the Mid-America Conference and Chicago Conference of Clubs.

Simonar died on March 14, 1980, in Chicago. He is buried at Fort Howard Cemetery in Green Bay. MAFIA established the Gene Simonar Memorial Award in his honor. In its 1986 newsletter, the club declared:

M.A.F.I.A's most prestigious award - The Gene Simonar Memorial Award - is named for a man who contributed immense time and energy to the success of M.A.F.I.A. during its formative years. This award is given to an individual who continues this tradition and has helped M.A.F.I.A. the most during the past year.

== See also ==
- Fetish club
- Sex club

== Notes ==
^AMAFIA traditionally inducted multiple members into the Royal Order of the Sphincter (ROOTS) each year. Selection was determined by previous ROOTS recipients, and each honoree received a trophy or pin. Until 1985, MAFIA bestowed the ROOTS award on members who "have shown both publicly and privately how much of a "pig" he was." In 1985, MAFIA announced:

Taking into consideration the awareness of AIDS and the clubs [sic] official stance on the subject, the ROOTS members decided to award this "prestigious award" not to the "pigs" but to those members who have "improved their 'ability' or 'capacity' the most" during the past year. We call it "education".

^BIn 1982, a fisting club calling itself the Knights of the Golden Eagle formed in Denver and announced plans to hold a "Winterfist" party in December; it is unclear whether this club bore any connection to MAFIA's Summerfist parties and Denver chapter or was simply coincidental.
