= Boot worship =

Adulation of boots in BDSM

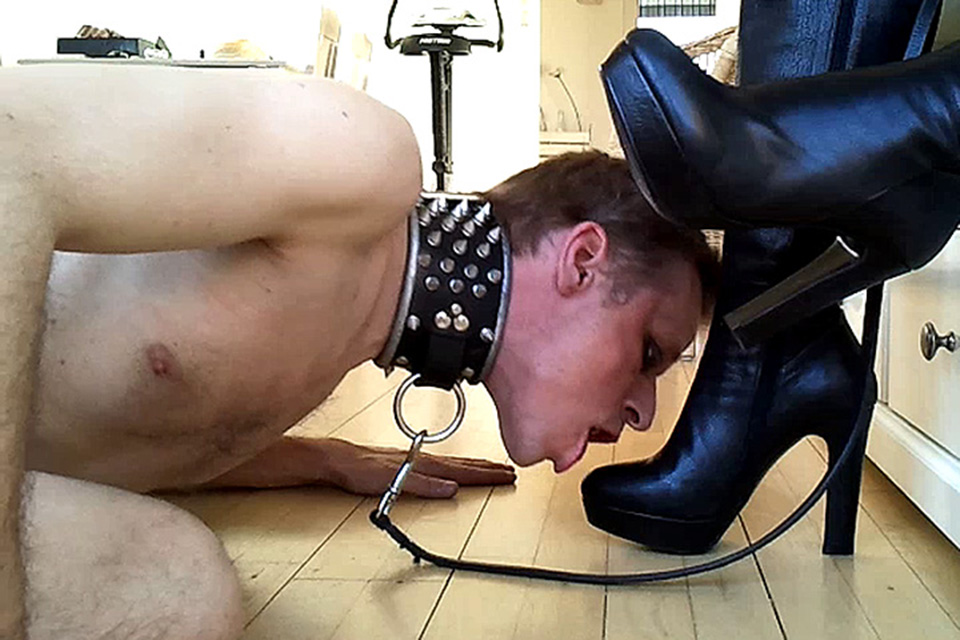
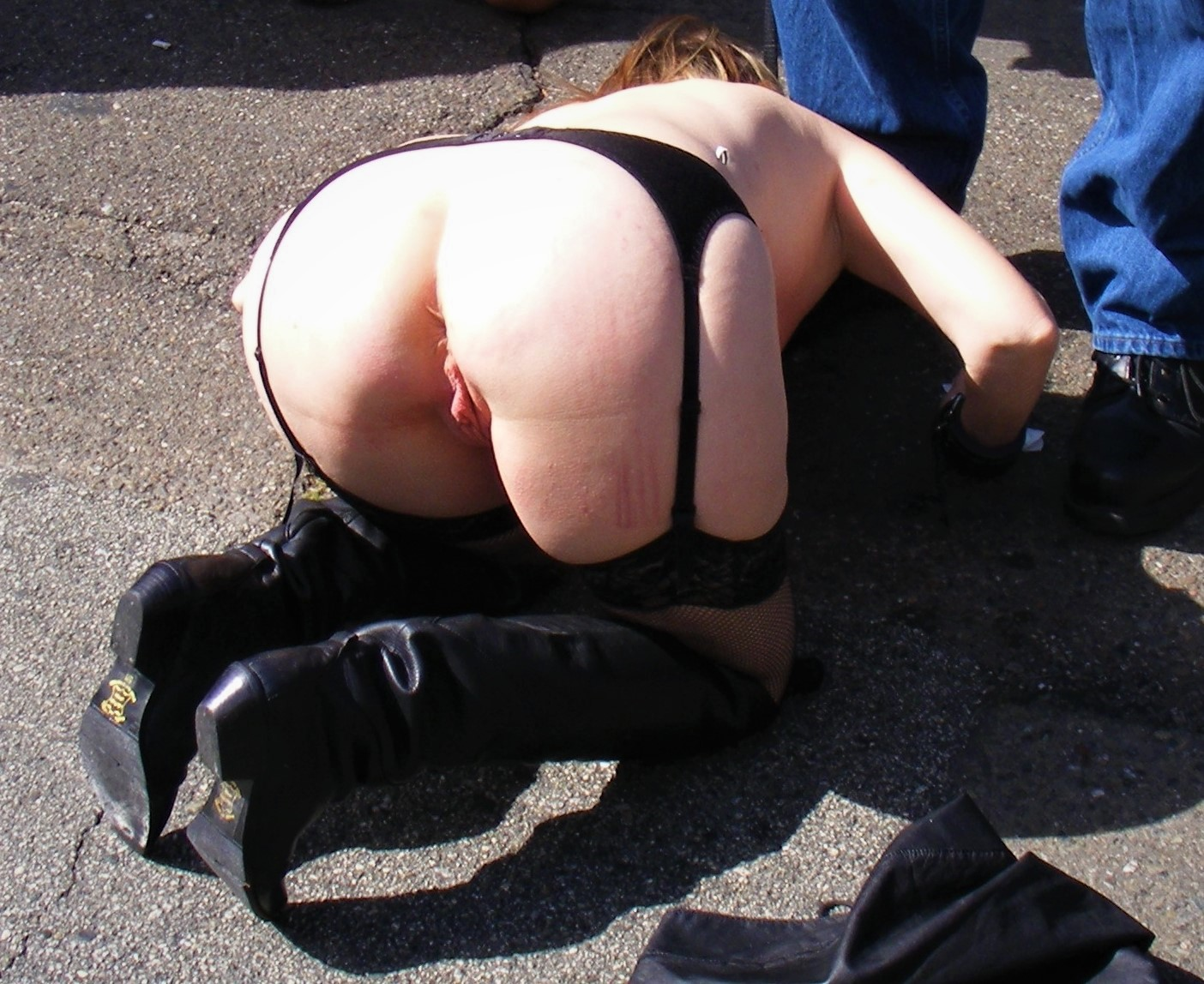
Submissive men and women licking boots.

Boot worship is the extreme adulation of boots in BDSM, usually carried out while the footwear is being worn by the dominant partner.

It is related to foot worship in a derivative way, in that the adulation may really be attributable to the proximity of the boots to their master/mistress. The foot is usually considered one of the "lowest" and least appreciated parts of the body, and it is a kind of humiliation to be kissing and licking someone's foot.

In “boot worship”, the humiliation goes one step further. The submissive willingly worships the dominant partner's boots, and often without even being asked to. This reverence for the footwear that encloses the dominant partner's foot is sometimes an expression of extreme devotion or loyalty, sometimes a concrete admission of inferiority or defeat, and sometimes both.

== Definition and variants ==
Boot worship may include sniffing or inhaling from worn boots, as well as licking, kissing or cleaning their exteriors by licking. Other activities include polishing of the boot, and chewing and eating of leather shoes or boots.

Sometimes, the dominant will choke the submissive by forcefully inserting their booted feet in the submissive's mouth. The dominant can also kick the submissive while wearing boots. The dominant can make the submissive eat food smashed by their boots, or even the food that sticks to the bottom of boots. Boots are also used by the dominant for ballbusting.

It may also consist, more passively, of the submissive lying prone and being "trampled" by the dominant partner. Heeled boots may lend themselves to sucking, in an approximation of fellatio, anal and urethra insertion. The dominant partner can also sometimes beat the submissive with the footwear while wearing it.

They can also have the submissive lying down in front of them, and then place their boots over the submissive's mouth, face, or body instead of the floor.

Bootlicking also has a political connotation of being a sycophant or having "deference to power undertaken entirely for its own sake, rather than out of fear or even material gain."

The following can be considered as more extreme situations. 1. The dominant may slap the submissive's face using booted feet instead of hands. This practice may be among the harder practices since the pain it causes is rather significant. 2. Full-weight-face-standing is another cruel play. As its name suggests, the dominant may stand completely on the face of the slave, crushing any resistance. 3. Multi-trampling. A group of sadistic doms could trample one slave at the same time. This could be big humiliation for the submissive when the slave is abused by more than one dom. Especially when the slave is naked, while the doms are all fully clothed. 4. Ignore. A group of doms could have a "night out" using a slave as boot/foot rest or carpet. This is a sort of objectification play. Although not much pain is induced in this situation compared to trampling, the slave could be psychologically (and willingly) abused to a large extent.

== See also ==
- Boot fetishism
- Bootblacking (BDSM)
- Foot fetishism
- Mysophilia
- Shoe fetishism
