= King Street Garage =

Coordinates: 37°46′44″N 122°23′28″W

The King Street Garage was a nightclub located at 174 King Street in San Francisco, California, near the present location of AT&T Park. It was directly adjacent to, and physically connected with, the Club Townsend, another famous nightclub on the other side of the block located at 177 Townsend Street.

== History ==
The King Street Garage hosted many clubs, notably the monthly New Wave City dance club which celebrated the best post-punk, synthpop, and new wave music of the 1970s and 1980s. Additionally the club held Club Asia, a queer Asian dance night created by promoter Larry Hashbarger, who later went on to open the nightclub AsiaSF. The club also offered Queer country western style dancing nights.

The San Francisco Drag King Contest was held at the club for many years.

Inside, King Street was a high cavernous hall with a large dance floor cornered by speaker stacks, with a spacious balcony level above it on three sides. Two staircases near the rear led up to the balcony level. There was a main bar on the lower level, and a small bar with some table seating on the balcony. The high back wall served as a giant projection screen for visuals. Often there were box platforms near the floor for people to get up and dance on. The DJ's control station overlooked the floor from the balcony near the rear of the club.

King Street Garage closed in June 2002, as the neighborhood was being disrupted and gentrified due to the presence of the new ballpark across the street. The site was later redeveloped as office space.

== See also ==
- DNA Lounge
