= Recon (app) =

Online dating application

- Developer: T101
- Initial release: 1999
- Operating system: iOS, Android, Web
- Type: Dating app
- Website: www.recon.com

Recon is a location-based online dating application and service specifically for gay men interested in fetish and kink. It launched as a website in 1999, and as an iOS app in 2010. It has 189,000 active users as of 2018.

Recon allows users to create a profile, communicate with other members through private messages, and filter members by location and interests. Recon started as a website, with some features, such as the ability to view a user's public x-rated photos, solely available on the website due to Apple's policy on adult content.

One notable feature is the ability to filter members by their declared fetishes and kinks. The broad categories include bondage, fisting, leather, rubber, bears, bikers, chastity, suits, feet, gunge, watersports, and sports gear.

Recon is owned and operated by T101, the company who also produce Fetish Week London.

== Events and publications ==
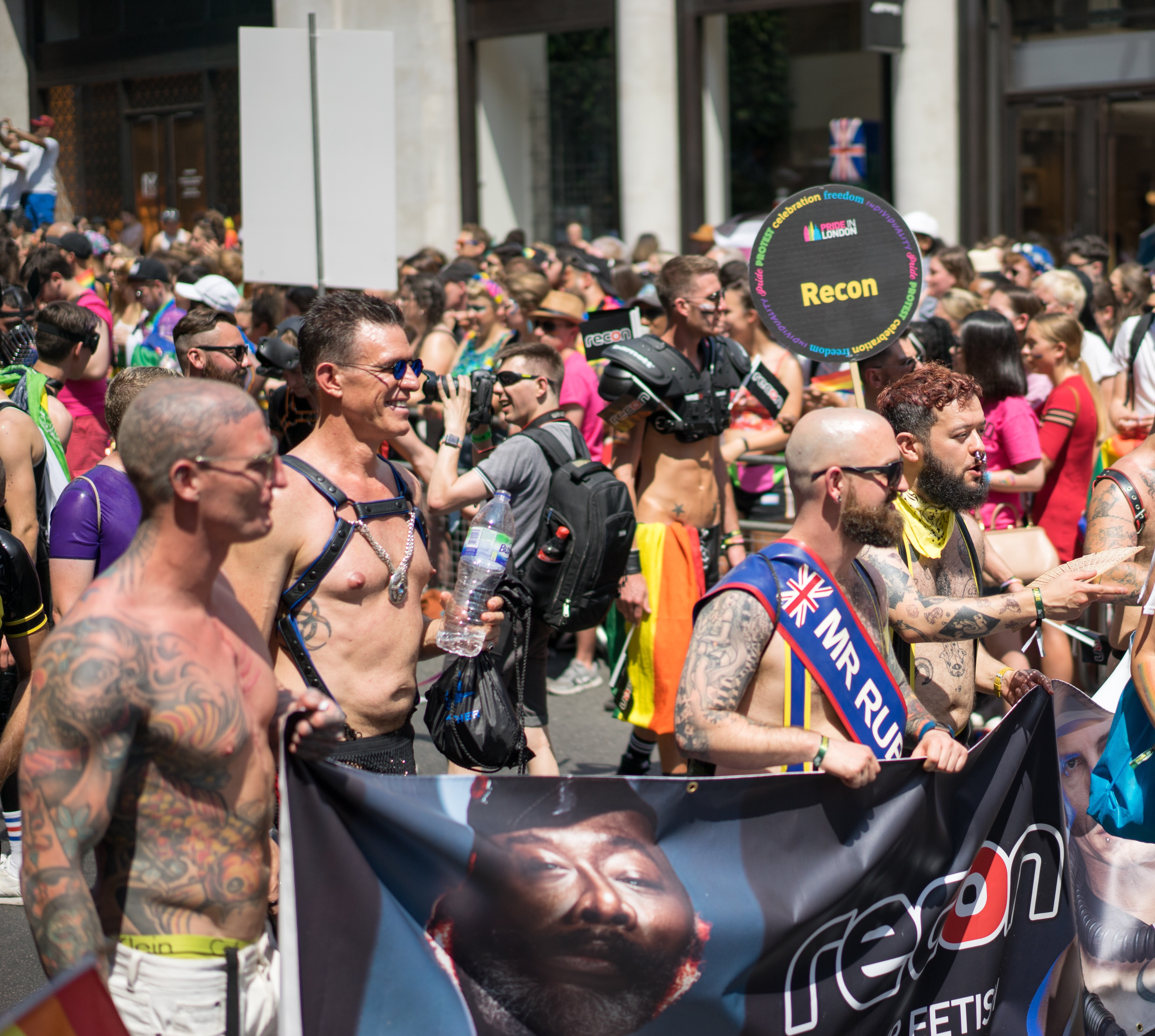
Recon at Pride in London 2018

Recon produces a number of fetish events for members and non-members, in cities including London and Paris.

Recon has produced two issues of a magazine, with high-quality photography and articles from the fetish community, which is distributed for free at gay venues.

== Controversies ==
=== Effect on leather bars, sex clubs and saunas ===
Some have claimed that gay dating apps have a negative impact on local businesses such as gay bars, and that Recon's widespread usage by fetishmen has reduced business in leather bars, sex clubs and saunas. However, many businesses actively promote their businesses on Recon to appeal to local customers.

=== Location data leaks ===
In 2019, researchers at Pen Test Partners demonstrated to BBC News how it was possible to locate the exact location of a Recon user without their consent, along with users of other apps, through a process of trilateration. However, Recon was praised for taking immediate steps to rectify the fault much faster than some other apps.
