= International Ms. Leather =

International leather subculture event

- IMsLBB logo (2024)
- Nickname: IMsL
- Status: Active
- Genre: leather; kink; fetish; BDSM
- Inaugurated: 1987
- Organiser: IMsLBB LLC
- Website: www.imslbb.com

International Ms. Leather (IMsL) is an annual leather subculture fetish convention and competition, originally focused on women but now inclusive of all genders. Since 1999, the convention has also included a Ms. Bootblack (IMsBB) contest.

After Ms. Leather events had been held in San Francisco since 1981, the first formal International Ms. Leather convention took place in 1987. The first International Ms. Leather was Judy Tallwing McCarthey.

In 1988, International Ms. Leather received the Large Club of the Year award as part of the Pantheon of Leather Awards. In 2009, International Ms. Leather received the Chuck Renslow President's Award from the Leather Archives & Museum. In 2009, 2013, and 2017, International Ms. Leather received the Large Event of the Year award as part of the Pantheon of Leather Awards, and in 2018 International Ms Leather Bootblack received that award.

International Ms. Leather moved in 2014 from the SOMA neighborhood of San Francisco to San Jose.

The Leather Archives & Museum’s photos, videos, and oral histories chronicling International Ms. Leather (and International Mr. Leather) were featured in a 2015 documentary by Christina Court, titled High Shine: 15 Years of International Ms Bootblack.

The International Ms Leather (IMsL) Foundation began its work in 2015. The foundation’s website states, “We are committed to fostering healthy environments for Women to succeed in Leather and Kink spaces by providing education, programming, and financial support.” In 2016 that foundation received the Nonprofit Organization of the Year award as part of the Pantheon of Leather Awards.

International Ms. Leather has had a focus on community leadership from the start. The contestants must meet objectives and deadlines set before the convention, and at the event are judged on costuming, speech, a fantasy performance, knowledge of the leather scene as demonstrated in a quiz and an interview, and also organizing skills as demonstrated in having two others set up an auction table for them at the convention.

Producers of the event have included Audrey Joseph and 1993's International Ms. Leather winner Amy Marie Meek (later Amy Meek-DeJarlais). "Amy Marie Meek – International Ms. Leather" received the International Deaf Leather Recognition Award in 2001.

Judges have included Kitty Tsui.

== International Ms. Leather Winners ==
As of 2026, 38 contestants representing three countries have won IMsL: the United States (35), Canada (2), and Australia (1).

Year and contest location	IMsL winner	Winner's preliminary title or sponsor	Winner's city	Field of contestants
1987 - San Francisco, CA	Judy Tallwing McCarthey		Portland, Oregon	15 contestants
1988 - San Francisco, CA	Shann Carr	Sponsored by Portland Power and Trust	Portland, Oregon	10 contestants, from the U.S. and Canada
1989 - San Francisco, CA	Susie Shepherd	Ms. Portland Leatherwoman 1989	Portland, Oregon	11 contestants, from the U.S. and Canada
1990 - San Francisco, CA	Gabrielle Antolovich	Ms. Southern California Leatherwoman 1989	Los Angeles, California	12 contestants, from the U.S. and Canada
1991 - San Francisco, CA	Kay Hallinger	North Halsted Ms. Leather 1991	Bloomington, Indiana	12 contestants
1992 - San Francisco, CA	Blair Kituhwa	Ms. San Francisco Leather 1992	San Francisco, California	10 contestants, from the U.S. and Canada
1993 - San Francisco, CA	Amy Marie Meek	Ms. Leather Nebraska 1992	Omaha, Nebraska	9 contestants
1994 - San Francisco, CA	Anne C.S. Bergstedt (later known as Spencer Bergstedt) (Note: Bergstedt stepped down as IMsL on September 13, 1994, giving the title to the year's runner-up.)	Washington State Ms. Leather 1993	Seattle, Washington	11 contestants, from the U.S. and Canada
1994 - San Francisco, CA	Cindy Bookout	Ms. Oklahoma Leather 1993	Oklahoma City, Oklahoma	11 contestants, from the U.S. and Canada
1995 - Chicago, IL	Pat Baillie	Ms. LeatherMaster 1995	Phoenix, Arizona	19 contestants
1996 - Philadelphia, PA	Jill Carter (first black winner)	TULSA (Tulsa Uniform Leather Seekers Assoc.)	Willow Grove, Pennsylvania	20 contestants
1997 - San Diego, CA	Genelle Moore (Note: Moore's brother Ron won International Mr. Leather in 1984, making them the first opposite-gender sibling pair to both win leather titles.)	Sponsored by the Female Leather Exchange (FLEX)	Lincoln, Nebraska	11 contestants
1998 - Atlanta, GA	Megan (DeJarlais) Martin	Ms. Baltimore Eagle 1993	Baltimore, Maryland	18 contestants
1999 - Las Vegas, NV	Pam Meyer	Ms. San Francisco Leather 1999	San Francisco, California	14 contestants
2000 - Toronto, Canada	Jo Blas	Sponsored by Kim Wolf of Leatherwoman Productions	San Diego, California	10 contestants, from the U.S. and Canada
2001 - Dallas, TX	Joni Perry	Ms. International Olympus Leather 2000	Springfield, Virginia	9 contestants, from the U.S. and Canada
2002 - Omaha, NE	Russ Cosgrove	Sponsored by 3SM	Calgary, Alberta, Canada	6 contestants, from the U.S. and Canada
2003 - Omaha, NE	Tammie Nelson	Sponsored by Kendra McClain & the Great Lakes Leather Alliance	Greenwood, Indiana	5 contestants, from the U.S. and Canada
2004 - Omaha, NE	Lori Ellison	Sponsored by HPL Productions of Colorado	Rio Rancho, New Mexico	5 contestants
2005 - Omaha, NE	Jessi Holman Ahart	Ms. Baltimore Eagle 2005	Baltimore, Maryland	4 contestants
2006 - Omaha, NE	Lady Faye Falconeer	Sponsored by Flesh and Fantasy & the Dallas Eagle	Dallas, Texas	2 contestants
2007 - San Francisco, CA	Lauren Ide	Southwest Ms. Leather 2006	Phoenix, Arizona	6 contestants
2008 - San Francisco, CA	Hobbit	Washington State Ms. Leather 1996	Seattle, Washington	4 contestants
2009 - San Francisco, CA	Lamalani Siverts	Washington State Ms. Leather 2008	Seattle, Washington	3 contestants
2010 - San Francisco, CA	Mollena Williams	Ms. San Francisco Leather 2009	San Francisco, California	8 contestants
2011 - San Francisco, CA	Sara Vibes		New York, New York	4 contestants
2012 - San Francisco, CA	Synn	Ms. Texas Leather 2012	Dallas, Texas	?
2013 - San Francisco, CA	Sarha Shaubach	Ms. Alaska Leather 2011/2012	Meadow Lakes, Alaska	?
2014 - San Jose, CA	Patty	Ms. Leather Toronto 2014	Toronto, Ontario, Canada	?
2015 - San Jose, CA	Sarge	Ms. San Diego Leather 2015	San Diego, California	9 contestants
2016 - San Jose, CA	Lascivious Jane	Ms. Philadelphia Leather 2015	Philadelphia, Pennsylvania	4 contestants
2017 - San Jose, CA	Girl Complex	Ms. Alameda County Leather 2016	Oakland, California	7 contestants
2018 - San Jose, CA	girl ang	Sponsored by Lucrezia and De Sade	Melbourne, Victoria, Australia	6 contestants
2019 - San Jose, CA	Haley Alice	Ms. San Francisco Leather 2018	San Francisco, California	2 contestants
~~2020~~	Contest cancelled due to COVID-19 pandemic			
2021	Virtual event held with no contest			
2022	Virtual event held with no contest			
2023 - Piscataway, NJ	Liquid	Northeast Leatherperson 2020/2021	New York, New York	4 contestants
2024 - Piscataway, NJ	Goddess Indigo	Ms. Texas Leather 2023	Austin, Texas	2 contestants
2025 - Piscataway, NJ	Velvet-Storm	Ms. New Jersey Leather 2017, Leatherwoman of Color 2019	Camden, New Jersey	4 contestants
2026 - Piscataway, NJ	Akasha Eden	Northeast slave 2024	New York, New York	2 contestants

== International Ms. Bootblack Winners ==
As of 2026, 23 contestants representing the United States (21), Canada (1), and the United Kingdom (1) have won IMsBB.

Year	IMsBB winner	Winner's preliminary title or sponsor	Winner's city	Field of contestants
1999	Leslie Anderson	American Leatherwoman 1997	Bosque Farms, New Mexico	4 contestants
2000	michael ann	Sponsored by High Plains Leather	Colorado Springs, Colorado	2 contestants
2001	Charlie Flake	Sponsored by The Denver Triangle	Denver, Colorado	2 contestants
2002	Kari	Sponsored by Centaur Motorcycle Club	Washington, D.C.	2 contestants
2003	Slaveboi Eddie (Donna Moran)	Sponsored by the Los Angeles boys of Leather & Bill Mitchell, American Leatherman 2003	Los Angeles, California	4 contestants
2004	izzy	Sponsored by the Great Lakes Leather Association	Milwaukee, Wisconsin	3 contestants
2005	Suka	Sponsored by Cellblock Chicago & the Lesbian Community Cancer Project	Chicago, Illinois	1 contestant
2006	Alex	Sponsored by the Great Lakes Leather Alliance & Ramrod	Medford, Massachusetts	2 contestants
2007	Miss V	Sponsored by the San Francisco Boot Black Studio	Alameda, California	4 contestants
2008	Q	SouthEast LeatherFest Bootblack 2007	Atlanta, Georgia	2 contestants
2009	Pony	Leather Rose's House Bootblack	Chicago, Illinois	3 contestants
2010	Jayson DaBoi	Ms. Rio Grande Leather 2010	Albuquerque, New Mexico	2 contestants
2011	kd	?	Portland, Maine	4 contestants
2012	Tarna	Bootblack Toronto 2012	Toronto, Ontario, Canada	2 contestants
2013	bella	Great Lakes Bootblack 2012	Louisville, Kentucky	?
2014	Dara	Oregon State Bootblack 2013	Portland, Oregon	?
2015	slave tabitha	Southwest Bootblack 2009	Phoenix, Arizona	5 contestants
2016	Meghan	Great Lakes Bootblack 2015	Louisville, Kentucky	3 contestants
2017	Elisa	Great Lakes Bootblack 2016	Detroit, Michigan	6 contestants
2018	Teagan Ross	Southwest Bootblack 2017	Oakland, California	5 contestants
2019	Gretchen Wellman	Alaska State Bootblack 2018	Anchorage, Alaska	3 contestants
~~2020~~	Contest cancelled due to COVID-19 pandemic			
2021	Virtual event held with no contest			
2022	Virtual event held with no contest			
2023	[vacant] (Note: In the event of a contest only having one contestant who does not earn the minimum number of points required to qualify for the title, no winner is announced for that year.)	N/A	N/A	1 contestant
2024	SpankCake	Sponsored by S.A.K.E. (SoCal Asian Kink Events)	Los Angeles, California	4 contestants
2025	[vacant]	N/A	N/A	1 contestant
2026	Astrid	Bootblack Europe 2026	London, England, United Kingdom	2 contestants

== See also ==
- Leather competitions
- International Mr. Leather
