= Back 2 Earth =

Defunct LGBTQ drinking establishment in Portland, Oregon, U.S.

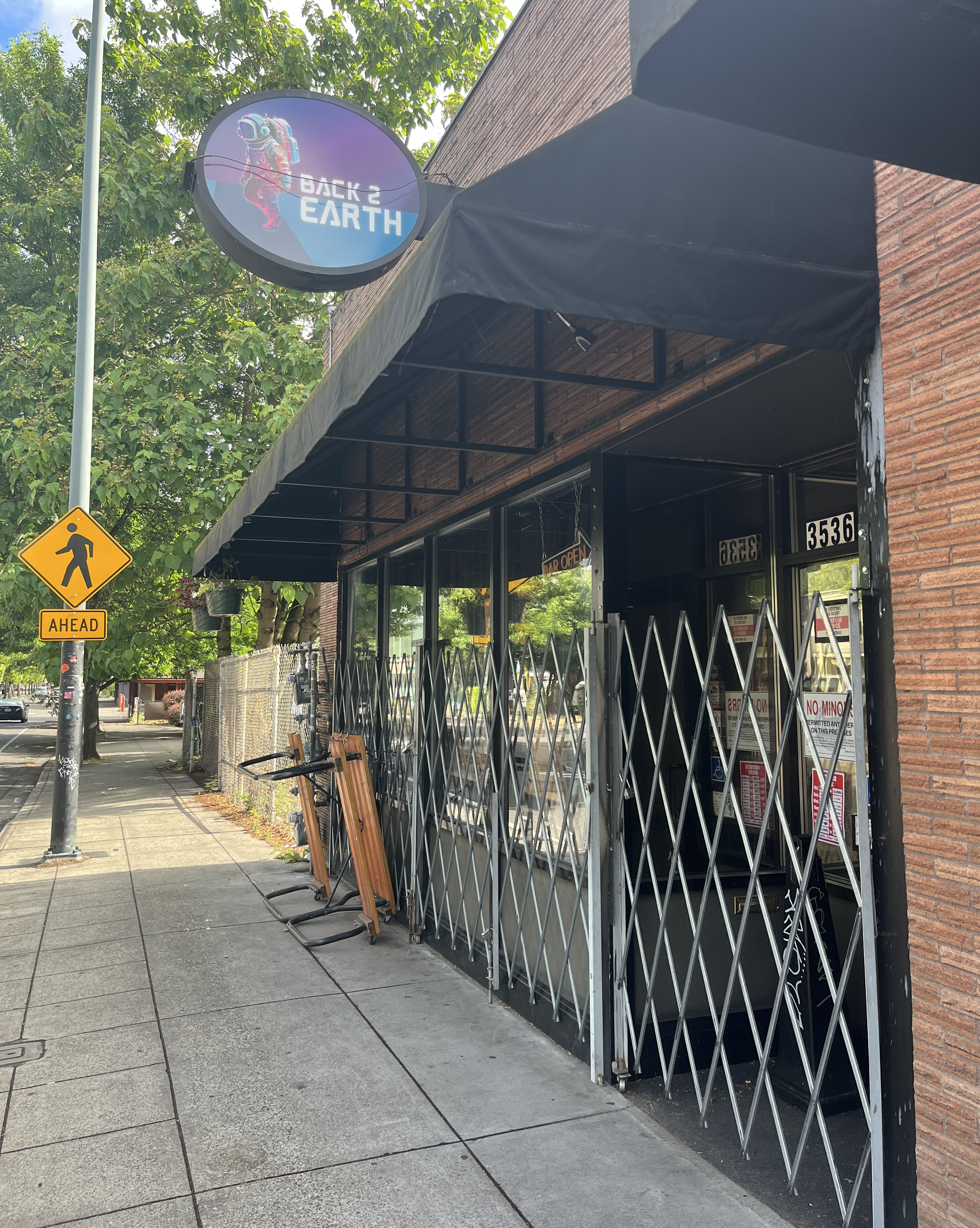
- The bar's exterior, 2026
- Interactive map of Back 2 Earth

Restaurant information
- Established: June 30, 2023
- Owner: Dan Henderson
- Location: 3536 Northeast Martin Luther King Jr Boulevard, Portland, Multnomah, Oregon, 97212, United States
- Coordinates: 45.5488°N 122.6614°W
- Website: back2earthpdx.com

Back 2 Earth was an LGBTQ-friendly bar in Portland, Oregon, in the United States. Owner Dan Henderson opened the bar in northeast Portland's King neighborhood in June 2023, in the space that previously housed Local Lounge. Back 2 Earth hosted a variety of activities and events such as dance parties, drag shows, karaoke, and open mics, and had a collection of board games and tabletop role-playing games.

== Description ==
Back 2 Earth was described as an LGBTQ+ and queer bar near the intersection of Martin Luther King Jr. Boulevard and Fremont Street in northeast Portland's King neighborhood. The space-themed bar's logo and signage depicted a rainbow-hued astronaut. Andrew Jankowski of Eater Portland called Back 2 Earth a "cosmic, casual queer bar" with disc jockeys (DJs) with activities and events such as dance parties, drag shows, game nights, karaoke, and open mics. The LGBTQ-owned bar had a collection of board games and tabletop role-playing games. Jankowski also said the interior had "an eclectic mix of naturalism and sci-fi opulence".

The bar had carpet from the Portland International Airport, wood shelves with backlighting, queer paintings and tchotchkes such as a cherry-shaped disco ball, light-emitting diode (LED) planetary globes, as well as a projector playing videos of cephalopods, Oregon landscapes, and space. A hanging wall garden with approximately 200 plants had custom lights, irrigation, and a drainage system. An Earring Magic Ken doll was by the register, and there were two antique lamps hanging from the ceiling. Back 2 Earth had a video game arcade machine and a couch in a nook.

=== Menu ===
The food menu included burgers and sandwiches, a Sukiyaki Steak Plate with rice and vegetables, and a cheese dip with za'atar ricotta and feta served with ciabatta drizzled with butter and honey, fried gyoza, chicken fingers, and tater tots with ranch dressing. Sandwich ingredients included spicy chicken, pulled pork, portobello mushrooms, and garlic aioli. The brunch menu included corn flake-crusted chicken and waffles as well as fruit. Back 2 Earth also offered grilled cheese and tomato soup with garlic confit.

Drinks included: an espresso martini called the Meteorite with cold brew coffee, vanilla-flavored Absolut Vodka, and simple syrup; a habanero-infused margarita with slices of jalapeño; a watermelon mojito; a version of a paper plane called the Space Trip; and a variation on a Tom Collins with Drambuie. The bar's namesake drink had chamoy vodka and watermelon liquor with a rim of Tajín seasoning. Boneyard, Ecliptic, Gigantic, and PFriem were among beer options.

== History ==
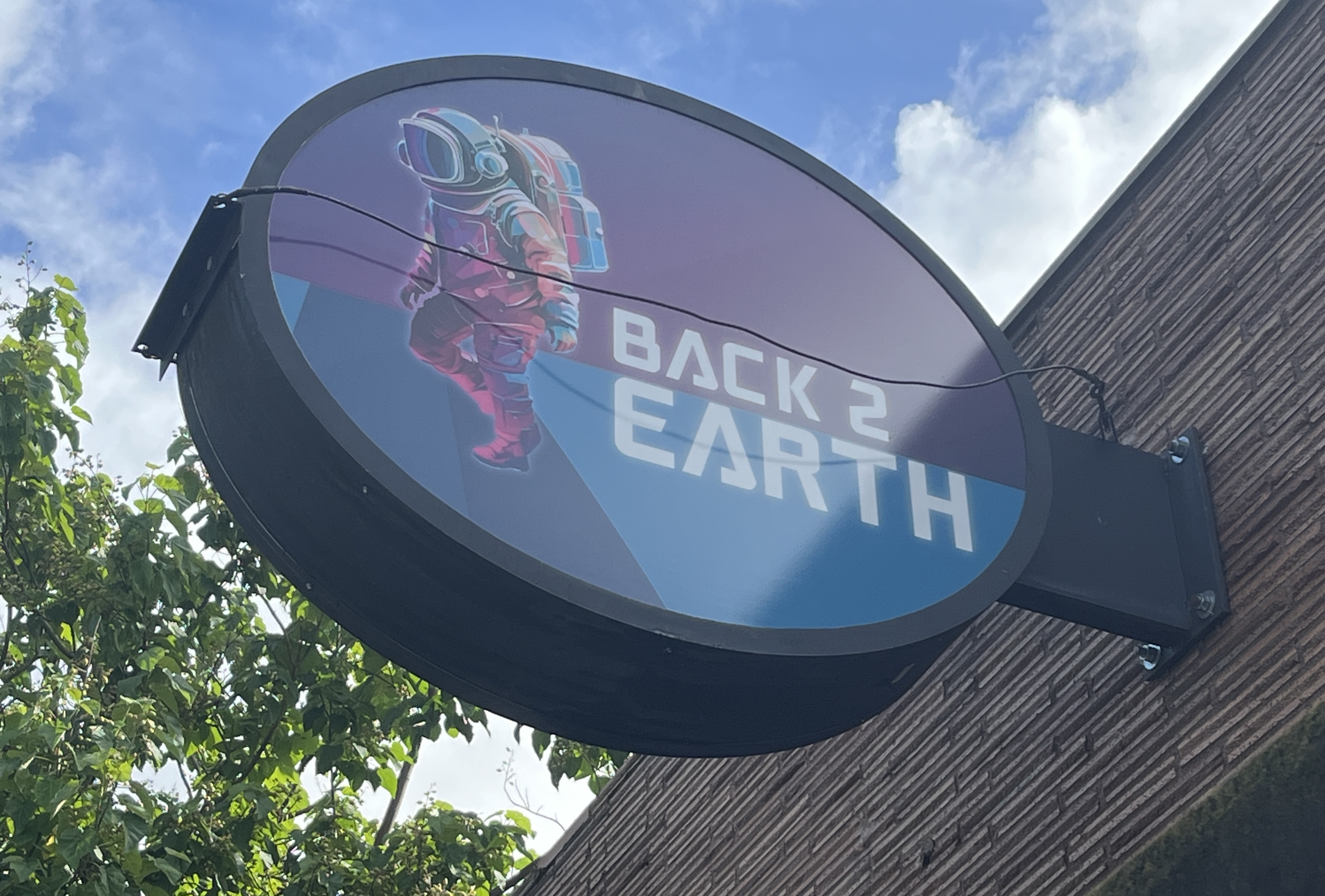
Exterior sign in 2026

Owner Dan Henderson—who also owns Eagle Portland—opened Back 2 Earth on June 30, 2023, in the space that housed a gay bar called Local Lounge until 2021. Henderson was interested in purchasing the Local Lounge prior to its closure, but he was unable to find enough financial backing to save the business.

The two antique lamps were donated by Thomas Lauderdale of Pink Martini and rewired, painted, and gilded by Henderson over six months. Prior to the bar's opening, Back 2 Earth was "sanctified" (or blessed) by the Sisters of Perpetual Indulgence's Portland house, called the Order of Benevolent Bliss, on June 28. According to Jankowski, Henderson hoped for Back 2 Earth to "settle as common ground for the entire LGBTQ community, based around his biggest interests: science, music, art, and culture". Jay Maas became the kitchen manager in February 2024; they planned to launch an "American comfort"-focused food menu with an arugula and fennel salad with gluten-free croutons, as well as potato chips and caramelized French onion dip, poutine, and vegan corn dogs.

According to Portland Monthly, Back 2 Earth hosted the long-running dance party called Dyke Nite, organized by bartender and event producer Ann Pyne, as well as DJs from the "avant-garde trans and nonbinary" group of artists known as the Uwu Collective. A 420-related event in 2024, called UwUtopia, was "about exploring what queer joy, and queer utopia might feel like through sounds, dancing, and friendships".

== Reception ==
In Eater Portland's 2022 overview of contributors' favorite new establishments, Andrew Jankowski wrote, "I've ... really enjoyed Back 2 Earth's impact on the LGBTQ+ bar scene, reactivating the old Local Lounge space. They're great for after-office happy hour or a late night party." Writing for Portland Monthly in 2023, he said the bar was "quickly becoming a favorite" and the interior "make[s] you feel like you're in an alien jungle".

== See also ==
- List of defunct restaurants of the United States
