= Local Lounge =

Defunct gay bar in Portland, Oregon, U.S.

- Logo

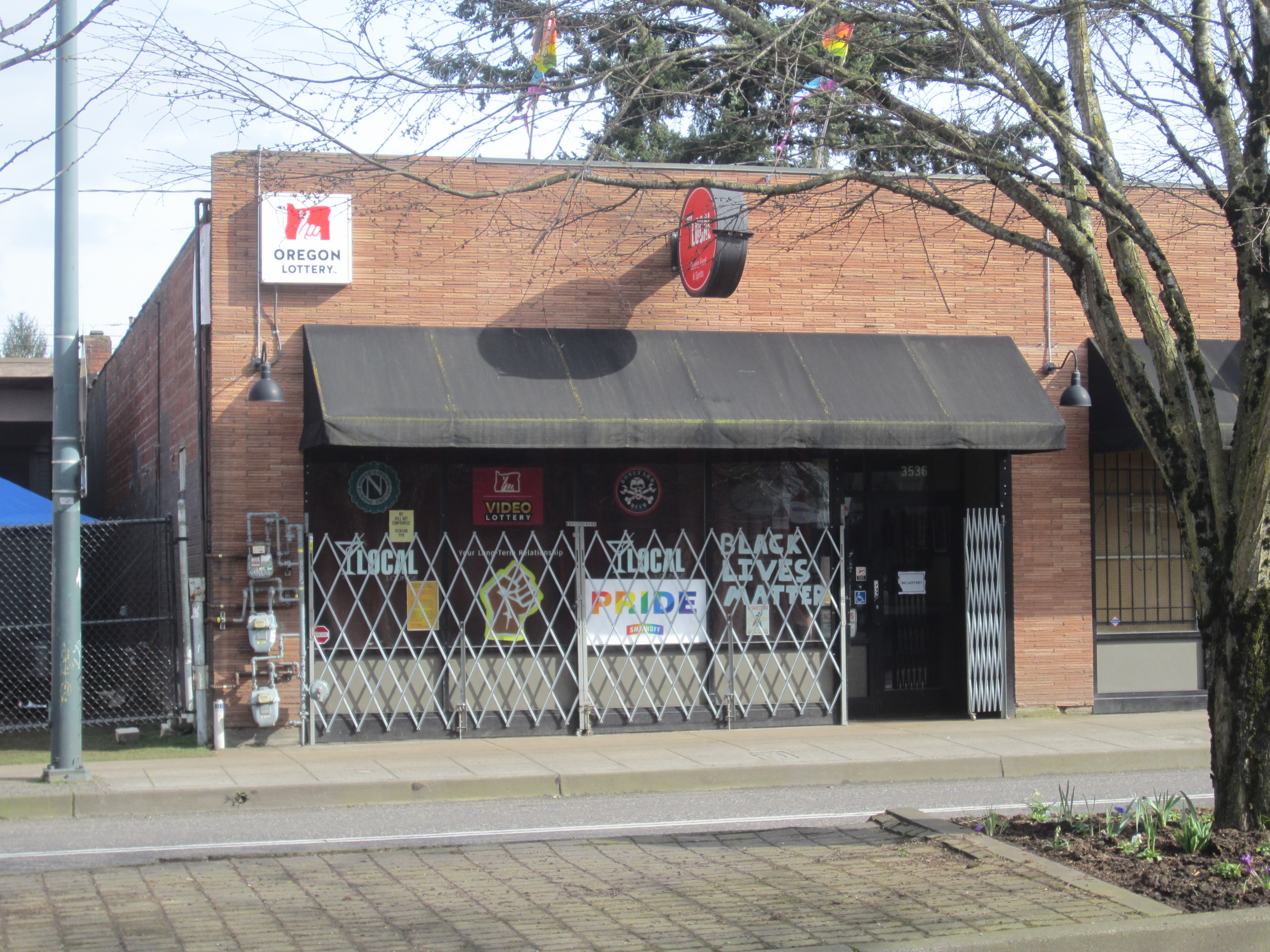
- The bar's front exterior in 2021
- Interactive map of Local Lounge
- Address: 3536 NE Martin Luther King Jr. Boulevard; Portland, Oregon; United States
- Coordinates: 45.5488°N 122.6613°W
- Type: Gay bar

Construction
- Opened: 2010
- Closed: 2021

Website
- localloungeofficial.com

Local Lounge was a gay bar in Portland, Oregon, operating from 2010 to 2021.

== Description ==
Local Lounge was a bar on Martin Luther King Jr. Boulevard in northeast Portland's King neighborhood. The Portland Mercury described the space as a "neighborhood bar with a calendar full of drag revues, variety shows, karaoke nights, and dance parties" and an "unpretentious atmosphere". The venue showcased LGBT artwork and hosted brunch, as well as pop-up restaurants.

In 2016, Willamette Week's AP Kryza wrote, "Were it not for the rainbow flag on the exterior, there would be no way of knowing the awesome that lurks inside Local Lounge. Hell, there's little to distinguish it from the liquor store and the Subway with which it shares a building directly across from Purringtons Cat Lounge. But inside, well, there's no mistaking that you're in a bar that veers less toward 'gay friendly' and more toward 'straight-friendly gay bar.'" Kryza also said, "... on less raucous days, Local Lounge lives up to its name. It's a surprisingly unassuming hang, a wood-laden den that could easily double as a suburban coffee shop or wine bar. It's a North Carolinian legislator's nightmare…a place that's so friendly and laid back that even the nongender-assigned bathrooms are inviting." In 2019, Byron Beck and Conner Reed of Eater Portland said the bar "prides itself on its all-inclusive atmosphere and offers live music, art shows, a tiny outdoor seating area, [and] drag performances".

Local Lounge had pool, televisions, and video poker. Some drinks on the menu were named after celebrities; the Neil Patrick Harris had cucumber vodka, lime, soda, and Chambord, and the Manhattan was named after Rachel Maddow. Food options included chicken flautas and mozzarella sticks as appetizers, as well as macaroni and cheese. 'The LGBT' is a BLT with guacamole.

== History ==
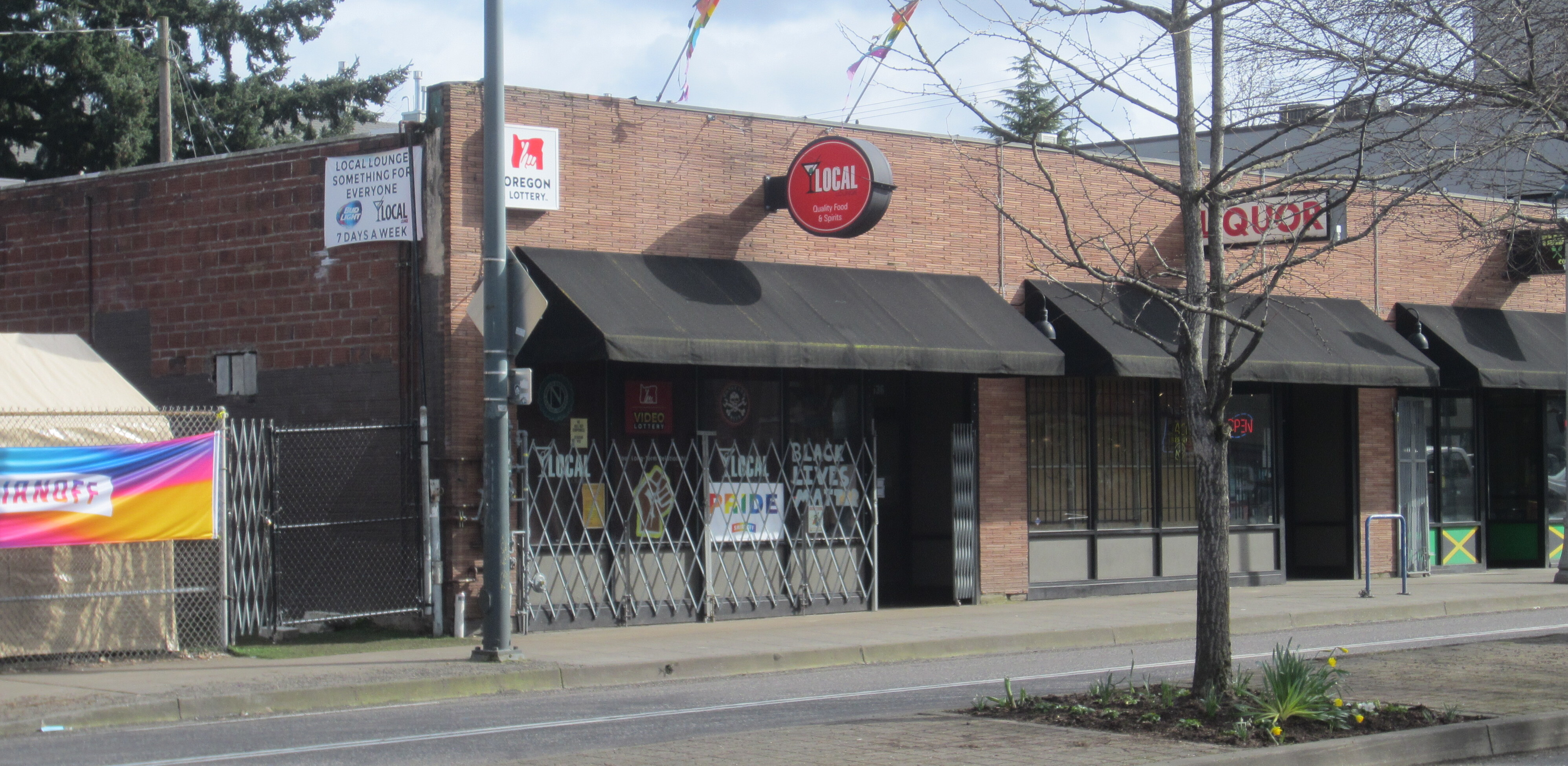
The bar's exterior, 2022

Randy Faber owned the bar, which was established in 2010.

Local Lounge hosted dance parties and karaoke regularly. Weekly events included karaoke on Fridays and "goth dance nights" on Mondays, as of 2016. Willamette Week described the biweekly event Femmes as a "music history lesson-meets-drag show dedicated to trailblazing femme musicians". Monthly events included Oregon Bears meetings (called Bear Paw Bust) every third Saturday and Tea Dances every first Sunday. In 2018, Local Lounge hosted 'Zaddy: A Genderfluid Pride Day Party', catering to genderfluid and queer people, especially those of color, as well as an election watch party with performances called 'Shitshow!'. In 2019, the bar hosted 'Queer Syllabus: A Celebration with Foglifter and The Rumpus' with Melissa Febos and T Kira Madden as part of the Association of Writers & Writing Programs' annual conference.

The bar closed in November 2021. Brooke Jackson-Glidden of Eater Portland wrote, "It appears that the COVID-19 pandemic and mounting conflicts between the owner of the bar and its staff are the impetus for the bar's shuttering." The gay bar Back 2 Earth opened in the space in 2023.

== Reception ==
Willamette Week's 2019 list of the "Top Five Places to Drink in Portland During Pride Week" said, "Local Lounge might be Portland's most unassuming gay bar, with only a rainbow flag to distinguish it from the liquor store and Jamaican restaurant with which it shares a building, but it's also home to some of the more unique LGBTQ entertainment in town." In their overview of the city's "wildest gay bars and hangouts", Beck and Reed described the macaroni and cheese as "to die for".

== See also ==
- COVID-19 pandemic in Portland, Oregon
- Impact of the COVID-19 pandemic on the LGBT community
