= The Detroit Eagle =

LGBTQ+ entertainment complex in Detroit

Detroit Eagle / The Eagle of Detroit
- Address: 928 W McNichols Rd, Detroit, MI 48203
- Location: Detroit, Michigan, United States
- Type: Nightclub and entertainment complex

Construction
- Opened: (Original Menjos) 1970s

Detroit Eagle is a nightclub and entertainment complex in Detroit, Michigan. It has adopted an attribution to a larger network of gay bars which have a common theme and cater primarily to the LGBTQ+ community, particularly the leather subculture and BDSM subculture.

== History ==
After World War II, downtown Detroit became a hub for gay bars. Starting in the 1950s, the gay population began following the migration pattern of many Metro Detroiters, heading northward. By the 1970s, there was a community in the Palmer Park that thrived until the late 1980s.

Specific details on the bar origins are unclear. The Detroit Eagle is located at the Menjos Complex, where Menjos, the original bar, was established in the 1970s, and became a popular gathering spot for the LGBTQ+ community.

The original location was at 1501 Holden St Detroit, Michigan, now known as the Marble Bar, a live music venue bar that opened in the Fall of 2015 in the space formerly occupied by the Detroit Eagle, which moved in 2010. The Detroit Eagle became a part of this larger Menjos Complex in 2010. Over the years, the venue expanded and evolved, eventually becoming the Menjos Complex, which includes multiple bars, a dance club, and various entertainment spaces.

=== Connection to Madonna ===
In the 1970s, Madonna made youthful forays into Menjo's in the Palmer Park area. Her presence at this historic establishment was an important chapter in her early life, and this was likely the first gay bar she ever visited. According to local legend, Madonna's patronage of the bar took place during the mid- to late 1970s. However, her visits were not without controversy, as she was eventually barred from the establishment. Tim McKee-Zazo, Menjo’s general manager said “Before she went to New York and got famous, this was her hangout. Her period of coming here was the mid- to late ’70s, but then she was barred from coming,” he said, sharing a local legend. “She got kicked out of here for pulling her vagina out. She was a rowdy teenager at the time.” The original disco ball Madonna danced under is still in the possession of Menjo's; "That's the original 1976 disco ball that Madonna used to dance under here at Menjo's. She was 16 years old."

== See also ==
- Bear (gay culture)
- The Eagle (gay bars)
- LGBTQ culture
- LGBT culture in Detroit
