= Eagle NYC =

Gay bar in Manhattan, New York

- Logo
- Interactive map of Eagle NYC
- Address: 554 West 28th Street; New York, NY 10001; United States
- Location: Manhattan
- Coordinates: 40°45′06.1″N 74°00′15.5″W
- Type: Gay bar

Website
- eagle-ny.com

Eagle NYC, also called The Eagle, is a gay bar and a leather bar in Manhattan, New York. It famously inspired a informal, global network of gay bars sharing the "Eagle" name.

== Description and history ==
The bar became a popular spot for gay men in New York from 1970 onwards, with a change of ownership and rebranding of the bar following the 1969 Stonewall riots.

New York magazine described Eagle NYC as "a palatial two-story leather bar located near the West Side Highway" and rated the bar 79 out of 100. The bar hosts an annual Mr. Eagle leather contest. The venue has been located at West 28th Street and 11th Avenue since 2001.

Mike Miksche at Daily Xtra said the bar is "dependable on weekends and maintains the classic leather bar vibe".

In 2010, Frank Olson and Don Morrison, who made the bar a gay leather bar in 1970, were inducted into the Leather Hall of Fame.

== See also ==
- Bear (gay culture)
- The Eagle (gay bars)
- LGBTQ culture in New York City
- List of LGBTQ bars
