= Eagle Houston =

Former gay bar in Houston, Texas

- The Eagle
- Logo

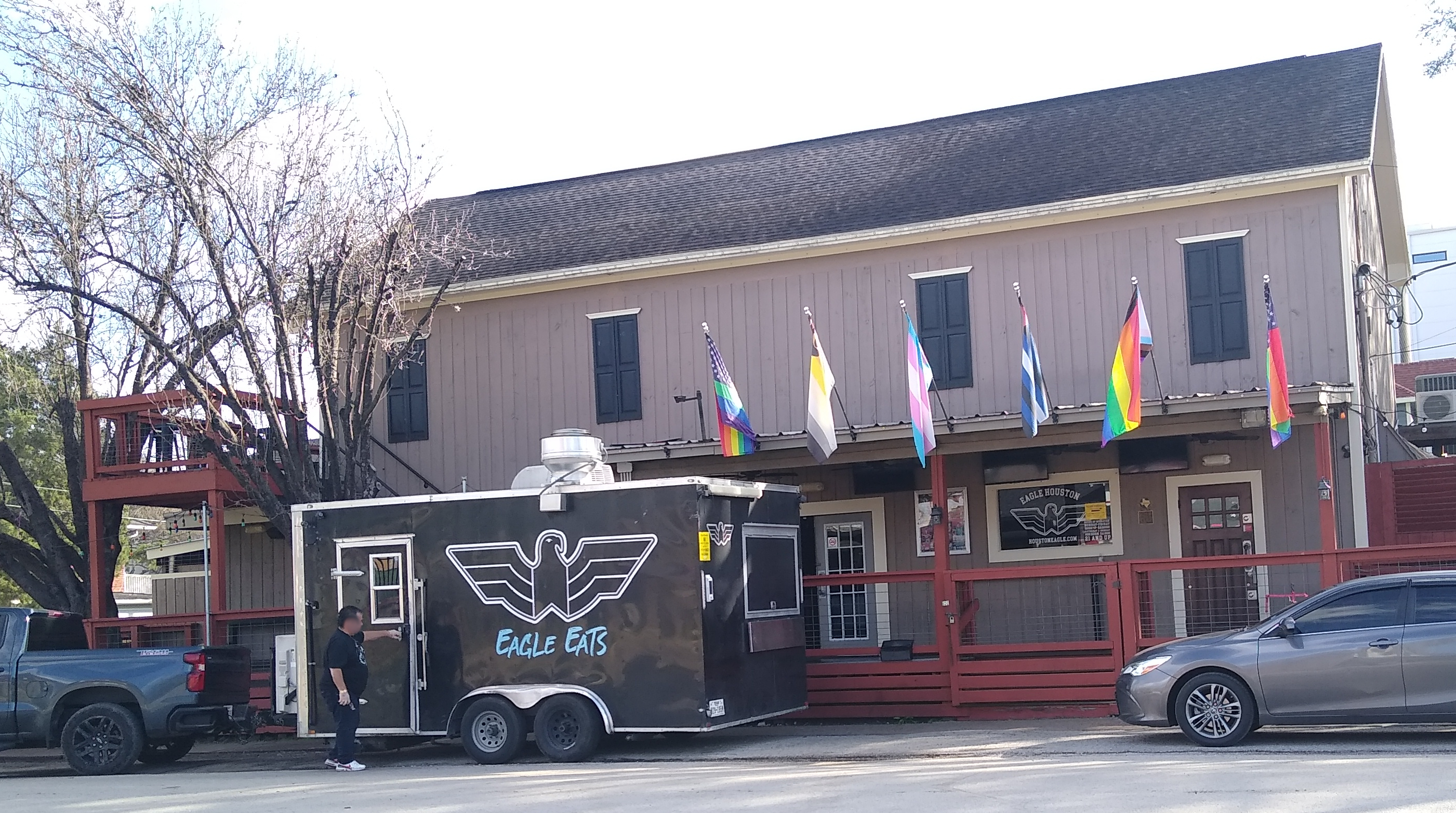
- The bar's exterior in 2023
- Interactive map of Eagle Houston
- Address: 611 Hyde Park Blvd, Houston, TX 77006
- Location: Houston, Texas, United States
- Coordinates: 29.74723°N 95.38872°W
- Type: Gay bar, nightclub

Construction
- Expanded: 2014
- Closed: 2025

Website
- houstoneagle.com

Eagle Houston, also known as The Eagle, was a gay bar in Montrose, Houston, Texas. It was part of the informal, global network of "Eagle" bars and catered to the leather and bear subcultures. It sponsored the Mr. Texas Eagle leather competition.

== History ==
The bar was forced to temporarily close in January 2016 due to a fire.

In 2016, a mural associated with Mary's was digitized and recreated at the Eagle.

The gay bar was the ninth most popular in the United States in 2018, according to Logo TV's NewNowNext.

On July 11, 2025, the bar abruptly closed down due to disagreements with its landlord.

== Reception ==
The bar was named "Favorite Community Bar", "Favorite Men's Bar", "Favorite Place to Show Off Your Leather", and "Club or Restaurant with Best Happy Hour" by OutSmart's "Gayest and Greatest" list in 2018. The Eagle was also a finalist in the "Favorite Place to Watch Male Dancers", "Favorite Bar to Shoot Pool", and "Club or Restaurant with Best Margarita" categories.

== See also ==
- The Eagle (gay bars)
- LGBTQ culture
