= Denver Eagle =

Gay bar in Denver, Colorado

The Denver Eagle
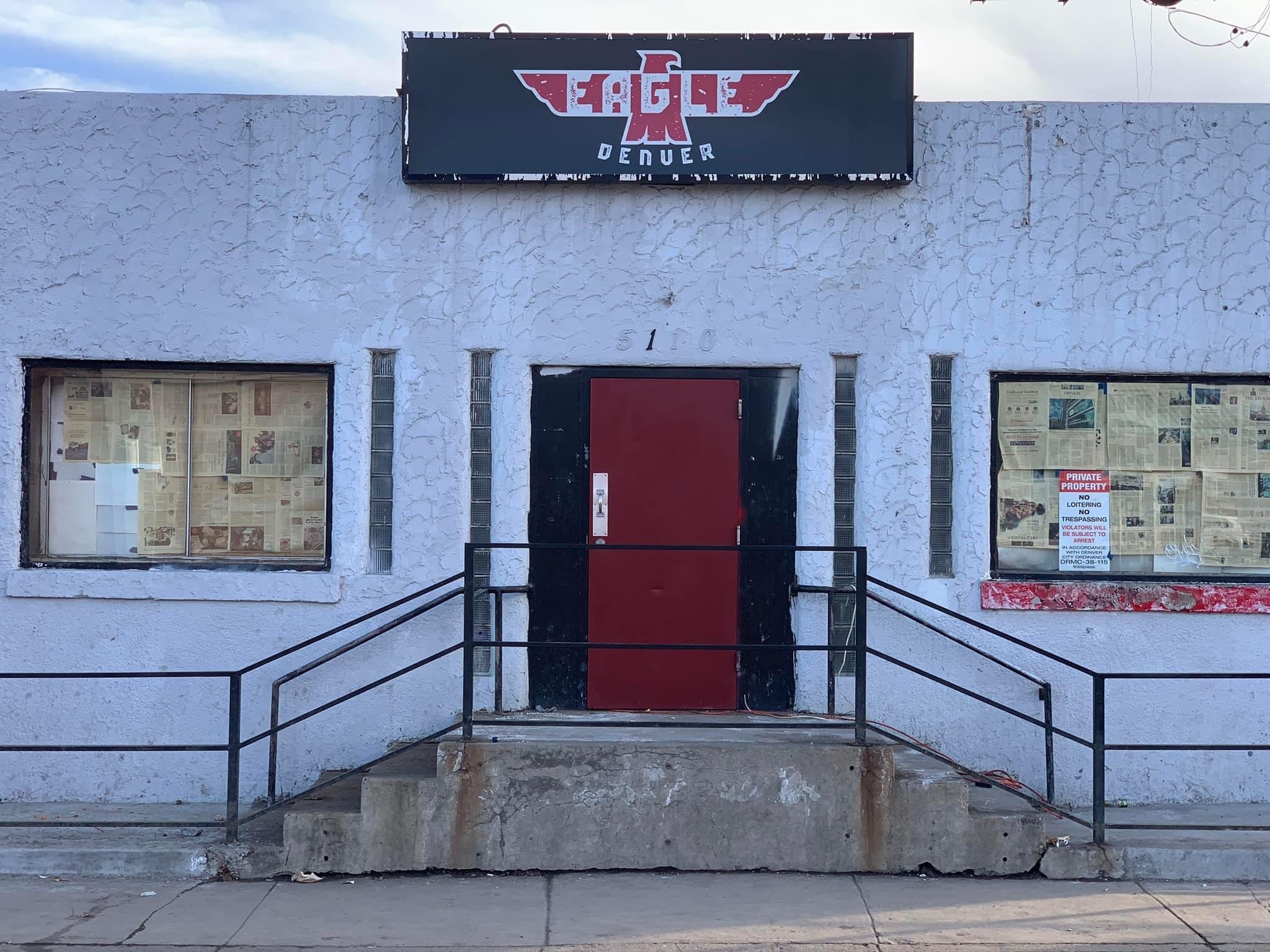
- Street view of front of Denver Eagle
- Interactive map of The Denver Eagle
- Former names: The Den (previous tenant)
- Address: 5110 W Colfax Ave; Denver, Colorado; United States
- Coordinates: 39°44′25″N 105°03′09″W
- Type: Gay bar, leather bar
- Current use: Nightclub and community hub

Construction
- Opened: March 19, 2022

Website
- denver-eagle.com

The Denver Eagle is a gay bar in Denver, Colorado, United States. It is part of the informal, global network of "Eagle" bars that cater to leather and kink communities. It also caters to the bear subculture.

== History ==
The original Denver Eagle was located at 1475 36th St. in the RiNo Arts district of Denver. It was known for its large gold penis shaped door handles. In April 2016 The Denver Eagle closed due to the property being bought by a developer and The Eagle losing their lease.

In March 2018, a new location opened at 1246 E. 31st Ave. It closed a few months later.

In 2022, new owners purchased a building at 5110 W Colfax Ave. The building was home to "The Den" a now defunct gay bar. The grand opening was held March 19-22 with the theme "The Eagle Has Landed." The Denver Eagle is one of a few black-owned gay bars in the United States.

== Events ==
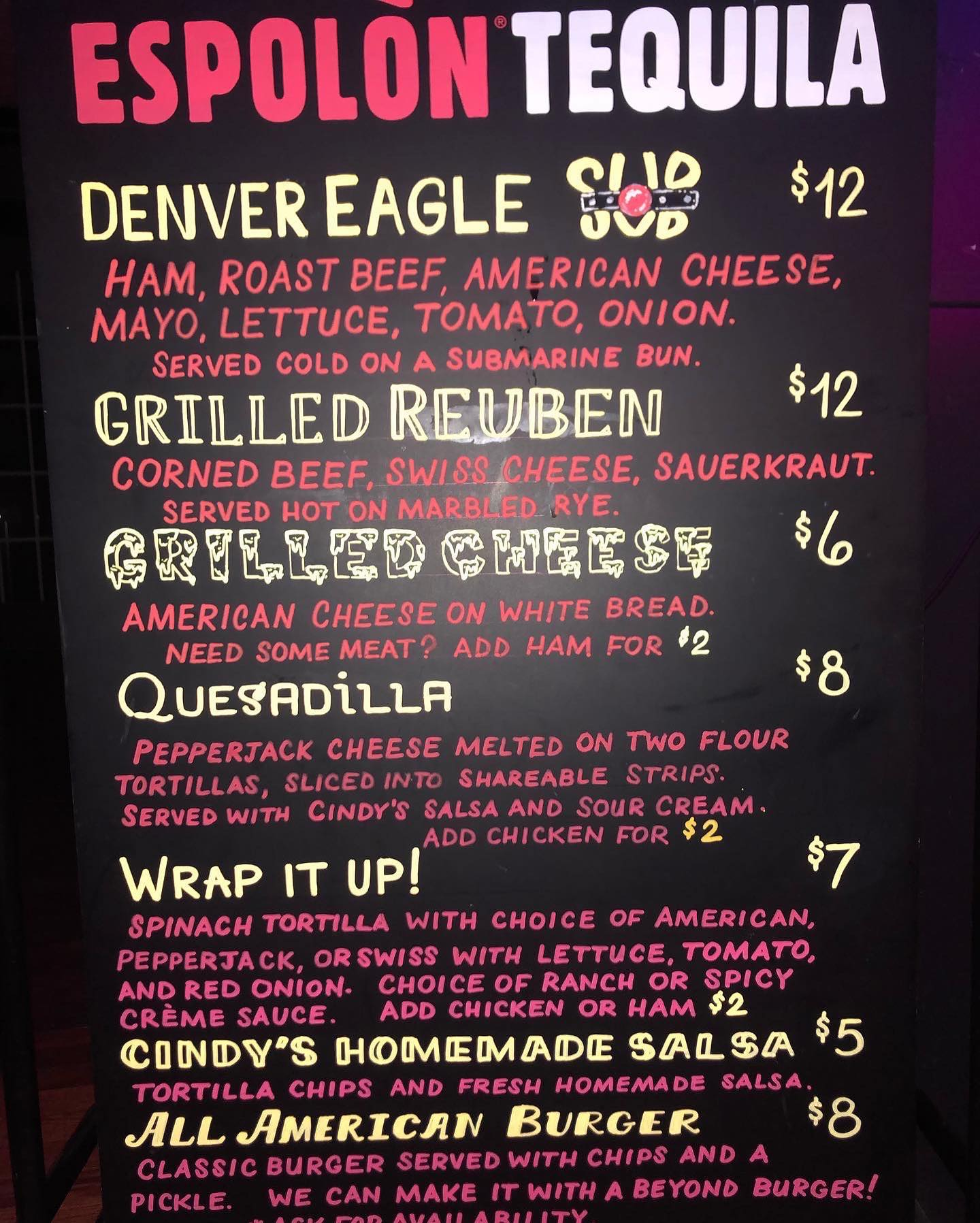
Menu at Denver Eagle

The Eagle Denver has a kitchen and serves food in addition to holding themed events.

Day	Event	Theme
Sunday	T-Dance	Beer bust with throwback dance music from the 70's, 80's and 90's.
Monday	Industry night	Service Industry Appreciation Night. 8 PM- Close.
Tuesday	Taco Tuesday	$1 street tacos 4-9 PM.
Tuesday	Topless Tuesday	Topless men, BoGo drink prices. 8 PM- close.
3rd Wednesdays	SINdustry	Electro-industrial, darkwave music.
Every Thursday	Karaoke	with Marcus-KJ Shug 8pm-12am, $4 Wells, $2 off Quesadillas.
1,3, 4th Thursday	YES Daddy!	A party for daddies, boys and their admirers.
2nd Thursday	Country Night	Cowboy dress. Country western theme; music, and dancing.
Friday	Underwear	Men wearing designer underwear, jockstraps, and even onesies.
4th Friday	Boots and Buzzcuts	Bootblacking and buzz cuts.
Weeknights	"Bottoms Up" happy hour	Happy hour 4-8 PM weeknights.
1st Saturday	Red light Cruise night	Use of red lights in the bar and on the patio simulate being in a red light district.
3rd Saturday	Third Gear	Leather gear night occasionally with leather vendors available.
Rotating 2nd and 4th Saturdays	Varies	Blacklight, Blackout, bluf, fisters, furry, hankie, jock, pup.

== Reception ==
Best of Denver rated the Denver Eagle as the "Best Leather Bar That Should Be Featured in Architectural Digest" in 2007.

== See also ==
- Bear (gay culture)
- Buddies Denver
- Charlie's Denver
- The Eagle (gay bars)
- LGBTQ culture
