= Buddies Denver =

Gay bar in Denver, Colorado, U.S.

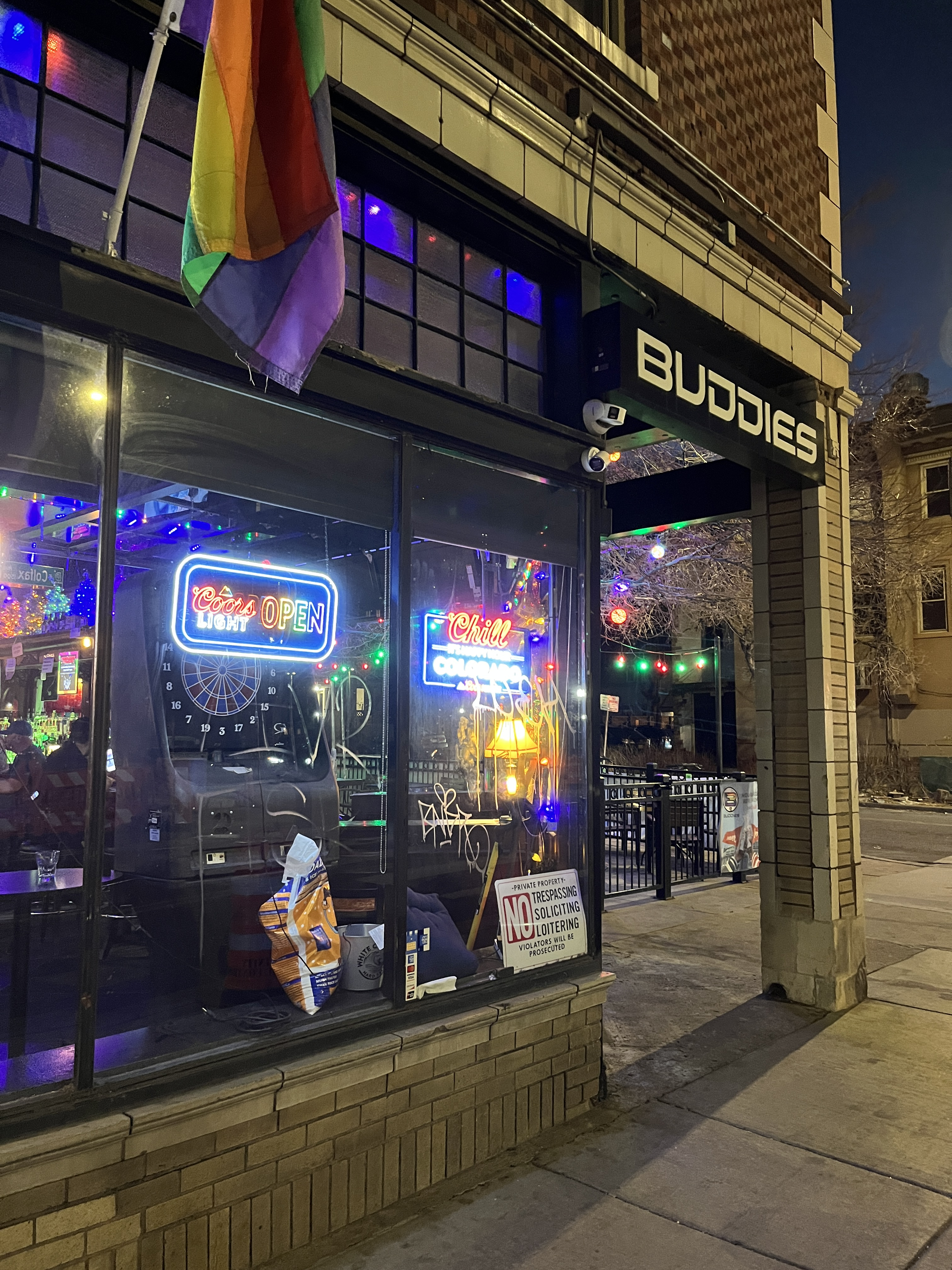
- The bar's exterior, 2025
- Interactive map of Buddies Denver

Restaurant information
- Established: September 2023
- Location: 504 East Colfax Avenue, Denver, Colorado, 80203, United States
- Coordinates: 39.7399°N 104.9809°W
- Website: buddiesdenver.com

Buddies Denver, or simply Buddies, is a gay bar in Denver, Colorado, United States. It opened in 2023.

== Description ==
The gay bar Buddies Denver operates on Colfax Avenue. It has darts and a pool table. Food options include burgers, chicken tenders, and macaroni and cheese. The bar hosts a "Booze Bust" with select bottomless drinks.

== History ==
Six men (Andrew Glardon, Drayvon Gonzalez, Jack Herrick, Keifer Mansfield, Phil Newland, and John Varsames) opened the bar in September 2023, in the space that previously housed Prohibition Bar (or simply Prohibition). Ryan Smith is the chef.

In 2024, a group of gay conservatives charged a cover claimed they discriminated against. In 2025, Newland said construction on a transit project reduced business at select times.

== See also ==
- Charlie's Denver
- Denver Eagle
