= Charlie's Denver =

Gay bar in the U.S. state of Colorado

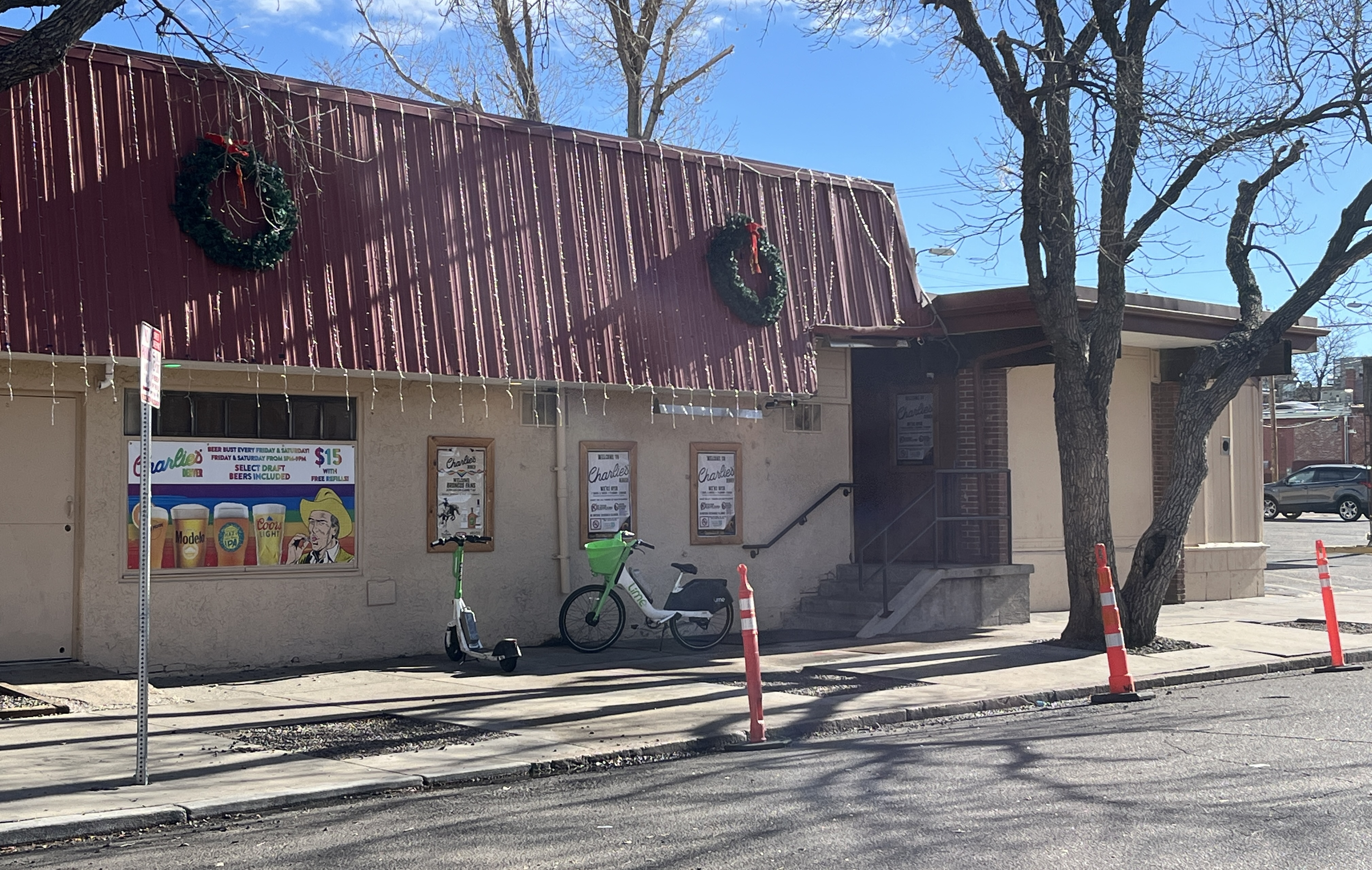
- The bar's exterior, 2025
- Interactive map of Charlie's Denver

Restaurant information
- Location: Denver, Colorado, United States
- Coordinates: 39.7398°N 104.9762°W

Charlie's Denver is a gay bar in Denver, Colorado, United States. Established in 1981, it has operated for more than 40 years.

== Description ==
Charlie's has a country-western theme, with dancing and music. The bar also hosts drag shows. The interior has a disco ball shaped like a cowboy boot. Food options include falafel and gyros.

Charlie's is the home venue for the Colorado Gay Rodeo Association. It offers dance lessons and hosts an annual Thanksgiving celebration. Charlie's also has open mic nights and other themed events.

== Reception ==
Charlies has been recognized multiple times by Westword's annual 'Best of Denver' awards. It was named Best Gay Bar for Straight Men in 2003, Best Place to Role-Play Brokeback Mountain in 2006, Best Karaoke Night in 2007, Best Gay Bar in 2009 and 2018, Best Long-Running Drag Show in 2015, and Best Gay/LGBTQ Club in 2023.

== See also ==
- Buddies Denver
- Denver Eagle
