= The Eagle (gay bars) =

Naming shared by multiple unaffiliated gay bars

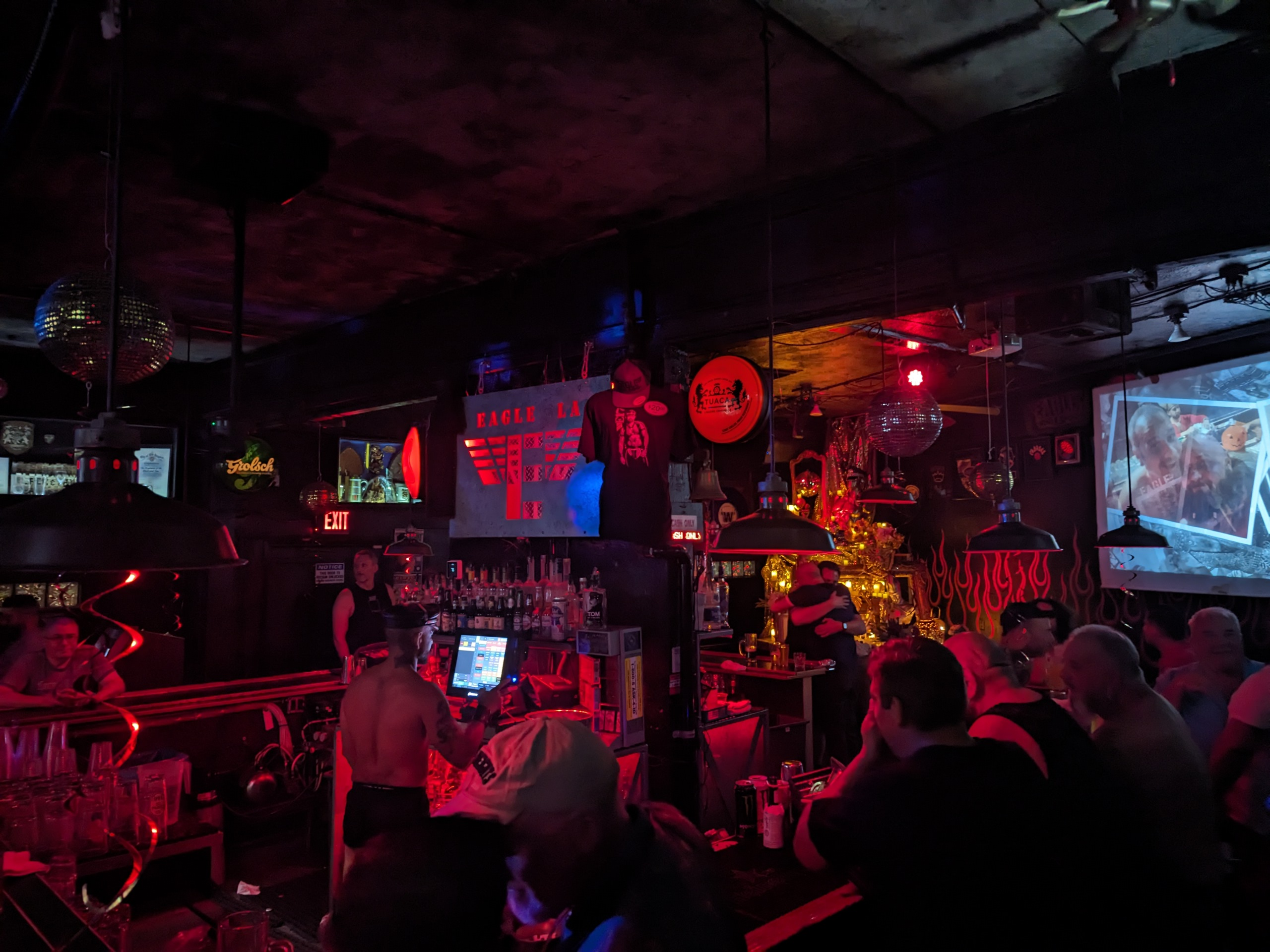
Interior of Eagle LA bar, located in Silver Lake, Los Angeles, California, U.S.

The Eagle is a shared unofficial naming convention adopted by multiple gay bars. It is not a franchise or chain of gay bars, but rather a common name inspired by The Eagle's Nest, an original leather bar in New York City. Bars that operate under the "Eagle" name typically cater to a clientele of gay men in leather and other kink subcultures. As of 2017, over 30 gay bars in locations around the world operated under the name "Eagle".

== History ==
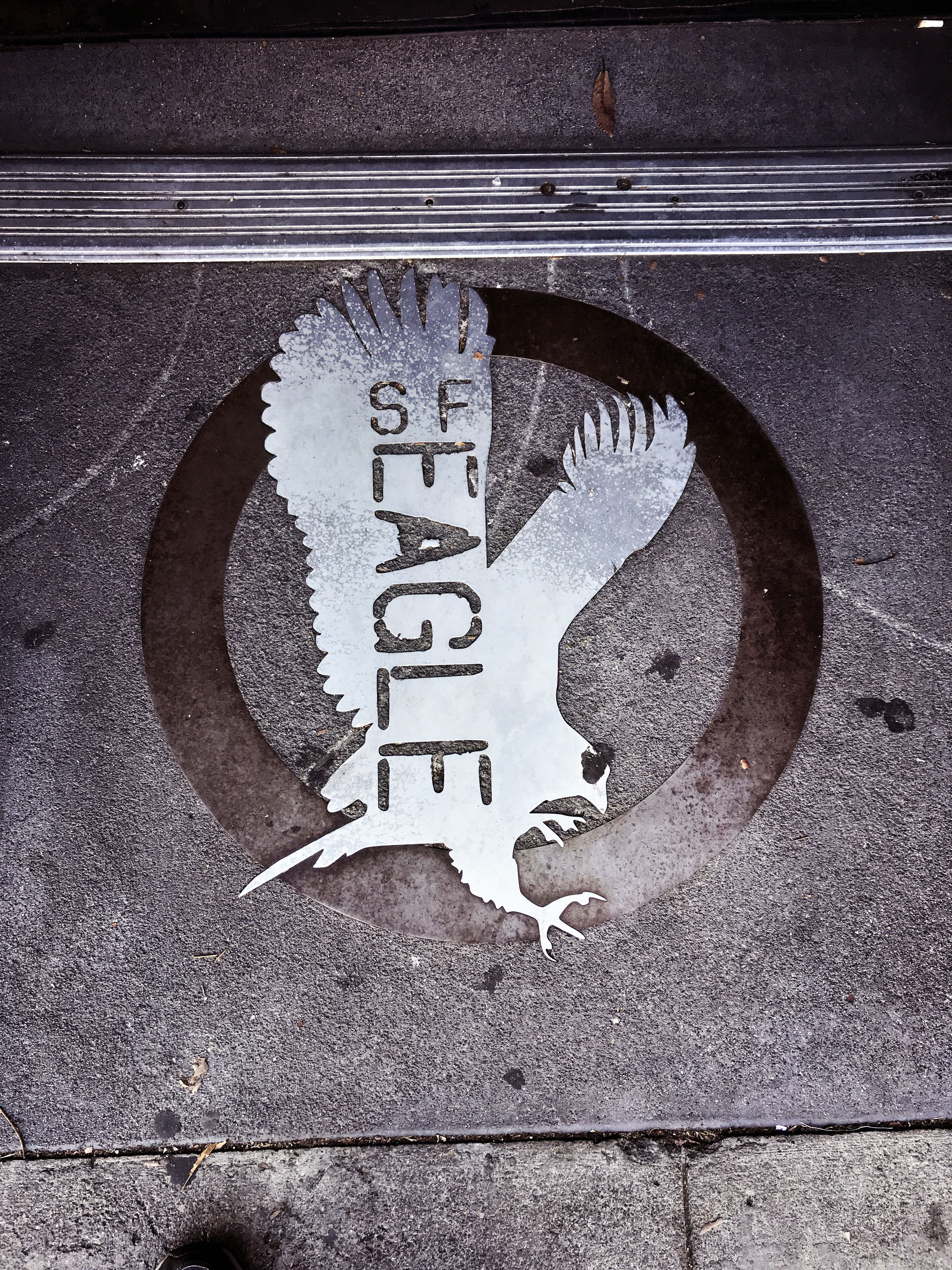
San Francisco Eagle, 2018

The first gay bar to operate under the name "The Eagle" was The Eagle's Nest (now named Eagle NYC), located in New York City. The bar originally operated as a tavern for longshoremen that opened in 1931 under the name Eagle Open Kitchen. Prompted by the Stonewall riots in 1969 and subsequent growth of the city's gay culture, the tavern's owners converted the establishment into a gay bar in 1970. The Eagle's Nest became a popular gathering point for the city's gay leather subculture, biker groups, and sports clubs, and subsequently inspired the creation of similarly named gay bars across the United States and internationally. Beginning around 1977, the name "Eagle" got adopted by several bars in Boston, San Francisco, Los Angeles, and then nationwide; their respective owners, being otherwise unrelated, unofficially agreed to share the naming convention so long as the venues remained centered around leather aesthetic associated with a gay male identity.

At their peak popularity, over 50 bars around the world operated under the name "Eagle". In 2017, there were 30 Eagle bars, in countries including the United States, Canada, the United Kingdom, the Netherlands, Austria, Japan, and New Zealand. The decline in the number of LGBTQ+ establishments, including the "Eagle" bars, is attributed to the takeover by geo-locating dating apps in gay hookup culture.

== Naming and theme focus ==
Gay bars that use the name "Eagle" operate as independent businesses, and are not managed by a single corporate entity like a franchise or chain. Rather, Eagle bars typically share the trait of catering to a clientele of masculine-presenting gay men, with specific emphasis on the kink and leather subcultures. The diffuse nature of the ownership of the name "Eagle" resulted in a conflict in 2007 between two gay bar owners in Portland, Oregon who both sought to use the name for their respective bars. The similar situation occurred in Chicago, with two bars using this naming convention simultaneously as of 2026. Many Eagle bars hold (or held) annual leather competitions, some of which serve as feeder competitions for larger regional or international competitions such as International Mr. Leather.

Not all Eagle bars conform to these characteristics; for example, Eagle London began as a leather bar before shifting towards a general LGBT clientele, while Eagle Tokyo bills itself as a "Brooklyn-style" bar targeted towards bears. Some Eagle locations historically enforced strict dress codes obligating patrons to wear leather garments, though these standards have largely been relaxed due to "both societal changes and business realities".

== List of Eagle bars ==
Name	Image	City	Country	Opened	Closed	Ref(s)
Albuquerque Eagle		Albuquerque	United States	2018	–	
Atlanta Eagle		Atlanta	United States	1987, 2022	2020 (reopened 2022)	
Austin Eagle		Austin	United States	2023	–	
Baltimore Eagle		Baltimore	United States	1991	–	
Black Eagle		Montreal	Canada		–	
Black Eagle		Toronto	Canada	1994	–	
Chicago Eagle		Chicago	United States	1993, 2026	2006 (reopened 2026)	
Dallas Eagle		Dallas	United States	1993, 2023	2021 (reopened 2023)	
DC Eagle		Washington, D.C.	United States	1971	2020	
Denver Eagle	Grey stucco exterior with a red door. Black eagle shaped sign reads "Denver Eagle"	Denver	United States	2022	–	
Detroit Eagle		Detroit	United States	1973	–	
District Eagle		Washington, D.C.	United States	2025	–	
The Eagle		Pittsburgh	United States	1994	2012	
Eagle Amsterdam		Amsterdam	Netherlands	1979	–	
Eagle Bar		Auckland	New Zealand	1980s	–	
Eagle Cathedral City		Cathedral City	United States	2026	–	
Eagle Houston		Houston	United States	2014	2025	
Eagle LA		Los Angeles	United States	2006	–	
Eagle London		London	United Kingdom	2004	–	
Eagle Manchester		Manchester	United Kingdom	2008	–	
Eagle MPLS		Minneapolis	United States	1998	–	
The Eagle Newcastle		Newcastle upon Tyne	United Kingdom		–	
Eagle NYC		New York City	United States	1970	–	
Eagle Osaka		Osaka	Japan	2024	–	
Eagle Portland		Portland, Oregon	United States		–	
Eagle Stuttgart		Stuttgart	Germany	1989	–	
Eagle Tokyo		Tokyo	Japan	2016	–	
Eagle Vienna		Vienna	Austria		–	
Eagle Wilton Manors		Wilton Manors	United States	2019	–	
Eagle Sao Paulo		São Paulo	Brazil		–	
Eagle Seoul		Seoul	South Korea		–	
Eagle on 501		Palm Springs	United States		2022	
Eagle 562		Long Beach	United States	2017	2021	
Las Vegas Eagle	Las Vegas Eagle at night.	Las Vegas	United States	1988	–	
Milwaukee Eagle		Milwaukee	United States	1997	2001	
OKC Eagle		Oklahoma City	United States	2024	–	
The Phoenix/Eagle		New Orleans	United States	1983	–	
Providence Eagle		Providence	United States		–	
San Diego Eagle		San Diego	United States		–	
San Francisco Eagle		San Francisco	United States	1981	–	
Seattle Eagle		Seattle	United States	1980	–	

== See also ==
- Bear (gay culture)
- LGBTQ culture
- National Leather Association International
