= San Francisco Eagle =

Gay bar in San Francisco, California, U.S.

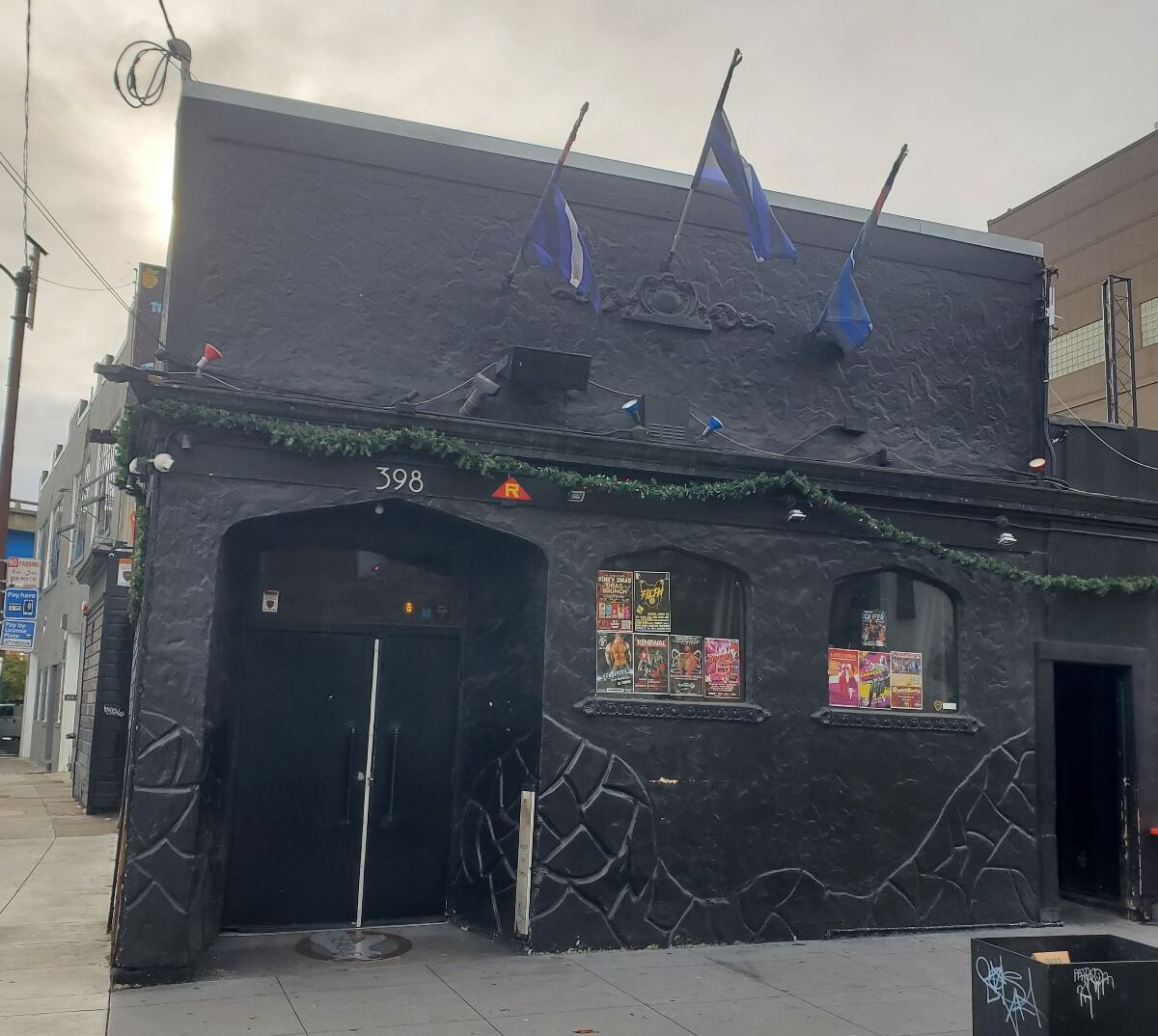

- Location within San Francisco County Location within California Location within the United States
- 37.7700°N 122.4134°W
- Type: bar, event venue, music venue
- Location: 398 12th Street, San Francisco, California, U.S.

History
- Start date: 1981

Site notes
- Website: sf-eagle.com

San Francisco Designated Landmark
- Type: Cultural
- Designated: October 29, 2021
- Reference no.: 295

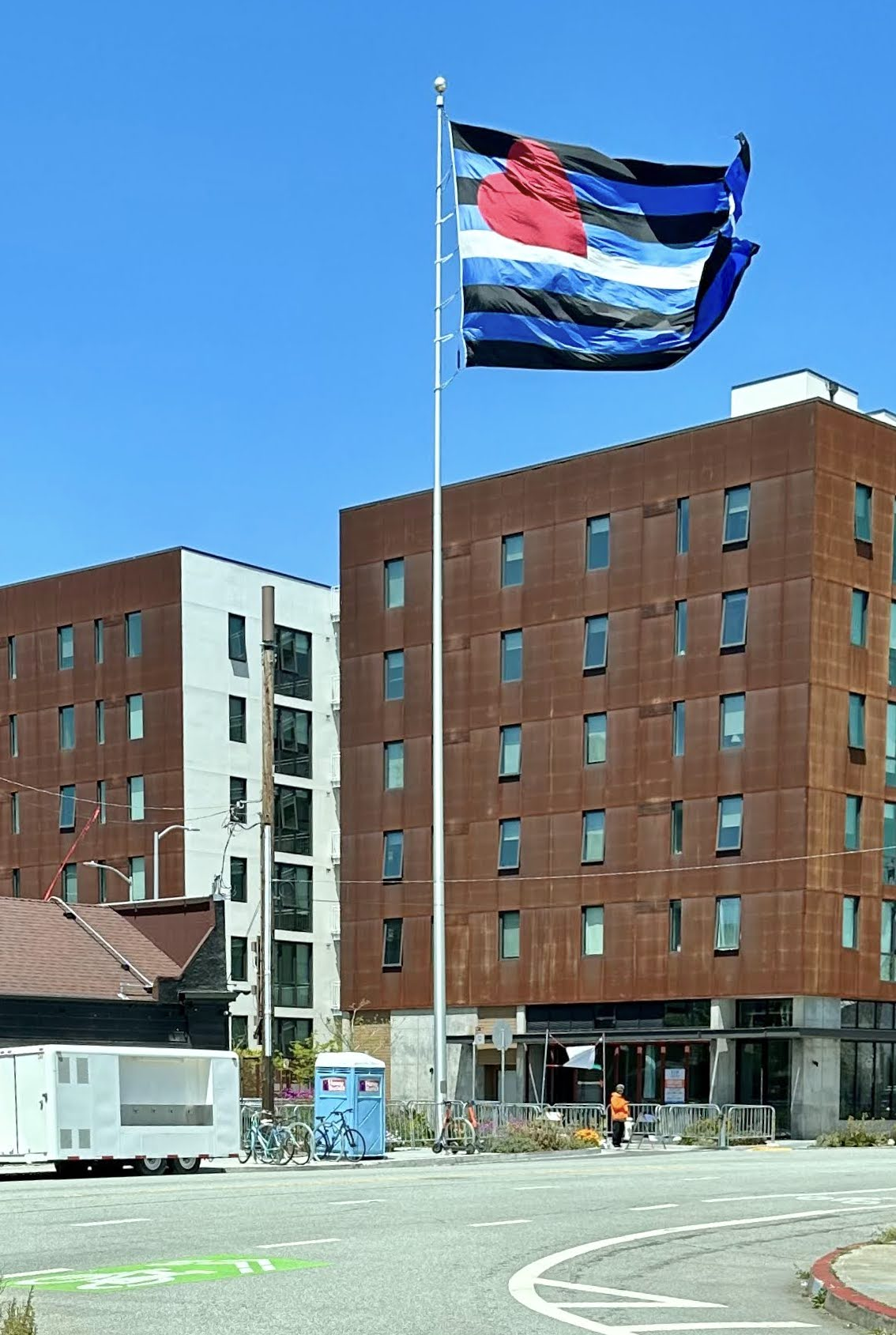
Leather pride flag in front of the San Francisco Eagle Bar

San Francisco Eagle (also SF Eagle, or simply The Eagle; formerly Eagle Tavern) is a gay bar founded in 1981 in San Francisco's South of Market neighborhood, in the U.S. state of California. It is part of the informal, global network of "Eagle" bars that typically cater to leather and kink communities. The bar also caters to the bear community.

== History ==
The Eagle was founded in 1981 by Bob Damron, and Jay Levine; Damron was also the creator of Bob Damron’s Address Book, a gay travel guide. During the early years of the AIDS crisis the bar lost many employees, and the bar manager Terry Thompson raised funds to support the community, and AIDS charities.

In 1998, it was sold to John Gardiner and Joe Banks, with the caveat it would continue to have the name “Eagle” in it. It was re-named Eagle Tavern in 1998. In August 2012, it began new management by Lex Montiel and Mike Leon, and was then renamed SF Eagle. Lex Montiel is one of the bar's owners, as of 2018.

The San Francisco South of Market Leather History Alley consists of four works of art along Ringold Alley honoring the leather subculture and its stewards; it opened in 2017. One of the works of art is sets of metal bootprints along the edge of the sidewalk, which honor 28 people (including Terry Thompson, who had managed the bar) who were an important part of the various leather communities in San Francisco.

== See also ==
- The Eagle (gay bars)
- LGBTQ culture
- List of LGBTQ bars
- List of San Francisco Designated Landmarks
