= Seattle Eagle =

Gay bar in Seattle, Washington, U.S.

Coordinates: 47.61427°N 122.32708°W

- Logo

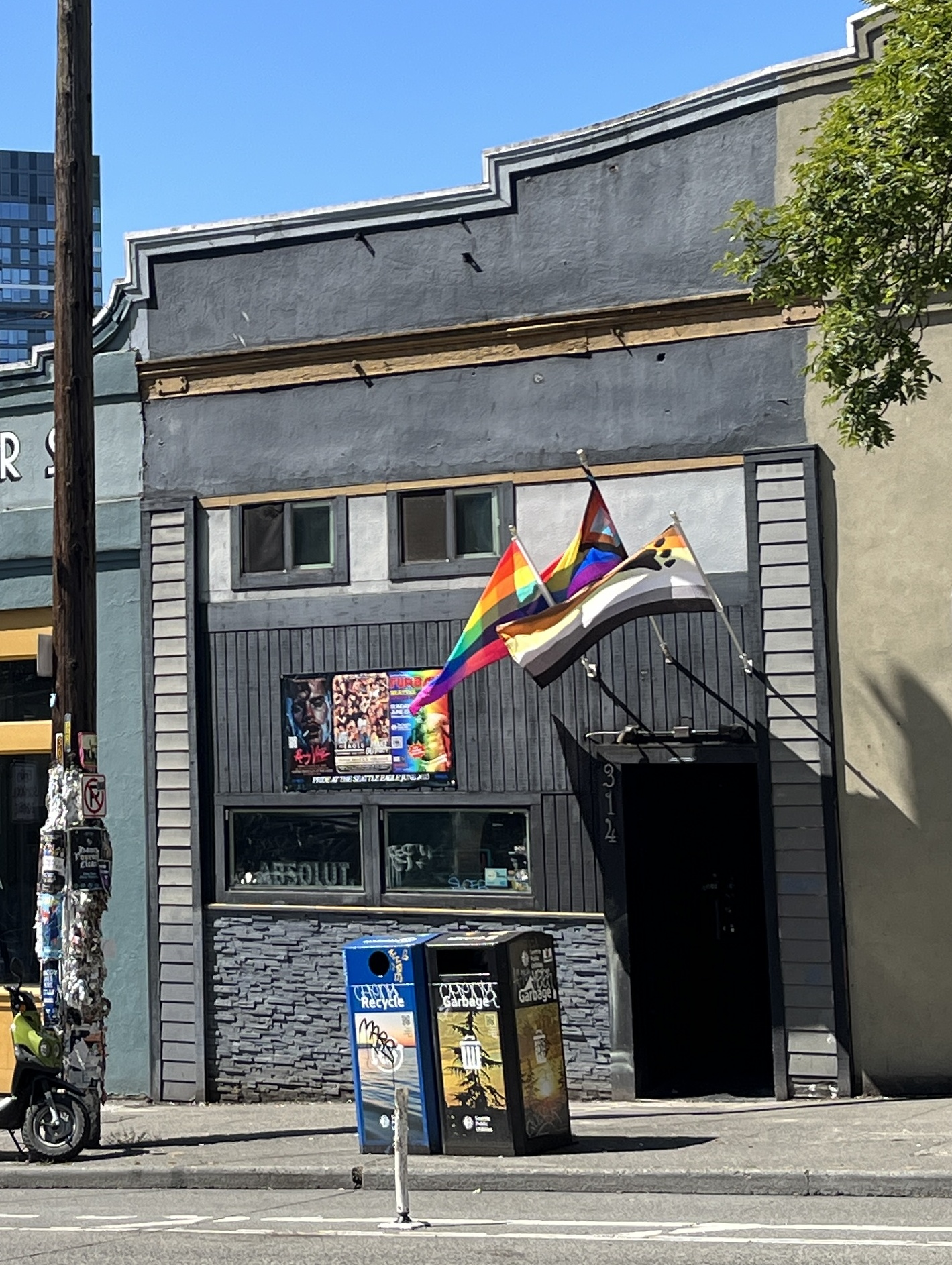
- The bar's exterior in 2023
- Interactive map of Seattle Eagle
- Address: 314 Pike Street
- Location: Seattle, Washington, U.S.

Website
- seattleeagle.com

Seattle Eagle, or The Eagle, is a gay bar in Seattle's Capitol Hill neighborhood, in the U.S. state of Washington. The LGBT-owned bar is owned by Keith Christensen, as of 2010, and caters to the leather subculture.

== Description and history ==
The Eagle is the city's oldest leather bar and attracts a "young, fairly mixed" crowd. The venue hosted theme nights such as "Underbear", "Vibrator", and "Western", as of 2003.

The original owners of the bar purchased Le Chateau in 1980, and changed the name to J&L Saloon.

The gay bar was one of eleven in Seattle threatened with ricin in 2009.

In 2010, the bar received a violation for lewd conduct from the Washington State Liquor and Cannabis Board (WSLCB) for showing a video that contained a man's erection. The bar has received "technical assistance" from WSLCB officers screening videos for objectionable content.

Detox Icunt and Vicky Vox of DWV appeared at the club in 2013. "Dickslap" and the "Make Out Party" are regular events at the Eagle.

== Reception ==
Seattle Weekly included the Eagle in their 2009 list of the city's ten "most intimidating" dive bars.

Matt Baume of The Stranger wrote, "There is nothing stranger than being at the Eagle during daylight hours—somehow it feels like it should be shrouded in perpetual dark, like a Gotham City where Batman suggestively rubs Burt Ward's package in a shadowy corner. It makes a squeaky noise."

== See also ==
- Bear (gay culture)
- The Eagle (gay bars)
- LGBTQ culture
