= Black Eagle (Montreal) =

Gay bar in Montreal, Quebec, Canada

- Aigle Noir
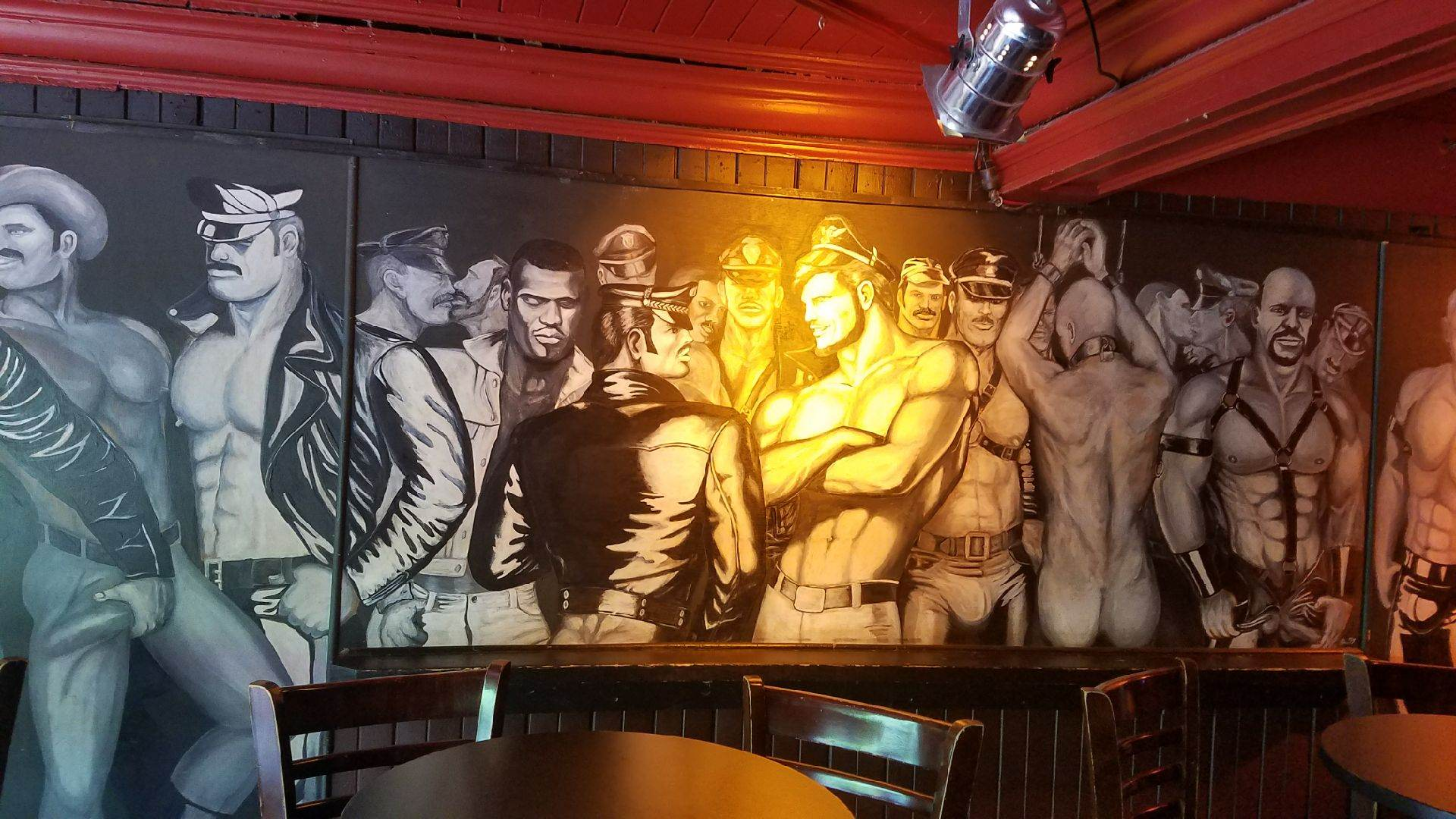
- Interior mural, 2017
- Interactive map of Black Eagle
- Location: Montreal, Quebec, Canada
- Coordinates: 45.5196°N 73.5553°W

Black Eagle (French: Aigle Noir or L'Aigle Noir) is a gay bar in Montreal, Quebec, Canada. It is located at 1315 Saint Catherine Street East. It is part of the informal, global network of "Eagle" bars that cater to leather and kink communities.

The Black Eagle attracts "leather and jeans" clientele, and screens pornography. The venue has theme nights, "draws a devoted crowd of 20-40 something men", and caters to the bear and leather subcultures.

== See also ==
- List of LGBTQ bars
