= Eagle Portland =

Gay bar in Portland, Oregon, U.S.

- Logo

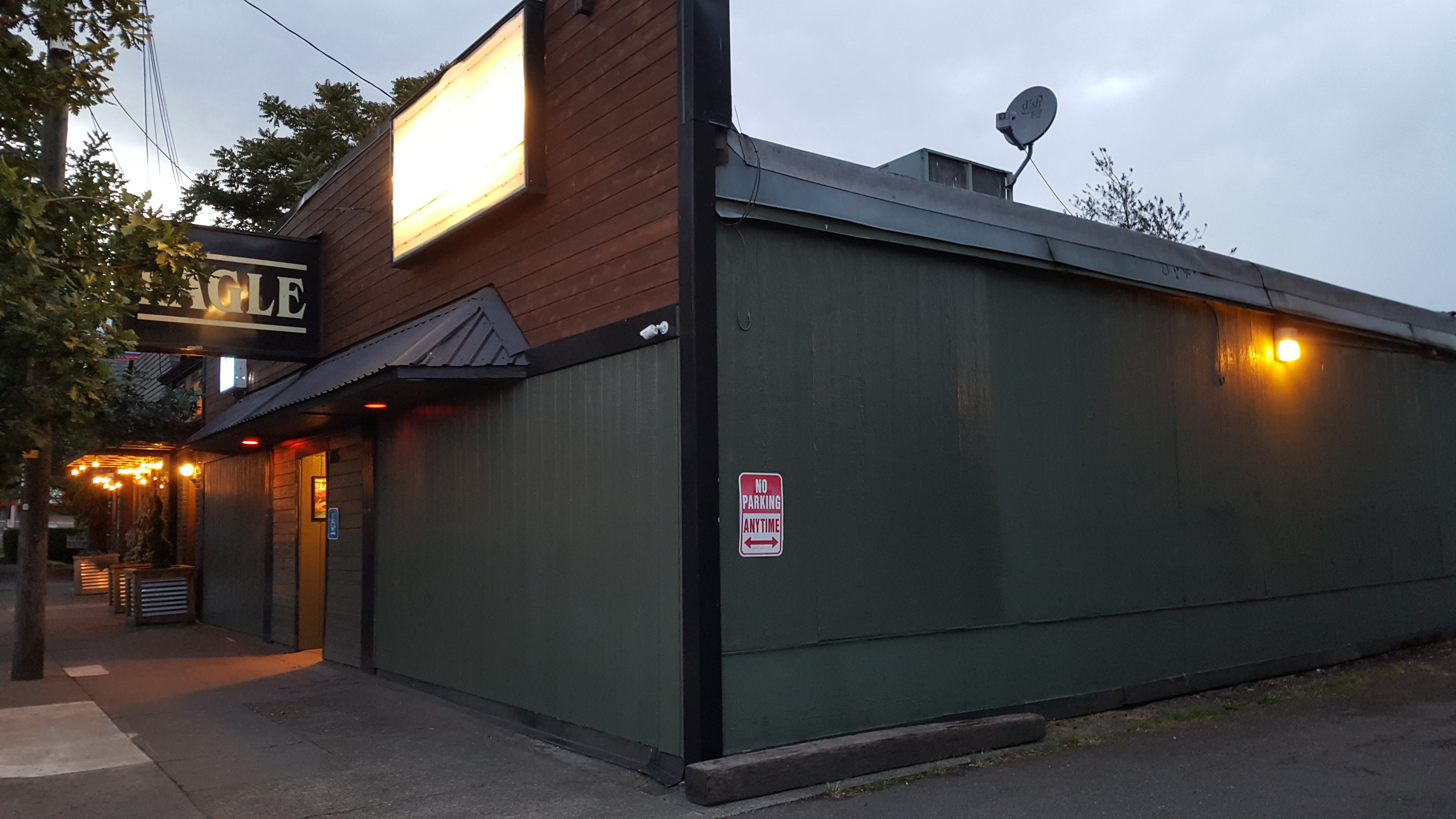
- The bar's exterior in 2019

- Location in Portland, Oregon
- Address: 835 North Lombard Street
- Location: Portland, Oregon, United States
- Coordinates: 45.57742°N 122.67554°W
- Type: Gay bar

Eagle Portland is a gay bar catering to bears and leather enthusiasts, located in north Portland, Oregon, United States.

== Description and history ==
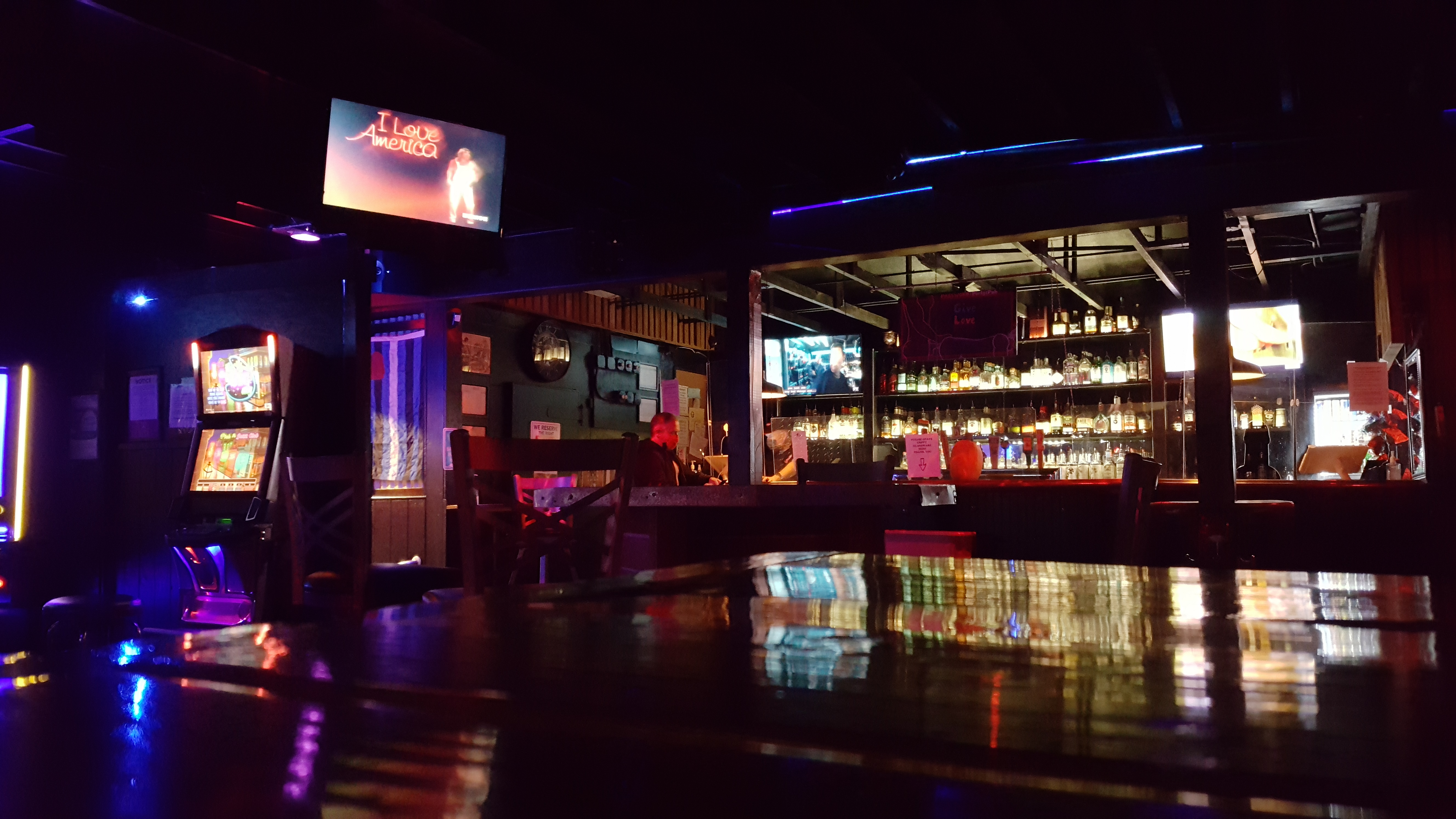
The bar's interior in 2020, during the COVID-19 pandemic

Eagle Portland is a gay bar located at 835 North Lombard Street in Portland's Piedmont neighborhood. It caters to bears and men into leather. The bar is the "official home" of the Oregon Bears. According to Travel Portland, the bar sometimes hosts lesbian nights. Pat Lanagan was an owner, but the bar was sold to former manager Dan Henderson c. 2019.

In his 2019 "overview of Portland's LGBTQ+ nightlife for the newcomer", Andrew Jankowski of the Portland Mercury wrote: "Eagle is under new management, but that hasn’t affected the vibe at this North Portland gay bar. Eagle has pool, a covered smoking patio, and no-frills drinks, and primarily appeals to gay men who like Tom of Finland and Robert Mapplethorpe, if you know what I mean."

== Reception ==
The Portland Mercury wrote "if you're looking for guys with oft plus-size waistlines and beards, slap on your flannel and jeans, 'cause it's always huntin' season at the Eagle". Byron Beck included Eagle Portland in Eater Portland's 2018 list of "Portland's Best Gay Bars and Hangouts". In his and Conner Reed's 2019 overview of "Portland's Wildest Gay Bars and Hangouts", they wrote, "The Eagle Portland might be a bit off the beaten path, but it's well worth the ride to North Portland for this always fun and fascinating bear and leather bar. It isn't always for the shy and timid, but the bar staff is friendly, the DJs are usually good, and the under-dressed patrons are more than happy to make newbies feel at home, including locals who love to drop coin in the Eagle's various video poker machines."

== See also ==
- Bear (gay culture)
- The Eagle (gay bars)
- LGBTQ culture
- National Leather Association International
