= Portland International Airport carpet =

Carpet design in Oregon, U.S.

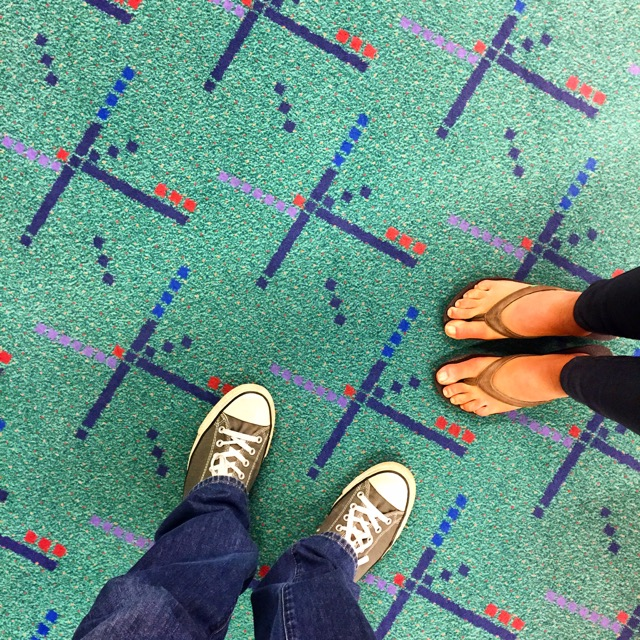
Portland International Airport's carpet design in December 2014

Portland International Airport (PDX) features an iconic carpet. Situated in Portland, Oregon, United States, the carpet features geometric shapes on a teal background, representing the intersection of the north and south runways seen by air traffic controllers from the airport's tower at night.

SRG Partnership designed the carpet in 1987, and it was installed throughout Portland International Airport in the early 1990s. In 2013, the Port of Portland announced the carpet's replacement with a new pattern conceptualized by the Portland-based firm Zimmer Gunsul Frasca Architects. Removal of the original carpet began in January 2015, with the airport recycling worn portions and making remaining pieces available for sale by local retail vendors. In February 2022, it was announced that the iconic carpet would be returning to a portion of the airport. After renovations to the main terminal were completed in 2024, the original design is once again in a section of the airport. The renovated terminal opened on August 15, 2024.

The carpet's design has proven popular, and its removal attracted attention on social media from fans in the 2010s. The carpet has been referenced by Portland's NBA basketball team, the Portland Trail Blazers. In 2015, point guard Damian Lillard released his first PDX carpet colorway on the Adidas D Lillard 1 sneaker. In 2016, Lillard released the colorway on the D Lillard 2, also inspired by the carpet. In November 2022, the Trail Blazers introduced their City Edition uniforms. The uniform pays homage to the airport carpet with a sash design that mimics the geometric pattern of the carpet.

== Background ==
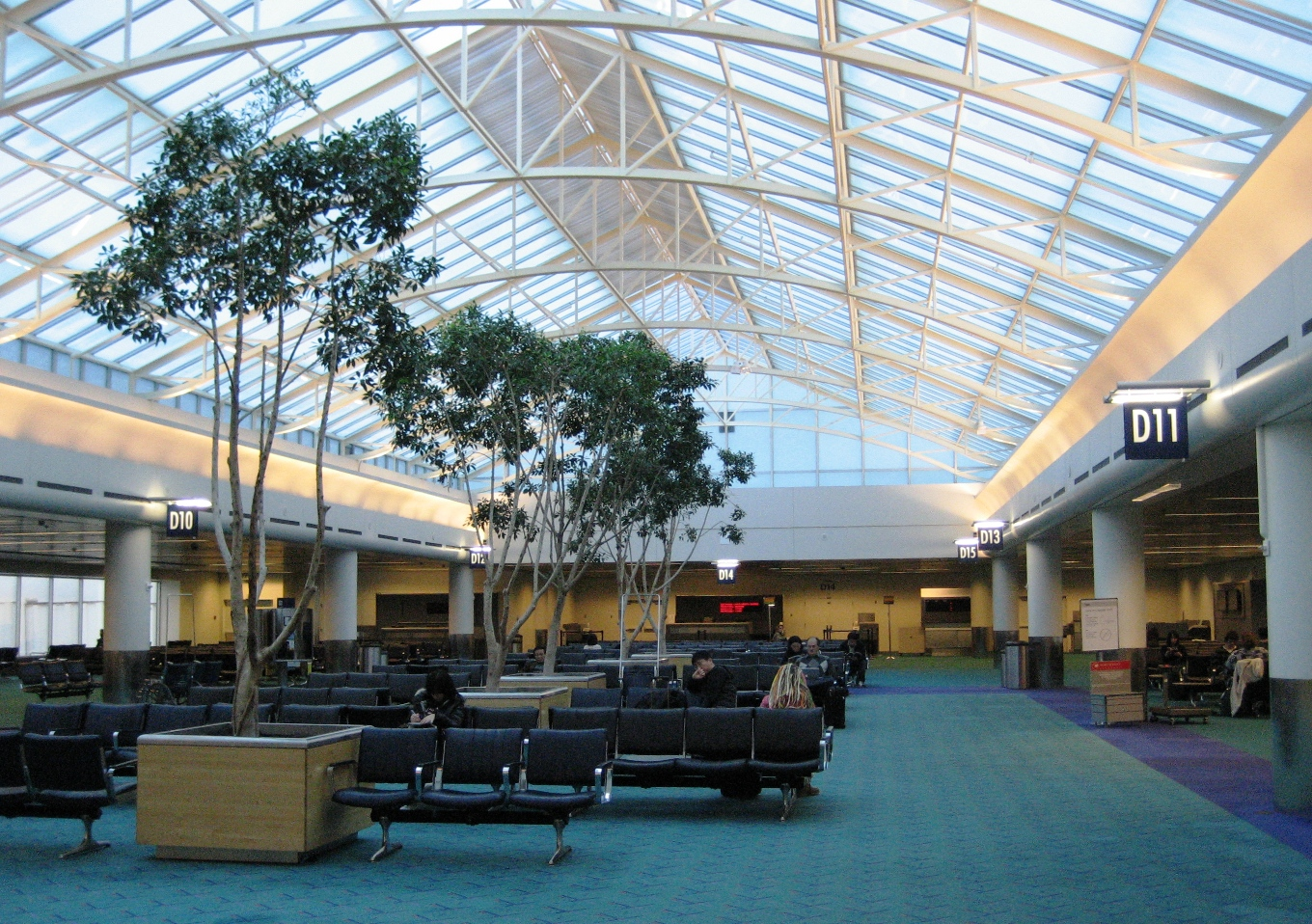
The original carpet, pictured at Concourse D in 2007, was designed by SRG Architects in 1987.

To reduce the amount of noise created by people walking across hard terminal floors, the Port of Portland contracted SRG Partnership to design new carpeting for Portland International Airport (PDX) in 1987. The SRG principal and co-designer of the carpet, Jon Schleuning, visited several airports before deciding what to create for the carpet at PDX. SRG steered away from the earth tones traditionally used by airports in the 1980s, incorporating blue and green into their design early on and hoping to evoke "northwest to the core". Its pattern featured geometric shapes on a teal background, an abstract depiction of the intersecting north and south runways seen by air traffic controllers from the airport's tower at night. Several acres of the carpet were installed by the early 1990s.

Over time, the carpet gained a cult following. Multiple social media accounts were dedicated to it and more than 20,000 pictures were posted to its official Instagram hashtag, #pdxcarpet. Airport visitors often took pictures of their feet on the carpet.

The original carpet design received a positive reception by Portland residents and airport visitors, eventually reaching "local icon" status. Its pattern was used on a variety of products, including bicycle helmets, socks and T-shirts. In 2013, Portland Monthly published "Ode on a Carpet", a poem inspired by T. S. Eliot's "The Hollow Men" (1925). In September 2014, PDX installed an 11 ft × 16 ft (3.4 m × 4.9 m) collage made of the carpet.

== Replacement and return ==
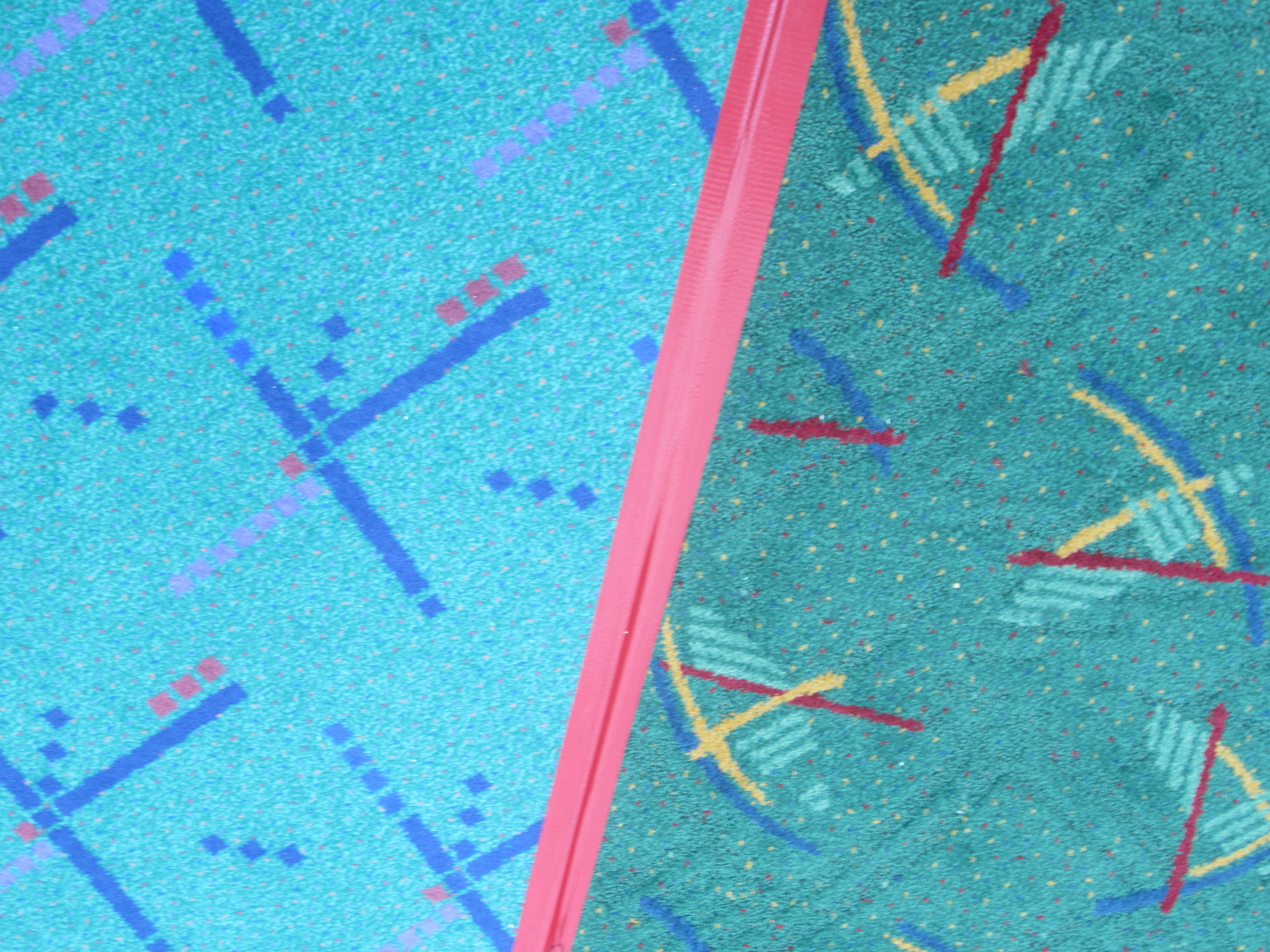
Old (left) and new (right) carpet designs

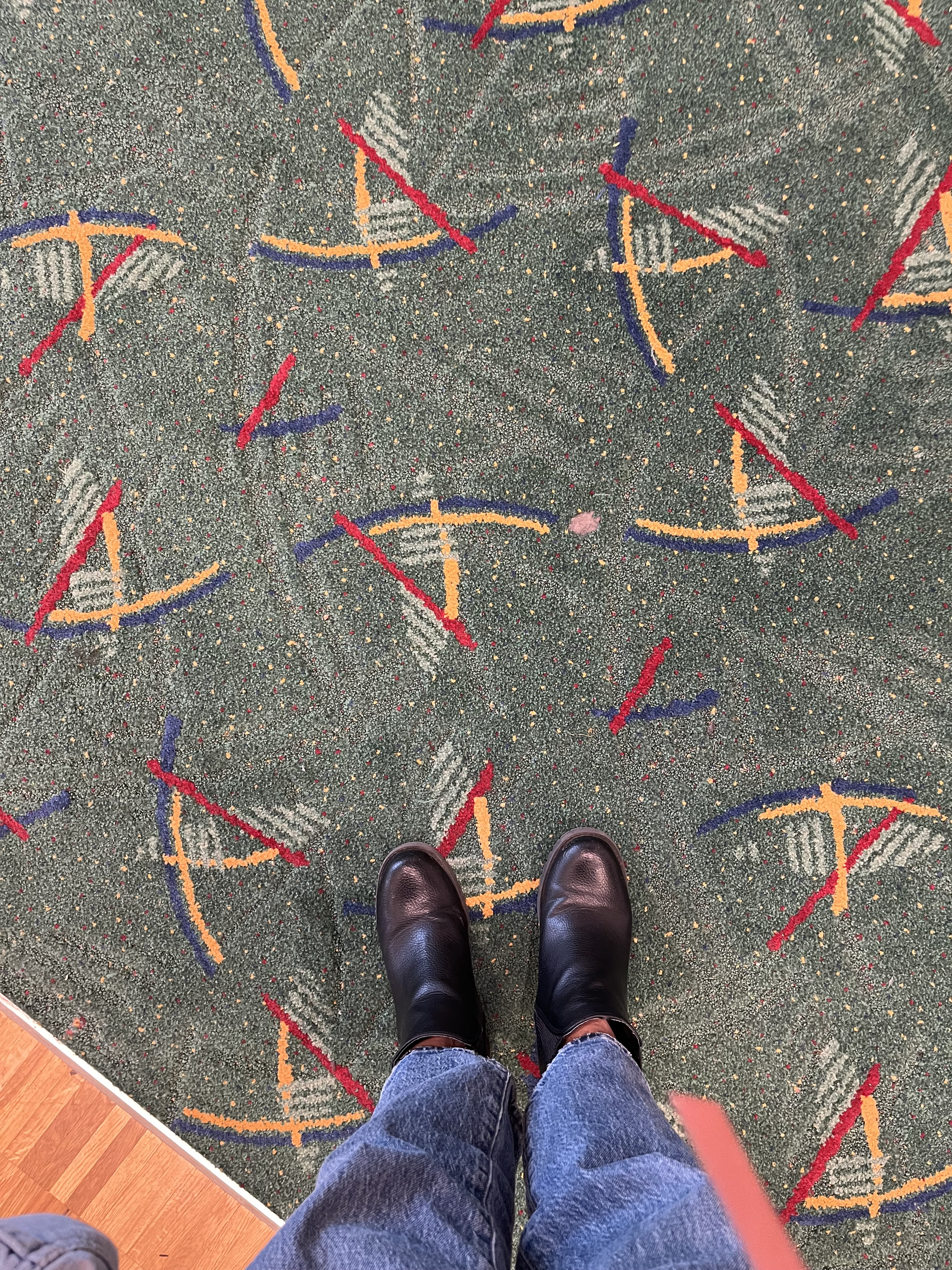
Portland International Airport's carpet design in 2024

A $13 million replacement of the airport's carpet was announced in 2013, sparking social media attention that was picked up by local and national media outlets. The Port of Portland received a large number of comments from local residents who were concerned about the original carpet's future. Annie Linstrom, a spokesperson for the port district, confirmed they were investigating recycling options and considering giving away portions to locals as keepsakes. She also said that the Port of Portland "understand[s] that people have an emotional connection to the carpet". In December 2013, Portland Monthly published a preview of the redesign, which was conceptualized by Zimmer Gunsul Frasca Architects of Portland. The magazine reported that the new design included "mood-enhancing colors and a new repeating pattern, while clearly preserving key elements" from the original carpet. Linstrom said, "The Port hopes that travelers will grow to appreciate elements of the new carpet design over time, just as much as the old."

In January 2015, removal of the nearly-30-year-old carpet began in front of a crowd of airport employees and media. The Port of Portland's chief operating officer said: "Normally we do these ribbon cuttings when we’re introducing a new thing, but it’s actually the reverse of that in removing the old carpet. We’re going to miss the carpet and we appreciate the community and the love of this carpet." Any businesses that were able to receive, stockpile, and redistribute carpet could request 1,000 square yards (840 m^{2}) from the Port of Portland.

According to Oregon Public Broadcasting, the old and new carpet designs are similar in appearance "to the untrained, out-of-towner eye". Installation was scheduled to continue through November 2015. Local firm Hennebery Eddy Architects is overseeing its installation, having been contracted in June 2013 to select materials and manage logistics. The new carpet is made of materials from recycled carpet and plastic bottles and jars.

In February 2022, it was announced that the iconic carpet would be returning to the airport after the terminal was remodeled. On August 14, 2024, the remodeled terminal opened with the carpet featured in certain areas of the terminal.
