= The Woods (Seattle) =

Defunct bar in Seattle, Washington, U.S.

- Interactive map of The Woods

Restaurant information
- Owners: Joey Burgess; Murf Hall
- Location: 1512 11th Avenue, Seattle, King, Washington, 98122, United States
- Coordinates: 47.6146°N 122.3178°W
- Website: woodsseattle.com

The Woods was a bar and event space on Seattle's Capitol Hill, in the U.S. state of Washington. Owned by Joey Burgess and Murf Hall, the business operated in the space previously occupied by Grim's Provisions and Spirits, which had an upstairs dance club called The Woods. The latter iteration of The Woods hosted pop-ups, including Christmas Dive Bar and Mystic Motel. Christmas Dive Bar was deemed one of the best holiday pop-up bars in the country by Tasting Table. The Woods is slated to become an all-ages venue called 'Eleven : Eleven'.

== Description and history ==
The Woods was a bar and event space on 11th Avenue between Pike and Pine Streets, on Seattle's Capitol Hill. It had two levels with dance floors, disco balls, fog machines, and strobe lights.

The Woods was owned by Joey Burgess and Murf Hall, who also own the nearby businesses Cuff Complex, Elliott Bay Book Company, Oddfellows Cafe and Bar, and Queer Bar. It operated in the space previously occupied by the restaurant and bar Grim's Provisions and Spirits, which had an upstairs venue and dance club also called The Woods.

The Woods hosted pop-ups, starting with Christmas Dive Bar in 2023. In 2024, The Woods hosted Mystic Motel and a second iteration of Christmas Dive Bar. In mid 2025, the space temporarily housed Post Options after the mail business and neighboring bar Unicorn suffered fire damage. The Woods closed permanently and will be replaced by the all-ages venue 'Eleven : Eleven'.

=== Christmas Dive Bar ===
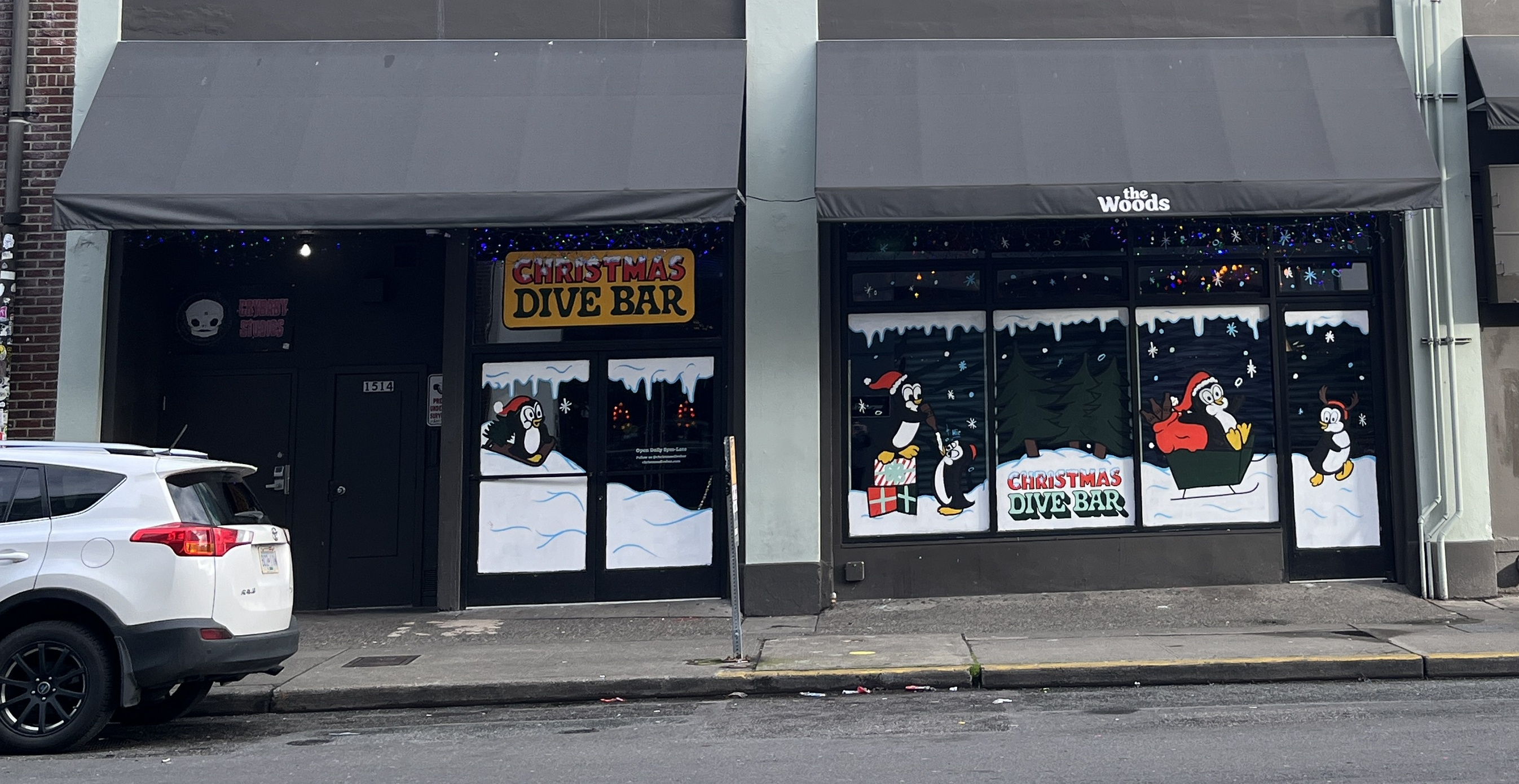
Exterior of Christmas Dive Bar in January 2024

The first iteration of the holiday-themed Christmas Dive Bar was held from November 16 to December 31, 2023. It featured "floor-to-ceiling kitschy" decorations and a special menu, according to KING-TV. In addition to holiday film projections, the interior had Christmas lights, a Christmas tree, a hearth with a fireplace, garland, large Christmas ornaments and snowflakes hanging from the ceiling, and a wall with gift bows. Upstairs, a seating area and bar intended to resemble a ski chalet, called the Chug and Cheers Chalet, was decorated with fake snow, fur throws, and lanterns.

The drink menu had "naughty" and "nice" lists; options included the Eggnog Espresso Martini, the Merry Ube Coco, and Santa's Sangria. The Cider Smash had whisky, lemon, cinnamon simple syrup, and apple cider, and the Fireside Old Fashioned included bourbon, bitters, and marshmallow syrup. The menu also included slow-cooked "lil smokies" (bite-sized smoked sausages), popcorn, cheese balls, Little Debbie snacks, homemade Chex Mix, and hot chocolate with marshmallows. In 2023, Christmas Dive Bar was included in Tasting Table's list of the 23 best holiday pop-up bars in the U.S., as well as The Infatuation's list of 12 bars and restaurants with "over-the-top" holiday decorations.

Christmas Dive Bar returned in 2024, with the Sleigh N' Sip Lodge on the third floor. Among holiday-themed drinks is a gingerbread old-fashioned, a Grinch Martini, the Christmas Cactus with tequila, and hot cider. In November 2025, Queer Bar announced it would host Christmas Dive Bar for eight weeks. The drag show How the Queens Stole Christmas will be held on weekends during Christmas Dive Bar.

=== Mystic Motel ===
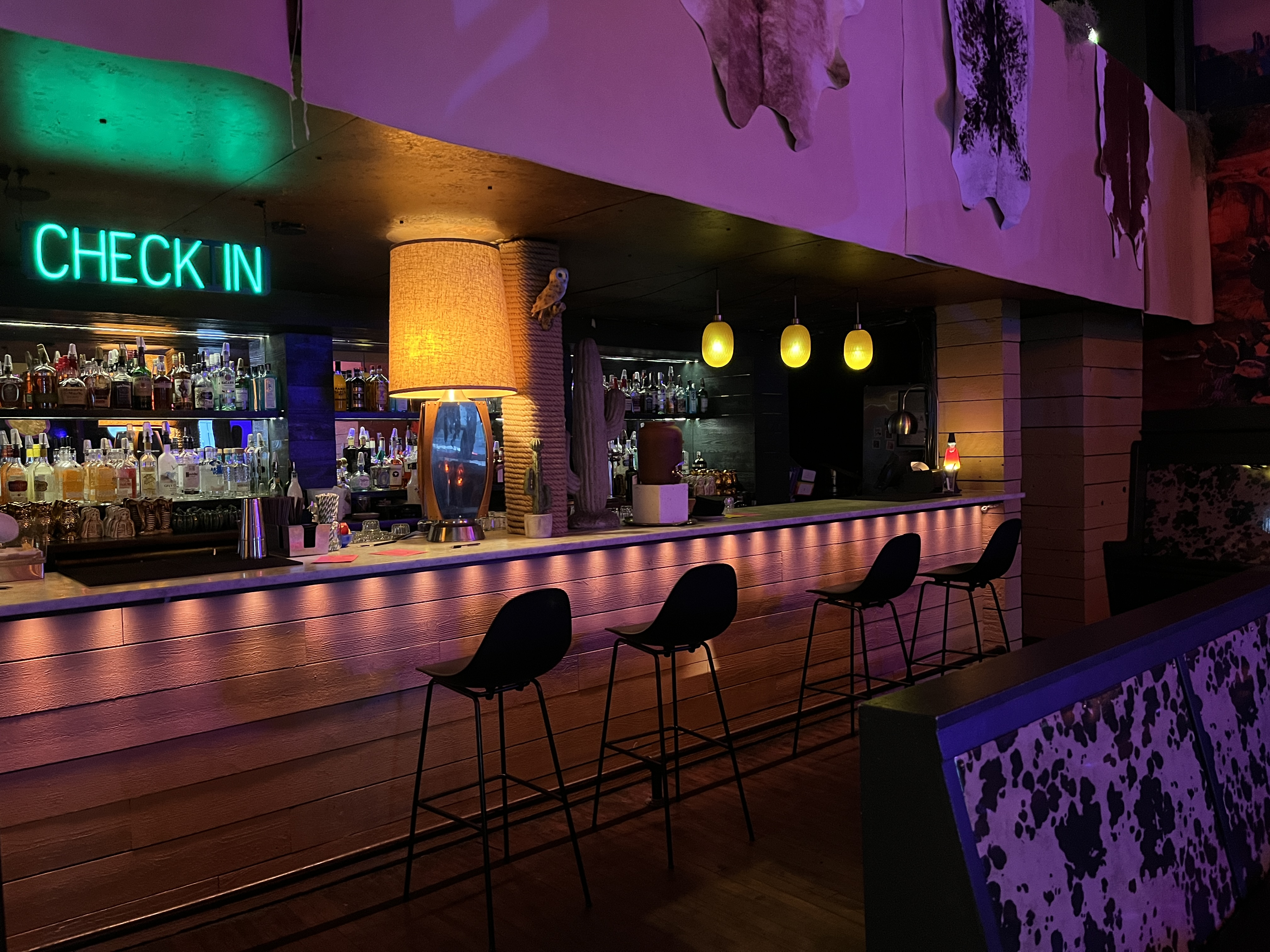
Interior of Mystic Motel in 2024

In April 2024, The Woods began hosting Mystic Motel, a desert-themed pop-up described in a press release as a "transportive space that takes guests out of the clouds and rain of Seattle and into a Wes Anderson-esque 1970s 'theme park' of a dusty desert roadside motel". Mystic Motel had fake cacti and campfires, an interior Starlight Lounge, and an outside "campfire-esque" seating area. The drink menu had desert-themed cocktails, including the Cactus Cooler, the Cobra Margarita, the Sarsaparilla Old Fashioned, and the Sedona Sunrise.

== See also ==
- List of defunct restaurants of the United States
- List of restaurants in Seattle
