= Lake Forest Park, Washington =

City in Washington, United States

- City
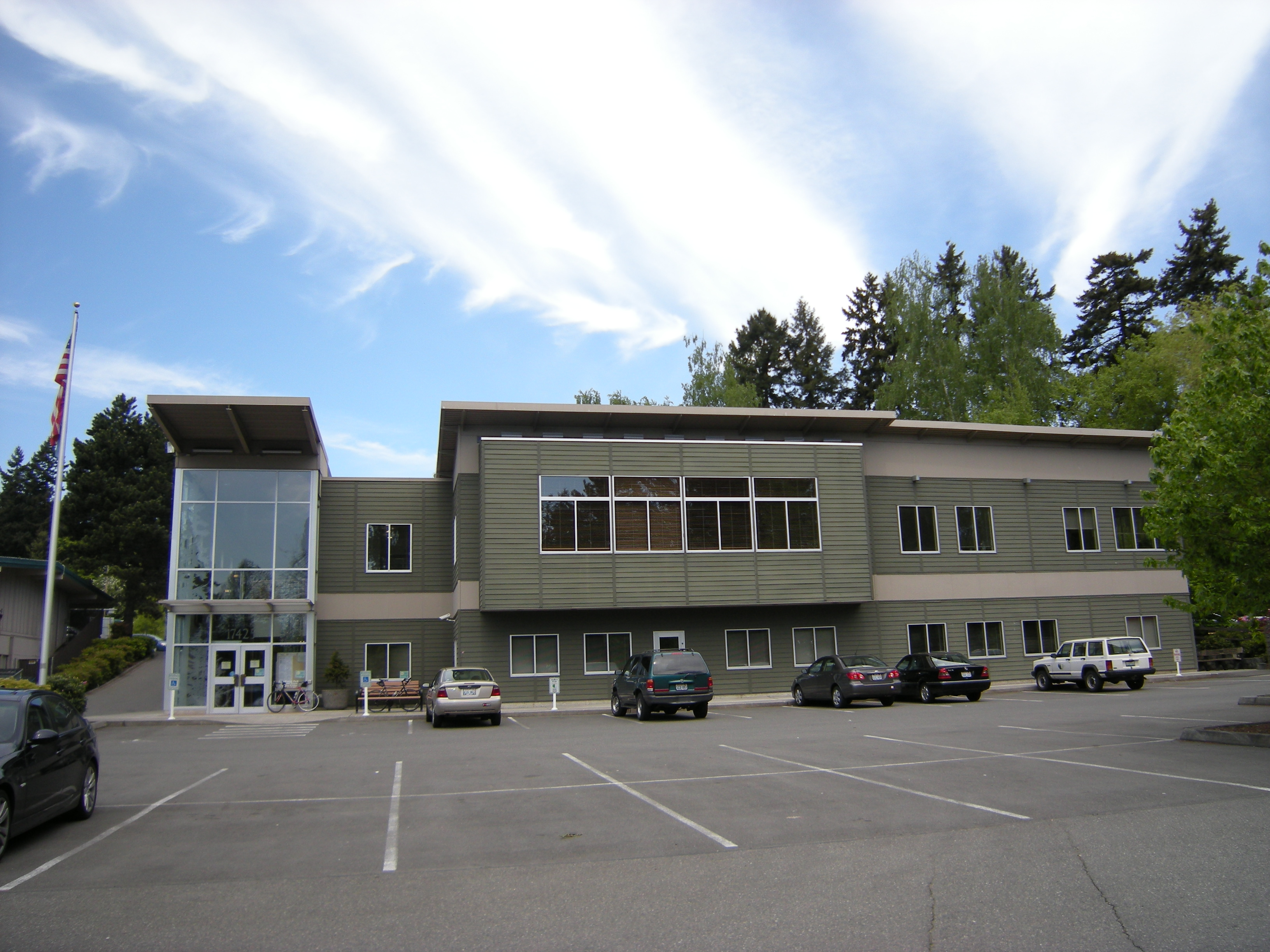
- City hall

- Seal

- Location of Lake Forest Park in King County and Washington
- Coordinates: 47°45′04″N 122°17′09″W
- Country: United States
- State: Washington
- County: King
- Incorporated: June 20, 1961

Government
  - Type: Mayor–council
  - Mayor: Tom French

Area
  - Total: 4.15 sq mi (10.74 km^{2})
  - Land: 3.52 sq mi (9.11 km^{2})
  - Water: 0.63 sq mi (1.63 km^{2})
- Elevation: 75 ft (23 m)

Population (2020)
  - Total: 13,630
  - Density: 3,839.7/sq mi (1,482.51/km^{2})
- Time zone: UTC-8 (PST)
  - Summer (DST): UTC-7 (PDT)
- ZIP code: 98155
- Area code(s): 206, 564
- FIPS code: 53-37270
- GNIS feature ID: 2411603
- Website: cityoflfp.gov

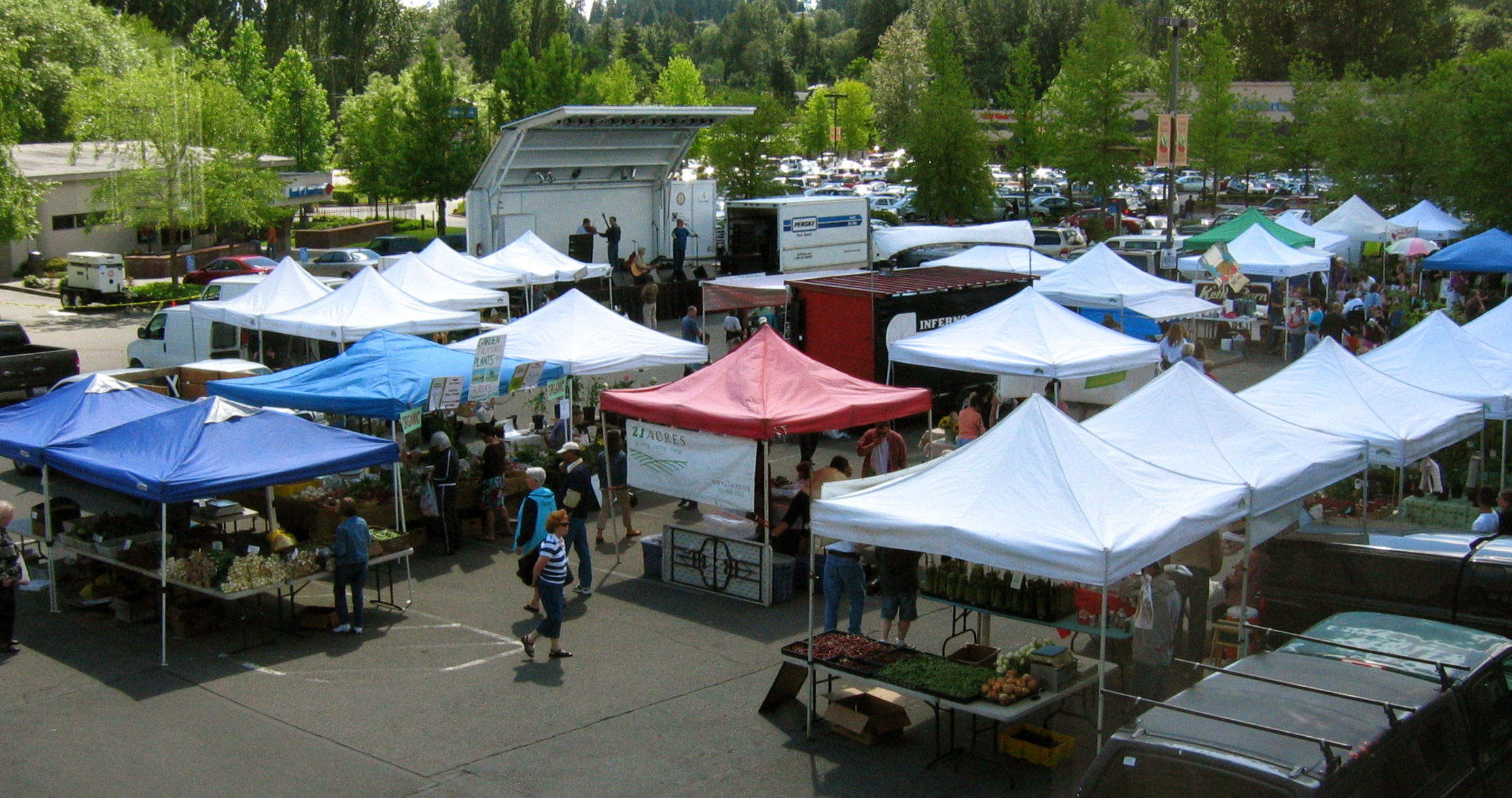
Lake Forest Park Town Center and Farmers' Market

Lake Forest Park is a suburban city in King County, Washington, United States, located northeast of Seattle. It was developed in the 20th century as a bedroom community with single-family housing on medium to large-sized lots. Less than 4% of the city's land is zoned commercial, largely concentrated in one location, and there are no industrial areas.

The city is situated at the northwest end of Lake Washington along State Route 522, which provides connections to Seattle and Bothell. Lake Forest Park includes several parks and nature reserves, access to the Burke–Gilman Trail, and organized summer events. The population of the city was 13,630 at the 2020 census.

== History ==
Lake Forest Park was founded in 1912 by Ole Hanson as one of the Seattle area's first planned communities. Envisioned as a picturesque retreat for professionals, the developers planned roads and lots in strict consideration for natural landmarks. The original prospectus for lot sales declared:

…the strict fiat has gone forth that all the natural beauty must be preserved; that no tree must unwittingly be cut down; that the natural wild flowers must remain; that the streams, the springs, the lake front, the nodding willows, the stately cedar, the majestic fir, the quivering cypress and the homelike maple and all the flora and fauna with which Nature has blessed this lakeshore, must not be defiled by the hand of man.

Until 1914 and completion of the Red Brick Road (now Bothell Way, part of State Route 522) to nearby Kenmore and Bothell, it also marked the literal end of improved roads heading north from Seattle, with the best access to points further north and east being by boat across Lake Washington or the Seattle, Lake Shore and Eastern Railway.

Lake Forest Park officially incorporated on June 20, 1961, in large part to help maintain its specific identity. The town remained small - under 5,000 in population - until the 1990s, when a series of annexations expanded city borders significantly and more than doubled the official population.

The 3/4 acre Lyon Creek Park was created in the late 1990s on land purchased by the city in 1998. For the prior fifty years, the lot had belonged to Marcia and Robert Morris, who had built a modernist home and a horse stable on the property. Both buildings were torn down as part of the park conversion, which also included replanting the park with 5,000 native shrubs and plants. The replanting portion of the project involved the labor of hundreds of citizen volunteers.

Lake Forest Park Town Center, the city's commercial core, was built in 1964 and hugs Bothell Way, not far from the lakeshore. In late 2005, city government began holding public meetings to discuss the future of the town center. The decision was made to renovate Lake Forest Park Town Center and it now spans 18 acres and offers many shopping and dining options along with entertainment. Lake Forest Park Town Center is also home to a branch of the King County Library System, Third Place Books, and Third Place Commons community center.

== Geography ==
Lake Forest Park is situated at the north end of Lake Washington. The city's southern boundary begins at the city limit of Seattle. To the north, Lake Forest Park ends at the Snohomish county line, where the adjacent towns of Mountlake Terrace and Brier border it. To the east, the city is bounded by Lake Washington and at 55th Avenue NE where the city of Kenmore begins; the Burke-Gilman Trail runs in parallel to the lake shore, following the shoreline into Kenmore to the north, and Seattle to the south. The city's western boundary is at the City of Shoreline's city limit, mostly following 25th Avenue NE.

According to the United States Census Bureau, the city has a total area of 3.65 square miles (9.45 km^{2}), of which, 3.53 square miles (9.14 km^{2}) is land and 0.12 square miles (0.31 km^{2}) is water. The two largest streams are Lyon Creek and McAleer Creek, both of which provide habitat for salmon. The shoreline includes two private beach clubs but no public boat access to Lake Washington; however, Lyon Creek Waterfront Preserve offers 100 feet of Lake Washington shoreline and a viewing dock that extends out into the lake.

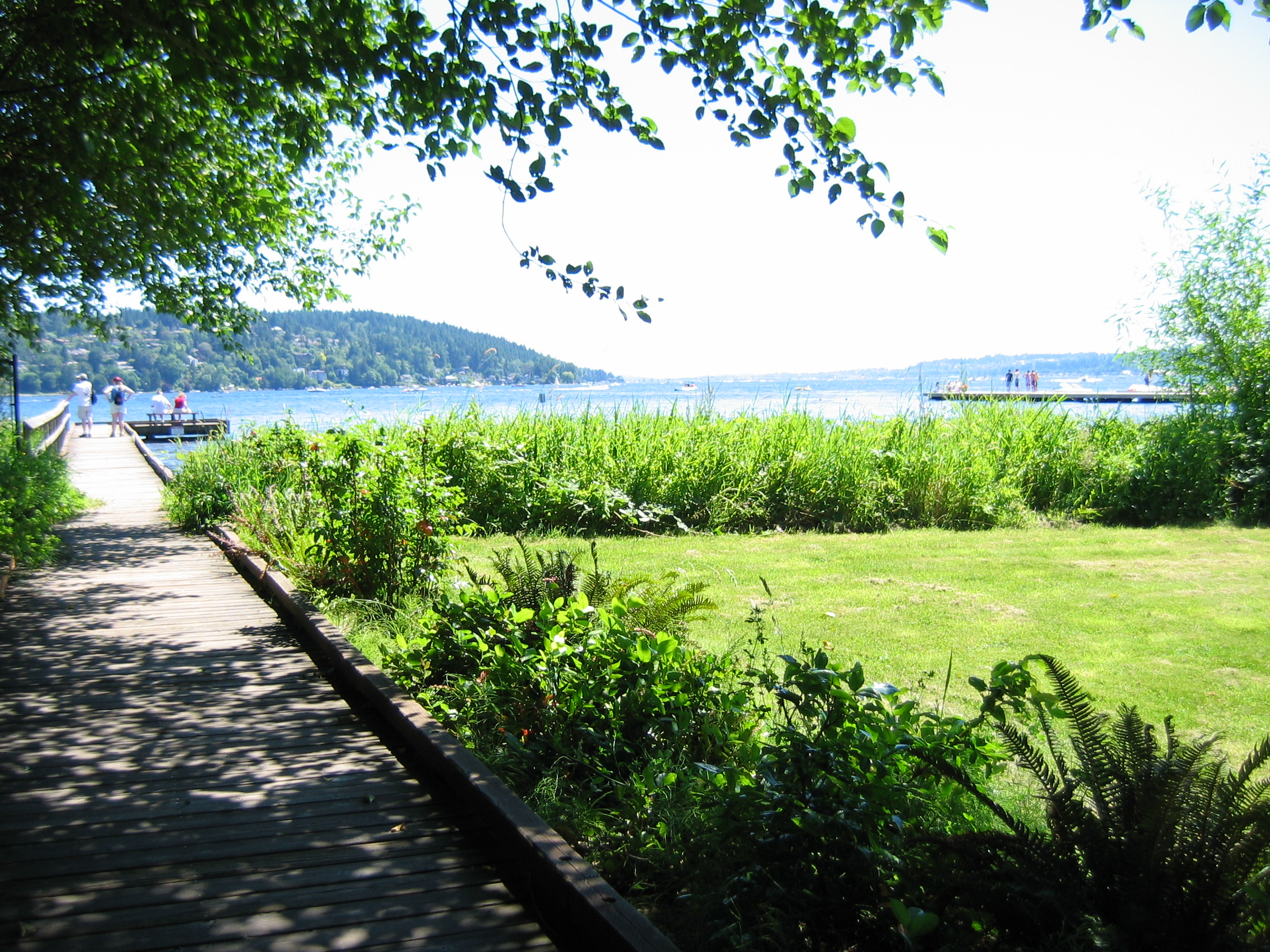
Lyon Creek Waterfront Preserve provides viewing opportunities of Lake Washington.

=== Parks ===
- Horizon View Park is located at the highest point in Lake Forest Park and offers fields, a children's playground with swings and a play train, a basketball half-court, tennis court, play field, picnic tables, and paved pathways through a natural, wooded area. Horizon View covers 8.4 acres and is located at 19800 47th Ave NE (198th St at 47th Ave NE).
- Pfingst Animal Acres Park is located at NE 178th St and Brookside Blvd and features picnic tables, a 0.25 mile walking loop, a salmon viewing platform, and a beautiful dogwood flower-shaped drinking fountain for people and dogs. The park is also home to a bust of Admiral Miguel Grau Seminario that was presented to the City of Lake Forest Park by the Consulate General of Peru and the Peruvian Navy in 2011.
- Grace Cole Nature Park is a 15.2 acre wetland named after distinguished State Representative Grace Cole and is located at 30th Ave NE at NE 166th St. The Lake Forest Park Stewardship Foundation hosts regular "ivy out" work parties in the summer to restore and preserve the wildlife habitat.
- Lyon Creek Waterfront Preserve is located across the street from the Lake Forest Park Town Center at 17337 Beach Drive NE, next to the Lake Forest Park Civic Club. A short trail and boardwalk are perfect for viewing where Lyon Creek meets Lake Washington. This park includes 100 feet of Lake Washington shoreline.
- Whispering Willow Park is found at 17038 44th Ave NE. The park features a short boardwalk, seating, and a natural children's play area. It connects 44th Ave NE with the Lake Forest Park Town Center.

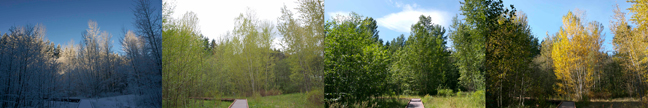
Grace Cole Nature Park through the seasons, 2006-2008

== Government ==
Presidential Elections Results
Year	Republican	Democratic	Third Parties
2020	16.38% 1,550	80.59% 7,624	3.02% 286

Lake Forest Park has a mayor–council government with an elected city council composed of seven members. The mayor is a separate elected position with four-year terms. In 2025, city council position 2 was vacated by the death of the sitting councilmember Lorri Bodi. The council decided not to appoint any candidates who had declared their intention to run in the upcoming election. Ashton McCartney, the interim replacement did not declare her candidacy, and therefore was not put on the ballot, but ran as a write-in candidate anyway, but lost to Matt Muilenburg in the 2025 election.

Lake Forest Park City Council
Position No.	Councilmember	Term starts	Term ends
1	Semra Riddle	Jan 2022	Dec 2025
2	Matt Muilenburg	Jan 2026	Dec 2029
3	Josh Rosenau	Jan 2026	Dec 2029
4	Ellyn Saunders	Jan 2024	Dec 2027
5	Tracy Furutani	Jan 2022	Dec 2025
6	Paula Goode	Jan 2024	Dec 2027
7	Larry Goldman	Jan 2022	Dec 2025

The City of Lake Forest Park uses strategic partnerships with neighboring cities to provide shared services, including recreational opportunities. A partnership with City of Shoreline's Recreation Department offers residents discounted access to their programs.

The Lake Forest Park Municipal Court was established in 1961 and processes approximately 10,000 filings annually. The presiding judge is appointed by the mayor and confirmed by the city council for a four-year term. The Shoreline/Lake Forest Park Youth Court (SLFPYC) operated under the supervision of the Shoreline District Court and the Lake Forest Park Municipal Court. Lake Forest Park operates its own municipal police agency.

== Neighborhoods ==
Lake Forest Park Town Center forms the city's commercial core. This one complex includes the public library, police department, city hall, and approximately 40 shops, small businesses, and medical/professional offices. Third Place Commons is a large public space that occupies much of the central building's upper level. In the summer, this same complex hosts a large outdoor farmer's market. Until late 2007, the city was also served by a finance unit post office in the same complex, the functions of which have since been moved to nearby Shoreline. The Town Center was also home to Shoreline Community College's Lake Forest Park satellite campus but it is now closed.

Residential neighborhoods include:

- Horizon View, in the northeast corner of the city, is characterized by its proximity to Horizon View Park, the highest point in Lake Forest Park. The park sits atop a small plateau, approached by several steep hills. Half of the "train park", as some local youth refer to it, is the park, which was improved between 2001 and 2003, also in early 2013 with a trail extension, field upgrades and a new playset. The other half is a reservoir. They hold recreational sports in the park.
- Sheridan Beach/Heights, in the southeast corner of the city, is characterized by its proximity to the Sheridan Beach Club, to which its residents have access for a fee.

Notable homes:

- Harry Vanderbilt Wurdemann House, built in 1914 and listed in the National Register of Historic Places

== Demographics ==
Historical population
Census	Pop.	Note	%±
1970	2,530		—
1980	2,485		−1.8%
1990	4,031		62.2%
2000	13,142		226.0%
2010	12,598		−4.1%
2020	13,630		8.2%
2021 (est.)	13,358		−2.0%
U.S. Decennial Census; 2018 Estimate

Lake Forest Park is a bedroom community with approximately 98.3 percent of its residents employed outside of the city—primarily in Seattle.

=== 2020 census ===
As of the 2020 census, Lake Forest Park had a population of 13,630. The median age was 44.0 years. 20.2% of residents were under the age of 18 and 19.9% of residents were 65 years of age or older. For every 100 females there were 98.5 males, and for every 100 females age 18 and over there were 96.5 males age 18 and over.

100.0% of residents lived in urban areas, while 0.0% lived in rural areas.

There were 5,332 households in Lake Forest Park, of which 30.5% had children under the age of 18 living in them. Of all households, 60.4% were married-couple households, 13.8% were households with a male householder and no spouse or partner present, and 20.3% were households with a female householder and no spouse or partner present. About 21.3% of all households were made up of individuals and 9.1% had someone living alone who was 65 years of age or older.

There were 5,565 housing units, of which 4.2% were vacant. The homeowner vacancy rate was 0.6% and the rental vacancy rate was 4.9%.

Racial composition as of the 2020 census
Race	Number	Percent
White	10,028	73.6%
Black or African American	293	2.1%
American Indian and Alaska Native	57	0.4%
Asian	1,529	11.2%
Native Hawaiian and Other Pacific Islander	29	0.2%
Some other race	238	1.7%
Two or more races	1,456	10.7%
Hispanic or Latino (of any race)	710	5.2%

=== 2010 census ===
As of the 2010 census, there were 12,598 people, 5,024 households, and 3,502 families residing in the city. The population density was 3,568.8 inhabitants per square mile (1,377.9/km^{2}). There were 5,268 housing units at an average density of 1,492.4 per square mile (576.2/km^{2}). The racial makeup of the city was 83.0% White, 1.8% African American, 0.6% Native American, 8.8% Asian, 0.2% Pacific Islander, 1.0% from other races, and 4.7% from two or more races. Hispanic or Latino of any race were 3.6% of the population.

There were 5,024 households, of which 30.2% had children under the age of 18 living with them, 58.6% were married couples living together, 7.8% had a female householder with no husband present, 3.3% had a male householder with no wife present, and 30.3% were non-families. 23.0% of all households were made up of individuals, and 7.9% had someone living alone who was 65 years of age or older. The average household size was 2.49 and the average family size was 2.92.

The median age in the city was 45 years. 20.8% of residents were under the age of 18; 6.4% were between the ages of 18 and 24; 22.8% were from 25 to 44; 34.9% were from 45 to 64; and 15.1% were 65 years of age or older. The gender makeup of the city was 49.7% male and 50.3% female.

== Notable residents ==
- Michelle Akers, gold medalist, World Cup champion, professional soccer player
- Joe Rantz, Olympic rower and gold medalist
- Octavia Butler, science fiction author
- Dorothy Metcalf-Lindenburger, astronaut, aquanaut, educator
- Adam Ray, comedian and actor
- Rainn Wilson, actor, author
- DeAndre Yedlin, professional soccer player

== Education ==
Of the city's population over the age of 25, 21.1 percent have a graduate or professional degree, 51.1 percent (vs. a national average of 24 percent) hold a bachelor's degree or higher, and 93.2 percent (vs. 80 percent nationally) have a high school diploma or equivalent according to the 2000 census.

The community is in the Shoreline School District. There are two public schools (Brookside Elementary and Lake Forest Park Elementary) which are operated by the district.
