= Queer Bar (Seattle) =

Queer bar in Seattle, Washington, U.S.

- Logo

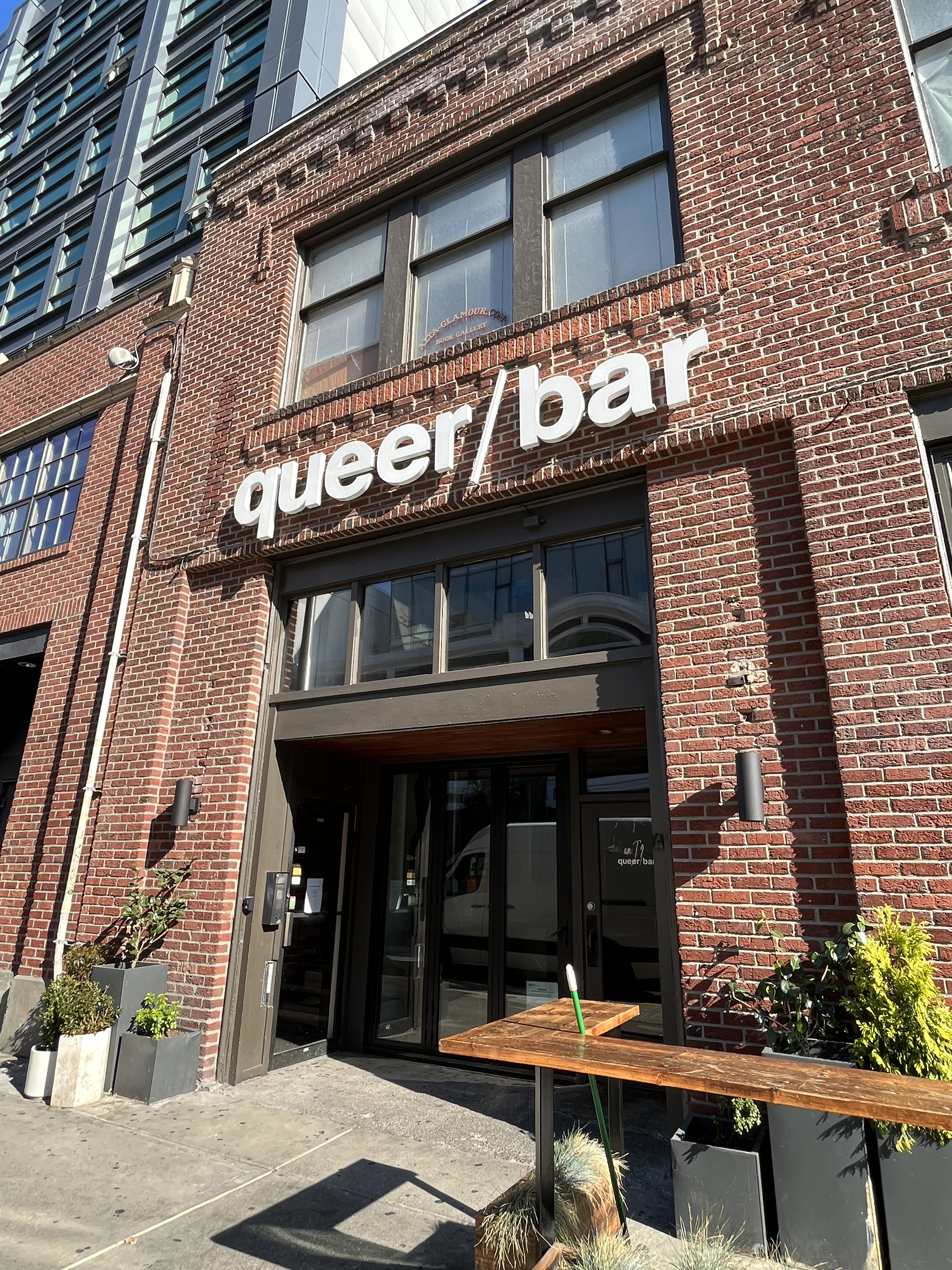
- The bar's exterior, 2022
- Interactive map of Queer Bar
- Address: 1518 11th Avenue
- Location: Seattle, Washington, U.S.
- Coordinates: 47.61478°N 122.31789°W

Website
- thequeerbar.com

Queer Bar (stylized as Queer/Bar) is a bar catering to the queer community in Seattle's Capitol Hill neighborhood, in the United States. Queer Bar hosts drag shows regularly.

== History ==
The queer-owned business was established in 2017, replacing Purr Cocktail Lounge, another gay bar which relocated.

Robbie Turner has been the venue's entertainment director. Bosco, Irene Dubois, and Arrietty, contestants on seasons 14, 15, and 17 of RuPaul's Drag Race, respectively, have performed at the bar.

In November 2025, Queer Bar announced plans to host Christmas Dive Bar, which was previously held at The Woods, for eight weeks.

== See also ==
- List of LGBTQ bars
