= Elliott Bay Book Company =

Independent bookstore in Seattle, Washington, U.S.

Coordinates: 47°36′53″N 122°19′11″W

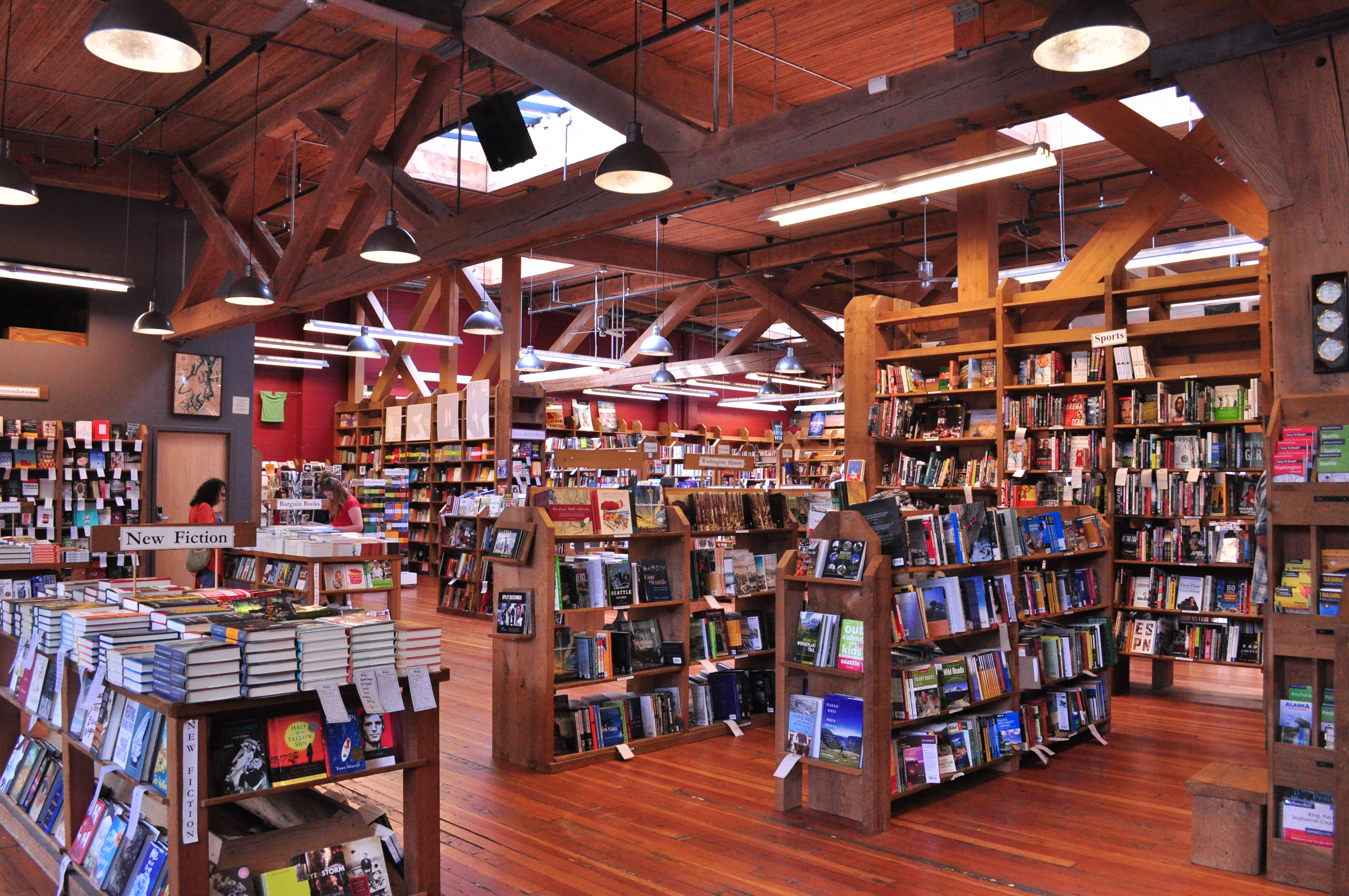
- Industry: Bookseller
- Founded: 1973
- Founder: Walter Carr
- Headquarters: Seattle, Washington, United States
- Products: New books
- Owner: Tracy Taylor; Murf Hall; Joey Burgess
- Number of employees: 30+
- Website: www.elliottbaybook.com

Elliott Bay Book Company is an independent bookstore located at 1521 10th Avenue in the Capitol Hill neighborhood of Seattle, Washington, United States. The Seattle Times described the store as the "region's premier independent bookstore" and the Associated Press referred to the bookstore as "a literary landmark." The New York Times claimed in 1999 that "most Seattleites would agree" that Elliott Bay Book Company was the "bookish heart" of the city. The bookstore opened in 1973 in the Pioneer Square neighborhood and moved to Capitol Hill in 2010.

== Description ==
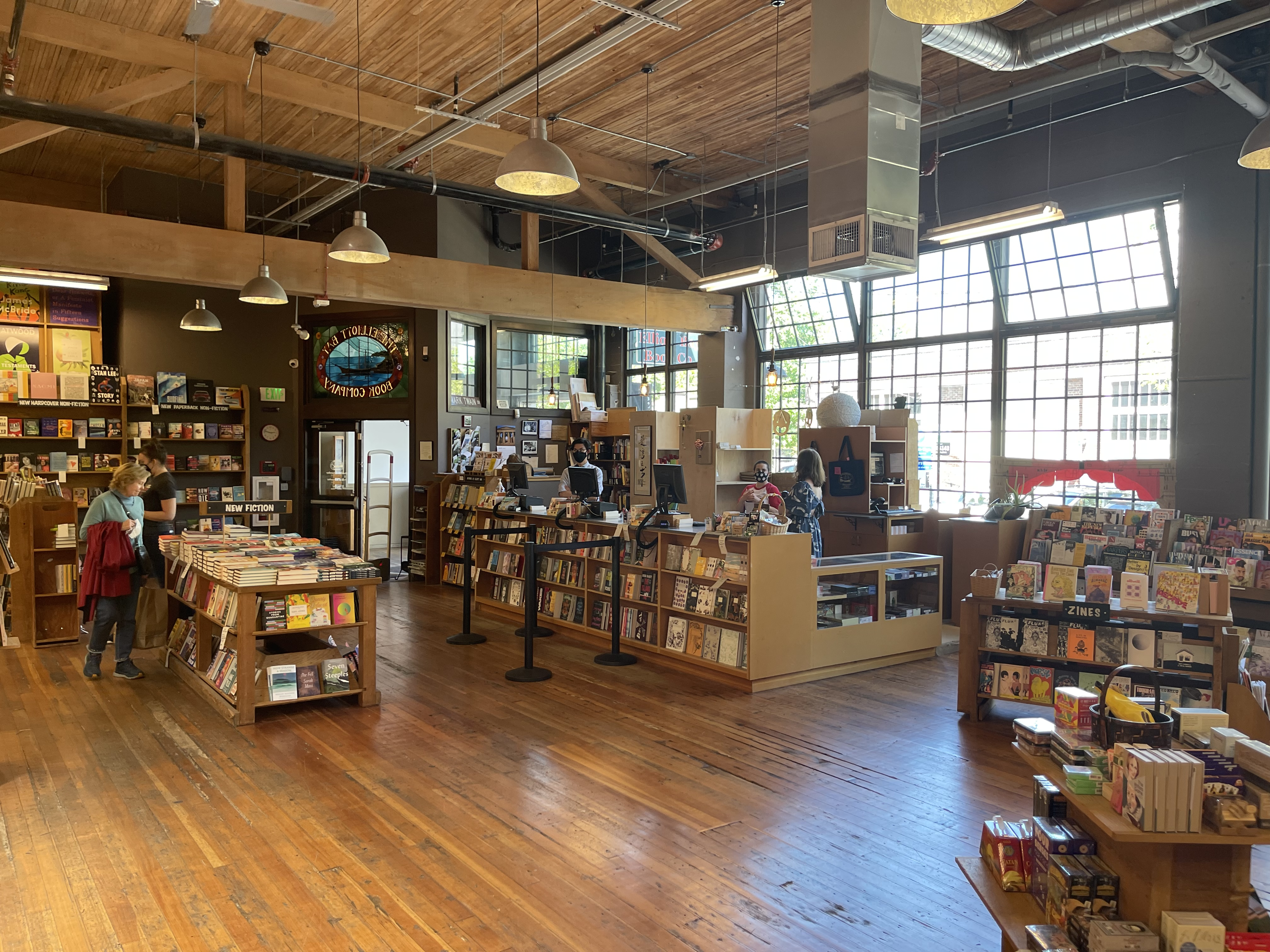
Elliott Bay Book Company (Capitol Hill Store)

The bookstore is housed in a 20,000-square-foot building. Exposed timber trusses, industrial sash windows, and 19-foot-tall ceilings contribute to Elliott Bay's distinctive environment. The store regularly carries around 150,000 titles. Elliott Bay's large children's section formerly included a miniature castle.

Author events such as readings and signings happen frequently at Elliott Bay, with over 500 events each year. There are multiple book groups that collaboratively read and discuss books on topics such as global issues, young adult literature, and science fiction. Elliott Bay is also home to Seattle's first bookstore café, with a small dining space in the store run by a neighboring restaurant.

The store's well-read staff have been a consistent feature throughout its history, with founder Walter Carr saying "we're also selling personal service". In a 1999 New York Times article, travel writer Jonathan Raban described the store's staff as "perhaps the most knowledgeable of any in bookstores across the United States and Britain." Handwritten recommendations from staff line shelves throughout the bookstore.

From 2019-2024 the Elliott Bay Book Company collaborated with Hudson News on a bookstore in Terminal C of the Seattle–Tacoma International Airport.

== History ==
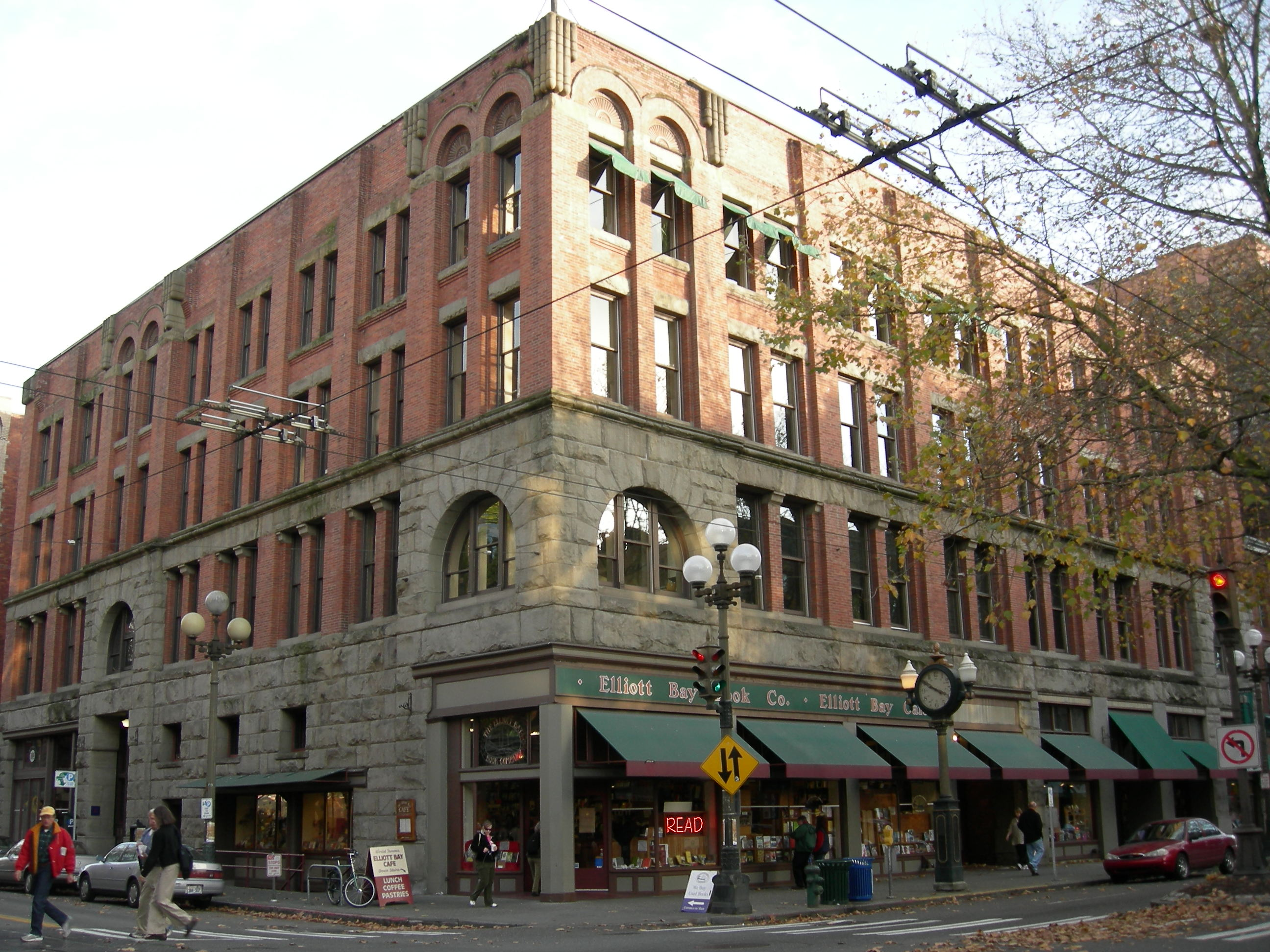
The Globe Building in Pioneer Square, location of the Elliott Bay Book Company from 1973 to 2010.

Elliott Bay Book Company was established by Walter and Maggie Carr and first opened on June 29, 1973. The bookstore was located in a 1,600-square-foot room of the Globe Building at 310 First Avenue South in the Pioneer Square neighborhood. One of Carr's models for the store was Kepler's Books, which had high ceilings and classical music playing throughout. Carr, who had no experience running a store, hired laid-off Boeing workers to help build the store's bookshelves. Throughout the years, the store expanded into a larger space within the Globe Building.

In selecting books for the collection, Carr focused on breadth of inventory, wanting the bookstore to have a broad selection of subject matter, publishers, and authors. Elliott Bay held its first author event in 1978 and a basement café was added in 1979. Visitors appreciated the bookstore's "old-world charm," with creaking wood floors and exposed brick walls. The look and configuration of the space were closely tied with customer's perceptions of the store.

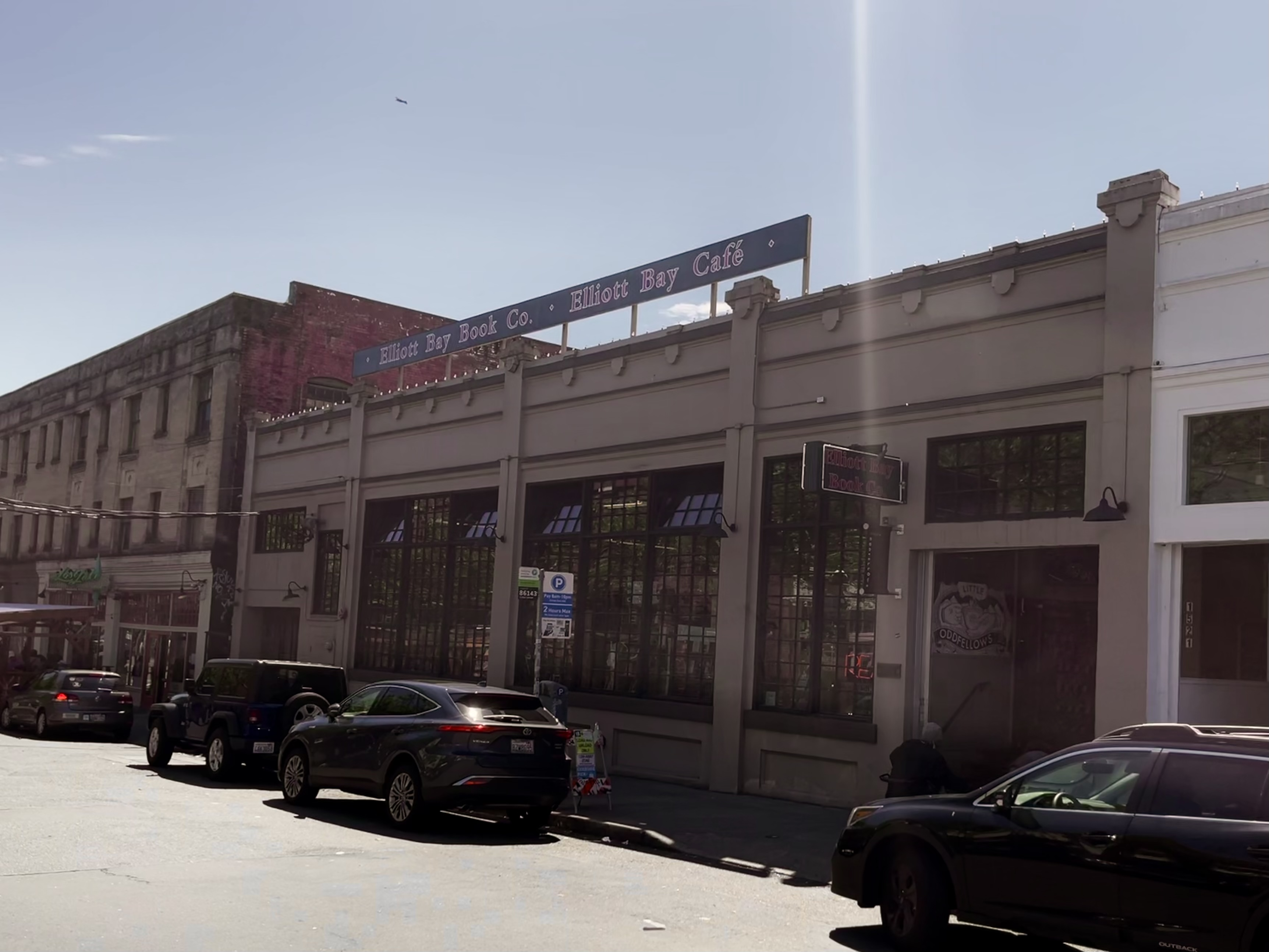
Elliott Bay Book Company Capitol Hill Store

In February 1999 it was announced that Carr would retire and local developer Ron Sher would purchase Elliott Bay Book Company. He described the store as "a Seattle institution as much as the Pike Place Market and the Space Needle". Sher, who also owned Third Place Books, announced plans for reviving the business by adding more seating and selling used books along with new, as well as discussing the resurgence in the idea of bookstores as gathering places. The following year, Sher formed a partnership with Peter Aaron, who took over the management of day-to-day operations. Aaron became the sole owner of the store in 2001.

After the 2008 Great Recession, sales suffered and the bookstore's finances became precarious. Rumors that the store would downsize or move elicited nervousness from Pioneer Square business owners as Elliott Bay was considered the anchor business for the neighborhood.

In 2010, the bookstore moved to the Capitol Hill neighborhood into a former Ford truck service building constructed around 1918. The renovation reused all the original cedar bookshelves, retaining recognizable elements of the old space. The store's relocation to Capitol Hill helped revitalize the neighborhood's Pike/Pine corridor.

In 2022, general manager Tracy Taylor, Murf Hall, and Joey Burgess of Burgess Hall Group purchased Elliott Bay Book Company.

== Book Workers Union ==
The Elliott Bay Book Company booksellers voted to unionize in March 2020, which was recognized voluntarily and immediately by owner Peter Aaron. The Book Workers Union began advocating for its members immediately to address the impact of the COVID-19 pandemic. Many of the union's goals include working with the store's management to ensure the store is investing in its employees.
