= Purr Cocktail Lounge =

Defunct gay bar in Seattle, Washington, U.S.

- Logo

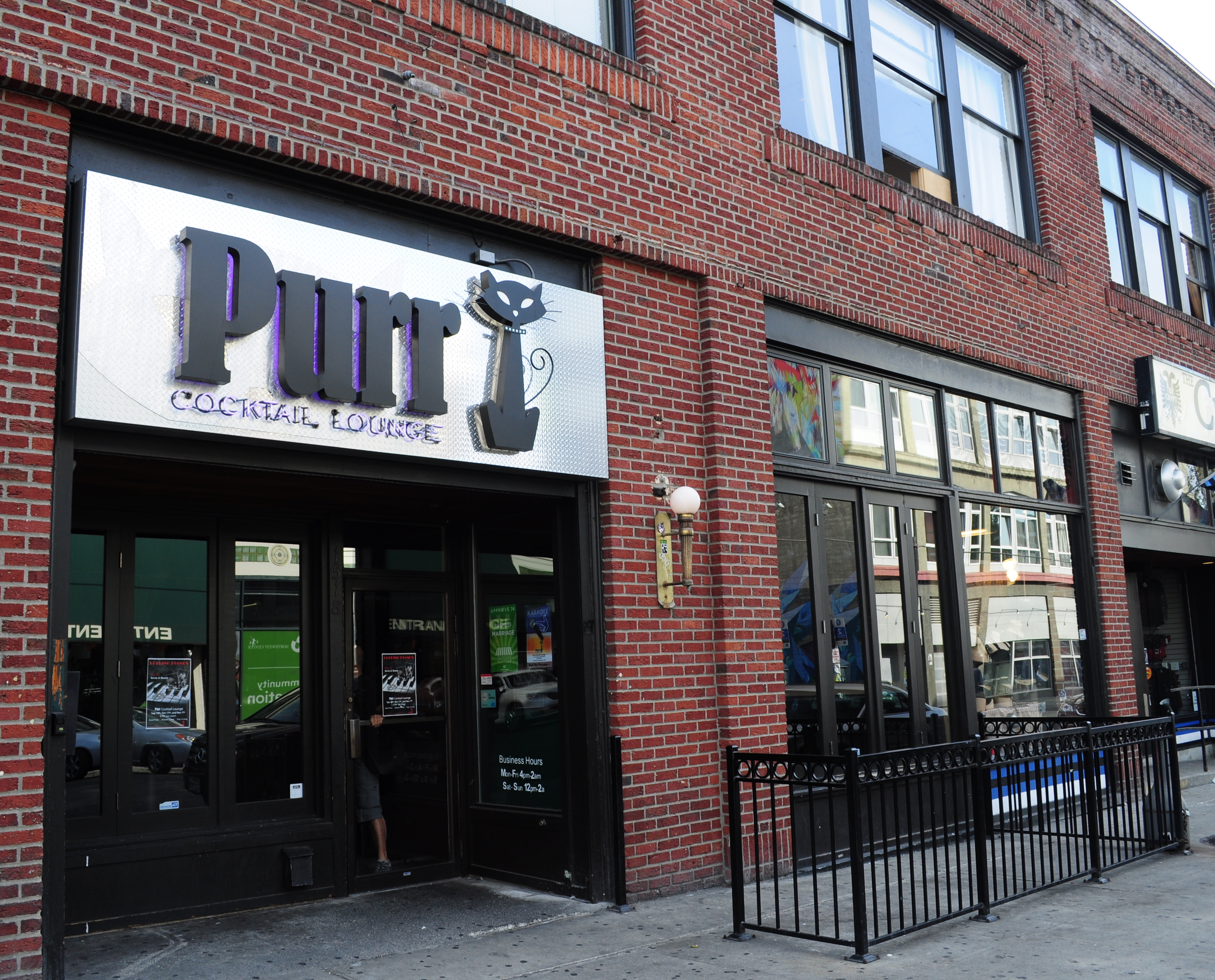
- The bar's exterior on Capitol Hill in 2012
- Interactive map of Purr Cocktail Lounge
- Address: 1518 11th Avenue (2005–2017); 2307 24th Avenue E (2017–2018); Seattle, Washington; United States
- Coordinates: 47.6148°N 122.3179°W
- Owner: Barbie Roberts
- Type: Gay bar; nightclub

Construction
- Opened: 2005
- Closed: 2018

Purr Cocktail Lounge was a gay bar and nightclub in Seattle, in the U.S. state of Washington. The video bar operated on Capitol Hill from 2005 to 2017, when it relocated to Montlake. Purr hosted events and activities ranging from drag shows and karaoke to viewing parties for elections and television shows. Magazines Out and Out Traveler included the venue in their lists of the world's 200 "greatest" gay bars. Purr closed in 2018, and the Capitol Hill space was later replaced by Queer Bar.

== Description ==
Purr Cocktail Lounge was a gay bar and nightclub in Seattle. The business initially operated on 11th Avenue between Pike Street and Pine Street on Capitol Hill, and later relocated to Montlake. In addition to cocktails, the video bar served Mexican food such as tacos, as well as burgers and beer. Purr's logo depicts a cartoon cat with a diamond or studded collar.

On Capitol Hill, the venue's interior had polished concrete floors, "high-end" red leather couches, exposed brick and timbers, purple lanterns, and a "massive, lovely" wooden bar, according to The Stranger's Bethany Jean Clement. Behind a "three-foot-high set of doors" was a cloakroom and staff changing area. A "VIP" lounge with a full bar, sound system, and two plasma displays was sometimes open to the public and was sometimes available to rent. In 2006, Clement said the patrons were approximately five percent women and that: "Purr's drinks are big and strong and served in heavy highball glasses that are narrower at the top than the bottom, seemingly designed to be dropped. The cute, tidy crowd is prone to hugging, smiling, and intermittent photo taking."

Out Traveler said: "Guaranteed to be packed every weekend is Purr, a magnet for the Aeropostale-Ben Sherman crowd with a super friendly staff. There's lots of space to sit or stand as you jam to the hottest tunes and watch music videos or a big game on 15 flatscreen TVs." Matt Baume of Bay Area Reporter called Purr "a little slice of West Hollywood with trendy outfits and slick video monitors".

== History ==
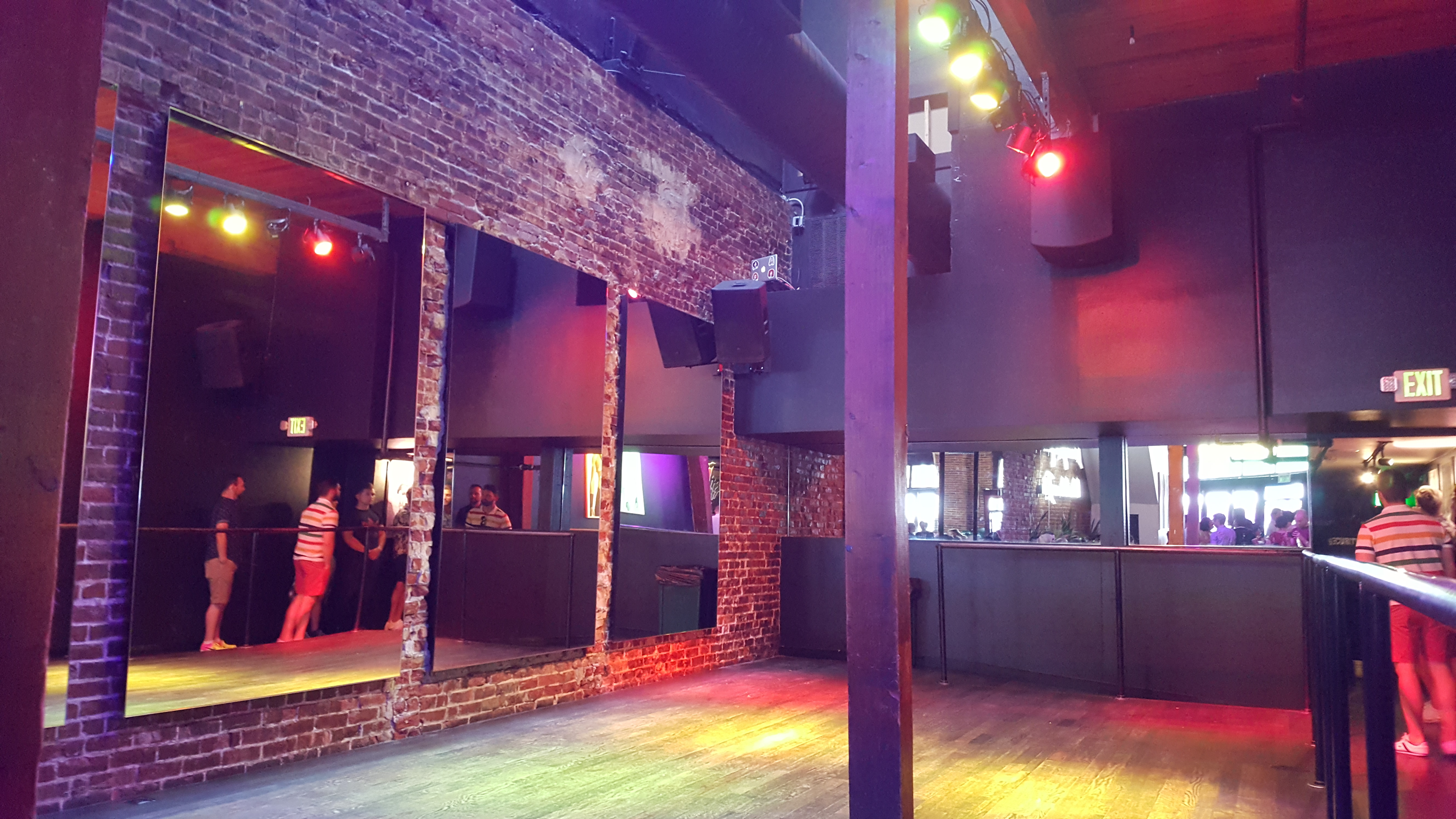
Interior of Queer Bar (pictured in 2018), which has occupied Purr Cocktail Lounge's former space on Capitol Hill since 2017

Purr's owner Barbie Roberts, a former employee of the video bar Manray, opened Purr in 2005 in a space that previously housed a bar named Bad Juju. Out Traveler described Roberts as "the hostess with the mostess and longtime supporter of the community, helping raise thousands of dollars annually for various LGBT charities and organizations".

In 2009, Purr was one of eleven gay bars in Seattle that received anonymous letters threatening ricin attacks. In response, Purr joined other businesses in organizing a pub crawl "to combat Hate and Fear". A press release for the event said, "All people are encouraged to support our efforts to bring life to our local bars for support against Fear and Hatred posed to our local Gay community."

Purr hosted events and activities, including karaoke on select weeknights from 2010 to 2016, an election viewing party in 2016, and a screening of the premiere episode of the television series Feud in 2017. Purr invited RuPaul's Drag Race contestants, including Raja in 2016, and Violet Chachki and Katya in 2017, to perform for Pride Month. The bar also held weekly Drag Race viewings with local drag performers, as of 2018, and monthly brunch meetings for Seattle Men in Leather, a gay social group within the leather subculture.

=== Relocation and closure ===
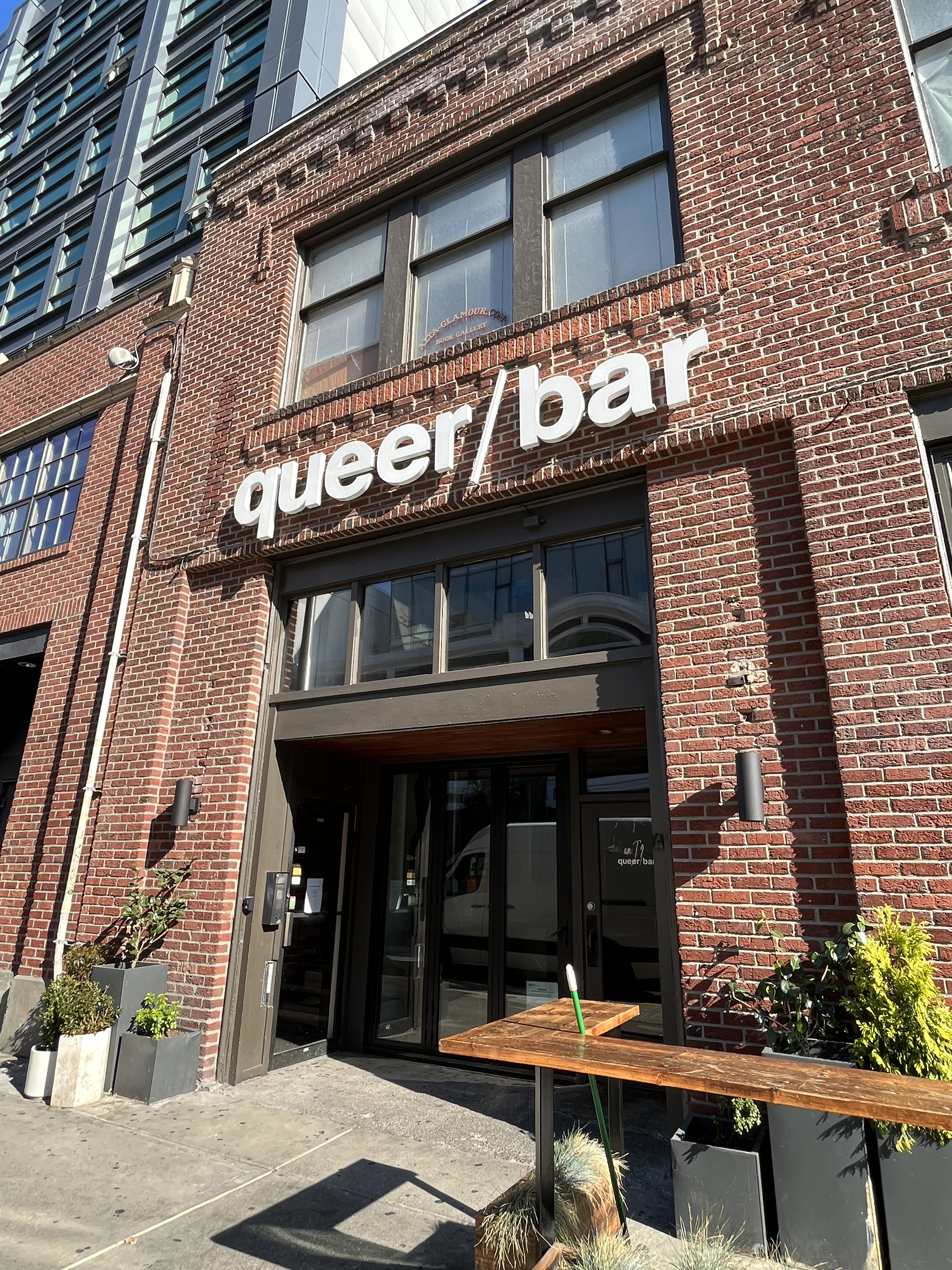
Exterior of Queer Bar (pictured in 2022), which opened in Purr Cocktail Lounge's Capitol Hill space after Purr relocated to the Montlake neighborhood in 2017

Purr operated on Capitol Hill for twelve years before relocating to Montlake in 2017. Roberts said the move was necessary because of high rent costs caused by gentrification. Queer Bar began operating in the Capitol Hill space in 2017. After relocating to Montlake, Purr closed within a year.

In 2018, Nathalie Graham of The Stranger wrote:

Purr Cocktail Lounge has a storied past. It was a bustling hub on Capitol Hill until it shuttered its doors last year and moved to Montlake. Naturally ... Purr is dead and the space on 24th Avenue East is vacant again. The Montlake queer community could be bustling, but not enough to revive Purr.

== Reception ==
In 2006, The Stranger's Bethany Jean Clement called Purr "the new Manray, meaning that it's the default, where you go to regroup if your night's not going as it should or to meet people before going to Neighbours [Nightclub]". In 2007, Out Traveler described Purr as Seattle's "most popular" gay bar and said: "The venue is nothing flashy and the layout of the service area makes it difficult to get a drink, but it's the bar where you're most likely to find the city's hottest boys, and they were in full force on Saturday night."

A list of the world's 200 "greatest" gay bars published by Out magazine in 2013 and Out Traveler in 2015 said Purr was "where the drinks are strong, the Whitney [Houston] is blaring, and the boys are waxed to a T. This Capital Hill cocktail lounge gets pretty cruisy on the weekends, but during the week the laid-back atmosphere makes it the perfect place to unwind after work." In a 2017 guide of Seattle, Attitude magazine's Nick Levine wrote, "If you fancy somewhere more mainstream, make a beeline for Purr Cocktail Lounge, a camp, poppy gay bar with a welcoming atmosphere. It's the sort of place where they'll restart the video screen if it starts skipping midway through Cher's 'Woman's World' (this happened while I was there)."

== See also ==
- List of incidents involving ricin
- List of LGBTQ bars
