= Harry Vanderbilt Wurdemann House =

Historic building in Washington, USA

- U.S. National Register of Historic Places
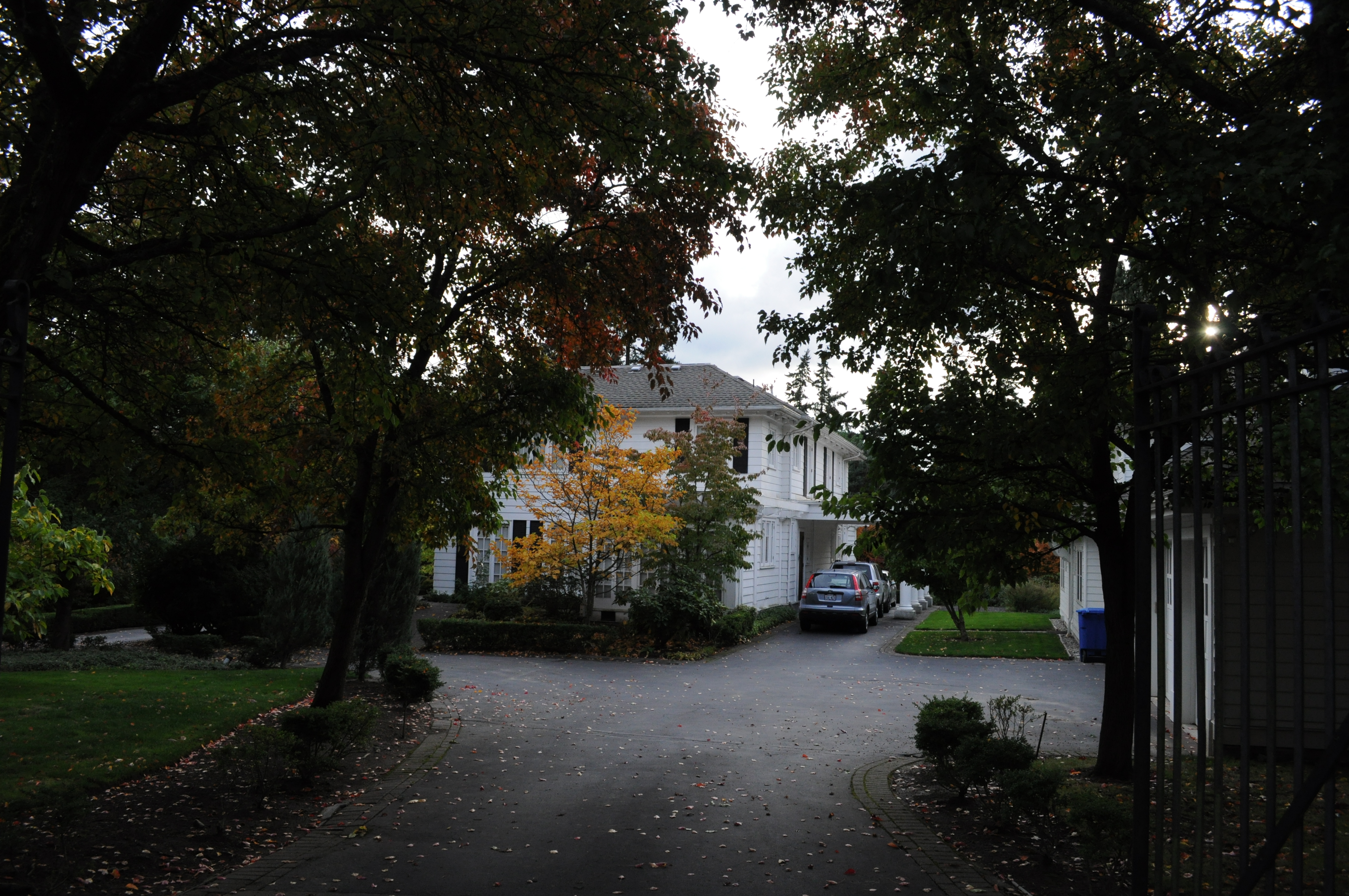
- Harry Vanderbilt Wurdemann House

- Location within Washington (state) Location within the United States
- Location: 17602 Bothell Way NE., Lake Forest Park, Washington
- Coordinates: 47°45′19″N 122°16′29″W
- Area: 2 acres (0.81 ha)
- Built: 1914
- Architectural style: Late 19th and 20th Century Revivals, Mediterranean Revival
- NRHP reference No.: 90002154
- Added to NRHP: December 27, 1990

The Harry Vanderbilt Wurdemann House, also known as the Wurdemann House, is a private home in Lake Forest Park, Washington. Built in 1914 and listed in the National Register of Historic Places in 1990, it was one of the first houses in Lake Forest Park.

== History ==
Wurdemann House is a two-story, four-bedroom, wood-frame structure on a concrete foundation, with 4,180 finished sf. Designed to be an architectural showpiece, the rectangular plan for the house was loosely based on a Mediterranean villa style. The house has two eight-pillared porticos. It sits on a knoll with a view of Lake Washington.

The property originally contained several outbuildings, including a large gardener's cottage/garage, a poultry house, boiler shed, and greenhouse. Wurdemann House was positioned at the entrance to Lake Forest Park, replacing a small real estate office that served the new planned community.

Built for Harry and May Wurdemann after they moved to Washington, the house was sold in 1924 to Adolf Linden, president of Puget Sound Savings and Loan Association. Linden added a pool and brick-and-iron fence to the property. Subsequent owners included Roy L. Maryatt, owner of Maryatt Electrical Laundry Company and American Linen Supply; Walter Brown, a local railroad owner; John Clancy, a saloon owner; Mrs. True Uncaphor, owner of the Sun Life Insurance Company; and Arie Vanderspeck, international banker and consul for the Netherlands.

== Recent changes ==
After being unoccupied for some years, the property was purchased by a development company in 1990. A portion of the property was sought by a firm with plans to build a 55-unit retirement facility, but the local Planning Commission recommended denial of the application for variance due to widespread opposition from the public.

Entrance to the property has changed from a wide, circular drive from the southeast to a small street from the north.

In 1990, the mansion was leased by the Seattle Symphony for several months to raise funds through entrance fees. In 2014, private tours were offered to benefit the Shoreline Historical Museum & Heritage Center.
