= Town Center at Lake Forest Park =

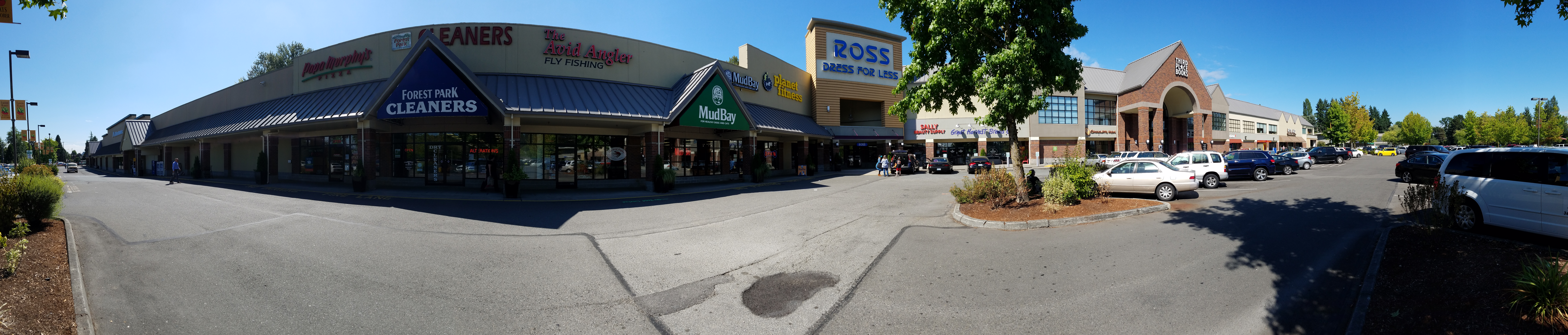
- Panoramic view, 2017
- Location: Lake Forest Park, Washington, U.S.
- Coordinates: 47°45′15″N 122°16′47″W
- Address: 17171 NE Bothell Way
- Opened: October 7, 1964
- Renovated: 1988–1989
- Previous names: Forest Park Shopping Center, Lake Forest Park Towne Center
- Developer: Farwest Properties
- Owner: Merlone Geier Partners
- Floor area: 250,130 square feet (23,238 m^{2})
- Floors: 2
- Website: towncenteratlakeforest.com

Town Center at Lake Forest Park (formerly Lake Forest Park Towne Centre) is a shopping center that also serves as the community hub for the city of Lake Forest Park, Washington. It is located on the eastern side of Lake Forest Park, on the western shore of Lake Washington in a suburb of Seattle on Bothell Way NE beside City Hall. The southeast side of the center abuts the Burke-Gilman Trail.

Town Center at Lake Forest Park is anchored by Third Place Books, Safeway, Ross Dress for Less, and Planet Fitness and features almost 250,000 square feet (23,000 m^{2}) of gross leasable area on 18 acres. Third Place Books, a general interest bookseller offering more than 200,000 new, used, and bargain books, occupies a large portion of the mall and is adjacent to a food court. Third Place Commons, a community-supported non-profit, manages a large and flexible space next to the bookstore and hosts community groups and hundreds of free events each year. On the stage, the Commons welcomes author events, music and dance recitals, town halls, and sponsors free live music every Friday and Saturday night.

Each Sunday from 10am - 2pm, starting in May and ending in October, the Third Place Commons Farmers Market is held in the lower parking lot of Town Center near City Hall.

== History ==
The Forest Park Shopping Center opened on October 7, 1964, with 200,000 square feet (19,000 m^{2}) of retail space across two levels. Major tenants at that time included Rhodes Brothers, Pay 'n Save, and Albertsons. The shopping center was developed by Farwest Properties, an Olympia-based company, at a cost of $3 million, on 20 acres (8.1 ha) of land at the corner of State Route 522 and State Route 104. Lake Forest Park was an unincorporated community at the time but pursued cityhood in response to the mall's construction to prevent further commercial development. A branch of the King County Library System opened at the mall in 1974 using space leased by the city government.

A renovation and expansion was approved by the city government in 1987 with an exemption to the municipal height limit. Construction began the following year but was delayed by three months following the discovery of unexpected issues with the existing structure. It was renamed the Lake Forest Park Towne Center and reopened in September 1989 after it had been expanded to 243,500 square feet (22,620 m^{2}) with 49 stores; Albertsons also announced plans to expand their store. Several vacant retail spaces on the second floor were later replaced by Third Place Books, a bookstore with a food court and community stage that opened in 1998.

The mall was acquired by Madison Marquette in July 2006 and later renamed to the Town Center at Lake Forest Park. A smaller renovation was completed in 2011 and included the addition of a Ross Dress for Less and a Planet Fitness. The mall was sold to Merlone Geier Partners in 2014 for $37 million and sold to DLC Management in 2025 for $28 million.
