= LGBTQ culture in Vancouver =

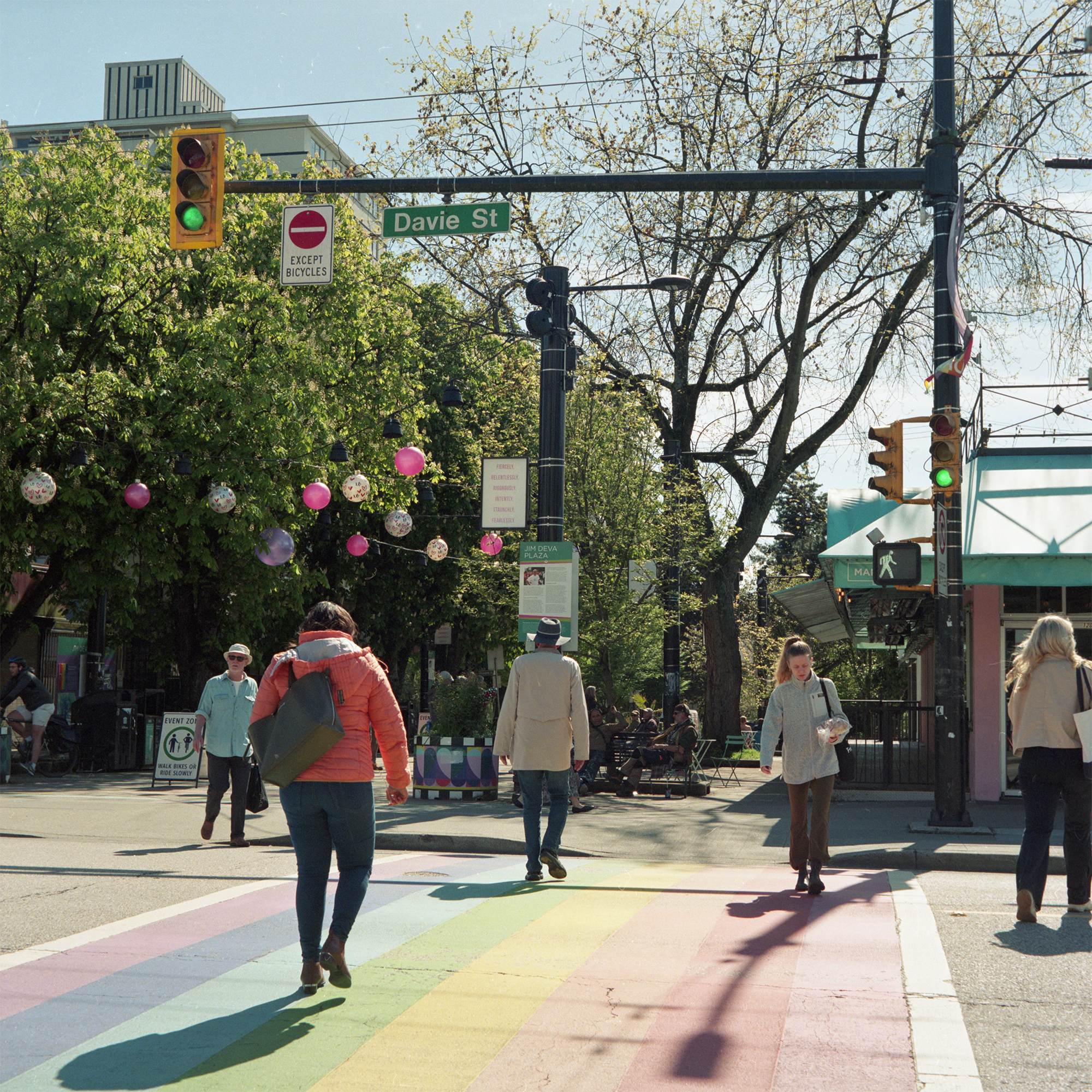
Rainbow crosswalk in Davie Village

Vancouver's (British Columbia, Canada) LGBTQ community is centered on Davie Village. In the past Commercial Drive has acted as a gayborhood for the Vancouver lesbian community. Historically, LGBTQ people have also gathered in the Chinatown and Gastown neighborhoods. Former establishments include The Castle Pub, Vanport Pub, and BJ's Drag Club.

In 2021 a CBC article described Vancouver as "a safe haven for LGBTQ people from around the world". Condé Nast Traveler called Vancouver "Canada's most gay-friendly city".

== Community centres ==
ASK (the Association for Social Knowledge) was a grassroots LGBTQ organization that began as a newsletter publisher, community support group, and networking group. Its newsletters were published between 1964 and 1968. On New Years Eve 1966 ASK inaugurated Vancouver’s first LGBTQ community centre with a ball. Located at 1929 Kingsway st, the centre’s doors officially opened in February 1967 as a mixed gay and lesbian organization.

The ASK centre stayed at 1929 Kingsway st for a year, after which the landlord would not renew the lease. It then moved to a rundown ex-bowling alley-warehouse at 1268 East Hastings st. The centre eventually moved to the Kitsilano Theatre at 2114 W 4th Avenue where, according Liz Millward, it experienced financial problems. Nonetheless, the ASK centre hosted successful gatherings there. Doug Sanders, a former ASK president, recalled hosting Saturday night dances for over 200 guests. 2114 W 4th would be converted to a “commercial venue” by Norma Mitchell, ASK’s president at the time.

Qmunity, founded in 1979 as the Vancouver Gay Community Centre and formerly known as "The Centre", is on the corner of Bute & Davie Street. The organization is planning to open a new 17-storey community center in spring 2027.

On September 5th 1985 the Vancouver Lesbian Centre opened at 876 Commercial Dr. within the city's lesbian gay village. The centre was established by Vancouver Lesbian Connection (VLC). They envisioned a political and social space that was as economically self-sufficient and not entirely dependent on government funding. The centre offered a space to socialize, maintained a library, displayed local art, and updated an information board for events and services. They held a range of weekly activities like coffeehouses, mother and children drop-ins, legal advice clinics, and VLC meetings. The Centre hosted a phone hotline, called the Lesbian Information Line, that allowed women to anonymously connect with staff and volunteers for resources and information.

== Events ==
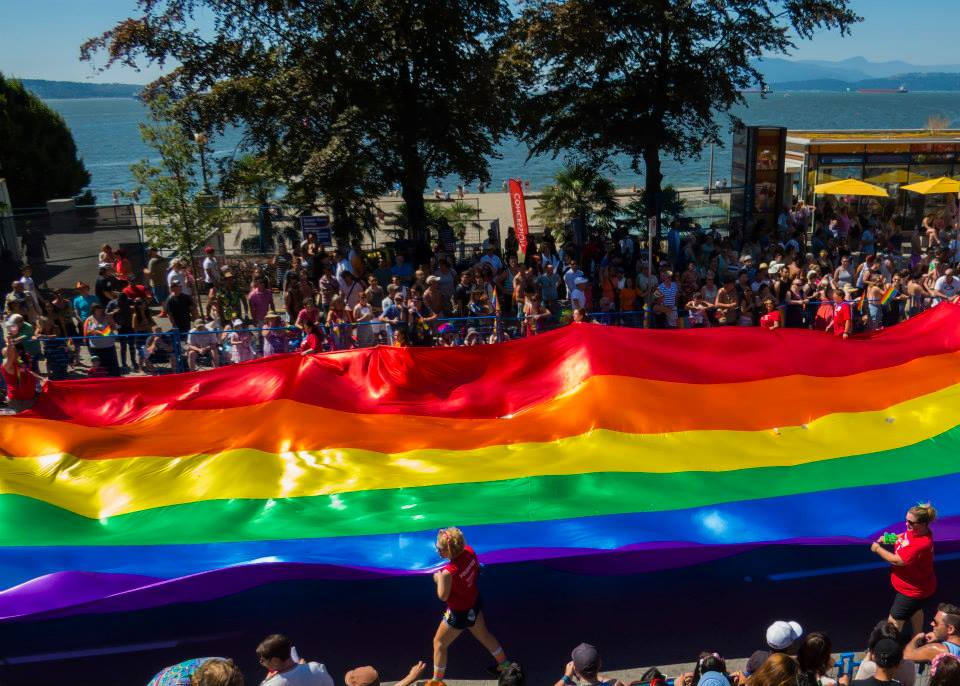
Vancouver pride parade, 2014

LGBTQ events in Vancouver include:

- Pride Week 1973
- Queer Arts Festival
- Vancouver Pride Festival, annual LGBTQ+ pride event
- Vancouver Queer Film Festival

The annual Gay Men's Health Summit is hosted by Vancouver's Community-Based Research Centre for Gay Men's Health (CBRC).

The Really Gay History walking tour spotlights LGBTQ+ history throughout Vancouver. It showcases neighborhoods, churches, and businesses that are connected to local LGBTQ+ history and culture.

== Media ==
=== Print ===
The ASK Newsletter was a grassroots publication that produced 30 monthly newsletters between July 1964 and February 1968. According to former ASK president Douglas Sanders, the newsletter was modeled after the Mattachine Society of San Francisco.

Press Gang Publishers was a printing collective that platformed LGBTQ women in Vancouver between 1974 and 2002.

Angles is an LGBTQ focused newspaper that was originally published between 1983 - 1998 in Vancouver. Its precursor was a newsletter for the Vancouver Gay Community Centre (now Qmunity) created in 1979. Angles was largely produced by volunteers. According to Alex Spence in their Angles and VGCC News index, “Angles presented a wide range... of coverage in its issues”. Everything from local and international news, a monthly Vancouver events calendar, cartoons, to a vast array of articles on local LGBTQ sporting groups. According to Spence “[by] 1996 Angles claimed 36,000 readers a month…” across Canada. Spence points to the increase in competition brought in by Xtra! West’s launch in 1993 that eventually caused Angles to close. Specifically, that there was a migration of advertisers from Angles to Xtra!, decreasing advertising revenue that Angles needed to maintain operations. In October 2024 Qmunity relaunched Angles as a digital publication.

Xtra Vancouver was a gay bi-weekly newspaper, published by Pink Triangle Press between 1993 and 2015. In 2015 Xtra also halted publication of its Ottawa and Toronto print papers, consolidating its resources to focus on digital media as Xtra Magazine.

=== Television ===
In the 1980s Gayblevision, a TV program produced in Vancouver's West End, documented and shared local LGBTQ culture. It was one of Canada's first LGBTQ focused TV shows. The VIVO Media Arts Centre archived their footage in the 2010s.

OUTtv is a specialty channel and streaming network headquartered in Vancouver that has been covering local LGBTQ events and culture since 2001.

== Bars and nightclubs ==
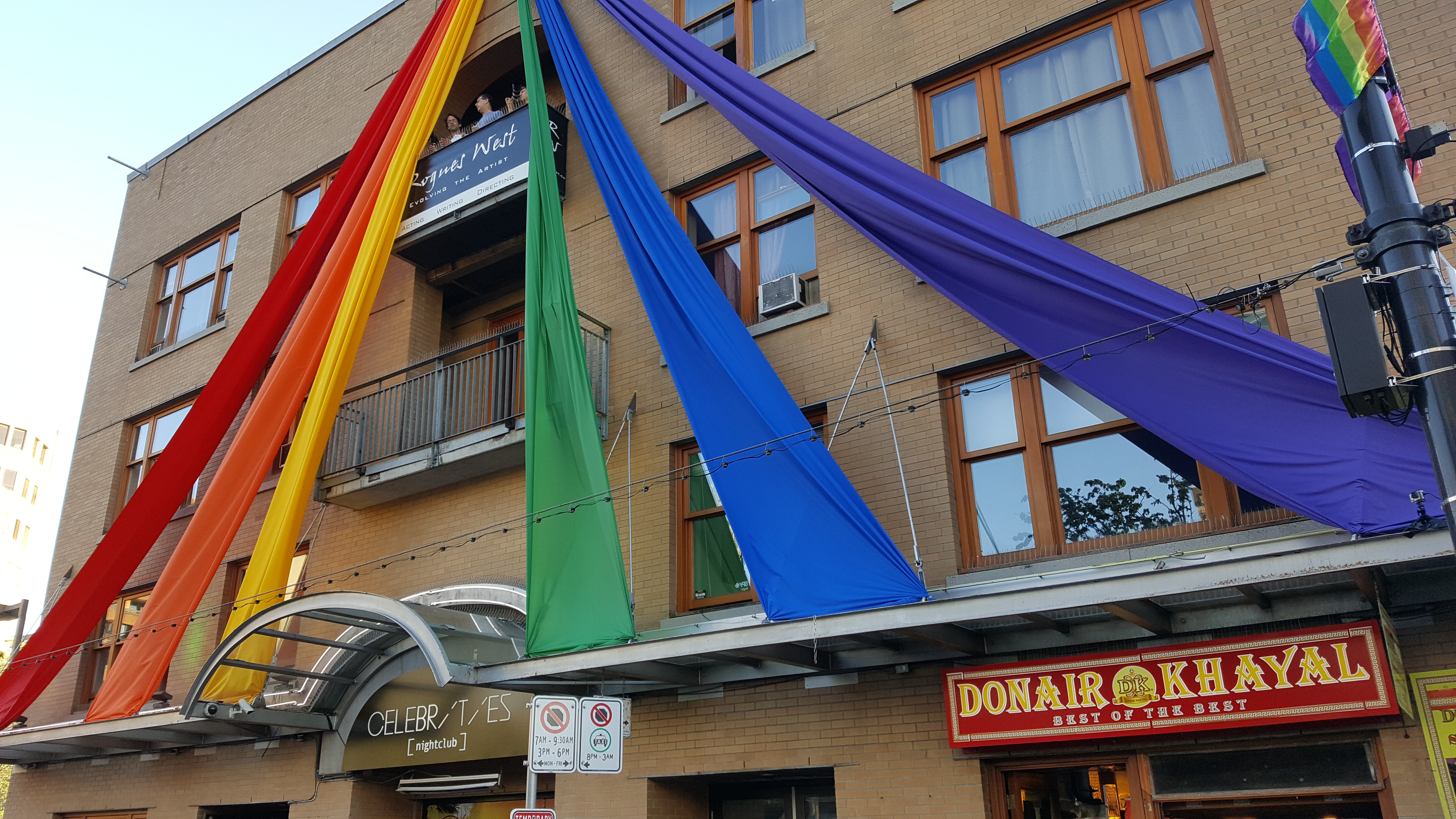
Celebrities Nightclub's exterior, 2016

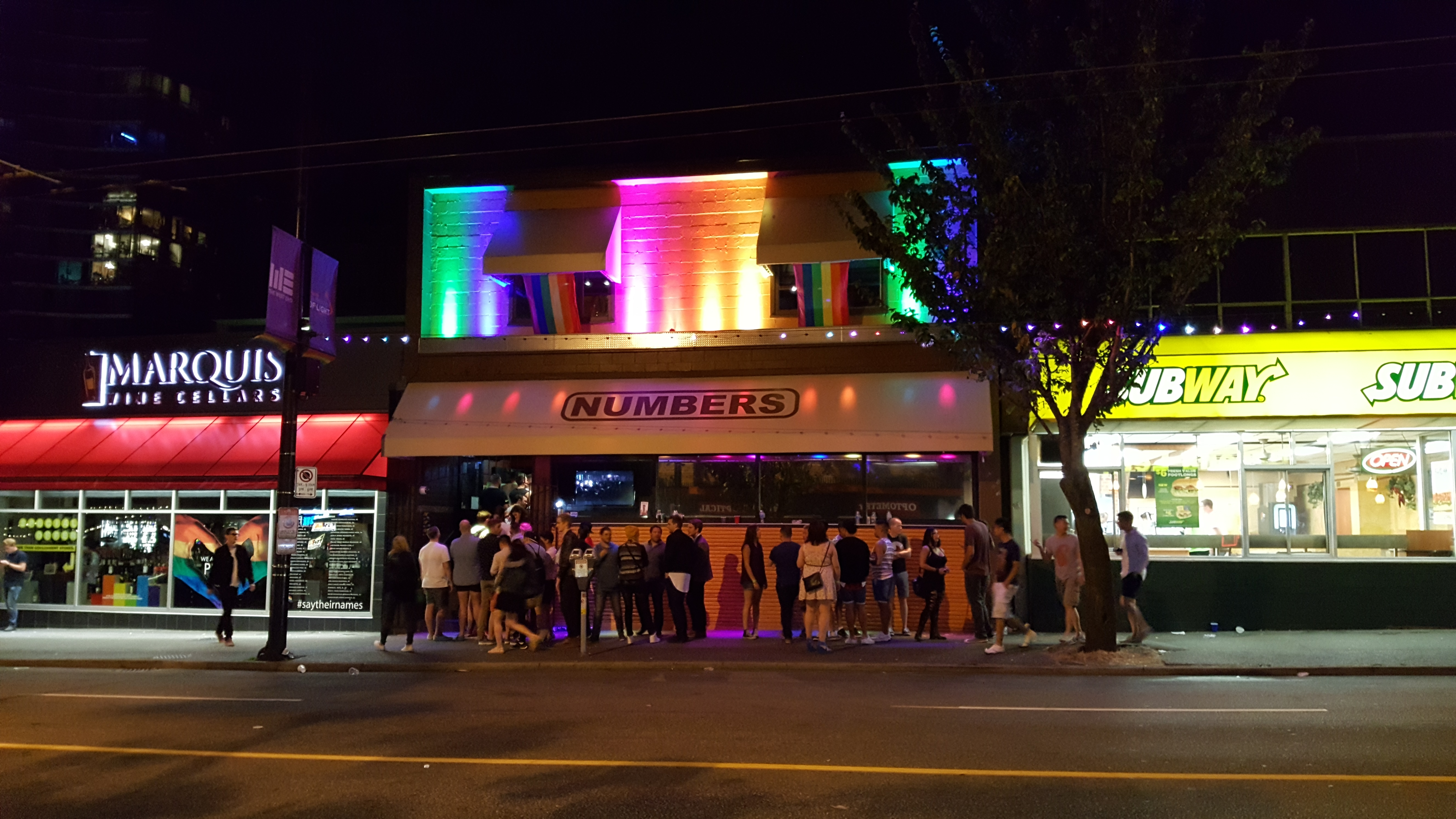
Exterior of Numbers, 2016

=== Present-day ===
LGBTQ bars and nightclubs in Vancouver include Celebrities Nightclub, Fountainhead Pub, The Junction, and Numbers, and Pumpjack Pub.

=== Historic ===
The Castle Pub, at 750 Granville St, was a beer parlour located in The Castle Hotel. The hotel was built in 1908 and its beer parlour opened in 1922. The parlour was gender segregated and became a popular venue for LGBTQ people to meet and socialize. Bobby Fraser, a bartender who worked at the parlour in the 1980s, claimed to have met tourists who “remembered that [The Castle] is where men go to meet men” in the 1930s. In the early 1970s The Castle was the location of a "kiss-in" protest, led by members of the GLF, against bar management rules that prohibited touching or kissing among LGBTQ patrons. The Castle closed in 1990 and was demolished soon after.

The Vanport Pub, at 645 Main St, was a hub of lesbian culture from the 1960s to 1975. It served a large demographic and had a reputation for being dangerous.

BJ's Drag Club, at 339 Pender St, was a community nightlife space that opened December 1970. it frequently hosted Drag shows. It served a diverse crowd in the LGBTQ community, not being a dedicated gay or lesbian space. It was named after its owners, Brian and Jim. Shows were mainly produced by Jim Wolf and two regular performers, Eleanor and Mona Lee. The owners kept a large costume collection alongside their offices on the upper floors of the building. The club closed January 1983 when Bill and Jim retired. After it was sold, it briefly became a western themed bar known as Saddle Tramps, later becoming a lesbian bar called Ms. T's. Ms. T's burned down in July 2003.

== Organizations ==
LGBTQ organizations based in Vancouver include:

- AIDS Vancouver
- BC Gay and Lesbian Archives
- Dancing to Eagle Spirit Society
- The Dogwood Monarchist Society (DMS)
- Frank Theatre Company
- Gay Alliance Toward Equality
- Greater Vancouver Native Cultural Society (GVNCS Two-Spirit Society)
- Health Initiative for Men (HiM)
- Kiss and Tell collective
- Little Sister's Book and Art Emporium
- Our City of Colours
- Pinoy Pride Vancouver
- Q Hall of Fame Canada
- Rainbow Refugee
- Salaam Vancouver
- Sher Vancouver
- Trikone Vancouver
- Vancouver Gay Liberation Front
- Vancouver Pride Society
- West End Slo-pitch Association
- Yad b’Yad LGBTQ
- Zee Zee Theatre
