= Liliget Feast House =

Former restaurant in Vancouver, Canada

Liliget Feast House and Catering
- Interactive map of Liliget Feast House and Catering

Restaurant information
- Established: 1995
- Closed: 2007
- Owner: Dolly Watts
- Food type: Indigenous
- Location: 1724 Davie Street, Vancouver, Canada
- Coordinates: 49°17′11″N 123°08′27″W
- Seating capacity: 52
- Website: www.liliget.com

Liliget Feast House and Catering was a restaurant in the West End neighbourhood of Vancouver, British Columbia, that specialized in Pacific Northwest Indigenous cuisine. Owned and operated by Dolly Watts beginning in 1995, Liliget Feast House closed down in 2007, after 12 years of operation.

Liliget succeeded Muckamuck Restaurant and Quilicum, Indigenous restaurants which both occupied the 1724 Davie Street location that Liliget was in. Identified as among the first restaurants that featured the cuisine of the Indigenous communities of the Pacific Northwest, historians Tabitha Robin, Mary Kate Dennis, and Michael Anthony Hart listed Liliget Feast House, among others, as part of the legacy of restaurants within the Canadian Indigenous culinary experience.

== Description ==
Liliget Feast House's name is derived from the Gitxsan language term "liliget" meaning "where people feast", or "the place the people come to feast."

The interior of the restaurant was inspired by that of a traditional Northwest Coast longhouse, the longhouse space was designed by architect Arthur Erickson. The restaurant space was formerly occupied by the Muckamuck Restaurant situated on 1724 Davie Street, which closed in 1981 due to a labour dispute between the non-Indigenous owners and the Indigenous staff. The Muckamuck Restaurant was succeeded by Quilicum in 1986, which was run by the former Muckamuck staff, but would close down in 1995 before being taken up by Liliget Feast House.

The awning of the restaurant featured Watts' family crest featuring a white owl. The restaurant offered seating for 52 individuals, with seating arranged on raised gravel beds. The restaurant's interior contained wooden walkways, beach pebble floors, a system of staircases, cedar-plank tables with sunken legroom, tatami-style benches, and mat seating. Buffed wooden pillars 2 feet (0.61 m) thick separated the restaurant into sections. The tables were made so that the wooden slabs had to be lifted in order for patrons to climb into the seats. Within the restaurant, the lighting was low due to the lack of windows. The interior featured contemporary First Nations art and Haida prints on the walls, for ambience, the restaurant played "laughing water", pan flute music, and chants. Per Schellhaas, due to occupying the same space as the preceding restaurants, Liliget only differed by the artworks featured in its interior design.

Food served at Liliget Feast House was typically wild game and seafood prepared in a style by Watts' design. The most popular dishes the restaurant was known for were the salmon and seafood platters, samplings inspired by food served during the potlatch, with Watts expressing her pride in the wild arctic caribou. A 1996 feature by The New York Times highlighted the "unusual choices" including wind-dried salmon and pan-fried oolichan. Food was grilled over fire with alder wood as fuel, akin to the food prepared in a traditional manner in the Gitxsan villages Watts grew up in. During the summer, the restaurant served the "traditional favourites" lunch hour with a buffalo burger. Dessert served at the restaurant featured few Indigenous options, with the exception of Yel'iss, a mousse made from soopalalie. According to Andrew George Jr., there was significant continuity between the menu between Liliget, Muckamuck, and Quilicum. Despite this, there were unique offerings such as cheddar cheese perogies, crab cakes, clam fritters, stuffed jalapenos with cream cheese, and sweet potato tarts. Food was served on long wooden bowls made from carved cedar and alder, some dishes were served on decorative "canoes".

== History ==
Liliget Feast House was owned by Dolly Watts, a member of the Gitxsan people who was born 1935 in Kitwanga, British Columbia. Liliget Feast House was preceded by Grandma's Bannock, a small stand outside of the Museum of Anthropology at UBC which was run by Watts while she attended the University of British Columbia. She recalled that when students wanted to raise funds for a trip, Watts offered to make bannock which she would sell for a dollar each. After five days, she sold 1,500 individual bannock. Watts' bannock business would eventually become Just Like Grandma's Bannock Catering in 1992. The bannock business initially ran from rented kitchens, such as the ones in Granville Island Public Market. As demand began to rise, Watts was made aware of the Davie Street location.

Liliget Feast House was formally founded in 1995. A restaurant space opened up between Deman and Davie streets which was previously owned by a friend of Watts. Watts was initially hesitant about opening a restaurant in the space, but eventually decided to do so after six months, opening Liliget Feast House late August that year. The restaurant was an initial success, with a peak in business in 1997.

The restaurant faced financial difficulties in the years following 1997 due to economic difficulties. Watts speaking to Windspeaker stated business has "gone down since. We can't seem to surpass the $400,000 line since '97". The Windspeaker interview noted that Watts struggled with the high cost of advertising the restaurant. The majority of the clientele at Liliget consisted of tourists, with Watts noting in her acceptance speech for the BC Achievement Indigenous Business Award in 2010 that "we hardly ever served First Nations". Schellhaas noted that due to the fact that ordering dishes that Indigenous clients could eat for free at various gatherings and of a style that was unaccustomed to the taste for foods accustomed for home-style preparations, visiting Liliget would be too expensive.

In 2007, after 12 years of operation, the restaurant closed down. The entire building was sold in order to make way for a condominium development. Following the restaurant's closure, Watts, along with her daughter Annie, published Where People Feast: An Indigenous People's Cookbook. Where People Feast documented the recipes that were prepared at Liliget, recorded on index cards by Watts. The complex where Liliget was located was ultimately demolished in 2008.

== Reception ==
For her work in Liliget Feast House, Dolly Watts was the recipient of the 2001 Indspire Award in the field of Business and Commerce. Watts received an award from the British Columbia Achievement Foundation, then the BC Aboriginal Business Awards, in 2010 for her overall work within the restaurant sector and her activities afterwards.

The New York Times gave the restaurant four out of five stars, stating that it offered "the best Aboriginal food in North America". It was among the restaurants highlighted in the Fodor's Choice column by Fodor's, noting "one of the few places in the world serving the original Northwest Coast First Nations cuisine". Ulysses Travel Guides' Western Canada and Vancouver and Victoria books stated Liliget Feast House was a "unique dining experience and quiet evening out". Peter Greenberg in his Travel Detective Flight Crew Confidential described Liliget as an "American Indian restaurant like no other". Michael Colombara writing in Langara College's Pacific Rim Magazine stated Liliget delivered a "stimulating dining experience" noting that the "chef has done well".

=== Legacy ===
In ...mmm Manitoba, historians Tabitha Robin, Mary Kate Dennis, and Michael Anthony Hart listed Liliget Feast House, along with La Toundra, the restaurant within the Canadian Pavilion at Expo '67, as part of the legacy of Indigenous restaurants within the Canadian Indigenous culinary experience. Sebastian Schellhaas' First Nations Cuisines - Wandel und Professionalisierung indigener Ernährungskulturen in British Columbia, Kanada stated that "it cannot be denied that Liliget, like its predecessors, significantly expanded the culinary spectrum of Vancouver while maintaining the presence of Indigenous food cultures in the public space".

Gabby Peyton in her Where We Ate: A Field Guide to Canada's Restaurants, Past and Present identified Liliget as "the first First Nations restaurant in North America". Jamaias DaCosta writing for CBC News stated it was "the only First Nations fine dining establishment of its kind". The Globe and Mail identified Liliget as one of the first Indigenous restaurants.

== See also ==
- ʔálʔal Café, another Indigenous-owned restaurant, in Seattle, Washington
- Indigenous cuisine of the Americas
- Salmon n' Bannock, Liliget's informal successor
