= Salmon n' Bannock =

Restaurant in Vancouver, Canada

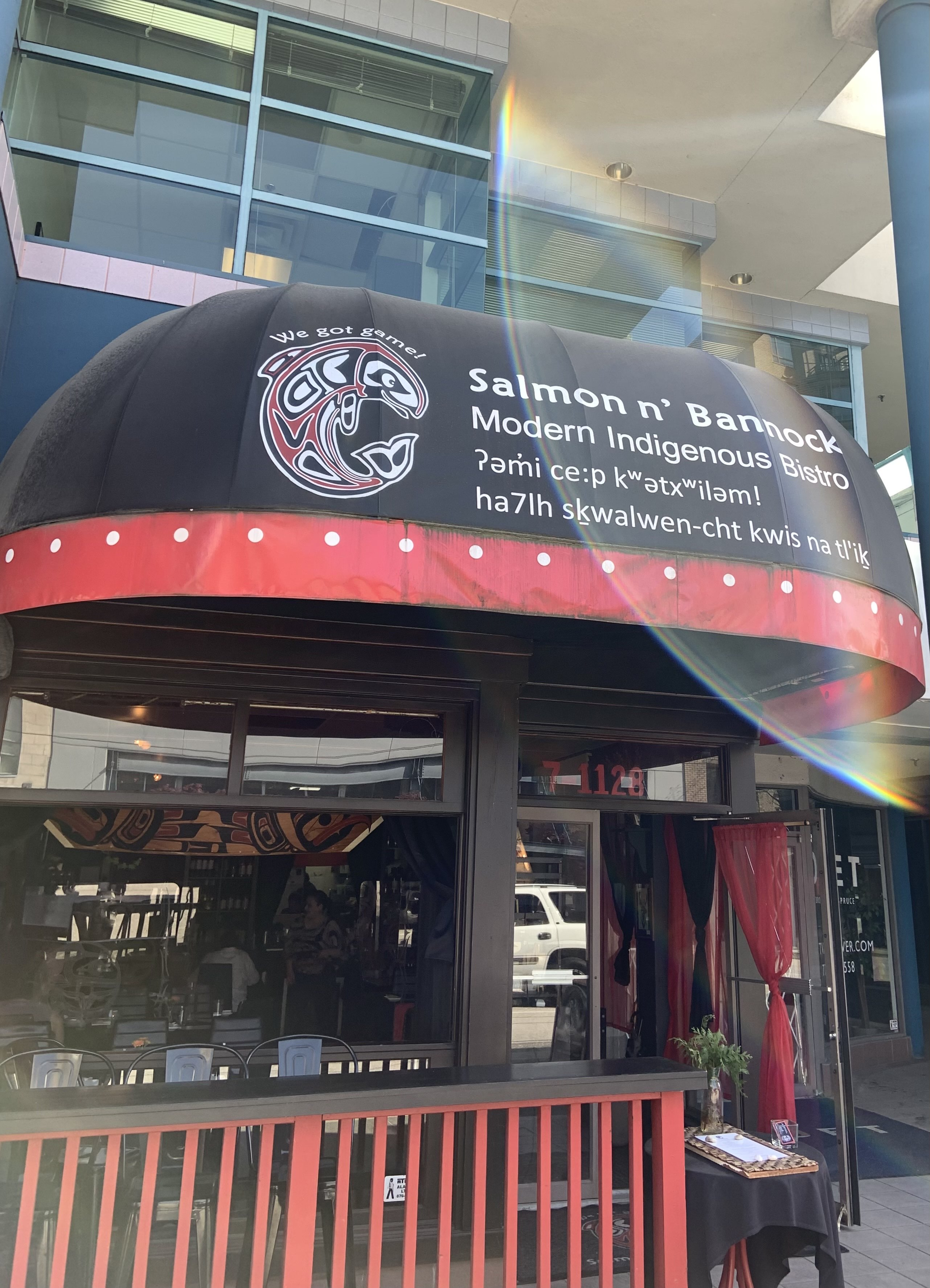
- The restaurant's exterior, 2023
- Interactive map of Salmon n' Bannock

Restaurant information
- Established: 2010
- Owners: Inez Cook; Remi Caudron (former co-owner with Cook)
- Food type: Indigenous
- Location: 7-1128 West Broadway, Vancouver, Canada
- Coordinates: 49.2633°N 123.1298°W
- Website: www.salmonandbannock.net

Salmon n' Bannock (Note: Some sources refer to the restaurant as Salmon n' Bannock Bistro. The official name per the website is "Salmon n' Bannock") is a restaurant in the Fairview neighbourhood in Vancouver, British Columbia, Canada, situated on the Broadway thoroughfare. First opening in 2010, it expanded in 2022 to a second location in the Vancouver International Airport dubbed Salmon n' Bannock On The Fly. The restaurant exclusively serves Indigenous Canadian cuisine, advertising itself as the sole Indigenous restaurant in Vancouver.

== Description ==
Salmon n' Bannock's name was devised with First Nations customers familiar with bannock in mind, while including salmon for the benefit of non-Indigenous patrons unfamiliar with the Indigenous American dish. Salmon n' Bannock was intended as a modern Indigenous bistro inspired by Inez Cook's culture and travels. Cook's intention in creating the restaurant was as an act towards her conception of "reconcili-action".

Both locations feature artwork by Indigenous artists as part of their interior design. The interior of the Broadway location is primarily red and black in colour, with a painted canoe suspended from the restaurant's ceiling and artwork by patrons on the walls, which is available for purchase. Business is primarily through reservation, rather than foot traffic, with parking available behind the complex. Construction from the Broadway Subway Project is said to impact the restaurant minimally because of the reservation system.

Food served at the restaurant prioritizes sourcing from Indigenous-owned businesses, then outwards to local, Canadian, and outwards to suppliers from Turtle Island (North America). Wild fish served at the restaurant is brought there daily by First Nations fishermen. Bison and venison is provided to the restaurant by Hills Foods Limited, but due to the restrictions on the sale of wild game, moose meat is not sold. Wines are provided by Nk'Mip Cellars, a First Nations–owned Okanagan winery.

Inez Cook states that the restaurant features "100 percent First Nations food, and it's staffed entirely by native people." The restaurant's all-Indigenous staff was a way for the restaurant to show that Indigenous cultures are "alive". In 2022, the restaurant included 24 individual staff members representing 18 separate First Nations. Cook researched traditional cuisine preparation and ingredients prior to the restaurant's founding, hiring local Indigenous people to create the menu due to Cook's removal from her culture as a Sixties Scoop survivor. Dishes served at Salmon n' Bannock take traditional ingredients prepared in an alternative fashion, or reinvent a traditional First Nations recipe altogether. Dishes served in the restaurant primarily feature meat and fish-based dishes. Meat served at the restaurant include bison, boar, caribou, elk, musk ox, oolichan, and salmon. Seal meat was considered for the menu, but was ultimately decided against due to the lack of Inuit staff and death threats to other restaurants who served the meat. Ingredients include birch syrup, blueberries, cedar jelly, fiddleheads, huckleberries, Iroquois corn, maple syrup, salal berries, saskatoon berries, sea asparagus, soapberries, stinging nettle, and wild rice. Cedar jelly is provided by suppliers based on the east coast, as cedars native to the west coast contain a neurotoxin.

== History ==
Salmon n' Bannock was founded by Inez Cook and Remi Caudron in 2010. (Note: Caudron's surname has been referred to as Remi Cook in some sources.) Cook was a former flight attendant, a member of the Nuxalk Nation, and a survivor of the Sixties Scoop. Through her work at Salmon n' Bannock, Cook was able to reconnect with her extended family in the Nuxalk Nation. Cook gained sole ownership of the restaurant in 2019, after buying out Caudron.

The restaurant was established in 2010, coinciding with the 2010 Winter Olympics coming to Vancouver. Cook stated that it "was a chance to introduce the world to the authentic Indigenous flavors that had been missing in Vancouver." Despite the placement, business was initially sparse due to the roads being blocked off during Olympic festivities. In addition, the restaurant was established to provide a gathering place for local Indigenous communities with a focus on people and food. Cook was inspired to open the restaurant after coming across Kelowna's Kekuli Cafe, noting Vancouver did not have any restaurant that served Indigenous cuisine. It became the sole Indigenous restaurant in Vancouver following the closure of Liliget Feast House in 2007. (Note: Stainsby lists the closure of Liliget Feast House in 2006, per Schellhaas, it closed in 2007.)

Salmon n' Bannock was a participant of the Indigenous feast box initiative by the Indigenous Culinary of Associated Nations, distributing the food boxes to Indigenous families in need. In 2022, as part of Vancouver's Dine Out Festival, Salmon n' Bannock featured Inuk chef Sheila Flaherty. The restaurant expanded to include a food delivery menu on Uber Eats amid the COVID-19 pandemic in British Columbia, responding to dining restrictions on restaurants. It began a fundraising campaign in 2022 entitled "Feed Your Spirit" in collaboration with Helping Spirit Lodge Society and RainCity Housing in order to raise costs to complete the construction of the second location and cover costs of staff training.

On December 19, 2022, Salmon n' Bannock expanded to a second location situated in the Vancouver International Airport, dubbed Salmon n' Bannock On The Fly. When it opened, it became the first Indigenous restaurant in a Canadian airport. Cook was initially approached by planners from the airport in 2018. Due to her schedule she initially declined the offer, but eventually agreed to their suggestion.

== Reception ==
Reception to Salmon n' Bannock's cuisine has been generally positive, with Inez Cook remarking "we've been in The New York Times, The Guardian, San Francisco Chronicle, Der Spiegel, inflight magazines, Japanese magazines, been on Trip Advisor's [sic] Vancouver Top 10 list for six years, and PBS's Samantha Brown's Places to Love." (Note: Verifiable sources on the previous statement: NYT; The Guardian; San Francisco Chronicle (SFGATE); Der Spiegel; Samantha Brown's Places to Love)

Actress Jane Fonda wrote on her website that "the food, all Indigenous recipes, fresh and local, was delicious" with Inez Cook describing that Fonda "went crazy for the smoked oolichan." Samantha Brown in her Samantha Brown's Places to Love series described it positively, stating the bistro "teems with charm, and the food is outstanding".

The New York Times recommended Salmon n' Bannock in its "The Athletic's NHL Food and Drink Travel Guide", with writer Corey Masisak stating that it was "the most unique menu he's ever seen" and "among the five best dinners he's had while travelling for work." Salmon n' Bannock was listed on the Daily Hive's "11 places to learn about Indigenous culture in Metro Vancouver" list. Mia Stainsby included it on her "4 must-try dining hotspots in Metro Vancouver" list. CNN featured the restaurant in its 2018 feature entitled "Get game: Vancouver's Indigenous cuisine." Salmon n' Bannock was among those featured in Lonely Planet's "8 essential Vancouver experiences to add to your itinerary", and "Best places to eat Indigenous foods in North America" list with the author L. Sasha Gora noting the sockeye salmon served there was "fresh and flavorful". Salmon n' Bannock was among the 150 restaurants chosen by author Gabby Peyton to represent Canada's culinary history in her 2023 book Where We Ate.

Mia Stainsby's review for the Vancouver Sun was more critical with regards to the offerings, stating that "the sides could use a makeover" in order for it to "raise it from homestyle cooking", but that "there was much to enjoy" from the starter dishes. Zoe Tennant in Canadian Culinary Imaginations compares Salmon n' Bannock to the nearby restaurant Forage in a discussion regarding the silence within locavore culture with regards to Indigenous cuisine.

=== Accolades ===
In 2013, Inez Cook was the recipient of the Outstanding Business Achiever award at the Indigenous Business Award Gala in recognition of her work creating Salmon n' Bannock.

In 2024, Salmon n' Bannock received the Indigenous Culinary Tourism Award during the Indigenous Tourism Awards. Mary Point, who served as Indigenous Relations Director at YVR Airport, accepted the award on behalf of Cook. Cook cited Point's insistence as being pivotal to the establishment of the second restaurant.

During The Georgia Straight's 25th Golden Plates award, Salmon n' Bannock was voted the best Indigenous restaurant by readers.

== See also ==
- ʔálʔal Café, another Indigenous-owned restaurant in Seattle, Washington
- Indigenous cuisine of the Americas
