= Out on the Shelves =

Non-profit LGBTQ library in Vancouver, Canada

- 49.271433111917084°N 123.1358614489615°W
- Location: 1555 Duranleau Street, Vancouver, Canada
- Type: LGBTQ
- Scope: Books, related materials
- Established: April 1983

Access and use
- Members: 300

Other information
- Website: outontheshelveslibrary.com

Out on the Shelves (OOTS) is an LGBTQ library located in Vancouver, British Columbia. Vancouver's oldest queer library, Out on the Shelves was founded as "the Gay Library" in April 1983. The library operates as a volunteer-run collective and aims to provide opportunities for members of the LGBTQ community to see themselves reflected in literature and film.

== Description ==
Although not formally affiliated with the University of British Columbia, the library is housed in the university's Resource Centre, through a partnership with the Student Resource Group. The library works closely with community partners, hosting outreach projects during the summer and participating in annual Vancouver Pride Parade celebrations.

OOTS operates as a collective composed of unpaid volunteers with no formal leadership structure. As of 2019, the library had around 300 members and 25 volunteers. The library's collection includes fiction and nonfiction books, new and rare books, mainstream and small press books, a children's and young adult section, and a small collection of DVDs. Although the library includes selected older books, the collection focus is on popular, contemporary titles.

== History ==
Out on the Shelves was established in April 1983 as "the Gay Library" on Davie Street, centre of the city's gay subculture. The Gay Library was part of a network of organizations dedicated to serving the gay community in Vancouver: initial funding was supported by a $500 grant from Gay Leisure Link, and in October 1984 the library became officially affiliated with Qmunity, then known as the Vancouver Gay Community Centre. Twelve founding members provided the impetus for the library's founding. The library provided support to young and old people as well as to parents of gay children.

The library's name changed from the Gay Library to the Gay and Lesbian Library, and then to the LGBT Library, before revising its name to Out on the Shelves. In 2015, OOTS was forced to move out of the Qmunity resource centre and the library collection was scattered, in some cases being located in members' garages. Library space was provided in 2016 by Pride UBC, the University of British Columbia Vancouver's LGBTQ resource centre. OOTS members managed the Pride UBC book collection as well as their own collection.

The library's collection has evolved over decades, from being focused on the white, gay male experience to including more diverse stories of the experiences of people of colour, as well as books featuring transgender, non-binary, Two-spirit, and bisexual narratives. In 2018, Out on the Shelves volunteers updated their local classification system designed to highlight relationships between gender and sexual identities; the classification is meant to be regularly updated.

In 2024, the library relocated to Granville Island, adjacent to downtown Vancouver.
