= Joe Average =

Canadian artist (1957–2024)

Joe Average CM OBC RCA
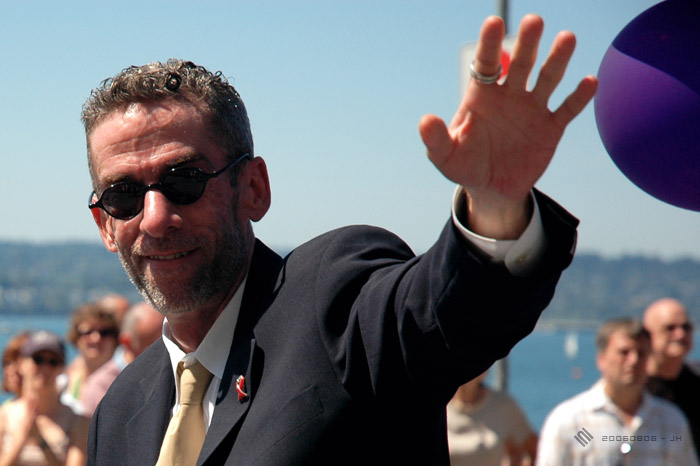
- Average in 2006
- Born: Brock David Tebbutt; 10 October 1957; Victoria, British Columbia, Canada
- Died: 24 December 2024 (aged 67); Vancouver, British Columbia, Canada
- Occupation: Artist
- Website: Official website

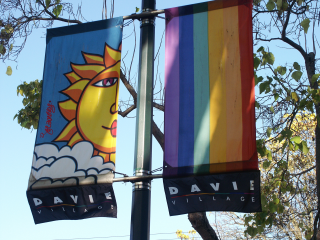
Banners designed by Joe Average decorate the Davie Village gaybourhood.

Joe Average, CM OBC RCA (born Brock David Tebbutt; 10 October 1957 – 24 December 2024) was a Canadian artist who resided in Vancouver, British Columbia. Diagnosed HIV+ at age 27, Average made the decision to commit the rest of his life to art, and to challenge himself to live by his art.

Average was born in Victoria, British Columbia, Canada on 10 October 1957. He frequently donated work to charitable causes, such as Vancouver's annual Art for Life auction benefitting the Vancouver Friends for Life Society. His work was used for such projects as A Loving Spoonful (a charity which provides meals to people with terminal illnesses) and the Davie Village. Average was also selected to judge submissions for Vancouver's AIDS memorial and anti-homophobia posters.

Average was known for his cheerful, colourful, cartoon-like work, including images of flowers, animals and insects, and people. He received many awards and honors, including civic merit awards, the Caring Canadian Award (1998) and the Queen's Golden Jubilee Silver Medal for Outstanding Community Achievement (2002). Vancouver mayor Philip Owen issued a civic proclamation to designate 3 November 2002 as "Joe Average Day" in the city.

Average was honored as one of two grand marshals of Vancouver's annual gay pride parade in August 2006. In 2011, he had lipodystrophy, a side effect of antiretroviral therapy.

On 23 April 2019, the Royal Canadian Mint released a coin with art by Average, said to symbolize the progress lesbian, gay, transgender, queer and two-spirited people have achieved in Canada as well as the work that still needs to be done. He died at home in Vancouver, on 24 December 2024, at the age of 67.

== Honours ==
- Governor General’s Caring Canadian Award (1998)
- Queen Elizabeth II Golden Jubilee Medal for Outstanding Community Achievement (2002)
- Joe Average Day, 3 November 2002, proclaimed by Vancouver Mayor Philip Owen.
- Royal Canadian Academy of Arts (2004)
- British Columbia Medal of Good Citizenship (2019)
- Order of British Columbia (2021)
- Order of Canada (December 2024)
