= Inez Cook =

Canadian Indigenous businesswoman and author (born 1969)

- Snitsmana
- Born: May 22, 1969 (age 57); Bella Coola, British Columbia, Canada
- Education: Seaquam Secondary School
- Occupations: Business owner, author
- Known for: Owner of Salmon n' Bannock

Inez Cook (traditional Nuxalk name: Snitsmana; born May 22, 1969) is a Canadian Indigenous businesswoman and author who is the co-founder and owner of the Salmon n' Bannock restaurant, Vancouver's only Indigenous-owned and operated restaurant specializing in First Nations cuisine. A survivor of the Sixties Scoop, Cook is known for her use of food, storytelling, and business leadership to reconnect with her Nuxalk identity.

== Early life and Sixties Scoop ==
Cook was born in Bella Coola, British Columbia, and is a member of the Nuxalk Nation. She was taken from her birth family as an infant during the Sixties Scoop, a Canadian government policy under which thousands of Indigenous children were removed from their communities and adopted into non-Indigenous families. Raised in Vancouver in a loving Dutch-Russian Mennonite household, Cook later recalled feeling a profound disconnection from her cultural roots despite her positive upbringing. She described experiencing "a deep yearning" for her Indigenous identity throughout her youth.

== Career ==
=== Aviation ===
Cook worked in aviation for more than three decades, including as a flight attendant. She served on Air Canada's Indigenous employee council, where she participated in initiatives related to Indigenous representation in corporate communications. She retired from aviation to focus on her work in the restaurant industry.

=== Salmon n' Bannock restaurant ===
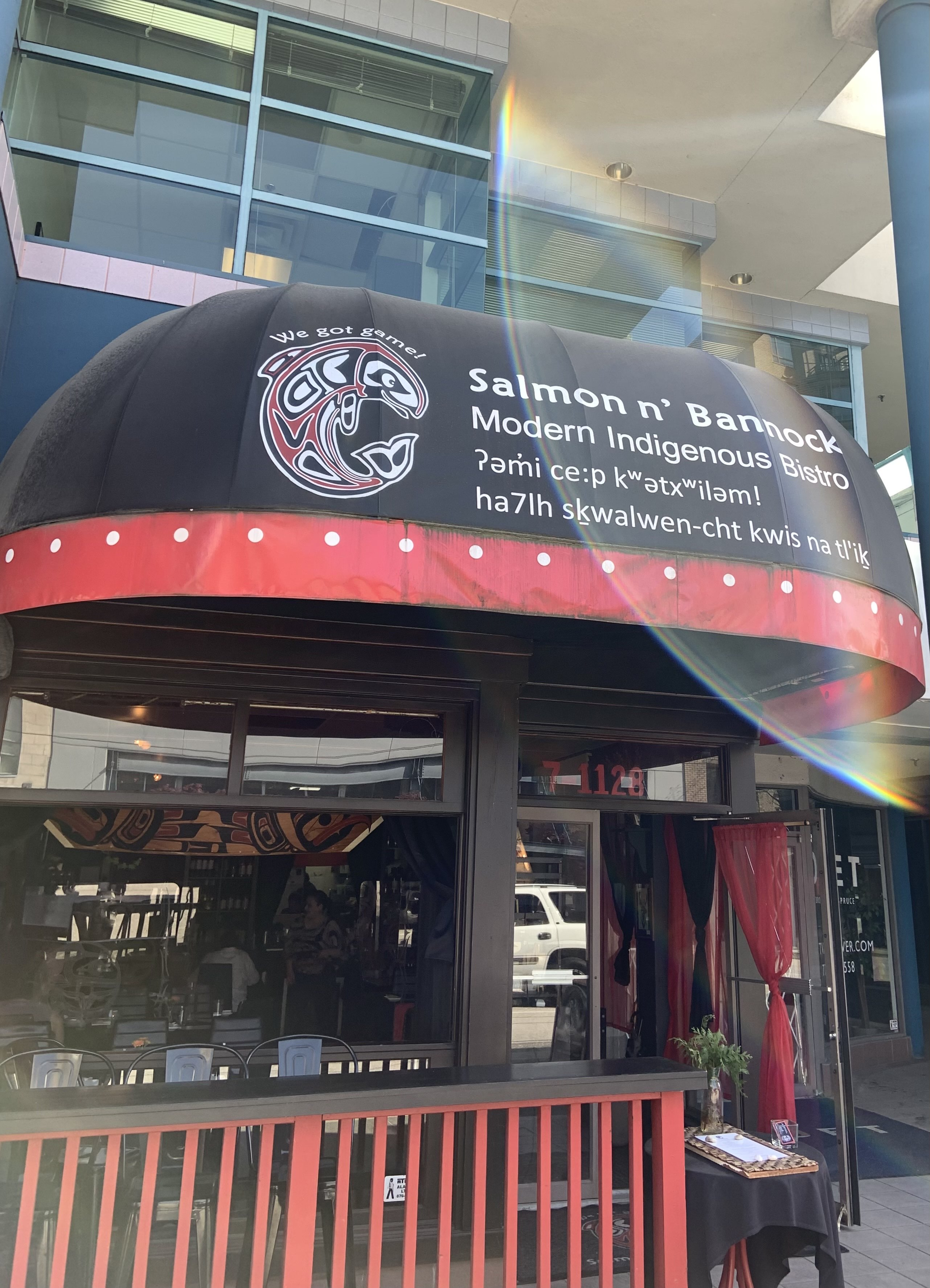
Salmon n' Bannock restaurant exterior in Vancouver.

Cook co-founded Salmon n' Bannock restaurant in Vancouver in 2010 after seeing a sign reading "Don't panic, we've got bannock," which inspired her to create a local Indigenous restaurant. The restaurant began when Cook took over a sublet restaurant space just months before the 2010 Winter Olympics. The venture grew despite early obstacles including traffic issues, limited parking, and later the COVID-19 pandemic. Salmon n' Bannock has since become a celebrated destination for Indigenous cuisine, expanding to a second location—Salmon n' Bannock On the Fly—in the international departures area of Vancouver International Airport (YVR).

The restaurant emphasizes traditional Indigenous ingredients such as salmon, bison, kelp, berries, and bannock, often reinterpreted with contemporary techniques. Cook collaborates closely with her kitchen team—an all-Indigenous staff representing multiple Nations—to create dishes that honour traditional foods while experimenting with modern flavours.

One of the restaurant's signature offerings is a modernized version of pemmican, made with smoked and hand-ground bison blended with sage-infused berries and cream cheese.

== Rediscovery of identity ==
Shortly after Salmon n' Bannock opened, members of the Nuxalk community visited the restaurant after reading reviews noting Cook's heritage. Initially skeptical, they asked Cook about her background. When Cook mentioned knowing her biological mother's name, this led to confirmation of her identity, and a Nuxalk community members formally welcomed her "home."

Cook later reunited with extended family, learned that her birth mother had passed away, and received a traditional Nuxalk name, Snitsmana, meaning "protector of the sacred dance, and lively", during a three-day potlatch ceremony in Bella Coola. She described the experience as transformative, bringing her a sense of belonging and helping her integrate both sides of her identity.

== Advocacy ==
Cook is known for her advocacy of Indigenous entrepreneurship and cultural reconciliation. She mentors emerging Indigenous business owners, particularly in the food industry, encouraging them to build enterprises rooted in community values. Through her restaurant, she promotes economic reconciliation by employing Indigenous staff, sourcing traditional ingredients, and creating a gathering place where Indigenous culture is shared with both community members and visitors. She has described her efforts as part of a "path towards reconciliACTION."

Cook also serves on the board of Indigenous Tourism BC, contributing to the development and promotion of a sustainable Indigenous tourism economy.

== Writing ==
Cook is the author of two children's books inspired by her experiences as a Sixties Scoop survivor, aimed at helping young readers understand issues of identity, belonging, and Indigenous history:

- Sixties Scoop (2018)
- Sixties Scoop: Reconnection (2023)

== Legacy and impact ==
Through Salmon n' Bannock, Cook has played a significant role in the growing national movement to reclaim Indigenous foodways and increase Indigenous visibility in Canadian hospitality. She has described the restaurant as both a culinary project and a personal journey, offering guests an experience rooted in culture, story, and community.

== Accolades ==
- In 2013, Inez Cook was the recipient of the Outstanding Business Achiever award at the Indigenous Business Award Gala in recognition of her work creating Salmon n' Bannock.
- In 2024, Salmon n' Bannock received the Indigenous Culinary Tourism Award during the Indigenous Tourism Awards. Mary Point, who served as Indigenous Relations Director at YVR Airport, accepted the award on behalf of Cook. Cook cited Point's insistence as being pivotal to the establishment of the second restaurant.
- During The Georgia Straight's 25th Golden Plates award, Salmon n' Bannock was voted the best Indigenous restaurant by readers.

== See also ==
- Indigenous peoples in Canada
- Indigenous cuisine of the Americas
- Bella Coola, British Columbia
