= The Junction (Vancouver) =

Gay bar and nightclub in Vancouver, Canada

- Logo
- Interactive map of The Junction
- Full name: The Junction Public House
- Former names: Pulse; The Majestic
- Address: 1138 Davie Street
- Location: Vancouver, British Columbia, Canada
- Coordinates: 49.281°N 123.132°W
- Type: Gay bar; nightclub

Website
- junctionpub.com

The Junction Public House, also known as The Junction Pub and most often abridged as The Junction, is a gay bar and nightclub in Davie Village, Vancouver, British Columbia. The club was formerly known as Pulse.

== Description ==
The Junction is a gay bar and nightclub located at 1138 Davie Street in Vancouver's Davie Village. According to the Canadian LGBTQ-focused online magazine Daily Xtra, the club welcomes straight people. Its website says, "Expect to get down with those that are straight — not narrow." Vince Marino co-owns The Junction and Pumpjack Pub, another gay bar.

== Reception ==
In 2014, Out Traveler's Jase Peeples wrote, "Whether you’re watching a hilarious drag show, enjoying a sexy striptease, or just spending a low-key afternoon on the front patio as you enjoy daily drink specials and a few tasty appetizers from the kitchen, the Junction is a must-hit stop for any trip over the Canadian rainbow." The Junction topped Queerty's list of "7 Great Canadian Gay Watering Holes to Add to Your Bucket List".

== See also ==
- List of LGBTQ bars
