= Numbers (Vancouver) =

Gay bar and nightclub in Vancouver, British Columbia, Canada

- Logo

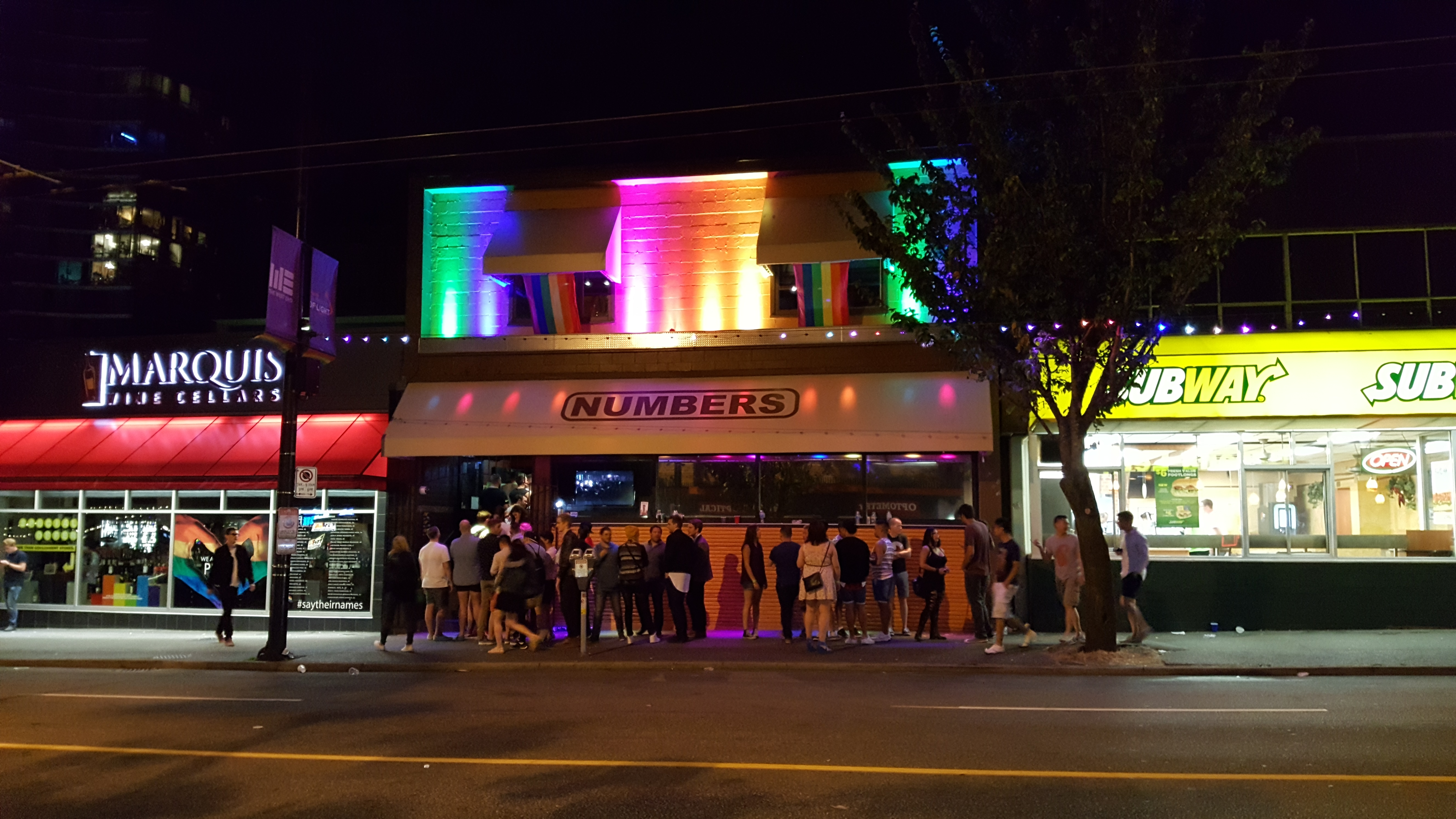
- The club's exterior in 2016
- Interactive map of Numbers
- Full name: Numbers Cabaret
- Address: 1042 Davie Street; Vancouver, British Columbia; V6E 1M3
- Coordinates: 49°16′47″N 123°07′50″W
- Type: Gay bar; nightclub

Construction
- Opened: c. 1980

Website
- www.numbers.ca

Numbers Cabaret, or simply Numbers, is a bar located in the Davie Village neighbourhood of Vancouver, British Columbia, Canada.

== Reception ==
In 2014, Out Traveler's Jase Peeples wrote, "A Vancouver landmark, Numbers is the oldest gay bar in the city, having opened its doors more than three decades ago. The multilevel space remains one of the most popular gay nightlife spots in Davie Village, with karaoke available seven days a week in the special 'FunBox' room. A full dance floor, pool tables, and multiple video screens located throughout the bar ensure that this location has something to offer everyone." Numbers was included in Queerty's list of "7 Great Canadian Gay Watering Holes to Add to Your Bucket List".

== See also ==
- List of LGBTQ bars
