= Qmunity =

LGBT community centre in Vancouver, Canada

- Qmunity logo
- Type: Community centre
- Purpose: LGBT community
- Headquarters: Vancouver, British Columbia
- Location(s): 1170 Bute Street Vancouver, British Columbia V6E 1Z6
- Coordinates: 49.28187425049966°N 123.1329487403798°W
- Region served: British Columbia
- Main organ: Board of directors
- Staff: 13
- Volunteers: 700
- Website: qmunity.ca

Qmunity (officially Qmunity, BC's Queer, Trans, and Two-Spirit Resource Centre Society), formerly known as the Centre, is an LGBT community centre located on Bute Street in the Davie Village neighbourhood of the West End of Vancouver, British Columbia, Canada. In 2024, it served over 15,000 people in British Columbia.

== Activities and initiatives ==
Qmunity houses or operates a number of programs and initiatives, including the Vancouver Pride House during the 2010 Winter Olympic Games; the Transgender Health Program, a program operated in cooperation with the Vancouver Coastal Health regional health authority and which moved to Qmunity after Vancouver General Hospital's Gender Clinic closed in 2002.

=== Pride House Vancouver ===
The Vancouver location of Pride House was housed within Qmunity. During the 2010 Winter Olympics, the Vancouver and Whistler Pride Houses served as venues for LGBT sportspeople, coaches, visitors and their friends, families and supporters, and became the first Pride Houses at an Olympics. Although both Pride Houses offered information and support services to LGBT athletes and attendees, the Whistler location in Pan Pacific Village Centre had a "celebratory theme", while the Vancouver venue emphasised education about Vancouver's LGBT community and, for non-Canadian athletes, information about immigration to and asylum in Canada, including "legal resources" from Egale Canada and the International Lesbian, Gay, Bisexual, Trans and Intersex Association (IGLA).

Notable visitors to Pride House Vancouver include openly gay Canadian Olympic swimmers Mark Tewksbury and Marion Lay, as well as Vancouver mayor Gregor Robertson and American political satirist Stephen Colbert.

=== Affiliation with Out on the Shelves ===
Out on the Shelves, also known as "the Gay Library", became affiliated with Qmunity in October 1984. In 2015, Out on the Shelves was forced to move out of the Qmunity Resource Center, and the library collection was scattered.

=== New community centre ===
In July 2022, Vancouver City Council approved a nominal lease for Qmunity for a space in a new, 17-storey building at 981 Davie Street to house new facilities for the group. The Qmunity Community Centre is set to open in 2027.

== See also ==
- List of LGBT community centres
