= Davie Village =

- Neighbourhood
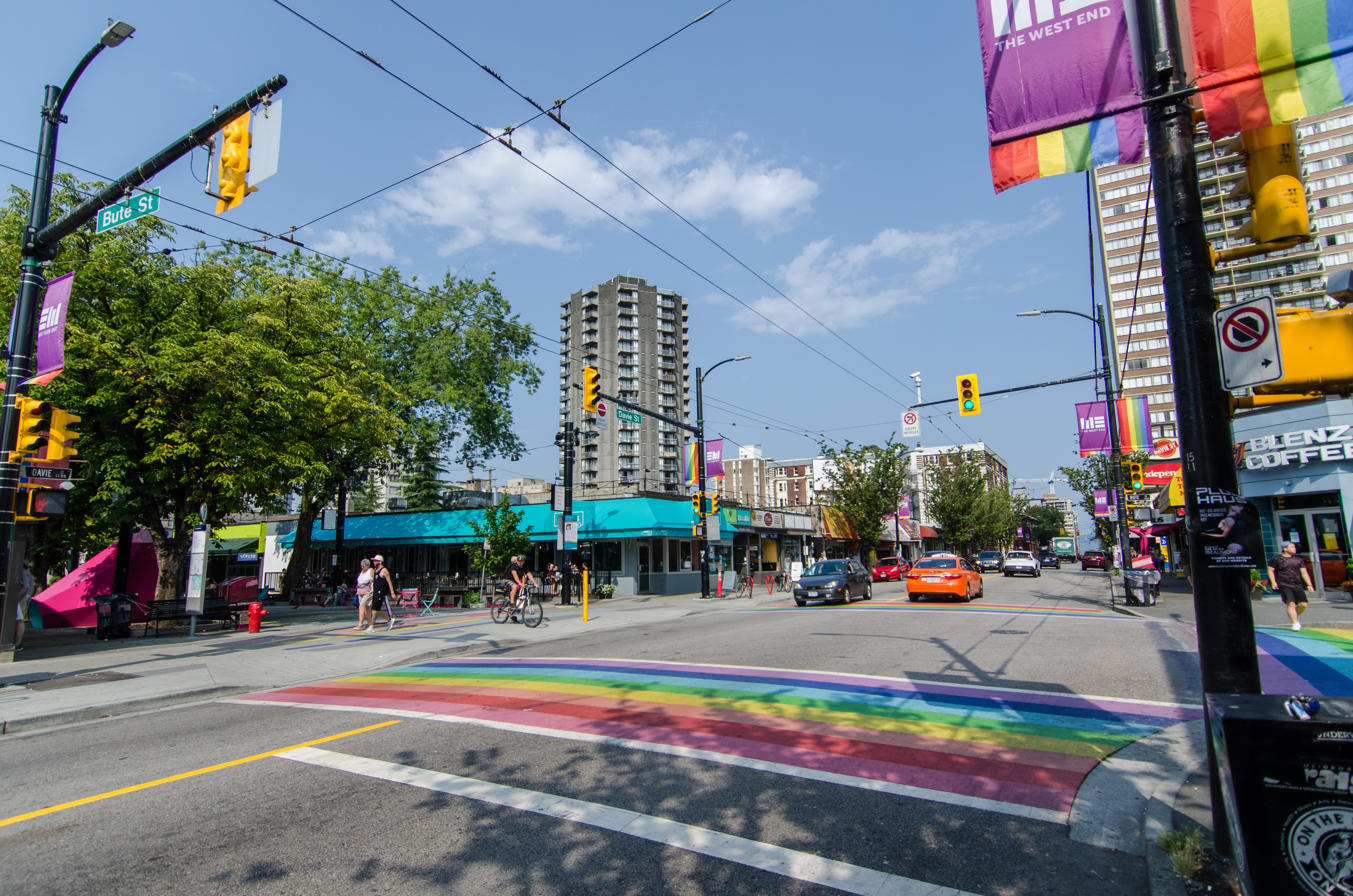
- Davie Village Davie Street & Bute Street (2018)
- Country: Canada
- Province: British Columbia
- City: Vancouver
- Time zone: UTC-8 (PST)
  - Summer (DST): UTC-7 (PDT)

Davie Street
- Namesake: A.E.B. Davie
- Type: Street
- Location: West End
- Nearest metro station: Yaletown–Roundhouse station
- NW end: Beach Avenue
- SE end: Marinaside Crescent

Other
- Known for: Gaybourhood
- Website: davievillage.ca

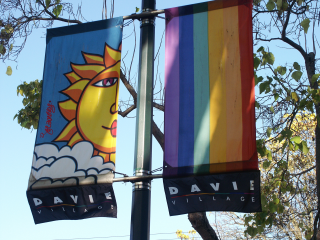
Davie Village lamppost banners

Davie Village (also known as Davie District or simply Davie Street) is a neighbourhood in the West End of Vancouver, British Columbia, Canada. It is the home of the city's LGBT subculture, and, as such, is often considered a gay village, or gaybourhood. Davie Village is centred on Davie Street and roughly includes the area between Burrard and Jervis streets. Davie Street—and, by extension, the Village—is named in honour of A.E.B. Davie, eighth Premier of British Columbia from 1887 to 1889; A.E.B's brother Theodore was also Premier, from 1892 to 1895.

== Overview ==
Along Davie Street are a variety of shops, restaurants, services, and hotels catering to a variety of customers, in addition to private residences. One notorious business on the street is Little Sister's Book and Art Emporium (aka "Little Sister's"), a gay and lesbian bookstore. It experienced numerous legal battles with Canada Customs, which received extensive national media coverage. Many businesses and residents along Davie Street and in the West End fly rainbow flags as a symbol of gay pride, and many of the covered bus stop benches and garbage cans along Davie Street are painted bright pink.

=== Scene ===
- Numbers (Vancouver)
- The Junction (Vancouver)
- Pumpjack Pub

=== Festivals ===
The Village hosts a variety of events during the year, including the Davie Street Pride Festival which runs in conjunction with Vancouver's annual Gay Pride Parade, during which sections of the street are closed to motor traffic.

Davie Day is also held each year in early September, to celebrate local businesses and the community itself. This Day is designed to build awareness and promote the surrounding businesses, and is focused around Jervis to Burrard Street.

== Business Association ==
The Davie Street Business Association coined the name "Davie Village" in 1999 and also commissioned banners from local artist Joe Average, which fly from lampposts in the district. The two-sided banners depict a rainbow flag on one side and a sun design by Average on the other.

Davie Village is also home to the offices of Xtra! West, a biweekly LGBT newspaper, Qmunity (formerly the Gay and Lesbian Centre) which provides a variety of services for the city's lesbian, gay, bisexual, and transgender residents, and the Vancouver Pride Society, which puts on the annual Pride Parade and Festival.

== Sex work history ==
In the 1960s, after the removal of the Dupont and Alexander Street Districts, Vancouver's sex workers relocated to the streets of the West End. By the 1970s, over 150 workers could be seen walking on and around Davie Street from twelve to three AM on a regular occasion. By the 1970s, the area had a visible sex work scene, and was coined the “Prostitution Capitol of Canada”. Jamie Lee Hamilton, a former worker within the area, claims in a The Volcano article that the neighbourhood had a “dignified outdoor brothel culture". The working population included both cisgender, transgender, two-spirit, and crossdressing individuals of different ages and ethnicities; many of which first came to the street as early as twelve years old, and since, have built a community with their peers, creating bonds by working together and looking out for each other's safety. In 1980, when Davie Street started to generate profit off of queer owned properties and business aesthetics, the visible state of the sex work scene became more and more unwanted. Within little time, the removal of this image became the main focus of erasure. In preparation for the 1986 World Fair, Davie Street soon began sculpting an image of what they felt suited the ideal gay community, which included the forceful displacement of the West Ends’ sex work community. In 1983, a group called the Concerned Residents of the West End (CROWE), consisting of primarily white gay men and women, worked with the city to get a BC Supreme Court injunction to displace sex workers. Workers in the area were pushed into Yaletown, then Mount Pleasant, where they were repeatedly protested by "Shame the Johns vigilantes", down East Broadway, and eventually into the Downtown Eastside, where already vulnerable sex workers are more open to violence and abuse than ever before. This relocation also contributed many of the Missing and Murdered Indigenous Women and Girls (MMIWG) cases that were largely tied to serial killer Robert Pickton in the early 2000s. Apart from the annual Red Umbrella March and Women's Memorial March, the history of the West Ends’ sex work community remains largely forgotten. While portraying an accepting and inclusive LGBTQ2A+ environment, the history remains intentionally masked with little memorabilia of those impacted by the erasure.

=== Significant sites ===
- West End Sex Worker Memorial: Corner of Jervis and Pendrell Street

=== Supporting businesses ===
- Little Sisters Book and Art Emporium
- Speakeasy Bar and Grill

=== Media documentation ===
- Hookers on Davie

== See also ==
- Bank Street (Ottawa)
- Church and Wellesley Village, Toronto
- Gay Village, Montreal
- LGBT culture in Vancouver
- Liliget Feast House, a former Indigenous restaurant that was situated on Davie Street
