= Celebrities Nightclub =

Bar and nightclub in Vancouver, Canada

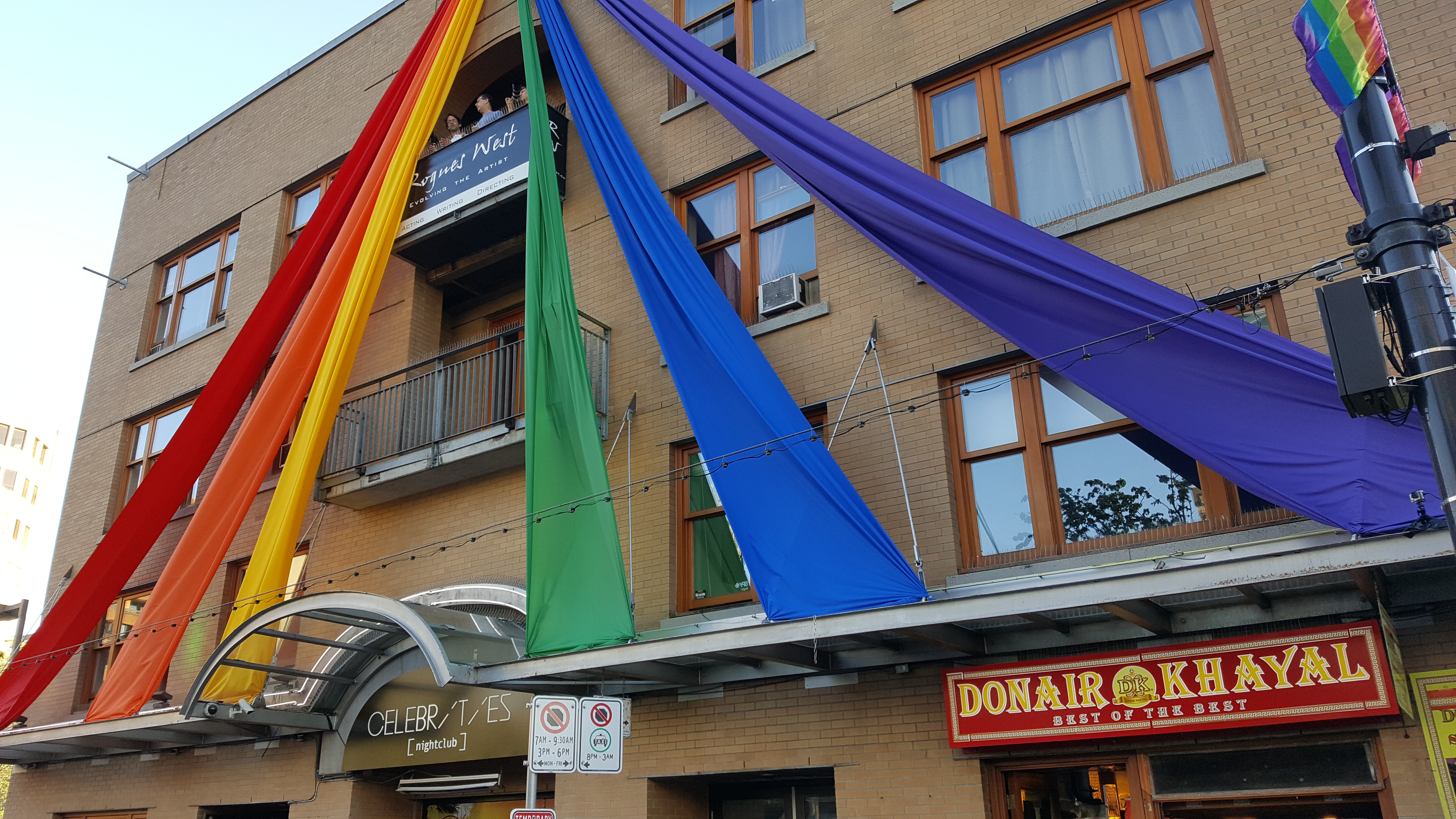
- The nightclub's exterior, 2016

General information
- Type: Gay bar and nightclub
- Location: Vancouver, British Columbia, Canada
- Coordinates: 49.27934°N 123.13°W
- Opened: 1978
- Renovated: 2013

Website
- Official website

Celebrities Nightclub, or simply Celebrities, is a gay bar and nightclub in Vancouver, British Columbia, Canada. The club opened in 1978, and underwent a $1 million renovation in 2013.

The venue is recognized by the Vancouver Heritage Foundation.

== See also ==
- List of LGBTQ bars
