= BC Gay and Lesbian Archives =

LGBT archive about British Columbia, Canada

Founded in 1976, the BC Gay and Lesbian Archives is a resource for the British Columbia (BC) queer community and its allies. The archives are located in Vancouver's West End, traditionally the epicenter of the city's gay and lesbian community. The holdings are maintained by founder and archivist Ron Dutton, who operates the archives out of his home.

The collection was donated to the City of Vancouver Archives in 2018. See the City of Vancouver Archives website for additional details on the BC Gay and Lesbian Archives fonds. Included in the collection donation are a number of periodicals, including runs of the longstanding (1980–1998) Vancouver publication, Angles, and its predecessor, VGCC News.

The archive holdings include 750,000 items that span 1700 to the present, and include media, personal papers such as diaries, photographs and films, and reports from the government and academic researchers. Dutton strives to maintain a diverse collection, particularly focusing on women, people of colour, two-spirited people, and people with disabilities, whose histories are often underrepresented by Vancouver's white- and male-dominated media. The archive users are largely academic researchers and the media, as well as university students, authors, filmmakers, and representatives of gay and lesbian community organizations. For example, it has been a major resource for AIDS Vancouver as they sought to document thirty years of HIV/AIDS history in the Vancouver area.
