= ʔálʔal Café =

Restaurant in Seattle, Washington, U.S.

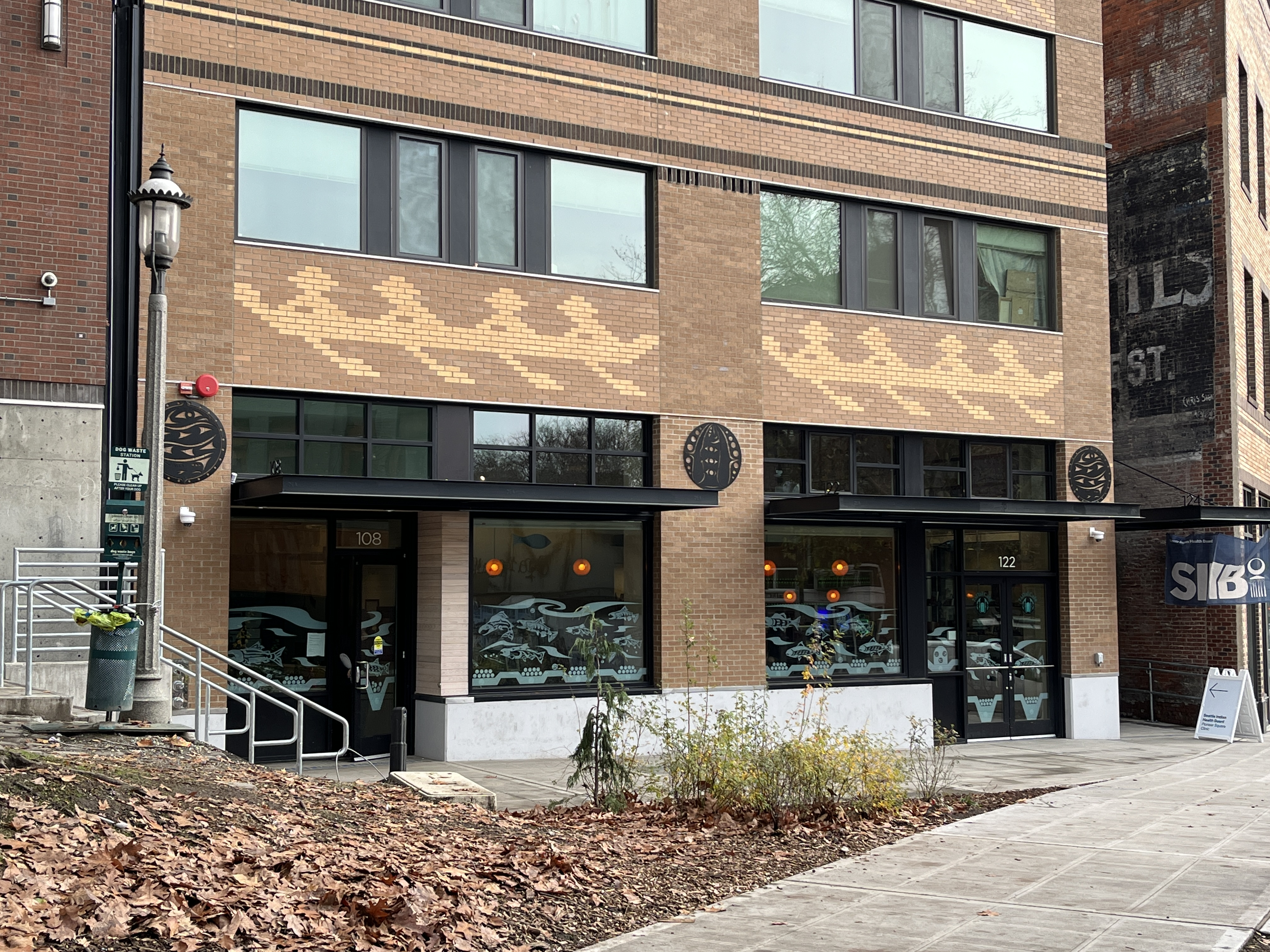
- The restaurant's exterior, 2022
- Interactive map of ʔálʔal Café

Restaurant information
- Established: November 29, 2022
- Closed: July 24, 2024
- Owner: Chief Seattle Club
- Food type: Indigenous
- Location: 122 2nd Avenue S, Seattle, King, Washington, 98104, United States
- Coordinates: 47.6013°N 122.3314°W
- Website: alalcafe.org

The ʔálʔal Café (ALL-all) was a restaurant in Pioneer Square, Seattle, in the U.S. state of Washington. It operated from 2022 to 2024.

== Description ==
The name ʔalʔal (stylized as "ʔálʔal") means "home" in Lushootseed. The café operated on the ground floor of a Chief Seattle Club housing complex for people of Native descent. The interior featured Native artworks, including a mural depicting the transition from the pre-Columbian era to modern society. The restaurant had high ceilings and "rustic" tree-trunk tables. It used dark blue mugs stamped with the cafe's name. According to KSTW, the business aimed to "[reclaim] and [reintroduce]" Indigenous cuisine of the Americas "in a modern café setting". The menu included blue corn mush with wojape, wild rice bowls with berry vinaigrette, braised bison tacos with pickled onions, Northwest salmon, cornbread, and coffee. Many ingredients were sourced from Native producers.

== History ==
ʔálʔal Café opened on November 29, 2022. The business was owned and operated by the nonprofit organization Chief Seattle Club, which provides services for Indigenous people living in urban areas. Profits from the café supported the organization. ʔálʔal Café closed permanently on July 24, 2024. Chief Seattle Club's executive director said, "Unfortunately, the Café was not profitable, and to continue operating, we would have had to divert resources essential for providing housing to our community. Although we are saddened by the Café's closing, we will continue to provide housing at the ʔálʔal facility and transform the café into a space for expanded cultural programming for our members and community.”

== Reception ==
In Eater Seattle's 2023 overview of the city's ideal eateries for remote work, Harry Cheadle called ʔálʔal a "gem" and a "beautiful" space. Following the restaurant's closure, the website's Harry Cheadle wrote, "ʔálʔal will be missed not just because it was a demonstration of what Native food could be. It was a genuinely cool place to hang out or work remotely."

== See also ==
- Indigenous peoples of the Pacific Northwest Coast
- List of defunct restaurants of the United States
