= Pumpjack Pub =

Gay bar in Vancouver, Canada

- Interactive map of Pumpjack Pub
- Address: 1167 Davie Street
- Location: Vancouver, British Columbia, Canada
- Coordinates: 49.28164316913515°N 123.13215094633733°W
- Type: Gay bar

Website
- pumpjackpub.com

Pumpjack Pub is a gay bar in Vancouver's Davie Village neighborhood, in British Columbia, Canada.

== Description and history ==
The bar opened in December 2000, and caters to the bear and leather subcultures. Steve Bauer and Vince Marino are co-owners, as of 2006. Marino describes Pumpjack as a "community bar".

By mid 2006, Pumpjack had raised approximately $185,000 for various causes, including more than $30,000 for HIV/AIDS organizations. The pub underwent renovations for nine months, re-opening in mid 2014 and doubling its capacity from 107 to 244 seats. The expansion was part of the West End Community Plan, which seeks to "enhance Davie Village's distinctive character as a hub for the LGBTQ community through the use of colour and lighting, and as a space for nightlife, celebration, events, gathering and community programming".

== See also ==
- List of LGBTQ bars
