= CoffeeCon =

Festival in the United States

CoffeeCon is a festival for coffee enthusiasts. CoffeeCon travels to major coffee cities in the United States. It was created by coffee author and video producer Kevin Sinnott, who wrote the book The Art & Craft of Coffee and produced a how-to video called Coffee Brewing Secrets.

== History ==
While working on specialized projects, Sinnott noticed several industry business-to-business coffee events such as the Specialty Coffee Association of America and the National Coffee Association. While some local coffee shops were holding brewing seminars, there were no large scale festivals exclusively for coffee consumers. He decided to turn his book and his video into a live event. He created CoffeeCon as a place where coffee enthusiasts could taste samples from regional coffee roasters side-by-side, learn about coffee from national and local coffee experts and attend coffee topic classes on almost every brewing method. He began hosting live events, called coffee meet-ups.

The first CoffeeCon was held on February 25, 2012, and started with a grant for the local tourism commission in Warrenville, IL. It attracted over 1,000 consumers. The second event was held on May 4, 2013, again, in Warrenville, IL In 2014, CoffeeCon expanded to other cities and states. On April 12, 2014, it was held at the Zhou B Art Center in Chicago, IL. Art elements and a Writer's Roundtable Panel to discuss the topic of new media writing were added to the event. Another event was held in San Francisco on July 26, 2014, at Terra Galleries.

CoffeeCon LA was held on November 8, 2014, at Mack Sennett Studios in Silver Lake. Mack Sennett was a silent movie director and produced the KeyStone Cops. Kevin Sinnott stated "It was like a coming home." I believe Mack would be proud that another Sinnott was at work in his studio.

CoffeeCon NYC was held on March 7, 2015.

CoffeeCon Chicago occurred on July 25, 2015.

On January 27–28, 2017, CoffeeCon held its first ever, multi-day convention. The event was held at the Seattle Center Armory, in Seattle, Washington.

Event	Date	Location	Approximate attendance
"CoffeeCon 2012"	February 25, 2012	Warrenville, Illinois	1,000+
"CoffeeCon 2013"	May 4, 2013	Warrenville, Illinois	Approximately 2,000
"CoffeeCon 2014 - Chicago"	April 12, 2014	Zhou B Art Center; Chicago, Illinois	
"CoffeeCon 2014 - San Francisco"	July 26, 2014	Terra Galleries; San Francisco, California	700+
"CoffeeCon 2014 - Los Angeles"	November 8, 2014	Mack Sennett Studios; Silverlake, California	
"CoffeeCon 2015 - New York City"	March 7, 2015	Broad Street Ballroom; New York City, New York	
"CoffeeCon 2015 - Chicago"	July 25, 2015	Morgan Manufacturing; Chicago, Illinois	
"CoffeeCon 2016 - Los Angeles"	January 30, 2016	Magic Box LA at The Reef; Los Angeles, California	
"CoffeeCon 2016 - New York City"	June 4, 2016	Industry City; Brooklyn, New York City	1,000+
"CoffeeCon 2017 - Seattle"	January 27–28, 2017	Seattle Center Armory; Seattle, Washington	
"CoffeeCon 2017 - Los Angeles"	February 25–26, 2017	Magic Box LA at The Reef; Los Angeles, California	
"CoffeeCon 2017 - Chicago"	October 7–8, 2017	Revel Space; Chicago, Illinois	
"CoffeeCon 2018- New York"	May 19-20, 2018	Villain LLC New York City, New York	
"CoffeeCon 2018 - Seattle"	July 28-29, 2018	Fremont Studios Seattle, Washington	
"CoffeeCon 2018 - Los Angeles"	February 3-4, 2018	The Reef; Los Angeles, California	
"CoffeeCon 2018 - Chicago"	October 27-28, 2018	The Chicago Cultural Center Chicago, Illinois	
"CoffeeCon 2023 - Chicaho"	October 14-15, 2023	St. James Farm Warrenville, Illinois	
