= Century 21 Exposition =

World's fair held in Seattle, Washington

1962 Seattle
- Century 21 Exposition logo

Overview
- BIE-class: Universal exposition
- Category: Second category General Exposition
- Name: Century 21 Exposition
- Motto: Living in the Space Age
- Building(s): Space Needle and Washington State Pavilion
- Area: 74 acres (30 hectares)
- Invention(s): Bubbleator, Friendship 7
- Visitors: 9,609,969
- Organized by: Edward E. Carlson

Participant(s)
- Countries: 24

Location
- Country: United States
- City: Seattle
- Venue: Broad Street
- Coordinates: 47°37′17″N 122°21′03″W

Timeline
- Bidding: 1955
- Opening: April 21, 1962
- Closure: October 21, 1962

Universal expositions
- Previous: Expo 58 in Brussels
- Next: Expo 67 in Montreal

The Century 21 Exposition (also known as the Seattle World's Fair) was a world's fair held April 21, 1962, to October 21, 1962, in Seattle, Washington, United States. Nearly 10 million people attended the fair during its six-month run.

As planned, the exposition left behind a fairground and numerous public buildings and public works; some credit it with revitalizing Seattle's economic and cultural life (see History of Seattle (1940–present)). The fair saw the construction of the Space Needle and Alweg monorail, as well as several sports venues (Washington State Coliseum, now Climate Pledge Arena) and performing arts buildings (the Playhouse, now the Cornish Playhouse), most of which have since been replaced or heavily remodeled. Unlike some other world's fairs of its era, Century 21 made a profit.

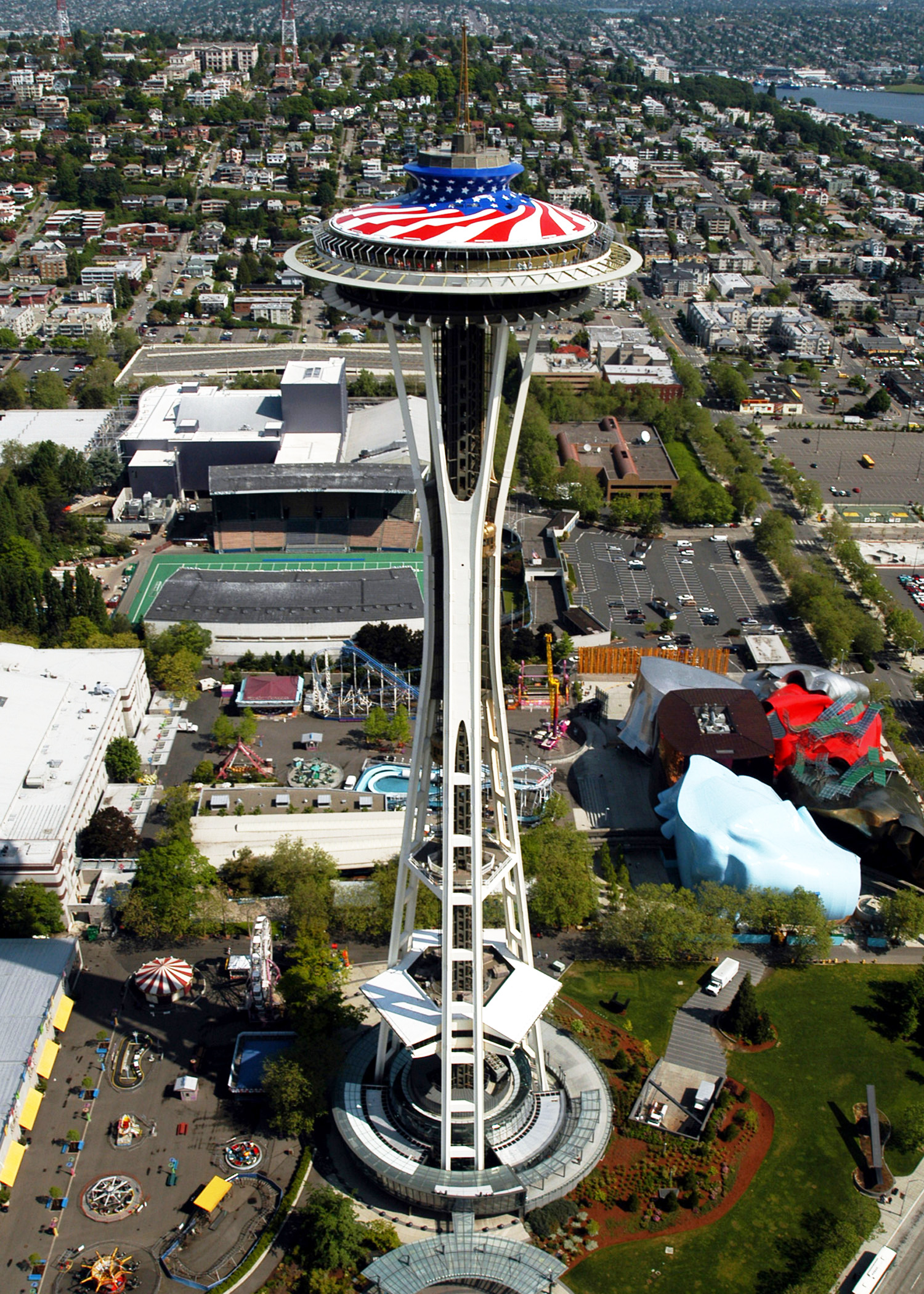
Aerial photograph of the Space Needle in 2003 decorated for Memorial Day

The site, slightly expanded since the fair, is now called the Seattle Center; the United States Science Pavilion is now Pacific Science Center. Another notable Seattle Center building, the Museum of Pop Culture (earlier called EMP Museum), was built nearly 40 years later and designed to fit in with the fairground atmosphere.

== Planning and funding ==
Seattle mayor Allan Pomeroy is credited with bringing the World's Fair to the city. He recruited community and business leaders, as well as running a petition campaign, in the early 1950s to convince the city council to approve an $8.5 million bond issue to build the opera house and sports center needed to attract the fair. Eventually the council approved a $7.5 million bond issue with the state of Washington matching that amount. Planning officials agreed to proposals by prominent scientists to showcase the scientific achievements of the United States of America. About 75 percent of the fair buildings were constructed to be permanent.

== Cold War and Space Race context ==
The fair was originally conceived at a Washington Athletic Club luncheon in 1955 to mark the 50th anniversary of the 1909 Alaska–Yukon–Pacific Exposition, but it soon became clear that that date was too ambitious. With the Space Race underway and Boeing having "put Seattle on the map" as "an aerospace city", a major theme of the fair was to show that "the United States was not really 'behind' the Soviet Union in the realms of science and space". As a result, the themes of space, science, and the future completely trumped the earlier conception of a "Festival of the [American] West".

In June 1960, the Bureau International des Expositions (BIE) certified Century 21 as a world's fair. Project manager Ewen Dingwall went to Moscow to request Soviet participation, but was turned down. Neither the People's Republic of China, Vietnam nor North Korea were invited.

As it happened, the Cold War had an additional effect on the fair. President John F. Kennedy was supposed to attend the closing ceremony of the fair on October 21, 1962. He bowed out, pleading a "heavy cold"; it later became public that he was dealing with the Cuban Missile Crisis.

The fair's vision of the future displayed a technologically based optimism that did not anticipate any dramatic social change, one rooted in the 1950s rather than in the cultural tides that would emerge in the 1960s. Affluence, automation, consumerism, and American power would grow; social equity would simply take care of itself on a rising tide of abundance; the human race would master nature through technology rather than view it in terms of ecology. In contrast, 12 years later—even in far more conservative Spokane, Washington—Expo '74 took environmentalism as its central theme. The theme of Spokane's Expo '74 was "Celebrating Tomorrow's Fresh New Environment.".

== Buildings and grounds ==
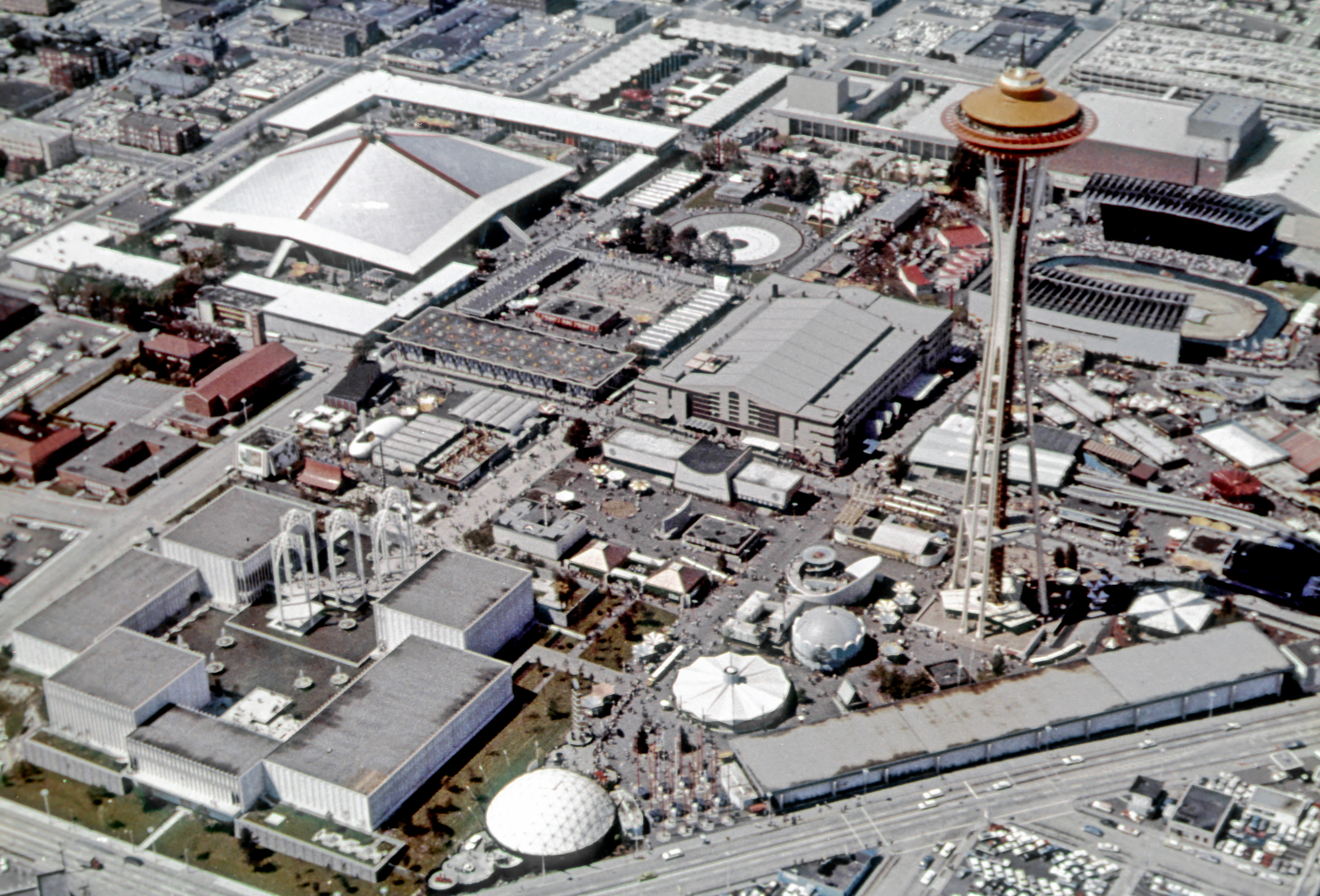
Aerial view of the fairgrounds in 1962

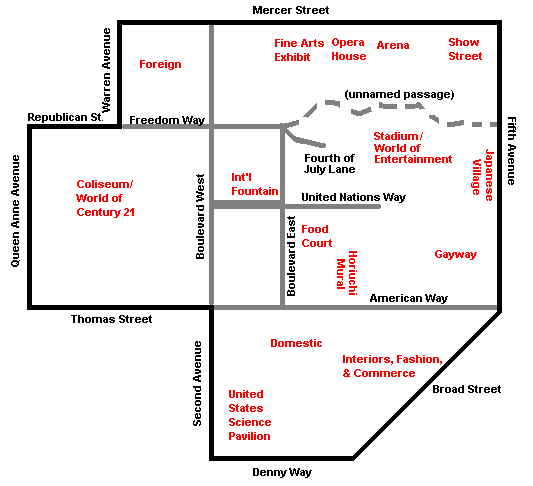
Map showing major features of the grounds

Once the fair idea was conceived, several sites were considered. Among the sites considered within Seattle were Duwamish Head in West Seattle; Fort Lawton (now Discovery Park) in the Magnolia neighborhood; and First Hill—even closer to Downtown than the site finally selected, but far more densely developed. Two sites south of the city proper were considered—Midway, near Des Moines, and the Army Depot in Auburn—as was a site east of the city on the south shore of Lake Sammamish.

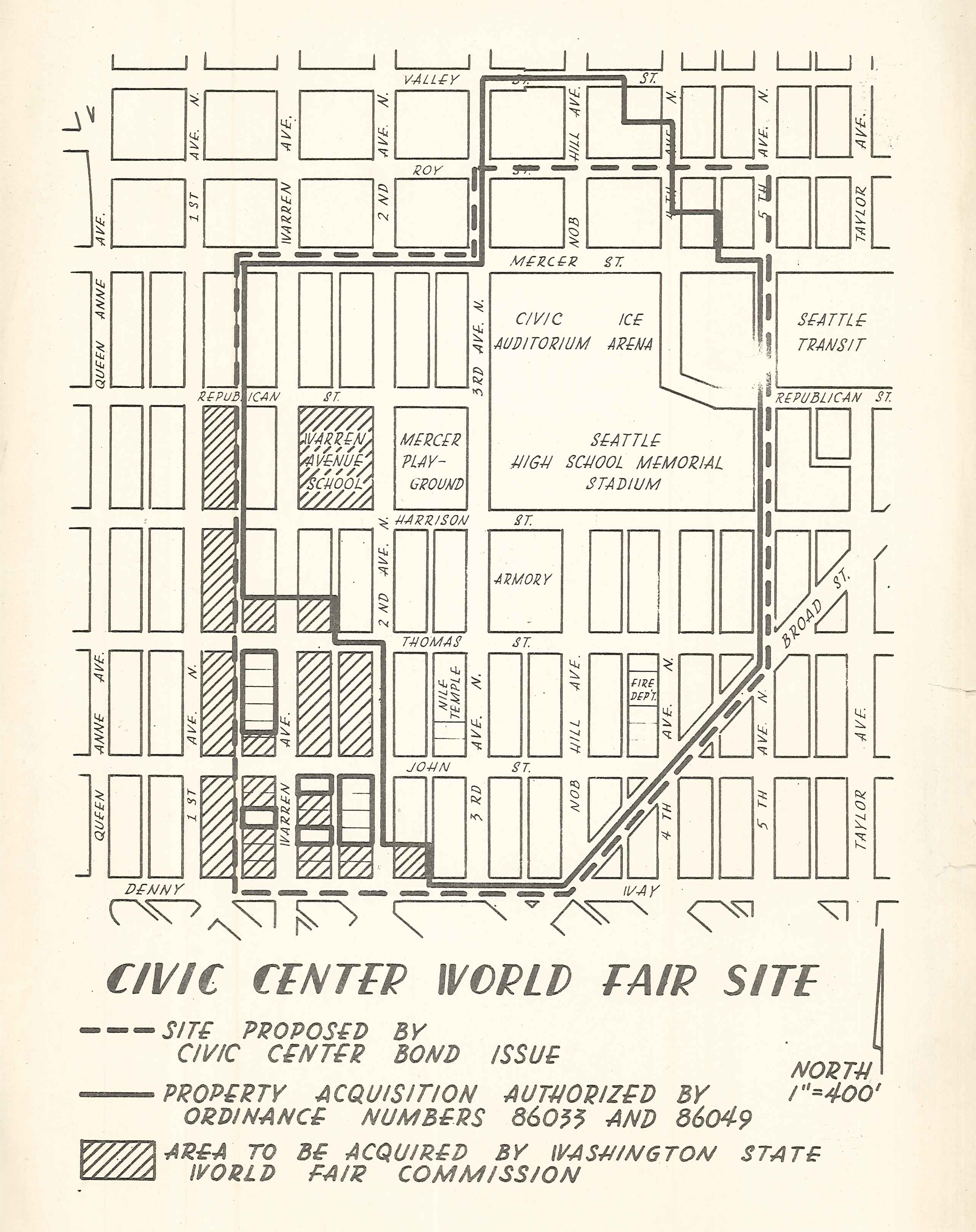
1960 map of what became the grounds of the Century 21 Exposition

The site finally selected for the Century 21 Exposition had originally been contemplated for a civic center. The idea of using it for the world's fair came later and brought in federal money for the United States Science Pavilion (now Pacific Science Center) and state money for the Washington State Coliseum (later Seattle Center Coliseum; renamed KeyArena in 1993 after the city sold naming rights to KeyCorp, the company doing business as KeyBank; renamed Climate Pledge Arena in 2021 after naming rights were sold to Amazon.com, Inc). Some of the land had been donated to the city by James Osborne in 1881 and by David and Louisa Denny in 1889. Two lots at Third Avenue N. and John Street were purchased from St. Demetrios Greek Orthodox Church, who had been planning to build a new church building there; the church used the proceeds to purchase land in the Montlake neighborhood. The Warren Avenue School, a public elementary school with several programs for physically Disabled students, was torn down, its programs dispersed, and provided most of the site of the Coliseum (now Climate Pledge Arena). Near the school, some of the city's oldest houses, apartments, and commercial buildings were torn down; they had been run down to the point of being known as the "Warren Avenue slum". The old Fire Station No. 4 was also sacrificed.

As early as the 1909 Bogue plan, this part of Lower Queen Anne had been considered for a civic center. The Civic Auditorium (later the Opera House, now McCaw Hall), the ice arena (later Mercer Arena), and the Civic Field (rebuilt in 1946 as the High School Memorial Stadium), all built in 1927 had been placed there based on that plan, as was an armory (the Food Circus during the fair, later Center House).

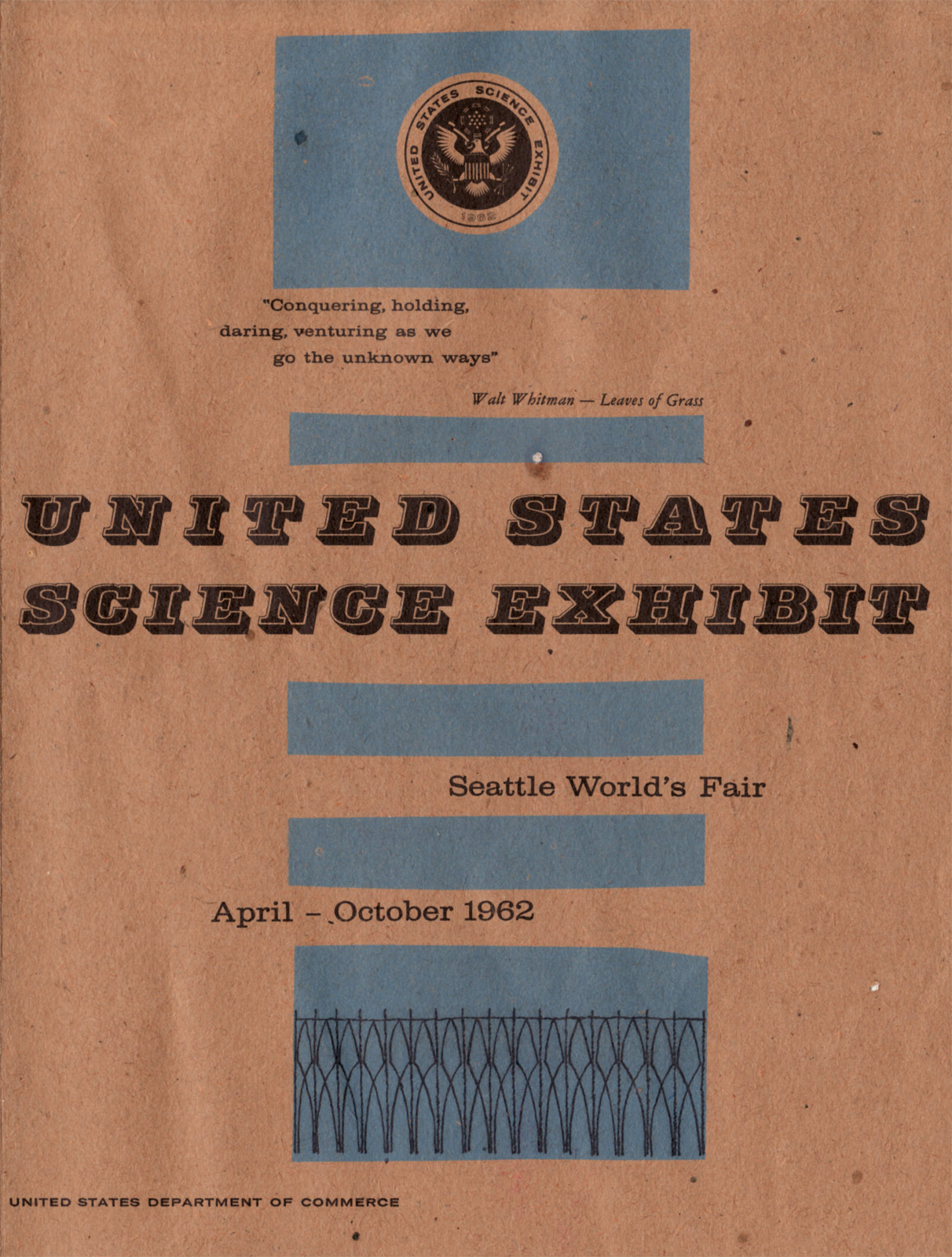
Cover of the United States Science Exhibit Guide for the Seattle World's Fair, United States Department of Commerce

The fair planners also sought two other properties near the southwest corner of the grounds. They failed completely to make any inroads with the Seattle Archdiocese of the Roman Catholic Church, who had recently built Sacred Heart Church there; they did a bit better with the Freemasons' Nile Temple, which they were able to use for the duration of the fair and which then returned to its previous use. It served as the site of the Century 21 Club. This membership organization, formed especially for the fair, charged $250 for membership and offered lounge, dining room, and other club facilities, as well as a gate pass for the duration of the fair. The city ended up leasing the property after the fair and in 1977 bought it from the Masons. The building was eventually incorporated into a theater complex including the Seattle Children's Theatre.

Paul Thiry was the fair's chief architect; he also designed the Coliseum building. Among the other architects of the fair, Seattle-born Minoru Yamasaki received one of his first major commissions to build the United States Science Pavilion. Yamasaki would later design New York's World Trade Center. Victor Steinbrueck and John Graham, Jr. designed the Space Needle. Hideki Shimizu and Kazuyuki Matsushita designed the original International Fountain. Despite the plan to build a permanent civic center, more than half the structures built for the fair were torn down more or less immediately after it ended. One attempt to conserve installations from Century 21 was the creation of a replica "welcoming pole," a number of which originally stood tall over the southern entrance to the fair. This replica stood outside the Washington State Capital Museum until 1990, when it was taken down.

The grounds of the fair were divided into:

- World of Science
- World of Century 21 (also known as World of Tomorrow)
- World of Commerce and Industry
- World of Art
- World of Entertainment
- Show Street
- Gayway
- Boulevards of the World
- Exhibit Fair
- Food and Favors
- Food Circus

Besides the monorail, which survives as of 2023, the fair also featured a Skyride that ran 1,400 feet (430 m) across the grounds from the Gayway to the International Mall. The bucket-like three-person cars were suspended from cables that rose as high as 60 feet (18 m) off the ground. The Skyride was moved to the Puyallup Fairgrounds in 1980.

=== World of Science ===
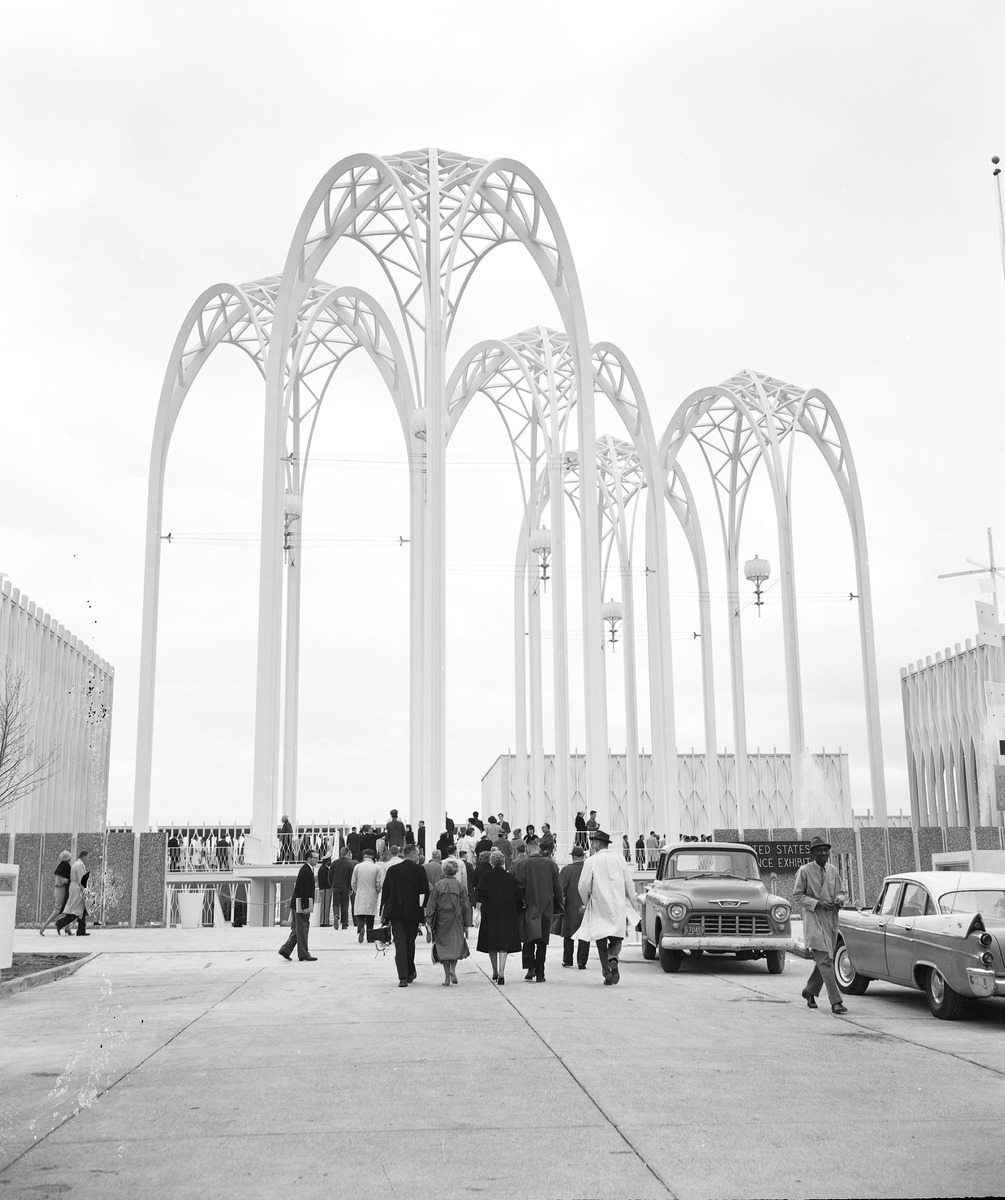
The United States Science Pavilion, "a virtual cathedral of science".

The World of Science centered on the United States Science Exhibit. It also included a NASA Exhibit that included models and mockups of various satellites, as well as the Project Mercury capsule that had carried Alan Shepard into space. These exhibits were the federal government's major contribution to the fair.

The United States Science Exhibit began with Charles Eames' 10-minute short film The House of Science, followed by an exhibit on the development of science, ranging from mathematics and astronomy to atomic science and genetics. The Spacearium held up to 750 people at a time for a simulated voyage first through the Solar System and then through the Milky Way Galaxy and beyond. Further exhibits presented the scientific method and the "horizons of science". This last looked at "Science and the individual", "Control of man's physical surroundings", "Science and the problem of world population", and "Man's concept of his place in an increasingly technological world".

=== World of Century 21 ===
The Washington State Coliseum, financed by the state of Washington, was one of Thiry's own architectural contributions to the fairgrounds. His original conception had been staging the entire fair under a single giant air-conditioned tent-like structure, "a city of its own", but there were neither the budgets nor the tight agreements on concept to realize that vision. In the end, he got exactly enough of a budget to design and build a 160,000-square-foot (15,000 m^{2}) building suitable to hold a variety of exhibition spaces and equally suitable for later conversion to a sports arena and convention facility.

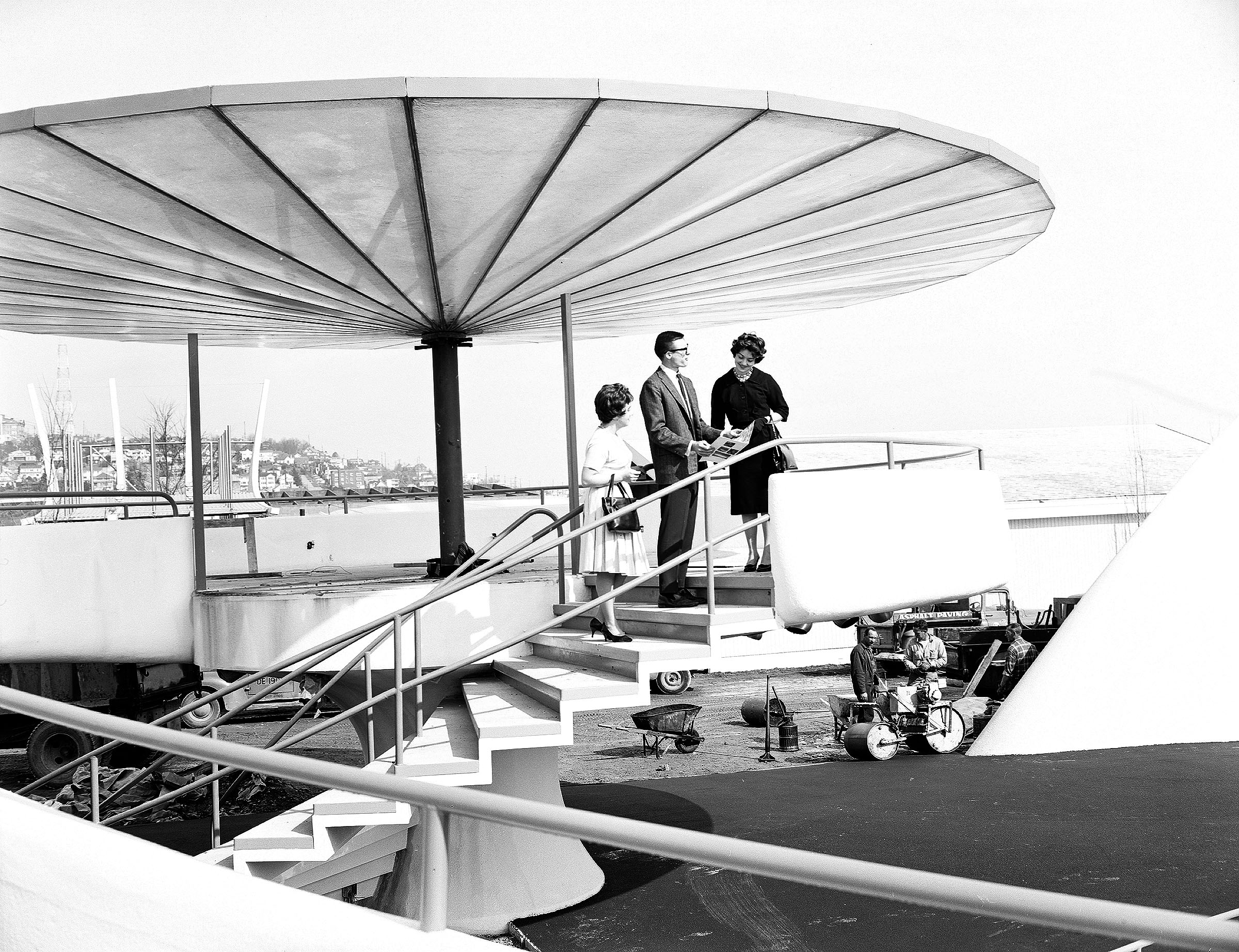
Pavilion of Electric Power

During the festival, the building hosted several exhibits. Nearly half of its surface area was occupied by the state's own circular exhibit "Century 21—The Threshold and the Threat", also known as the "World of Tomorrow" exhibit, billed as a "21-minute tour of the future". The building also housed exhibits by France, Pan American World Airways (Pan Am), General Motors (GM), the American Library Association (ALA), and RCA, as well as a Washington state tourist center.

In "The Threshold and the Threat", visitors rode a "Bubbleator" into the "world of tomorrow". Music "from another world" and a shifting pattern of lights accompanied them on a 40-second upward journey to a starry space bathed in golden light. Then they were faced briefly with an image of a desperate family in a fallout shelter, which vanished and was replaced by a series of images reflecting the sweep of history, starting with the Acropolis and ending with an image of Marilyn Monroe.

Next, visitors were beckoned into a cluster of cubes containing a model of a "city of the future" (which a few landmarks clearly indicated as Seattle) and its suburban and rural surroundings, seen first by day and later by night. The next cluster of cubes zoomed in on a vision of a high-tech, future home in a sylvan setting (and a commuter gyrocopter); a series of projections contrasted this "best of the future" to "the worst of the present" (over-uniform suburbs, a dreary urban housing project).

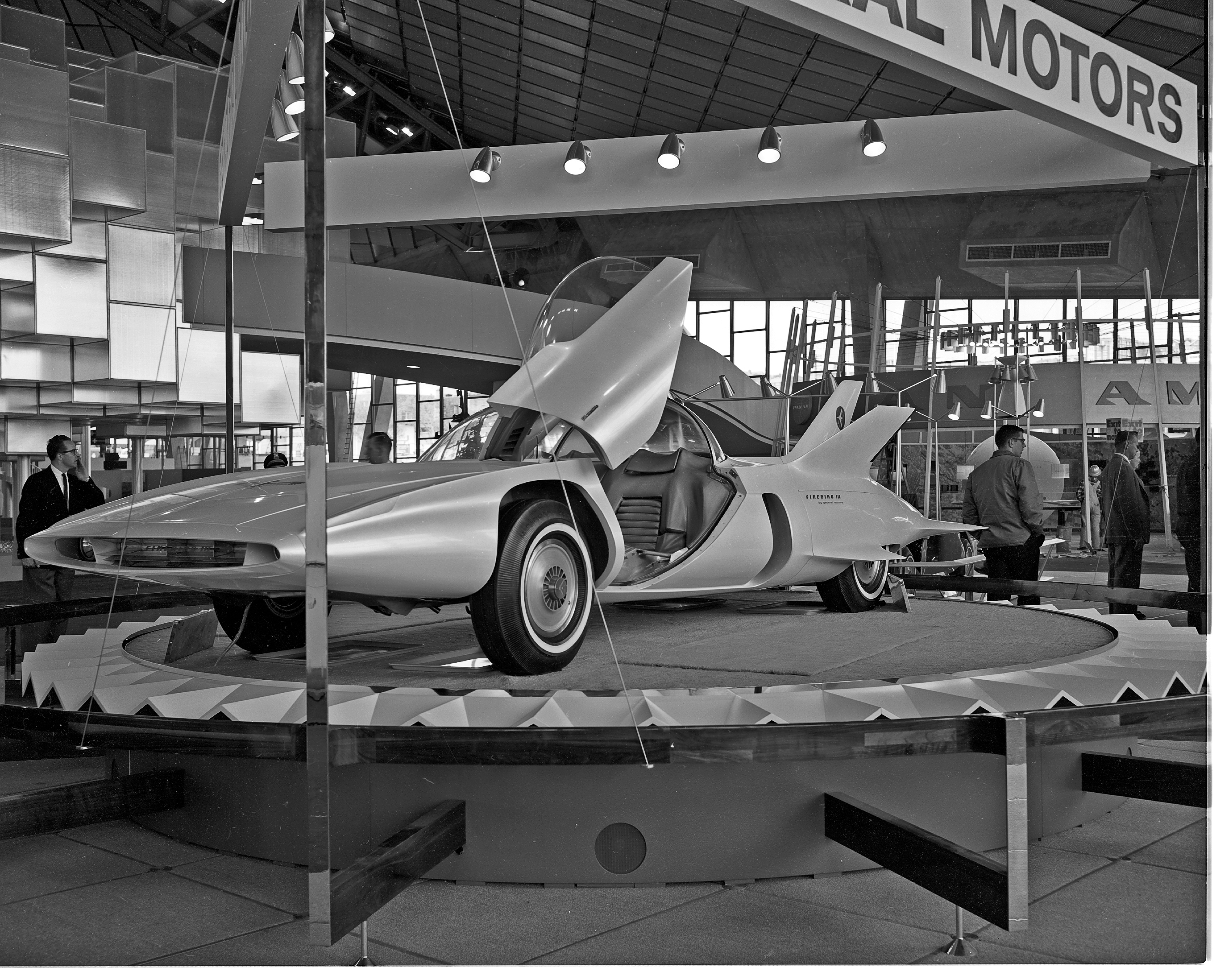
GM's Firebird III

The exhibit continued with a vision of future transportation (centered on a monorail and high-speed "air cars" on an electrically controlled highway). There was also an "office of the future", a climate-controlled "farm factory", an automated offshore kelp and plankton harvesting farm, a vision of the schools of the future with "electronic storehouses of knowledge", and a vision of the many recreations that technology would free humans to pursue.

Finally, the tour ended with a symbolic sculptural tree and the reappearance of the family in the fallout shelter and the sound of a ticking clock, a brief silence, an extract from President Kennedy's Inaugural Address, followed by a further "symphony of music and color".

Under the same roof, the ALA exhibited a "library of the future" (centered on a Univac computer). GM exhibited its vision for highways and vehicles of the future (the latter including the Firebird III). Pan Am exhibited a giant globe that emphasized the notion that we had come to be able to think of distances between major world cities in hours and minutes rather than in terms of chancy voyages over great distances. RCA (which produced "The Threshold and the Threat") exhibited television, radio, and stereo technology, as well as its involvement in space. The French government had an exhibit with its own take on technological progress. Finally, a Washington state tourist center provided information for fair-goers wishing to tour the state.

=== World of Commerce and Industry ===
The World of Commerce and Industry was divided into domestic and foreign areas. The former was sited mainly south of American Way (the continuation of Thomas Street through the grounds), an area it shared with the World of Science. It included the Space Needle and what is now the Broad Street Green and Mural Amphitheater. The Hall of Industry and some smaller buildings were immediately north of American Way. The latter included 15 governmental exhibitors and surrounded the World of Tomorrow and extended to the north edge of the fair.

Among the features of Domestic Commerce and Industry, the massive Interiors, Fashion, and Commerce Building spread for 500 feet (150 m)—nearly the entire Broad Street side of the grounds—with exhibits ranging from 32 separate furniture companies to the Encyclopædia Britannica. Vogue produced four fashion shows daily alongside a perfumed pool. The Ford Motor Company, in its pavilion, presented a simulated space flight and its vision for the car of the future, the Ford Seattle-ite XXI. The Electric Power Pavilion included a 40 feet (12 m)-high fountain made to look like a hydroelectric dam, with the entrance to the pavilion through a tunnel in said "dam". The Forest Products Pavilion was surrounded by a grove of trees of various species, and included an all-wood theater and a Society of American Foresters exhibit. Standard Oil of California celebrated, among other things, the fact that the world's first service station opened in Seattle in 1907. The fair's Bell Telephone (now AT&T Inc.) exhibit was featured in a short film called "Century 21 Calling...", which was later shown on Mystery Science Theater 3000. There were also several religious pavilions. Near the center of all this was Seattle artist Paul Horiuchi's massive mosaic mural, the region's largest work of art at the time, which now forms the backdrop of Seattle Center's Mural Amphitheater.

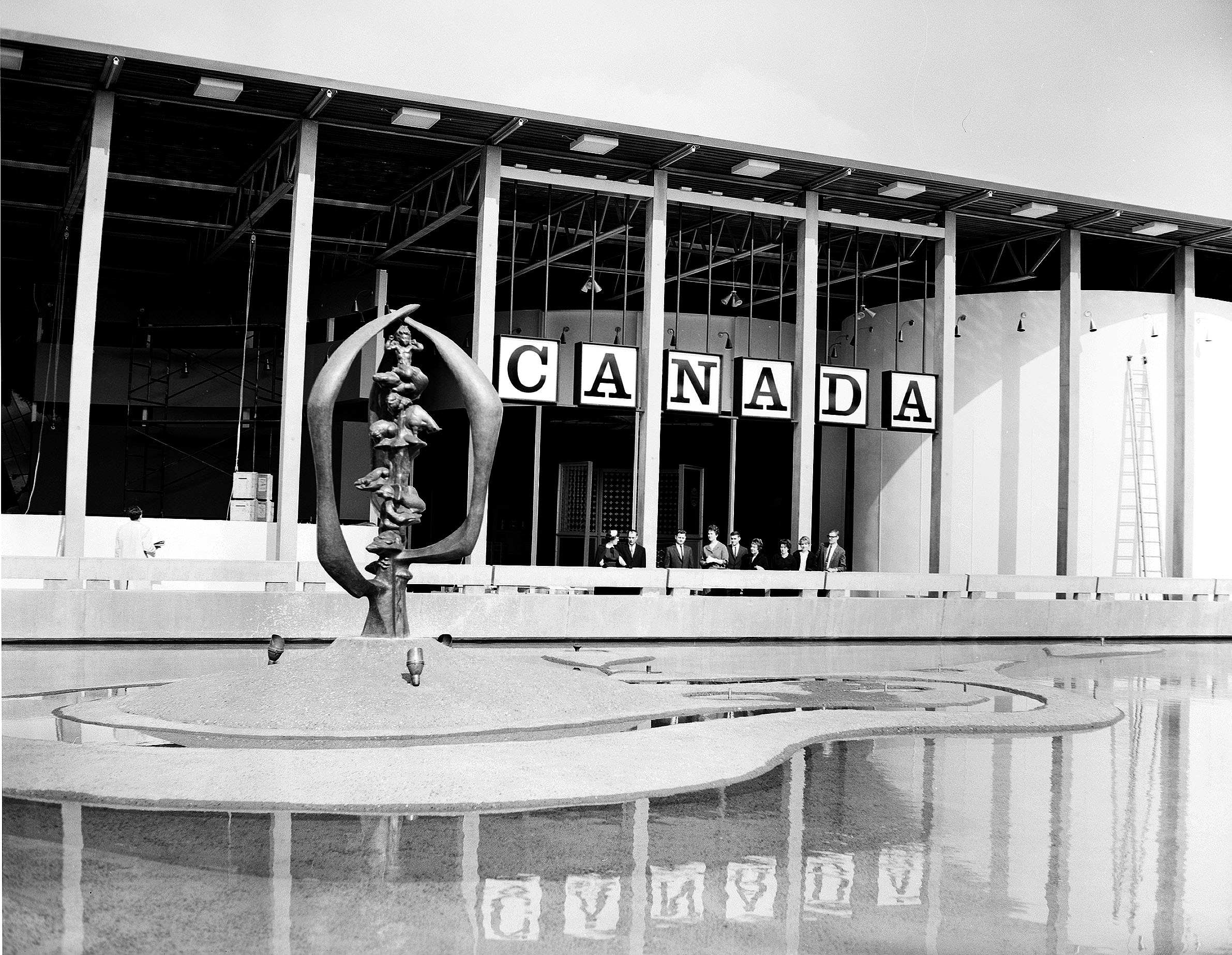
DuPen Fountain and the Canada Building

Foreign exhibits included a science and technology exhibit by Great Britain, while Mexico and Peru focused on handicrafts, and Japan and India attempted to show both of these sides of their national cultures. The Taiwan and South Korea pavilions showed their rapid industrialization to the world and the benefits of capitalism over communism during the time of cold war era. Other pavilions included one featuring Brazilian tea and coffee; a European Communities Pavilion from the then six countries of the European Economic Community; and a joint pavilion by those countries of Africa that had by then achieved independence. Sweden's exhibit included the story of the salvaging of a 17th-century man-of-war from Stockholm harbor, and San Marino's exhibit featured its postage stamps and pottery. Near the center of this was the DuPen Fountain featuring three sculptures by Seattle artist Everett DuPen.

=== World of Art ===
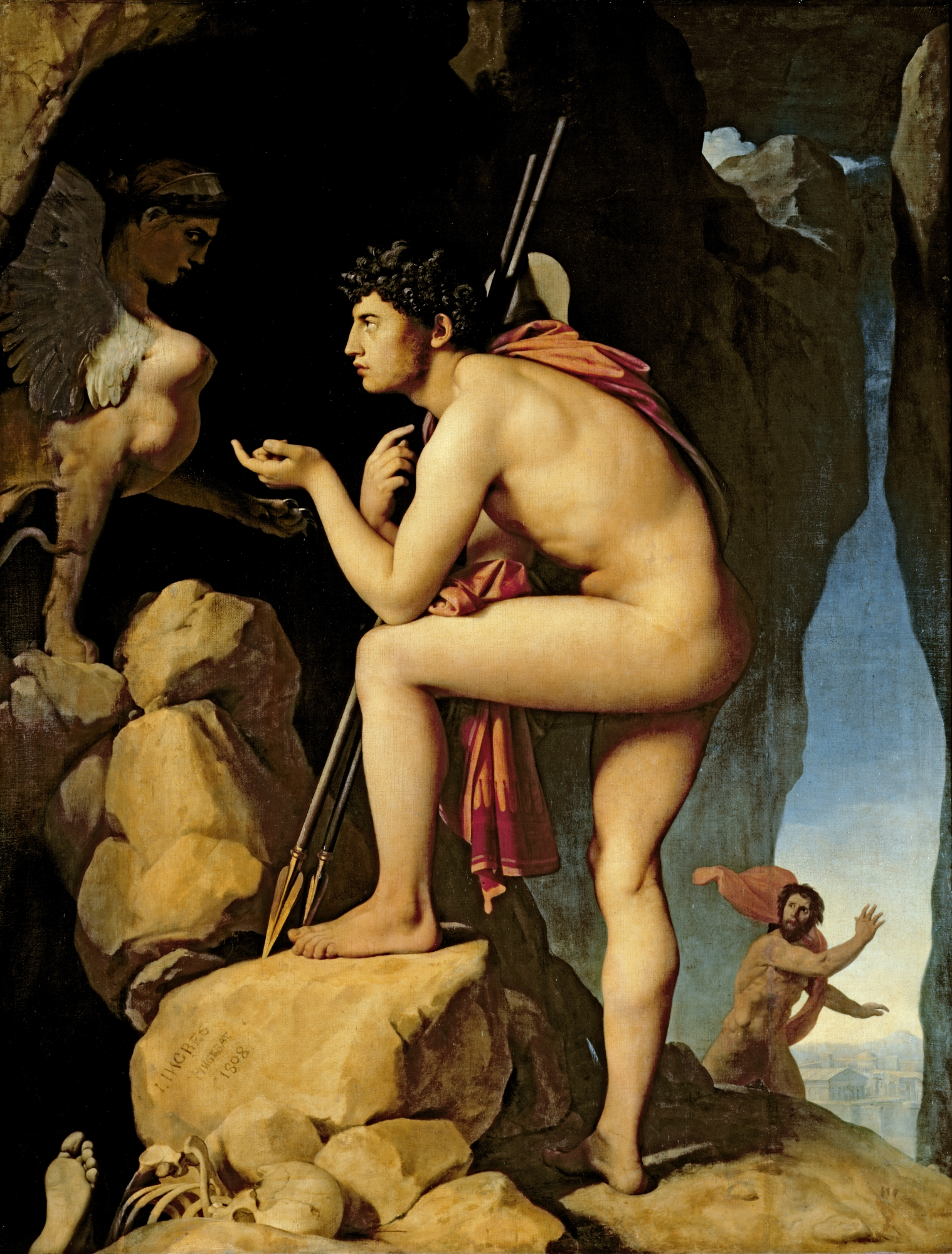
Ingres' Oedipus and the Sphinx was among the works displayed in the Fine Arts Pavilion.

The Fine Arts Pavilion (later the Exhibition Hall) brought together an art exhibition unprecedented for the West Coast of the United States. Among the 50 contemporary American painters whose works shown were Josef Albers, Willem de Kooning, Helen Frankenthaler, Philip Guston, Jasper Johns, Joan Mitchell, Robert Motherwell, Georgia O'Keeffe, Jackson Pollock, Robert Rauschenberg, Ad Reinhardt, Ben Shahn, and Frank Stella, as well as Northwest painters Kenneth Callahan, Morris Graves, Paul Horiuchi, and Mark Tobey. American sculptors included Leonard Baskin, Alexander Calder, Joseph Cornell, Louise Nevelson, Isamu Noguchi, and 19 others. The 50 international contemporary artists represented included the likes of painters Fritz Hundertwasser, Joan Miró, Antoni Tàpies, and Francis Bacon, and sculptors Henry Moore and Jean Arp. In addition, there were exhibitions of Mark Tobey's paintings and of Asian art, drawn from the collections of the Seattle Art Museum; and an additional exhibition of 72 "masterpieces" ranging from Titian, El Greco, Caravaggio, Rembrandt, and Rubens through Toulouse-Lautrec, Monet, and Turner to Klee, Braque, and Picasso, with no shortage of other comparably famous artists represented.

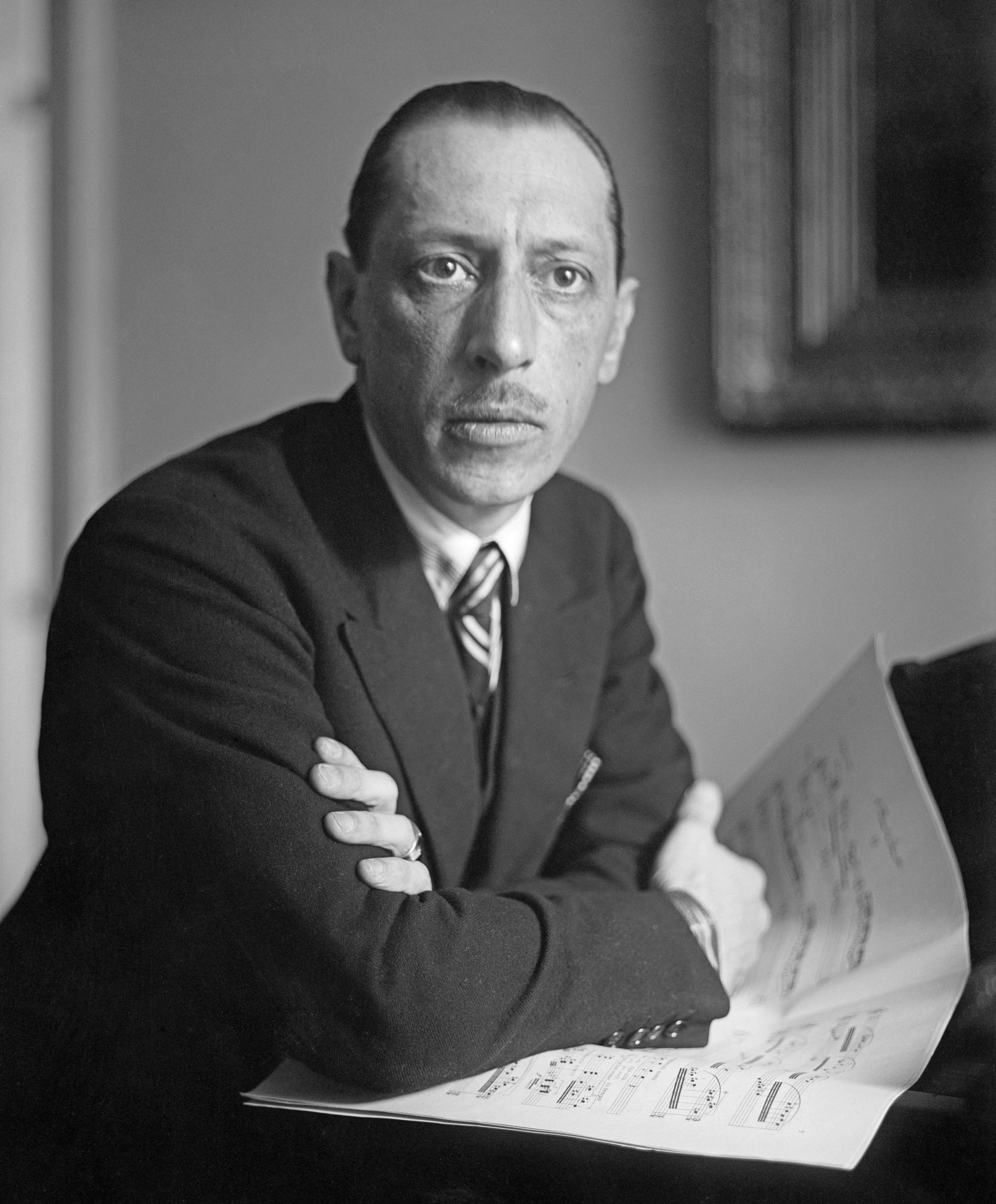
Igor Stravinsky

A separate gallery presented Northwest Coast Indian art, and featured a series of large paintings by Bill Holm introducing Northwest Native motifs.

=== World of Entertainment ===
A US$15 million performing-arts program at the fair ranged from a boxing championship to an international twirling competition but with no shortage of nationally and internationally famous performers, especially at the new Opera House and Playhouse. After the fair, the Playhouse became the Seattle Repertory Theatre; in the mid-1980s it became the Intiman Playhouse. When the Intiman Theatre became financially unstable, Cornish College of the Arts took over the lease from the city of Seattle, and now operates it as the Cornish Playhouse at Seattle Center.

==== Opera House performances ====
Scheduled groups performing at the Opera House included: Source:

Date (all dates are 1962)	Act
April 21	Opening Night: Seattle Symphony Orchestra conducted by guest conductor Igor Stravinsky with Van Cliburn as a guest soloist
April 22–25	The Ed Sullivan Show, live telecasts
April 20 – May 5	Dunninger the Mentalist
May 6	The Littlest Circus
May 8–12	The San Francisco Ballet
May 13	Science Fiction Panel including Ray Bradbury and Rod Serling
May 15–16	Seattle Symphony Orchestra conducted by Milton Katims, with guest soloists Isaac Stern, Adele Addison, and Albert DaCosta
May 17–19	Victor Borge
May 22	Theodore Bikel
May 24–25	The Philadelphia Orchestra conducted by Eugene Ormandy
May 29 – June 3	The Old Vic Company (Shakespeare performances)
June 7, June 9, June 11	Seattle Symphony production of Verdi's Aida, featuring Gloria Davy, Sandor Konya, Irene Dalis, Robert Merrill, and Jan Rubeš
June 10	Josh White
June 17	Norwegian Chorus and Dancers
June 18–19	Ukrainian State Dance Company (U.S. premiere)
June 22–23	International Gospel Quartets
July 8	SPEBSQSA Barbershop Quartet Song Fest
July 9–14	Bayanihan Dancers of the Philippines
July 24 – August 4	New York City Ballet Company
August 27 – September 2	Ballet Folklorico de Mexico
September 10	CBC Vancouver Chamber Orchestra
September 18–23	D'Oyly Carte Opera Company (Gilbert and Sullivan operettas)
September 25–30	Rapsodia Romîna: Romanian National Folk Ensemble and Barbu Lăutaru Orchestra of Bucharest (U.S. premiere)
October 2–7	Uday Shankar Dancers
October 8–13	Foo-Hsing Theater (Republic of China), youth Chinese opera
October 14	U.S. Marine Corps Band
October 16–17	Seattle Symphony Orchestra conducted by Milton Katims, world premiere of new work by Gerald Kechley

==== Other performances ====
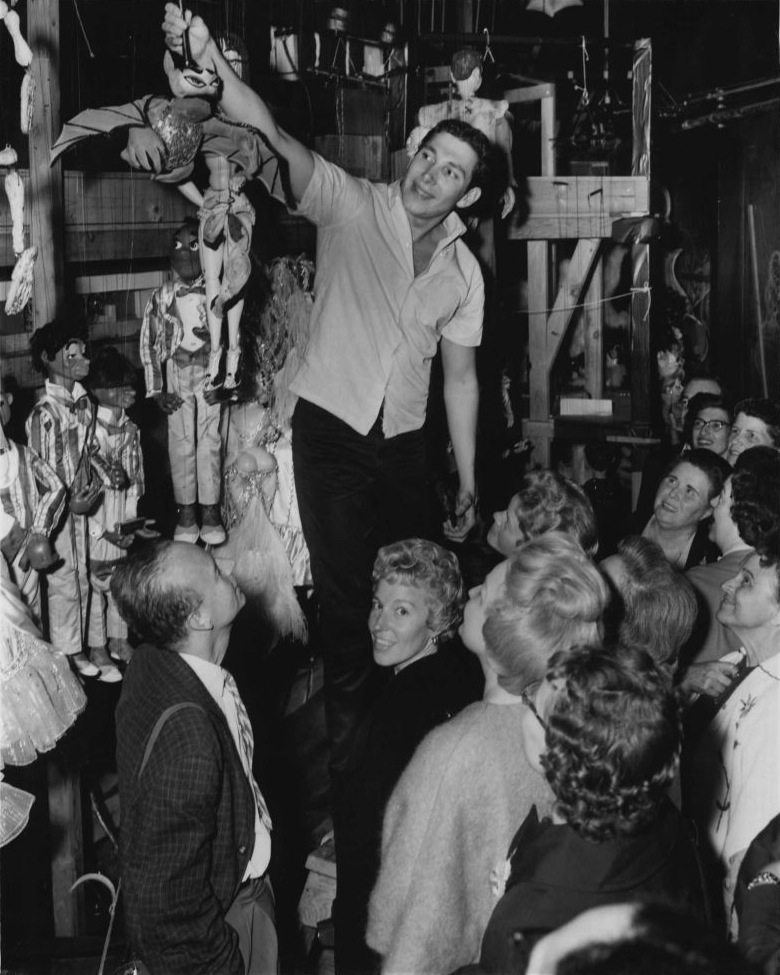
Marty Krofft displays the puppets of Les Poupées de Paris backstage

Events and performances at the Playhouse included Sweden's Royal Dramatic Theatre; a chamber music performance by Isaac Stern, Milton Katims, Leonard Rose, Eugene Istomin, the Claiborne Brothers gospel quartet, and the Juilliard String Quartet; two appearances by newsman Edward R. Murrow; Bunraku theater; Richard Dyer-Bennet; Hal Holbrook's solo show as Mark Twain; the Count Basie and Benny Goodman jazz orchestras; Lawrence Welk; Nat King Cole; and Ella Fitzgerald. Also during the fair, Memorial Stadium hosted the Ringling Brothers Circus, Tommy Bartlett's Water Ski Sky and Stage Show, Roy Rogers and Dale Evans' Western Show, and an appearance by evangelist Billy Graham.

The fair and the city were the setting of the Elvis Presley movie It Happened at the World's Fair (1963), with a young Kurt Russell making his first screen appearance. Location shooting began on September 4 and concluded nearly two weeks later. The film would be released the following spring, long after the fair had ended.

=== Show Street ===
At the northeast corner of the grounds (now the KCTS-TV studios), Show Street was the "adult entertainment" portion of the fair. Attractions included Gracie Hansen's Paradise International (a Vegas-style floor show (rivalled next door by LeRoy Prinz's "Backstage USA")), Sid and Marty Krofft's adults-only puppet show, Les Poupées de Paris, and (briefly, until it was shut down) a show featuring naked "Girls of the Galaxy". Tamer entertainment came in forms such as the Paris Spectacular wax museum, an elaborate Japanese Village, and the Hawaiian Pavilion.

=== Other sections of the fair ===
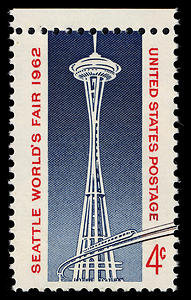
A commemorative postage stamp

Gayway
The Gayway was a small amusement park; after the fair it became the Fun Forest. It included such rides as the Flight to Mars, a dark amusement ride themed around space pirates on Mars, decorated with black lights and glow paint. In 2011, the Fun Forest was shut down and the Chihuly Garden and Glass opened in its place.
Boulevards of the World
Boulevards of the World was "the shopping center of the fair". It also included the Plaza of the States and the original version of the International Fountain.
Exhibit Fair
The Exhibit Fair provided another shopping district under the north stands of Memorial Stadium.
Food and Favors
"Food and Favors", officially one of the "areas" of the fair, simply encompassed the various restaurants, food stands, etc., scattered throughout the grounds. These ranged from vending machines and food stands to the Eye of the Needle (atop the Space Needle) and the private Century 21 Club.
Food Circus
The Food Circus was a food court in the former armory, later named the Center House, and renamed the Armory in 2012 as a remodel of the building continues. Unlike the current arrangement with a stage and a large open space for dancing, events, and temporary booths, many food booths were in the middle of the room as well as at the edges. There were 52 concessionaires in all, nine of them with exhibits in addition to their food for sale. Beginning in 1963, the Food Circus also housed a variety of museums, including Jones' Fantastic Show, the Jules Charbneau World of Miniatures, and the Pullen Klondike Museum.

== See also ==
- List of world expositions
- List of world's fairs
