= Moms Mabley =

American comedian and actress (1897–1975)

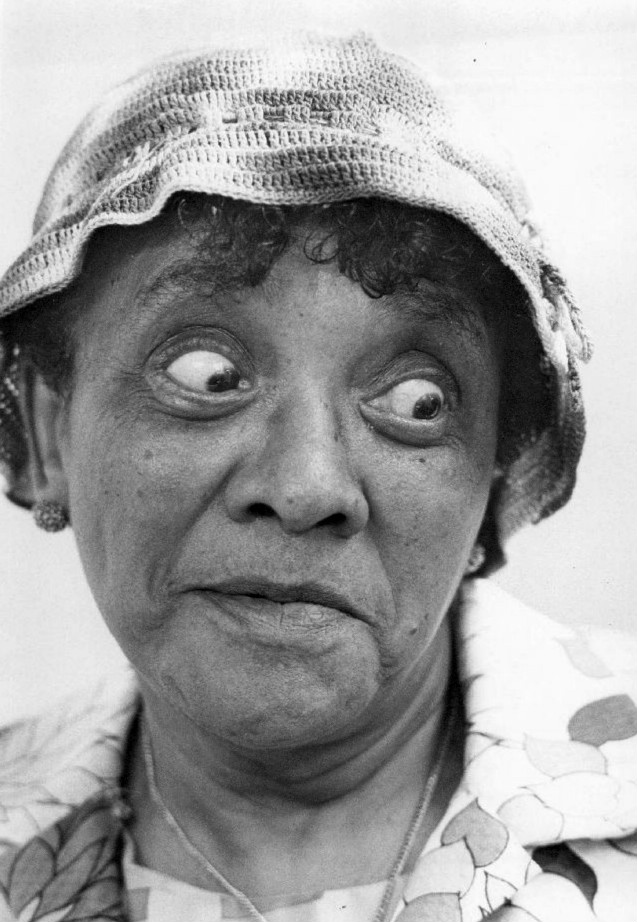
- Mabley during an appearance on The Smothers Brothers Comedy Hour in 1968
- Born: Loretta Mary Aiken; March 19, 1897; Brevard, North Carolina, U.S.
- Died: May 23, 1975 (aged 78); White Plains, New York, U.S.

Comedy career
- Years active: 1919–1975
- Medium: Vaudeville; television; stand-up; film
- Genre: Social satire

Loretta Mary Aiken (March 19, 1897 – May 23, 1975), known by her stage name Moms Mabley, was an American stand-up comedian and actress. Mabley began her career on the theater stage in the 1920s and became a veteran entertainer of the Chitlin' Circuit of black vaudeville. Mabley later recorded comedy albums and appeared in films and on television programs including The Ed Sullivan Show and The Smothers Brothers Comedy Hour.

== Early life ==
Loretta Mary Aiken was born in Brevard, North Carolina, United States. She was one of 16 children born to James Aiken and Mary Smith, who had married in 1891. Her father owned and operated several successful businesses, and took in boarders.

Her childhood was tumultuous. Aiken reportedly gave birth to two children resulting from being raped before the age of 14. The first time was at age 11 by an elderly black man. The second time was at age 13 and by a white sheriff. Both her children were placed for adoption.

== Career ==
=== Early career ===
At the encouragement of her grandmother, Aiken ran away at the age of 14 to Cleveland, Ohio, joining a traveling vaudeville-style minstrel show starring Butterbeans and Susie, where she sang and entertained. In 1909, a year after Aiken left, her father was killed when a fire engine exploded while he was volunteering as a firefighter. Her mother took over the family's primary business, a general store. She was killed a few years later, run over by a truck while returning home from church on Christmas Day.

Told by her brother she "was a disgrace to the Aiken name because ... stage women wasn't nothing but prostitutes", Aiken adopted the stage name Jackie Mabley from her first boyfriend, who was also a performer. She remarked in a 1970 Ebony interview that he had taken so much from her, the least she could do was take his name from him.

=== Rise to fame ===
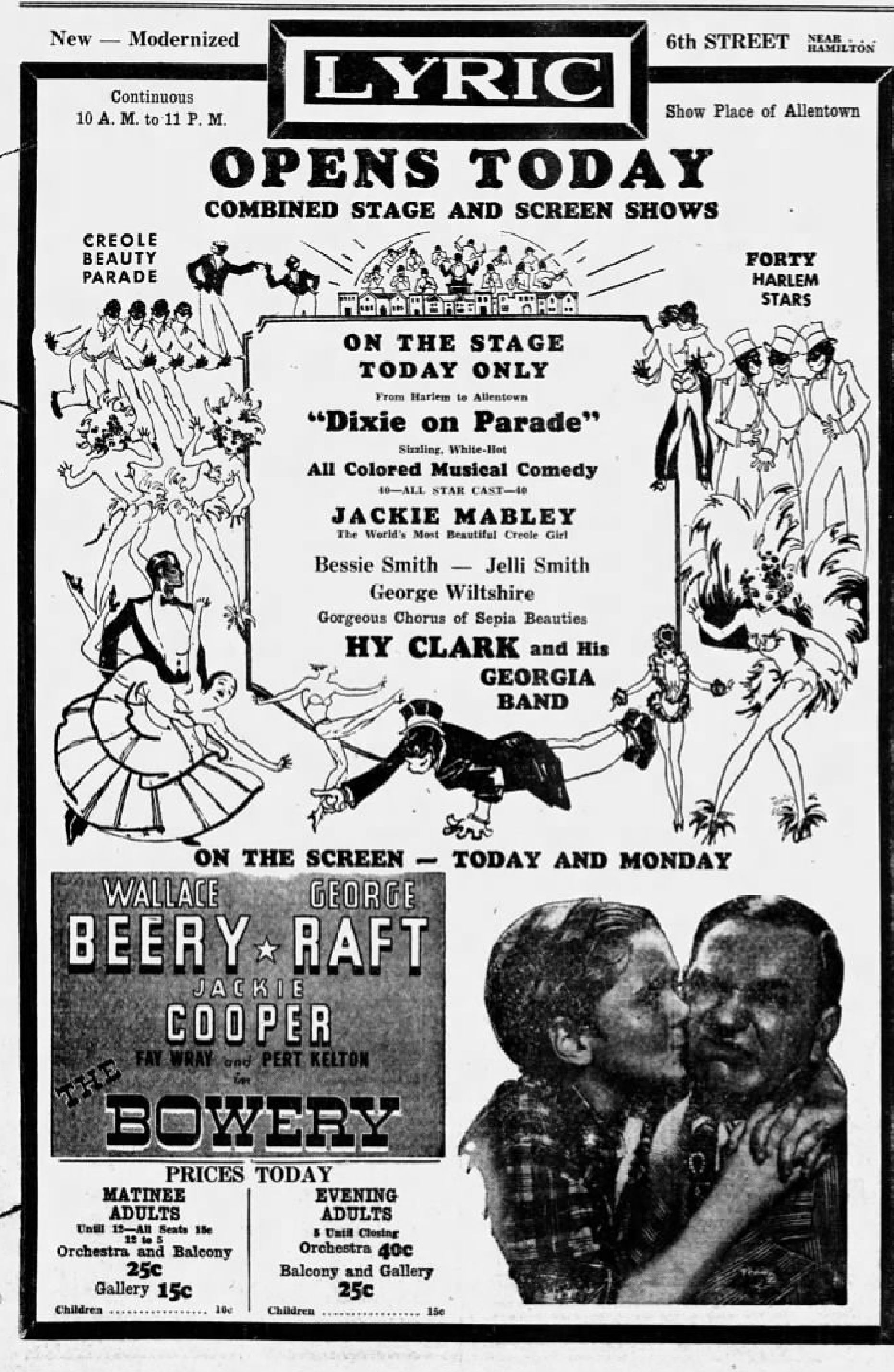
1933 Chitlin' Circuit theatre ad billing Jackie Mabley as "The World's Most Beautiful Creole Girl"

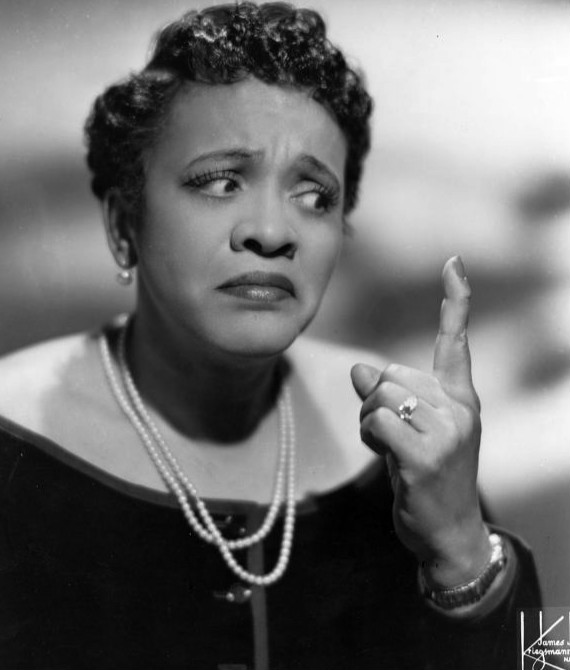
Mabley in 1944

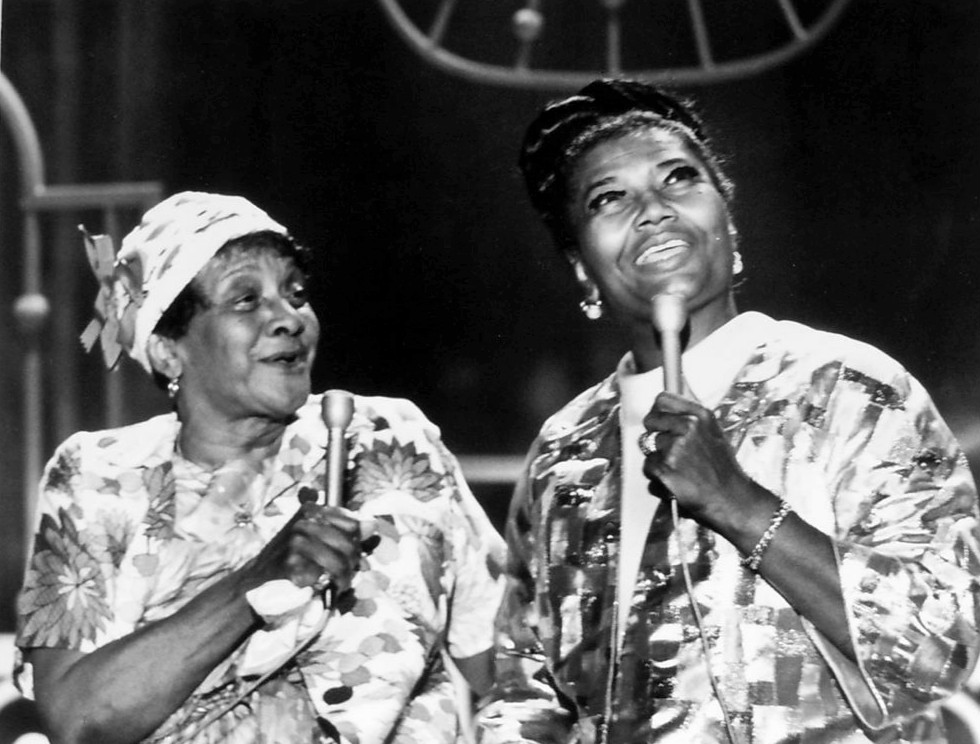
Mabley with Pearl Bailey on The Pearl Bailey Show in 1971

Mabley quickly became one of the most successful entertainers of the Chitlin' Circuit, although, as a black woman, her wages were meager. She made her New York City debut at Connie's Inn in Harlem.

She came out as a lesbian in 1921 at the age of twenty-seven, becoming one of the first openly gay comedians. During the 1920s and 1930s she appeared in androgynous clothing and recorded several "lesbian stand-up" routines.

In April 1939, Mabley became the first female comic to perform at the Apollo Theater in Harlem.

During the 1950s, Mabley—influenced by the maternal role she was filling for other comedians on the circuit—adopted the name "Moms" and the appearance of a toothless, bedraggled woman in a house dress and floppy hat. Mabley also credited the name to her grandmother, who had been a driving force in the pursuit of her dreams. The non-threatening persona aided her in addressing topics too edgy for most comics of the time, including racism, sexuality and having children after becoming a widow. A preference for handsome young men rather than "old washed-up geezers" became a signature bit.

In the 1960s, Mabley became known to a wider white audience, playing Carnegie Hall in 1962, and making a number of mainstream TV appearances, with multiple appearances on The Smothers Brothers Comedy Hour. Music became a regular part of her act, and a cover version of "Abraham, Martin and John" hit No. 35 on the Billboard Hot 100 on July 19, 1969, thought to make Mabley, at a presumed age of 75, to be the oldest living person to have a U.S. Top 40 hit, until some sources claimed her birth year to be 1897, and, in any event, Brenda Lee took the title at the age of 78 in December 2023. Mabley played the Harlem Cultural Festival during that time.

=== Final years ===
Mabley continued performing in the 1970s. In 1971, she appeared on The Pearl Bailey Show. Later that year, she opened for Ike & Tina Turner at the Greek Theatre and sang a tribute to Louis Armstrong as part of her set. While filming the 1974 film Amazing Grace, her only film-starring role, Mabley suffered a heart attack. She returned to work three weeks later, after receiving a pacemaker.

== Personal life and death ==
Over the course of her life, Mabley had six children: Bonnie, Christine, Charles, and Yvonne Ailey, and two placed for adoption when she was a child.

Mabley died from heart failure in White Plains, New York, on May 23, 1975. She is interred at Ferncliff Cemetery, Hartsdale, New York.

== Legacy ==
In 1983 and 1984, Whoopi Goldberg "first came to national prominence with her one-woman show" in which she portrayed Mabley, Moms, first performed in Berkeley, California, and then at the Victoria Theatre in San Francisco; the Oakland Museum of California preserves a poster advertising the show. Mabley was the subject of Whoopi Goldberg Presents Moms Mabley, a documentary film that first aired on HBO on November 18, 2013. The documentary was nominated for two Creative Arts Emmy Awards at the 66th ceremony held on August 16, 2014, at the Nokia Theatre in Downtown Los Angeles: Outstanding Documentary or Nonfiction Special and Outstanding Narrator for Whoopi Goldberg. In 2015, she was named by Equality Forum as one of their 31 Icons of the 2015 LGBT History Month.

Mabley was featured during the "HerStory" video tribute to notable women on U2's tour in 2017 for the 30th anniversary of The Joshua Tree during a performance of "Ultraviolet (Light My Way)" from the band's 1991 album Achtung Baby.

Mabley, portrayed by Wanda Sykes, appears in the final episode of the third season of The Marvelous Mrs. Maisel, performing a full stand-up routine on the Apollo Theater stage.

The street in Brevard where Mabley grew up was named for her in 1997 for her 100th birthday, but changed back due to complaints. In 2023, a North Carolina historical marker honored her.

== Work ==
Stage

- Bowman's Cotton Blossoms (1919)
- Look Who's Here (1927)
- Miss Bandana (1927)
- Fast and Furious (1931)
- Blackberries of 1932 (1932)
- The Joy Boat (1930s)
- Sidewalks of Harlem (1930s)
- Red Pastures (1930s)
- Swingin' the Dream (1939)

Films

- The Emperor Jones (1933)
- Killer Diller (1948)
- Boarding House Blues (1948)
- It's Your Thing (documentary, 1970)
- Amazing Grace (1974)

Television

- The Smothers Brothers Comedy Hour (1967)
- The Ed Sullivan Show (1969)
- The Merv Griffin Show (with guest host Judy Garland, 1969)
- The Bill Cosby Show (1970)
- The Pearl Bailey Show (1971)
- The Mike Douglas Show (1972)

Discography

- 1961: On Stage
- 1961: Moms Mabley at the "UN"
- 1961: Moms Mabley at The Playboy Club
- 1962: Moms Mabley Breaks It Up
- 1962: Moms Mabley at Geneva Conference
- 1963: I Got Somethin' to Tell You!
- 1963: Young Men, Sí – Old Men, No
- 1964: Moms the Word
- 1964: Out on a Limb
- 1964: The Funny Sides of Moms Mabley (Chess)
- 1964: Moms Wows
- 1964: Best of Moms and Pigmeat, Vol. 1
- 1965: Men in My Life
- 1965: Now Hear This
- 1966: Moms Mabley at the White House Conference
- 1968: Best of Moms Mabley
- 1969: Her Young Thing
- 1969: The Youngest Teenager
- 1969: Abraham, Martin & John
- 1969: Live at the Greek Theater
- 1970: Live at Sing Sing
- 1972: I Like 'em Young
- 1994: Live at the Apollo
- 1994: The Funny Sides of Moms Mabley (Jewel)
- 1994: Live at the Ritz
- 2004: Comedy Ain't Pretty
