= Bernard J. Quinn =

American Catholic priest

Servant of God Bernard John Quinn
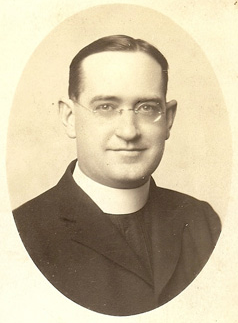
- Bernard John Quinn c. 1930

Personal details
- Born: January 15, 1888 Newark, New Jersey, U.S.
- Died: April 7, 1940 (aged 52) Brooklyn, New York, U.S.

Bernard John Quinn (January 15, 1888 – April 7, 1940) was an American Catholic priest. He is known for his humanitarian work with African-Americans in New York. His cause for canonization was opened in 2008.

== Biography ==
Bernard J. Quinn was born in Newark, New Jersey, to poor Irish immigrants, Bernard and Sarah Quinn.

He entered St. John's Seminary in 1906. He was ordained on June 12, 1912, and was temporarily assigned to several different churches. He served as a chaplain in the 333rd Machine Gun Infantry Regiment during World War I, and he was gassed in France. Following the war, he resumed his pastoral duties in Brooklyn.

In 1922, Quinn established the first church for Black Catholics in Brooklyn, which he had consecrated to St. Peter Claver, which is still in operation and counts among the graduates of its parochial school the civil rights activist and singer Lena Horne. Quinn also included music as part of his ministry. Hundreds of black children joined the church choir, including Horne and Pearl Bailey.

In 1928, he established the diocese's first orphanage for black children, in Wading River.

His humanitarian work was met with opposition from some groups and individuals. In 1929, John L. Belford had written openly in his newsletter against the growing number of African-Americans in the Catholic Church, which was met with strong disagreement from Quinn. Quinn responded, "No church can exclude anyone and still keep its Christian ideals."

The Little Flower House of Providence was burned twice in one year by the Ku Klux Klan, which prompted Quinn to rebuild once again but this time out of more fireproof material, according to a 1929 article in The Brooklyn Daily Eagle with the headline: “New Fireproof Orphanage Will Defy Incendiary.” It later became the base of operations for the Little Flower Children and Family Services of New York, which continues to provide services such as care for adults with developmental disabilities, for those in Brooklyn, Queens, and Long Island.

=== Death ===
In April 1940, he was admitted to St. Mary's Hospital for surgery to treat an abdominal problem. He died of stomach cancer on April 7, 1940, at the age of 52.

== Cause for canonization ==
Quinn's cause for canonization was opened in 2008 by Bishop Nicholas DiMarzio of Brooklyn, granting Quinn the title "Servant of God". The next step, following a Vatican investigation commenced in 2019, would be for him to be declared "Venerable" by the pope. He is currently a candidate for sainthood, which if successful would make him the first person from Brooklyn to be canonized by the Catholic Church.
