= Bubbleator =

Transparent hydraulic elevator at the 1962 World's Fair

Coordinates: 47.344677°N 122.328542°W

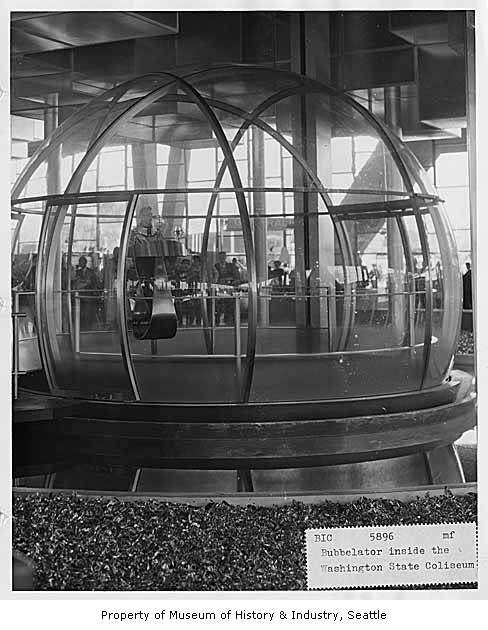
"Empty - the bubbleator descends for another 100 passengers to the World of Tomorrow in the center of the Washington State Coliseum. On its return trip to the twenty-first century the modernistic elevator rises in a glow of gold light while passing through shimmering reflections from the rainbow of the future world." Here, the Bubbleator rises to the upper floor of the Washington State Coliseum, now Climate Pledge Arena.

The Bubbleator was a large, bubble-shaped hydraulic elevator with transparent acrylic glass walls operated from an elevated chair built for the 1962 World's Fair in Seattle. These transparent walls gave the illusion of looking through an actual 'soap bubble' by refracting light to obtain a rainbow-like effect for the riders inside. It was originally part of the Washington State Coliseum (now a sports venue known as Climate Pledge Arena), where it lifted 100 passengers at a time up one floor through a structure of interlocking aluminum cubes to the "World of Tomorrow" exhibit. T. C. Howard of Synergetics, Inc. designed the Bubbleator and the exhibit.

While boarding the Bubbleator, passengers were commanded by an ethereal female voice to "Please move to the rear of the sphere", or the "Martian type" male elevator operator would say, "Step to the rear of the Sphere" in a creepy sci-fi type voice. The soundtrack for the Bubbleator was conducted by Attilio Mineo and released as Man in Space with Sounds.

After the fair, the Bubbleator was relocated to the Center House at Seattle Center. It carried its last passengers on October 1, 1980.

By 1984, the Bubbleator had been removed and put in storage to make way for the Seattle Children's Museum. It was sold to a private owner in Des Moines, Washington, who recycled the upper part of the dome into a greenhouse. The control chair, which had also been in private hands, was donated to the Museum of History and Industry in 2005.
