= Seattle Children's Museum =

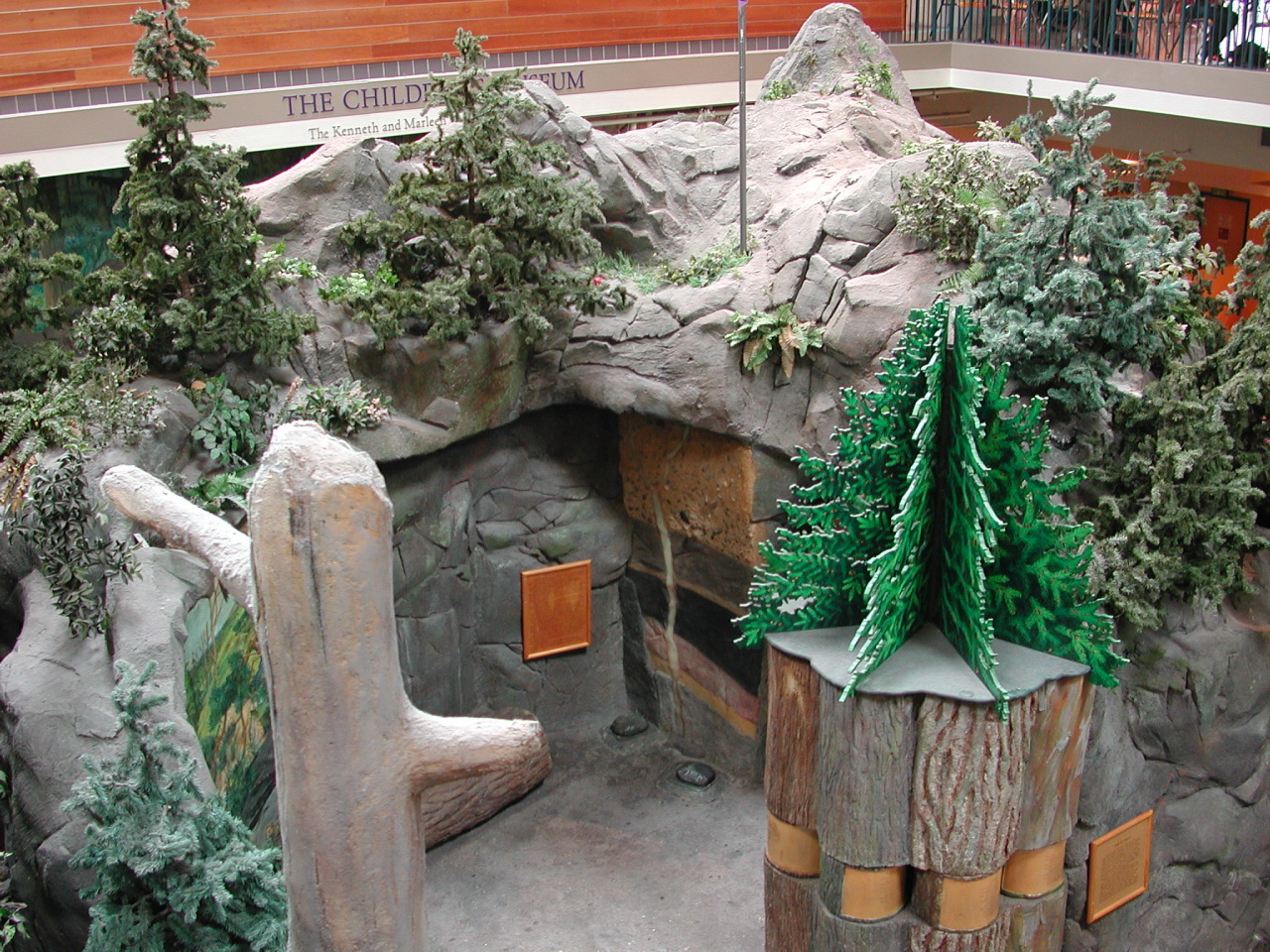
- Mountain exhibit
- Established: 1979
- Location: 305 Harrison Street; Seattle, Washington
- Coordinates: 47°37′17″N 122°21′03″W
- Type: Children's museum
- Website: seattlechildrensmuseum.org

The Seattle Children's Museum in Seattle is located on the lowest floor of the Armory at the Seattle Center. Founded in 1979 with a single exhibit, the museum currently features 18,000 sq feet of play space with 11 exhibits designed for kids 6 months to 8 years. Visitors to the main floor of the Center House can look down into a large open space in the floor which is part of the museum; this was once the site of the bubbleator.

== See also ==
- Children's museum
