= Eltana =

American bagel shop chain

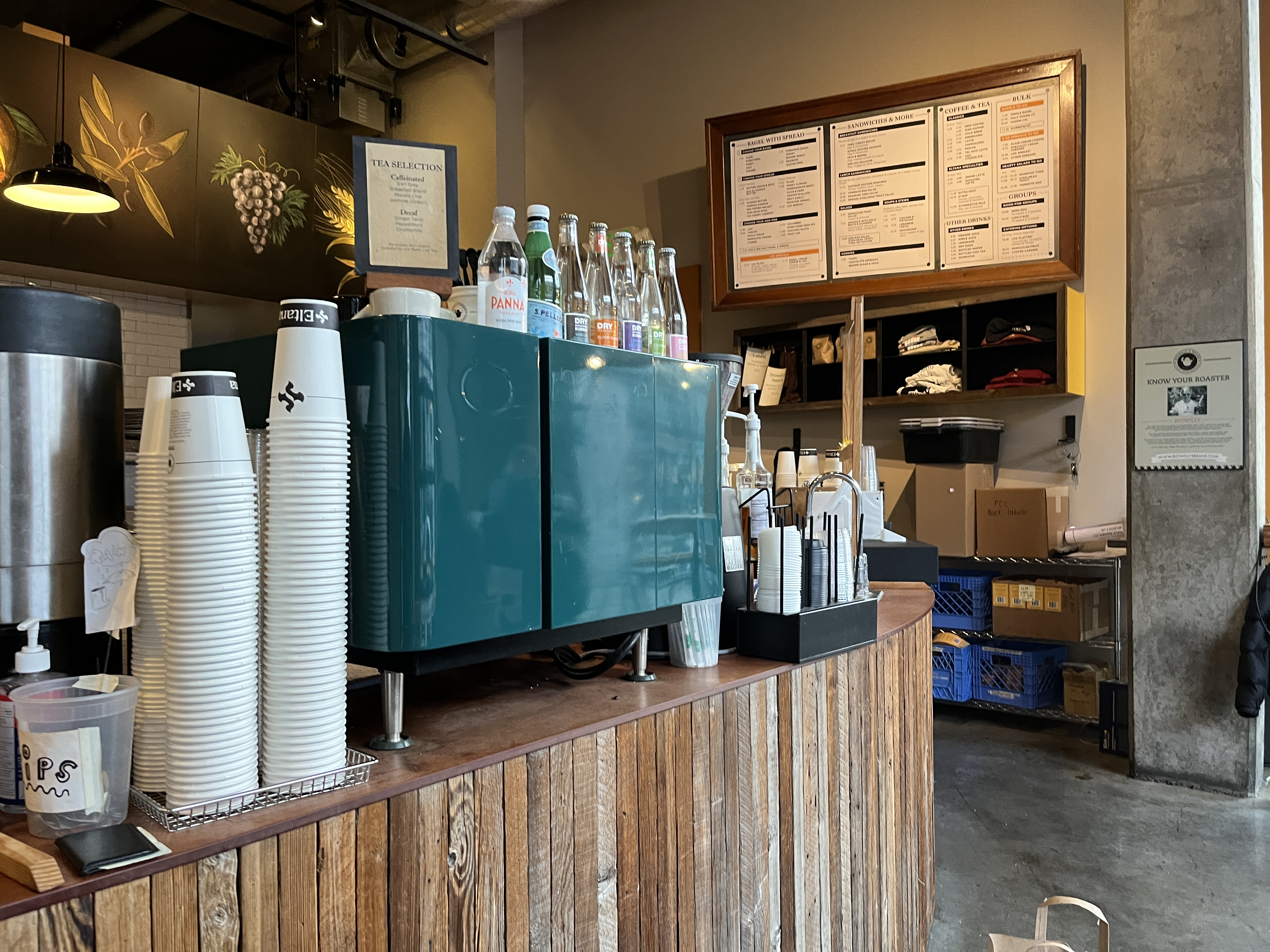
- Interior of the shop on Capitol Hill in Seattle, 2023

Restaurant information
- Website: eltana.com

Eltana is a small chain of Montreal-style bagel shops in Seattle, in the U.S. state of Washington.

== Description ==
Montreal-style bagels are boiled in honey water and baked in a wood-fired oven. Eltana has also served salads, sandwiches, shakshouka, and Eastern Mediterranean / Middle Eastern cuisine.

== History ==
Established in 2010, the business has operated on Capitol Hill, in the Fremont and Wallingford neighborhoods, and in the food court at Seattle Center's Armory in the Queen Anne neighborhood. Eltana has also operated in Japan.

== Reception ==
Bradley Foster included Eltana in Thrillist's 2013 list of Seattle's eight "sweetest walk-up eat spots". Allecia Vermillion included the business in Seattle Metropolitan's 2022 overview of recommended eateries in Wallingford.

== See also ==
- List of bakeries
- List of coffeehouse chains
- List of restaurant chains in the United States
