= Les Poupées de Paris =

- Les Poupées de Paris soundtrack album
- Music: Jimmy Van Heusen
- Lyrics: Sammy Cahn

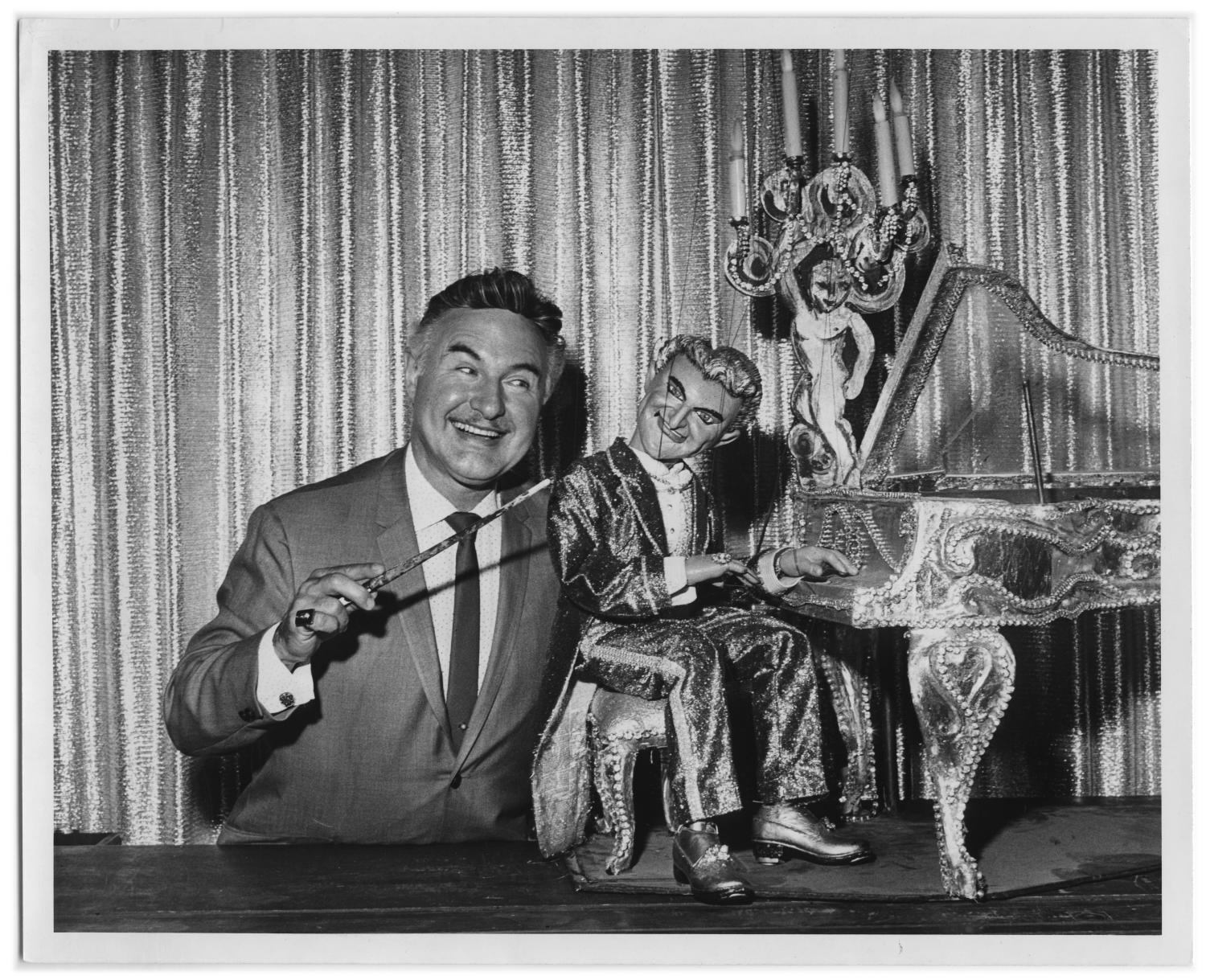
Sid Krofft with the Liberace puppet from the show

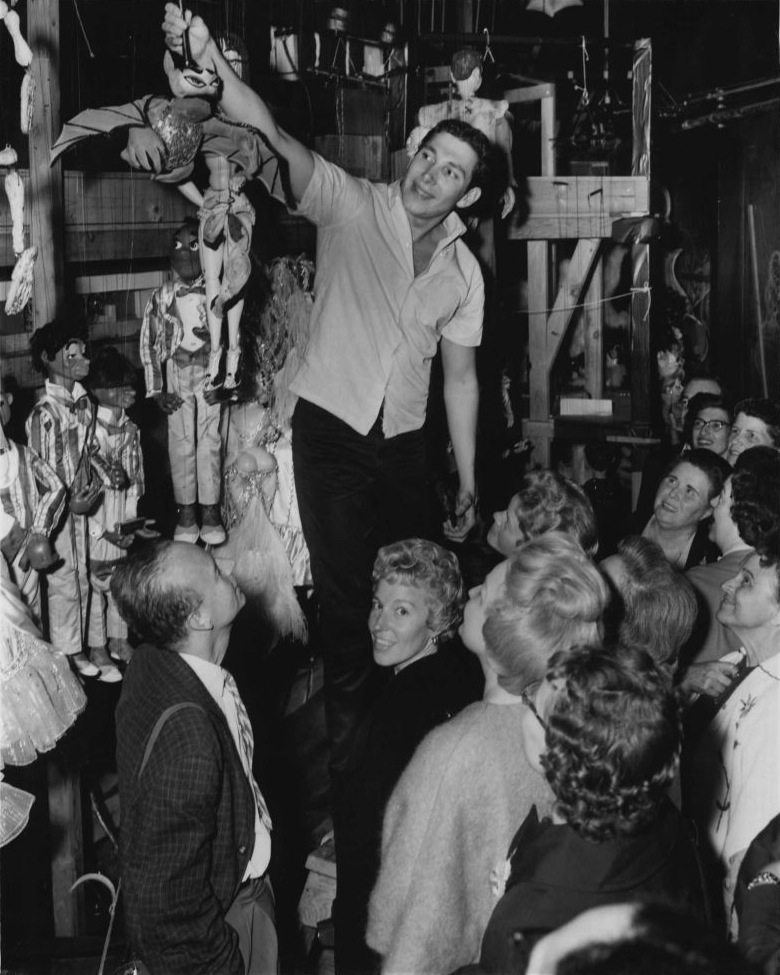
Marty Krofft displaying some of the marionettes of Les Poupées de Paris backstage at the 1962 Seattle World's Fair

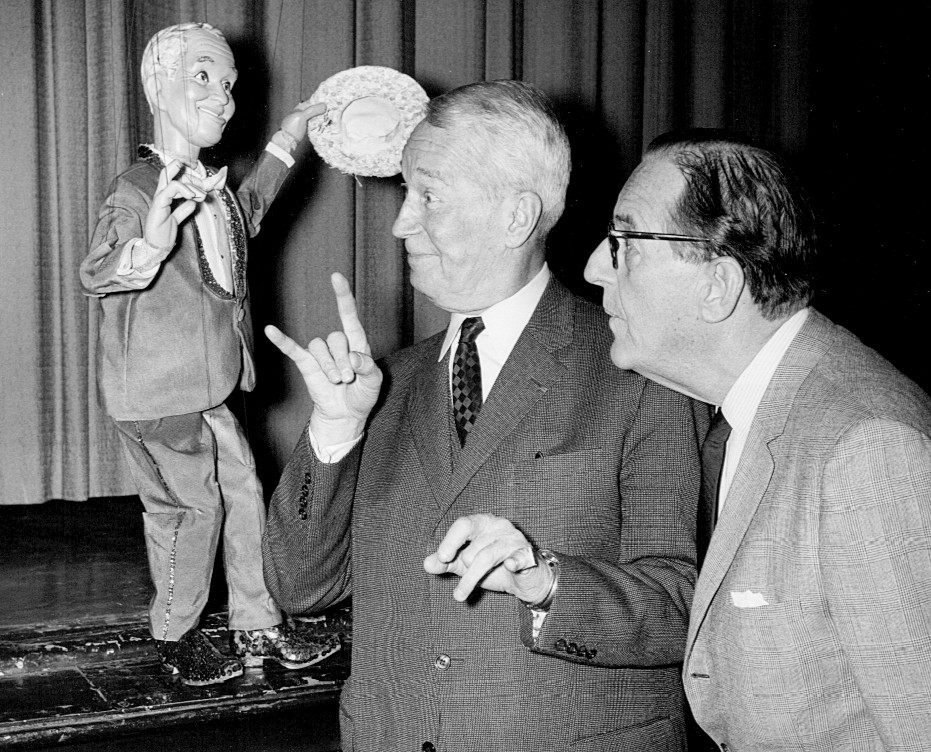
Maurice Chevalier and Stanley Holloway with the Chevalier marionette on The Bell Telephone Hour.

Les Poupées de Paris (The Dolls of Paris) was a musical puppet show created, produced and directed by Sid and Marty Krofft, that toured the United States throughout the 1960s.

== History ==
Puppeteers Sid and Marty Krofft had had a successful career on stages in America and Europe throughout the 1950s. One morning, Sid awoke with the idea to create a show with his marionettes for adults only, complete with music, comedy, horror, celebrities and topless puppets.

Nat Hart, a maître d'hôtel at the Flamingo Hotel, became a fan of the Krofft's work during repeated viewings of their shows at the hotel. Hart approached the Kroffts one day and announced that he was going to open a club, and he asked the Kroffts to put together a puppet show as an attraction for the new club.

The resulting show, which came to be known as Les Poupées de Paris, was modeled after the Paris revues Lido and Folies Bergère. Indeed, an act of the same name had featured throughout the hit 1946 Paris revue Nouveaux Sourires De France created by Jean Valmy. The Kroffts opened the show at their newly built theater the Gilded Rafters in the San Fernando Valley, California in October 1961, though the show was later relocated to P.J.'s, a 200-seat dinner theatre in Los Angeles.

In addition to original characters, many of the puppets were modeled after celebrities. The Kroffts had previously been the opening act for entertainers like Judy Garland and Sammy Davis Jr., so they were able to get many celebrities to record voices for their puppets. Some of these puppets included Pearl Bailey, Milton Berle, Cyd Charisse, Gene Kelly, Liberace, Jayne Mansfield, Tony Martin, Phil Silvers, Loretta Young, and Mae West, whose puppet appeared topless. A handful of puppets were unofficially modeled after other celebrities (Pelvis Essley), and several weren't created specifically for the show — their Frankenstein, Dracula and Madame Jenkins Foster puppets all made brief appearances in the 1957 television pilot Here's Irving.

The show was a success, and became a key attraction at the Seattle World's Fair in 1962, the New York World's Fair in 1964-1965, and the San Antonio HemisFair '68 in 1968. The lavish production cost $200,000 to produce; the elaborate sets took three months to install and included a revolving theatre, elevators, an ice-skating rink and waterfall. The Reverend Billy Graham caught the premiered World's Fair performance of the show and immediately denounced it, complaining that the "women don't wear bras". He failed to mention that the "women" were puppets. This anti-endorsement, coupled with a write-up in Time magazine, resulted in the show taking in record crowds — the Kroffts claimed that tickets were scalped, and the performances were so packed that they couldn't let in personal friends. "Be sure to mention it's dirty, that will give them the picture," Marty explained.

The show traveled around the country for the remainder of the decade and was seen by an estimated nine and a half million people.

== Television ==
Although there was a common practice of filming live shows to be broadcast as American television specials, Les Poupées de Paris was a bit too risque to air on television. However, the Kroffts did appear on several popular television shows to promote their live show, including The Jack Paar Show (November 1961) and The Bell Telephone Hour (December 8, 1964).

Les Poupées led to a brief stint on The Dean Martin Show. In 1964, producer of The Dean Martin Show caught Les Poupées de Paris at the New York World's Fair, and recruited the Kroffts to create a puppet segment on Martin's variety show that captured the essence of Les Poupées. This was their first break into television, but it was to be short-lived; the Kroffts were fired after eight episodes because Martin felt he was being upstaged by the puppets.

== Soundtrack ==
A soundtrack album was released by RCA Records in 1965. The album was nominated for a Grammy Award for Best Engineered Recording – Special or Novel Effects, but it lost out to The Chipmunks Sing the Beatles Hits.

=== Track listing ===
1. Overture – Joe Reisman
2. Bonsoir – Anne Farge and Janine Forman
3. Les Poupees de Paris – Cyd Charisse
4. The Bathtub Scene (Bing Crosby, Frank Sinatra and Janine Forman
5. Don't Say Paris, Say Paree – Gene Kelly
6. You Can't Make It Anywhere – Pearl Bailey
7. Let's Be Frank, Mr. Frankenstein – Joey Forman (Bela Lugosi) and Guy Marks (Boris Karloff)
8. The Lab – Loretta Young
9. The Mad Doctor and the Creature – Paul Frees
10. I Can't Wait to Take You Home to Mother – Milton Berle & Jane Keane
11. The Kook Spooks (Instrumental) – Joe Reisman
12. It's a Living – Liberace, Jayne Mansfield & Lance Legault (as "Pelvis Essley")
13. The Opera Singer – Edie Adams
14. The Ice Skater (On the Wings of Romance) – Chorus
15. Love is a Bore – Pearl Bailey
16. Sadie Fats – Merry Williams
17. Love Is a Bore (reprise) – Pearl Bailey
18. The Circus (Grand Finale) – Phil Silvers & Tony Martin
