= Amazing Grace (1974 film) =

1974 film

- Theatrical release poster by John Solie
- Directed by: Stan Lathan
- Written by: Matt Robinson
- Produced by: Stan Lathan; Matt Robinson
- Starring: Moms Mabley; Slappy White; Rosalind Cash; Moses Gunn
- Cinematography: Edward R. Brown; Sol Negrin
- Edited by: Paul L. Evans
- Music by: Coleridge-Taylor Perkinson
- Distributed by: United Artists
- Release date: August 30, 1974
- Running time: 99 minutes
- Country: United States
- Language: English

Amazing Grace is a 1974 American comedy film directed by Stan Lathan and starring Moms Mabley and Moses Gunn. The film's title is a play on words based on the name of the Christian hymn "Amazing Grace".

== Plot ==
Grace (Moms Mabley) is a widow who influences the local mayoral election in Baltimore, Maryland after discovering that her somewhat slow-witted neighbor, Welton J. Waters (Moses Gunn), is being used to run for mayor by shady politicians and the incumbent mayor to further his own self-serving reelection efforts.

Grace understands that these politicians have no interest in the betterment of the neighborhood and are only focused on getting their hands on the money that comes into it. She organizes some of the people in the community, and together they devise a plan to thwart the crooked politicians' schemes.

== Cast ==
- Moms Mabley as Grace Teasdale Grimes
- Slappy White as Forthwirth Wilson
- Moses Gunn as Welton J. Waters
- Rosalind Cash as Creola Waters
- James Karen as Annenburg

== Production ==
Mabley suffered a heart attack during filming, but had a pacemaker implanted and returned to complete the filming three weeks after the attack. This film marked Mabley's final appearance on screen. The film also featured cameo appearances by veteran actors Butterfly McQueen and Stepin Fetchit.

== Release ==
Originally released on August 30, 1974 by United Artists, the film is available on DVD from MGM, and on Blu-Ray from Olive Films.
