= The Pearl Bailey Show =

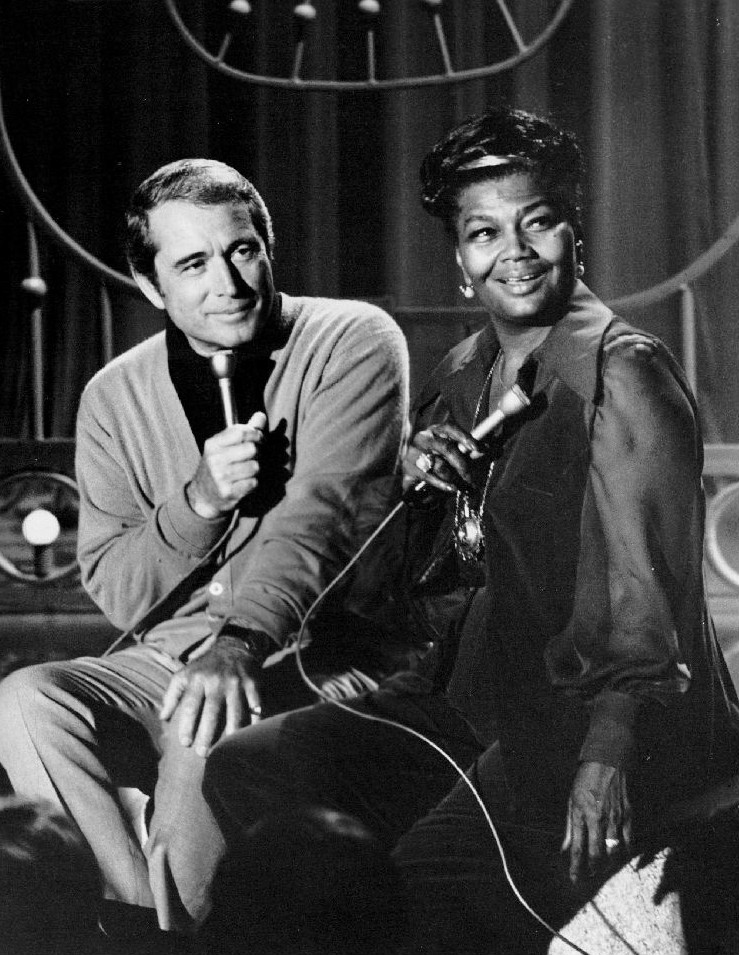
- Perry Como and Pearl Bailey on The Pearl Bailey Show (1971)
- Genre: Variety show
- Written by: Pearl Bailey; Buz Kohan; Bill Angelos
- Directed by: Dean Whitmore
- Starring: Pearl Bailey
- Composer: Louis Bellson
- Country of origin: United States
- No. of episodes: 15

Production
- Producer: Bob Finkel
- Running time: 60 mins

Original release
- Network: ABC
- Release: January 23 – May 8, 1971

The Pearl Bailey Show is an American variety show that aired on ABC Saturdays 8:30–9:30 P.M. from January 1971 to May 1971. A Cooper-Finkel Company production in association with the Pearl Bailey Production Corporation, the show starred veteran entertainer Pearl Bailey.

== Overview ==
Pearl Bailey had a decades long successful career as a singer and stage and film actress by the time she was given her her own variety show in 1971. Bailey's husband, drummer Louis Bellson, was the conductor of the Orchestra for the show. The Robert Sidney Dancers and the Allan Davies Singers were regulars, performing a variety of musical entertainment.

The Pearl Bailey Show featured an array of guest performances by prominent entertainers, including Lucille Ball, Bing Crosby, Louis Armstrong, B.B. King, The Supremes, Tony Bennett, Ike & Tina Turner, and Liberace. "She got everybody she wanted. Nobody would turn her down," recalled the show's producer Bob Finkel. Despite the array of guests, the show was cancelled in less than four months, Finkel suggests due to Bailey "harassing" the executives at ABC with "suggestions and complaints."

== Episodes ==
Episode No.	Airdate	Guests
1	January 23, 1971	Louis Armstrong Bing Crosby Andy Williams
2	January 30, 1971	Lucille Ball George Kirby Sergio Mendes & Brasil '66
3	February 6, 1971	Liza Minnelli Steve Lawrence Cab Calloway
4	February 13, 1971	Ethel Waters Robert Goulet Hines, Hines and Dad
5	February 20, 1971 (reaired on May 8, 1971)	Phil Harris Kate Smith George Kirby
6	February 27, 1971	Perry Como B.B. King Little Steps
7	March 6, 1971	Jimmy Durante Tony Bennett The Supremes
8	March 13, 1971	Wayne Newton Joan Rivers Moms Mabley
9	March 20, 1971	Debbie Reynolds Erroll Garner Perle Mesta Sarah Vaughan
10	March 27, 1971	Douglas Fairbanks Jr. The Ike & Tina Turner Revue David Merrick George Kirby
11	April 3, 1971	Danny Thomas Lola Falana Carmen McRae Orie Sasaki
12	April 10, 1971	Peggy Lee Moms Mabley Erroll Garner The Pastor Brothers Ray Brown
13	April 17, 1971	Gregory Peck Mike Douglas Carol Lawrence Phyllis Diller
14	April 24, 1971	Ella Fitzgerald Donna McKechnie
15	May 1, 1971	Liberace Leontyne Price
—	May 8, 1971	Rerun of episode #5
