= Pearl Bailey =

American actress and singer (1918–1990)

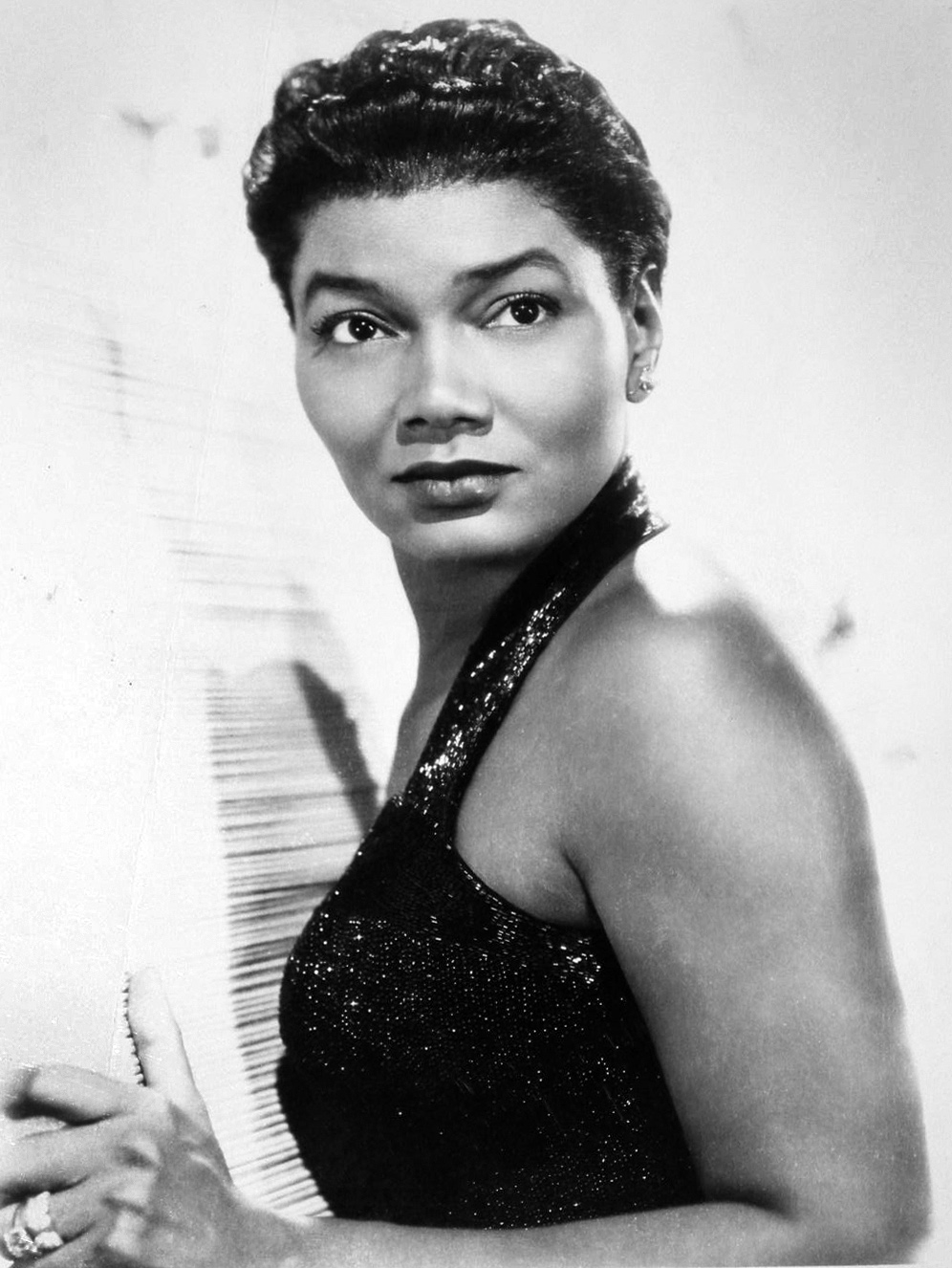
- Bailey c. 1946
- Born: Pearl Mae Bailey; March 29, 1918; Newport News, Virginia, U.S.
- Died: August 17, 1990 (aged 72); Philadelphia, Pennsylvania, U.S.
- Occupations: Actress; singer; comedian; author
- Years active: 1936–1989
- Spouses: John Randolph Pinkett (m. 1948–1952) Louie Bellson (m. 1952)
- Children: 2

Pearl Mae Bailey (March 29, 1918 – August 17, 1990) was an American actress, singer, comedian and author. After appearing in vaudeville, she made her Broadway debut in St. Louis Woman in 1946. She received a Special Tony Award for the title role in the all-Black production of Hello, Dolly! in 1968. In 1986, she won a Daytime Emmy award for her performance as a fairy godmother in the ABC Afterschool Special Cindy Eller: A Modern Fairy Tale. Her rendition of "Takes Two to Tango" hit the top ten in 1952.

In 1976, she became the first African American to receive the Screen Actors Guild Life Achievement Award. She received the Presidential Medal of Freedom on October 17, 1988.

== Early life ==
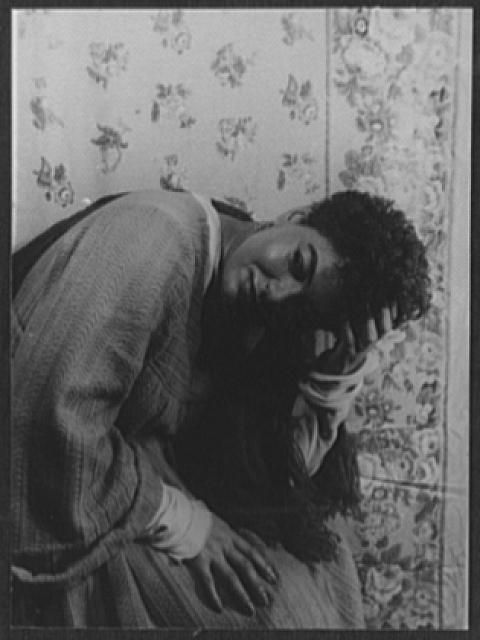
Portrait of Pearl Bailey (1960)

Bailey was born in Newport News, Virginia to the Reverend Joseph James and Ella Mae Ricks Bailey. When she was very young, the family moved to Washington, D.C. After her parents' divorce, Bailey moved to Philadelphia to live with her mother.

Bailey made her stage-singing debut at the age of 15. Her brother Bill Bailey was beginning his own career as a tap dancer and suggested that she enter an amateur contest at the Pearl Theatre in Philadelphia. Bailey won and was offered $35 a week to perform there for two weeks. However, the theater closed during her engagement and she was not paid. She later won a similar competition at Harlem's famous Apollo Theater and decided to pursue a career in entertainment. She was also known to have performed in the church choir at St Peter Claver Catholic Church in Brooklyn, at the behest of Msgr Bernard J. Quinn.

== Career ==
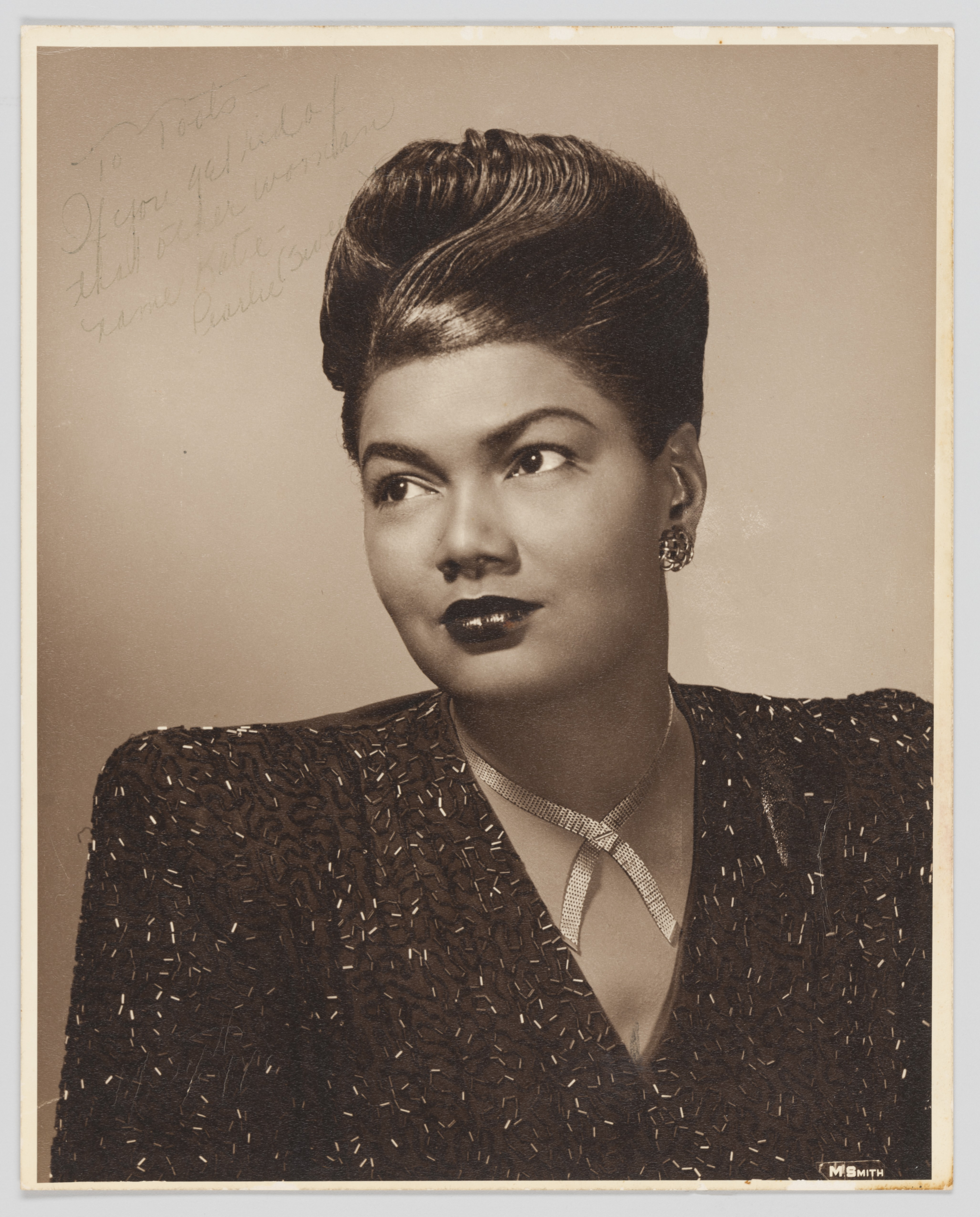
Pearl Bailey, c. 1960

Bailey began by singing and dancing in Philadelphia's Black nightclubs in the 1930s, and soon started performing in other parts of the East Coast. In 1941, during World War II, Bailey toured the country with the USO, performing for American troops. After the tour, she settled in New York. Her solo successes as a nightclub performer were followed by acts with entertainers such as Cab Calloway and Duke Ellington. In 1946, Bailey made her Broadway debut in St. Louis Woman. For her performance, she won a Donaldson Award as the best Broadway newcomer. Bailey continued to tour and record albums along with her stage and screen performances. Early in the television medium, Bailey guest starred on CBS's Faye Emerson's Wonderful Town.

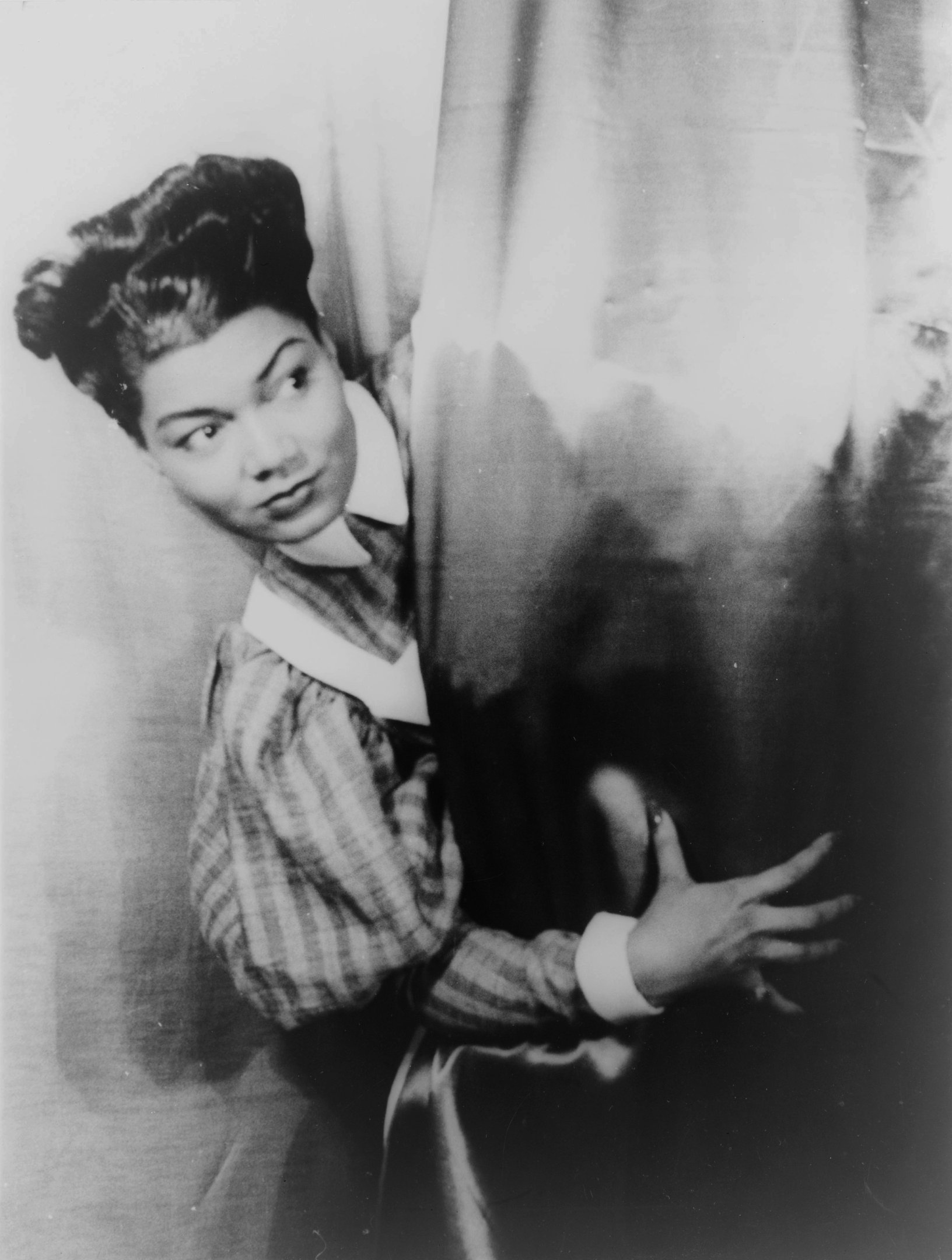
Bailey, costumed in the role of Butterfly, gauges the applause following her performance of the song "It's a Woman's Prerogative" on July 5, 1946. Sustained applause required her to take another bow.

In 1967, Bailey and Cab Calloway headlined an all-Black cast version of Hello, Dolly! The touring version was so successful that producer David Merrick took it to Broadway, where it played to sold-out houses and revitalized the long-running musical. Bailey was given a special Tony Award for her role, and RCA Victor released a second original-cast album, the only recording of the score to have an overture written especially for the recording.

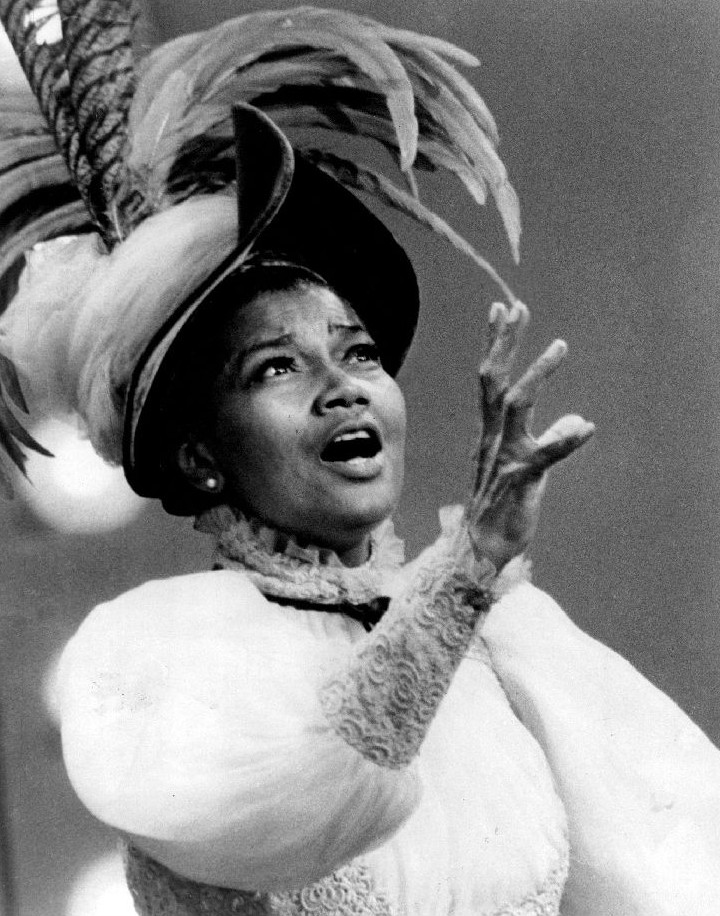
Bailey on The Ed Sullivan Show performing "Before the Parade Passes By" during her run in Hello, Dolly! on Broadway (1968)

A passionate fan of the New York Mets, Bailey sang the national anthem at Shea Stadium prior to Game 5 of the 1969 World Series, and appears in the World Series highlight film showing her support for the team. She also sang the national anthem prior to Game 1 of the 1981 World Series between the New York Yankees and Los Angeles Dodgers at Yankee Stadium.

Bailey hosted her own variety series on ABC, The Pearl Bailey Show (January – May 1971), which featured many notable guests, including Lucille Ball, Bing Crosby and Louis Armstrong (one of his last appearances before his death).

Following her 1971 television series, she provided voices for animations such as Tubby the Tuba (1976) and Disney's The Fox and the Hound (1981). She returned to Broadway in 1975, playing the lead in an all-Black production of Hello, Dolly!. In October 1975, she was invited by Betty Ford to sing for Egyptian president Anwar Sadat at a White House state dinner as part of the Mideast peace initiative.

She earned a degree in theology from Georgetown University in Washington, D.C., in 1985 at age 67. It took her seven years to earn her degree. At Georgetown, she was a student of the philosopher Wilfrid Desan.

Later in her career, Bailey was a fixture as a spokesperson in a series of Duncan Hines commercials, singing "Bill Bailey (Won't You Come Home)." She also appeared in commercials for Jell-O, Westinghouse and Paramount Chicken.

In her later years, Bailey wrote several books: The Raw Pearl (1968), Talking to Myself (1971), Pearl's Kitchen (1973) and Hurry Up America and Spit (1976). In 1975, she was appointed as a special ambassador to the United Nations by President Gerald Ford, a position she held under three presidents. In 1976, she won the Coretta Scott King Award for her children's book Duey's Tale. Her last book, Between You and Me (1989), details her experiences with higher education. On January 19, 1985, she appeared on a nationally televised broadcast gala the night before the second inauguration of Ronald Reagan. In 1988, Bailey received the Presidential Medal of Freedom from President Reagan.

== Personal life ==
Bailey went through a number of failed marriages in her earlier adult years. She married John Randolph Pinkett, either her third or fourth husband, when she was 30 years old, and divorced him four years later, accusing him of physical abuse.

On November 19, 1952, Bailey married jazz drummer Louie Bellson in London. They remained married until her death nearly 38 years later in 1990. Bellson was six years Bailey's junior and white. Interracial couples were rare at that time, and Bellson's father was reportedly opposed to the marriage because of Bailey's race.

They later adopted a son, Tony, in the mid-1950s. A daughter, Dee Dee Jean Bellson, was born April 20, 1960. Tony Bellson died in 2004. Dee Dee Bellson died on July 4, 2009, at the age of 49, five months after her father, who died on February 14.

Bailey, a Republican, was appointed by President Richard Nixon as the nation's "Ambassador of Love" in 1970. She attended several meetings of the United Nations and later appeared in a campaign ad for President Gerald Ford in the 1976 election.

She was awarded the Bronze Medallion in 1968, the highest award conferred upon civilians by New York City.

Bailey was a close friend of actress Joan Crawford. In 1969, Crawford and Bailey joined fellow friend Gypsy Rose Lee in accepting a USO award. That same year, Bailey was recognized as USO's woman of the year. Upon Crawford's death in May 1977, Bailey spoke of Crawford as her sister and sang a hymn at her funeral. American social political socialite Perle Mesta was another of Bailey's close friends. In the waning days of Mesta's life, Bailey visited Mesta frequently and sang hymns for her.

== Death ==
Bailey died at Thomas Jefferson University Hospital in Philadelphia on August 17, 1990. An autopsy confirmed her death was caused by the narrowing of a coronary artery. Bailey had suffered from heart problems for over thirty years.

Bailey is buried at Rolling Green Memorial Park in West Chester, Pennsylvania.

== Remembrances ==
The television show American Dad! features Pearl Bailey High School .

The 1969 song "We Got More Soul" by Dyke and the Blazers includes Bailey in its roster of icons.

A dress owned by Bailey is at the National Museum of African American History and Culture.

A library in her hometown of Newport News, Virginia, is named after her.

== Performances ==
Film

- Variety Girl (1947) – Pearl Bailey – Singer
- Isn't It Romantic (1948) – Addie
- Carmen Jones (1954) – Frankie
- That Certain Feeling (1956) – Augusta aka Gussie
- St. Louis Blues (1958) – Aunt Hagar
- Porgy and Bess (1959) – Maria
- All the Fine Young Cannibals (1960) – Ruby
- The Landlord (1970) – Marge
- Tubby the Tuba (1975) – Mrs. Elephant (voice)
- Norman... Is That You? (1976) – Beatrice Chambers
- The Fox and the Hound (1981) – Big Mama – Owl (voice) (final theatrical film role)

Television

- The Pat Boone Chevy Showroom (prior to 1960) – Herself
- The Andy Williams Show (1963) – Herself
- The Ed Sullivan Show (1968) – Guest Star
- Mike and Pearl (1968) – Herself
- Carol Channing and Pearl Bailey: On Broadway (1969) – Herself
- The Pearl Bailey Show (1971)
  (midseason replacement series) – Herself – Host / Singer
- The Carol Burnett Show (1972) – Guest Star
- One More Time (1974), a CBS musical comedy special
  with Carol Channing, George Burns and others – Herself
- The Love Boat (1977) – Millie Washington
- All-Star Salute to Pearl Bailey (1979) – Herself
- The Muppet Show (1979) – Herself
- The Member of the Wedding (1982) – Bernice Sadie Brown
- As the World Turns (cast member in 1982) – Herself
- Silver Spoons (guest star in 1984, 1985) – Lulu Baker
- Peter Gunn (1989) (unsold pilot) – Mother (final television appearance)

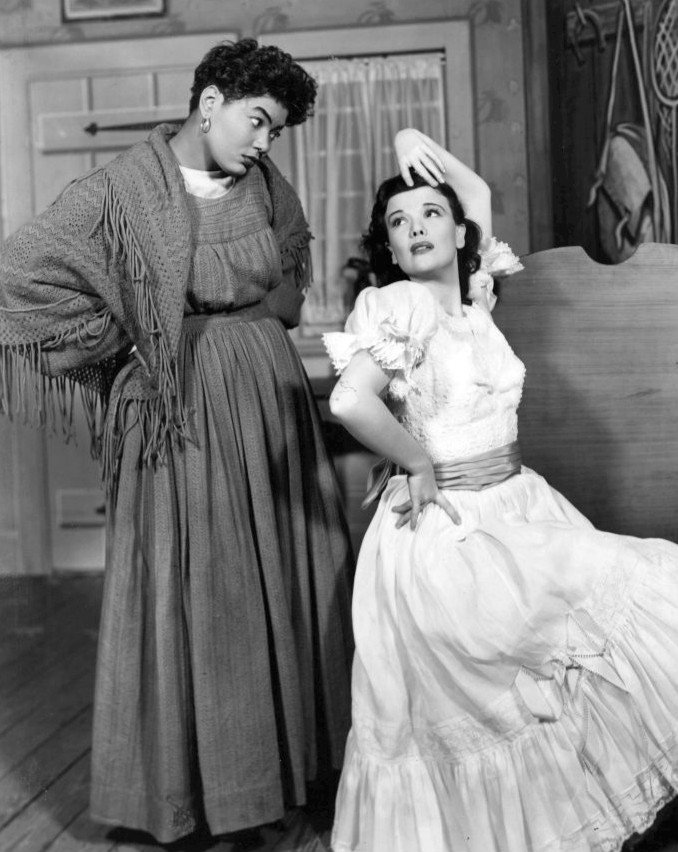
Pearl Bailey and Nanette Fabray in the Broadway musical Arms and the Girl (1950)

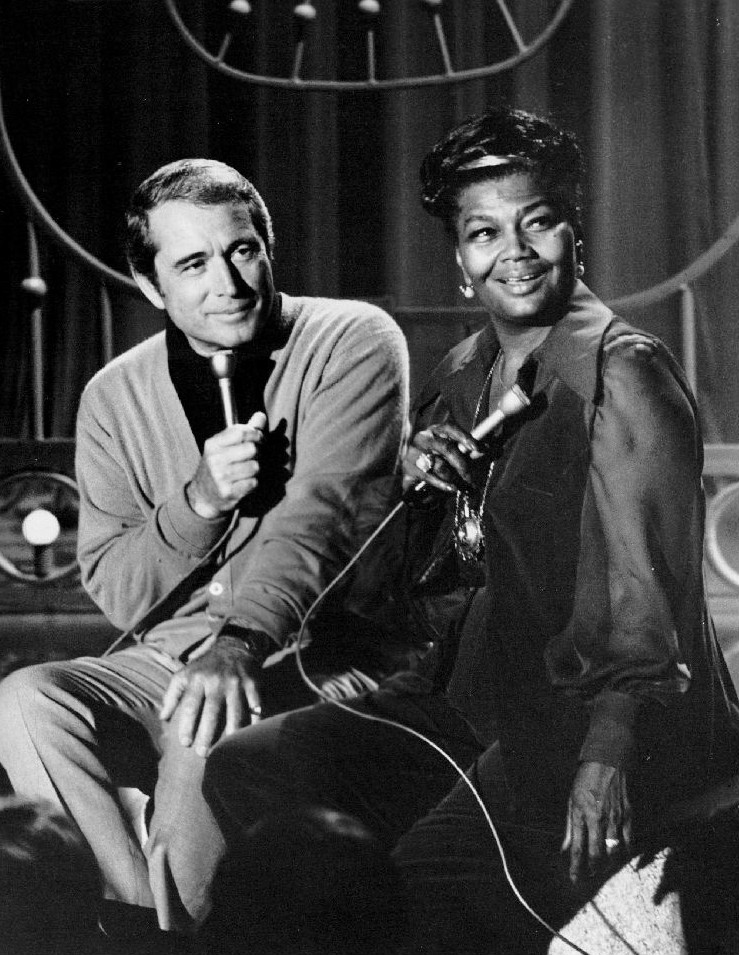
Perry Como and Pearl Bailey (1971)

Theater

- St. Louis Woman (1946) (Broadway)
- Arms and the Girl (1950) (Broadway)
- Bless You All (1950) (Broadway)
- House of Flowers (1954) (Broadway)
- Les Poupées de Paris (1962) (Off-Broadway) (voice only)
- Call Me Madam (1966) (Melodyland Theater)
- Hello, Dolly! (1967)
  (Broadway and US national tour)
- Hello, Dolly! (1975) (Broadway)

== Discography ==
Year	Single	Chart positions			
Year	Single	"US Retail Sales"	"US Disc Jockey"	"US Juke Box"	US R&B
1946	"Fifteen Years (And I'm Still Serving Time)" (with Mitchell Ayres)	–	–	–	4

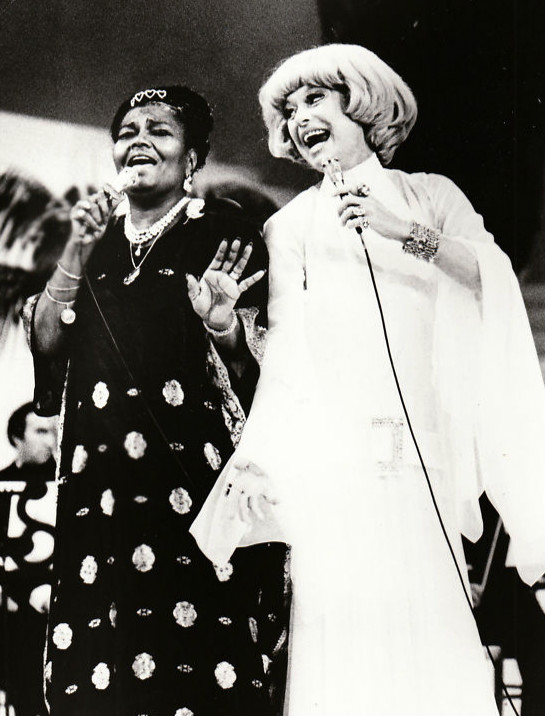
With Carol Channing on a TV special One More Time (1974)

- Pearl Bailey Entertains (1950) and 1953
- Birth of the Blues (1952)
- Cultured Pearl (1952)
- I'm with You (1953)
- Say Si Si (1953)
- Around the World with Me (1954)
- Carmelina (1955)
- The Intoxicating Pearl Bailey (1956)
- The One and Only Pearl Bailey Sings (1956)
- Gems by Pearl Bailey (1958)
- Porgy & Bess, original motion picture soundtrack (1959) (Grammy Award winner)
- Pearl Bailey A-Broad (1959)
- Pearl Bailey Sings for Adults Only (1959)
- Pearl Bailey Plus Margie Anderson Singing the Blues (1960?)
- More Songs for Adults Only (1960)
- For Adult Listening (1960)
- Naughty but Nice (1960)
- Songs of the Bad Old Days (1960)
- Pearl Bailey Sings the Songs of Harold Arlen (1961)
- Come On, Let's Play with Pearlie Mae (1962)
- Happy Sounds (1962)
- All About Good Little Girls and Bad Little Boys (1963)
- C'est La Vie (1963)
- Les Poupées de Paris (1964)
- Songs By James Van Heusen (1964)
- The Risque World of Pearl Bailey (1964)
- For Women Only (1965)
- The Jazz Singer (1965)
- Hello, Dolly! (1967 Broadway cast)
- After Hours (1969)
- Pearl's Pearls (1971)

== Awards and honors ==
Year	Organization	Category	Work	Result	Ref.
1946	Donaldson Awards	Most Promising Newcomer	St. Louis Woman	Won	
1968	March of Dimes	Annual Award	—N/a	Honored	
1968	New York City	Bronze Medallion	—N/a	Honored	
1968	Outer Critics Circle Awards	Outstanding Performance	Hello, Dolly!	Won	
1968	Tony Awards	Special Tony Award	—N/a	Honored	
1969	United Service Organizations	Woman of the Year	—N/a	Honored	
1972	American Heart Association	Heart of the Year	—N/a	Honored	
1976	Coretta Scott King Award	Author Award	Duey's Tale	Won	
1976	Screen Actors Guild	Life Achievement Award	—N/a	Honored	
1988	Presidential Medal of Freedom	—N/a	—N/a	Honored	
1989	Women's International Center	Living Legacy Award	—N/a	Honored	
1994	Hollywood Walk of Fame	Star - Recording	—N/a	Honored	

== Bibliography ==
- The Raw Pearl (1968) (autobiography)
- Talking to Myself (1971) (autobiography)
- Pearl's Kitchen: An Extraordinary Cookbook (1973)
- Duey's Tale (1975) (Photos and Design by Arnold Skolnick)
- Hurry Up America and Spit (1976)
- Between You and Me: A Heartfelt Memoir on Learning, Loving, and Living (1989)

== See also ==
- Takes Two to Tango (song)
