= Seattle Center Armory =

Building in Seattle, Washington, U.S.

Coordinates: 47°37′17″N 122°21′3″W

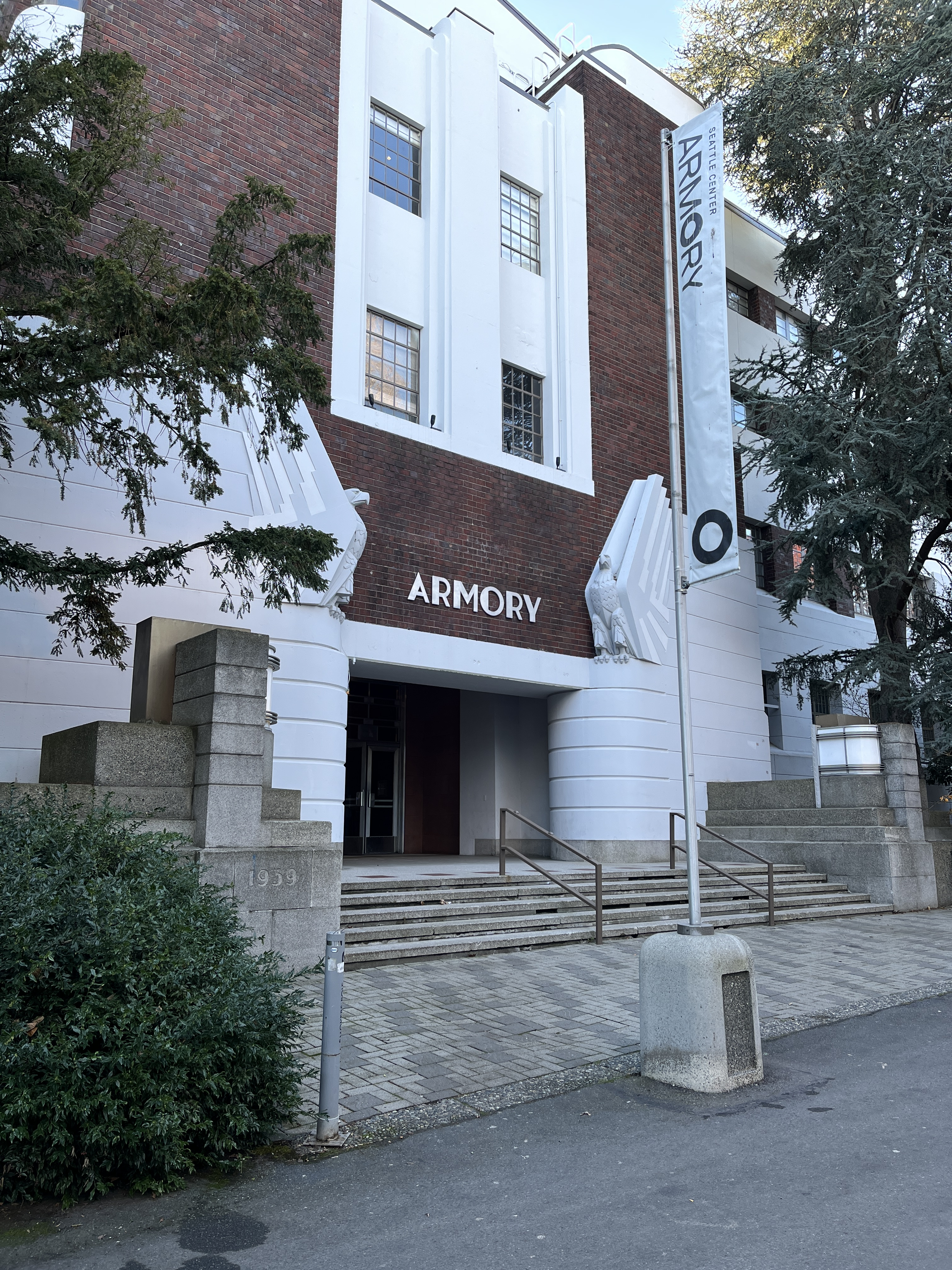
- The building's exterior, 2022

The Seattle Center Armory is a building in the Seattle Center in Washington.

The building has housed the Center House Theater, the Center High School, and the Seattle Children's Museum.

== History ==
The Washington National Guard built the Seattle Field Artillery Armory in 1939 to be used by the 146th Field Artillery, the 66th Field Artillery Brigade, and as the Washington headquarters of the 41st Division of the National Guard.

The building became known as the Food Circus and later Seattle Center House. It was remodeled in 2012.

The building houses a food court which has included restaurants such as Bean Sprouts Cafe and Cooking School, Bigfoot BBQ, Cool Guys Fry Bar, Eltana, MOD Pizza, Skillet, and Subway.
