= 2026 Seattle Center shooting =

Mass shooting in Washington, US

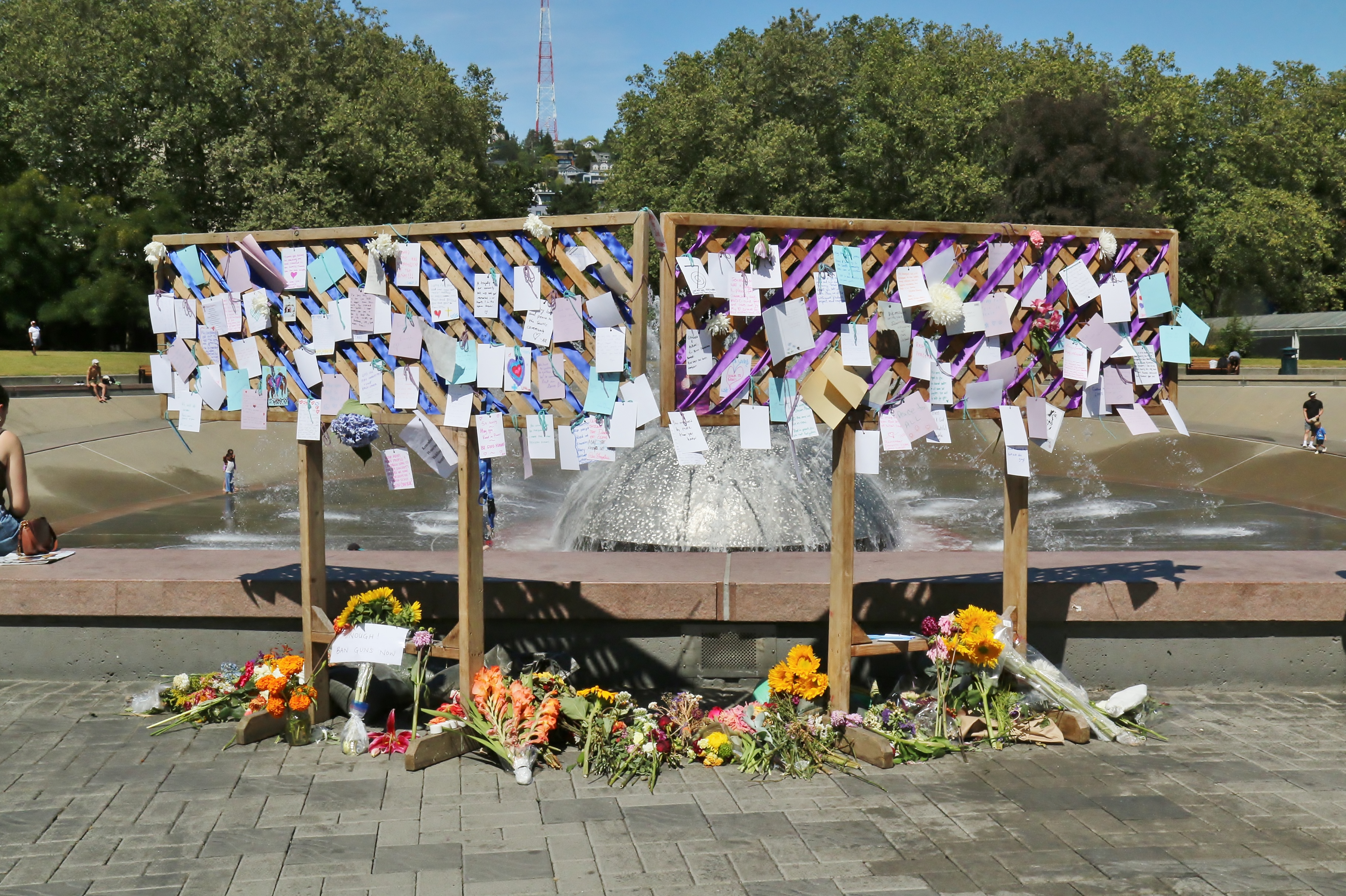
- Memorial at the International Fountain for victims of the shooting
- Location: 47°37′21″N 122°21′09″W; Seattle Center; Seattle, Washington, US
- Date: July 26, 2026 c. 6:00 p.m. (PDT; UTC-07:00)
- Attack type: Shootout (possibly gang-related)
- Weapons: Four, including a 9mm Polymer80 ghost gun, 9mm RO compact, and a 9mm Glock 45 semi-automatic pistol
- Deaths: 3 (including a perpetrator)
- Injuries: 4
- No. of participants: At least 3 (2 identified; at least 1 unknown)
- Charges: First-degree assault; Unlawful possession of a firearm

On July 26, 2026, a deadly shootout occurred during the Bite of Seattle festival at Seattle Center in Seattle, Washington, United States. Three people were killed and four others were wounded. The shooting involved an exchange of gunfire between at least two groups. Two suspects have been identified: an unnamed 15-year-old who was arrested at the scene and 19-year-old Junior Cee Niko Semo, who was killed during the gunfight. As of October 2026, at least one additional suspect remains unidentified and at large.

== Background ==
Bite of Seattle is an annual food festival held at the Seattle Center. The three-day event typically attracts approximately 350,000 attendees. The event features a variety of food vendors, musical performances, and film screenings.

== Shooting ==
The shooting occurred shortly before 6 p.m. outside the Seattle Center Armory, during the final hours of the three-day festival. A food vendor's livestream captured the beginning of the shooting, in which, multiple gunshots can be heard as a crowd of people flees the area; others duck for cover.

A Seattle police sergeant, who was patrolling the area, moved towards the crowd after hearing the gunfire. The sergeant witnessed a 15-year-old suspect repeatedly firing a handgun into a group of people, and arrested him as he tried to flee the scene. The suspect was later taken to Seattle Police Department headquarters for questioning.

Junior Cee Niko Semo, 19, was identified as a second suspect; he died from gunshot wounds at the scene. According to police, the 15-year-old allegedly called out, "Love you bro," to Semo while being escorted by officers.

Seven people sustained gunshot wounds during the exchange of fire.

At least one additional unknown suspect was thought to have fled the scene. As of October 2026, they are still at large.

== Victims ==
The incident resulted in three fatalities and four injuries.

Casualties

- Junior Cee Niko Semo, 19 (suspect; died at the scene)
- Carlos Israel Sanchez Villalba, 44 (died at the scene)
- Ashley Whitehead, 56 (died at hospital)
- 2-year-old boy (injured)
- 39-year-old woman (injured)
- 23-year-old man (injured)
- 27-year-old man (injured)

Four of the victims were taken to Harborview Medical Center, including Ashley Whitehead, who died from her injuries. Whitehead, a cancer survivor, was struck by a bullet in her pelvis while waiting in line at a cotton candy stand. She was survived by her daughter and son-in-law, who were also in the crowd.

Carlos Israel Sanchez Villalba, a husband and father of three, died at the scene after being shot in the torso.

In total, four people, including a two-year-old boy, sustained non-fatal gunshot wounds and were eventually discharged from the hospital.

A 40-year-old woman sustained minor injuries and refused transport to the hospital.

== Investigation ==
As of October 2026, investigators believe the shooting to be gang-related.

Three firearms were recovered from the scene: a black 9mm Polymer80 ghost gun used by the 15-year-old suspect, a Glock 45 9mm pistol, and an RO compact 9mm. The ghost gun had an extended magazine capable of holding 33 rounds, with 19 bullets remaining and a vanity base plate reading, "1 SHOT 1 KILL". The Glock Model 45 also had an extended magazine, capable of holding 40 rounds with 21 bullets remaining. 13 fired shell casings were also recovered. The RO compact 9mm was not believed to have been fired. Based on their preliminary findings, police believed that a total of five handguns were involved.

Police continue to search for more suspects and have not released any descriptions as of October 2026. Police have stated that they believe there were "at least three shooters". One of the suspects, a 15-year-old boy, was charged with first-degree assault and second-degree unlawful possession of a firearm. According to an autopsy report, the 15-year-old's weapon was not responsible for the deaths of Whitehead or Villalba. The boy was initially charged as a juvenile; however, days after the shooting, prosecutors filed a motion to transfer the case to adult court.

Detectives from the Seattle Police Department's Homicide Unit and Gun Prevention Unit were assigned to the investigation. Investigators from the Federal Bureau of Investigation and the Bureau of Alcohol, Tobacco, Firearms and Explosives have also been assigned to the investigation to support local law enforcement.

Video footage captured by Niko Semo was obtained by investigators, in which, him, the 15-year-old suspect, and 9 other people are seen inside a home with 11 firearms lined up on the floor. The video was taken moments before the shooting at Bite of Seattle occurred. Both the Polymer80 ghost gun and the Glock 45 appear in the footage.

Investigators believe the Glock 45 recovered from the crime scene is the same firearm that was used in a 2022 assault and a 2024 weapons violation case. Investigators also believe several of the shell casings recovered at the scene are connected to two separate drive-by shootings involving a 2024 Toyota Tacoma.

== Response ==
Police and security officers assigned to the festival heard the gunfire and responded within seconds of the shooting. According to Assistant Seattle Police Chief Daniel Harris, officers witnessed the 15-year-old suspect firing his weapon. Officers rendered emergency aid to the wounded before Seattle Fire Department personnel arrived. Police said that they did not believe there was an ongoing threat to the public after the initial incident. Washington governor Bob Ferguson deployed members of the Washington State Patrol Special Weapons and Tactics team to assist local authorities.

While emergency personnel treated the victims and police secured the area, parts of Seattle Center were evacuated, including from the Pacific Science Center. Harborview Medical Center was placed on partial lockdown amid heavy police presence in the area.

Seattle mayor Katie Wilson initially reported two suspects had been taken into custody, but her office later retracted the statement.

== Aftermath ==
The Bite of Seattle was cancelled. Vendors reported that their booths had been looted, with equipment and cash stolen, after they were allowed to return to the site. Multiple attractions around the Seattle Center temporarily closed in the aftermath of the shooting, as well as the Seattle Center Monorail.

A candlelight vigil was held for the victims of the shooting on the night of July 27. The vigil was held at the Seattle Center with community members gathering to mourn Whitehead and Villalba. Among the attendees were Seattle Mayor Katie Wilson and Seattle Chief of Police Shon Barnes.

Katie Wilson, in a press briefing on July 27, described the shooting and its impact on the community and called for a cooperative gun violence strategy. Police chief Shon Barnes was criticized for his department's slow release of information related to the shooting as well as his own absence from the city to attend a conference. Barnes announced his resignation on July 30 amid a dispute with Wilson.

A memorial honoring the victims was erected at the Seattle Center's International Fountain.

A fundraiser for the families of Whitehead and Villalba raised over $50,000.

In October 2026, a King County Superior Court judge ordered the 15-year-old suspect be released from juvenile detention and placed under house arrest, with at least 1 adult supervising him at all times.

== See also ==
- Crime in Washington (state)
- Lists of mass shootings in the United States
- 2019 Gilroy Garlic Festival shooting – another mass shooting at a festival
