= Seattle Pride =

Annual LGBTQ event in Seattle, Washington

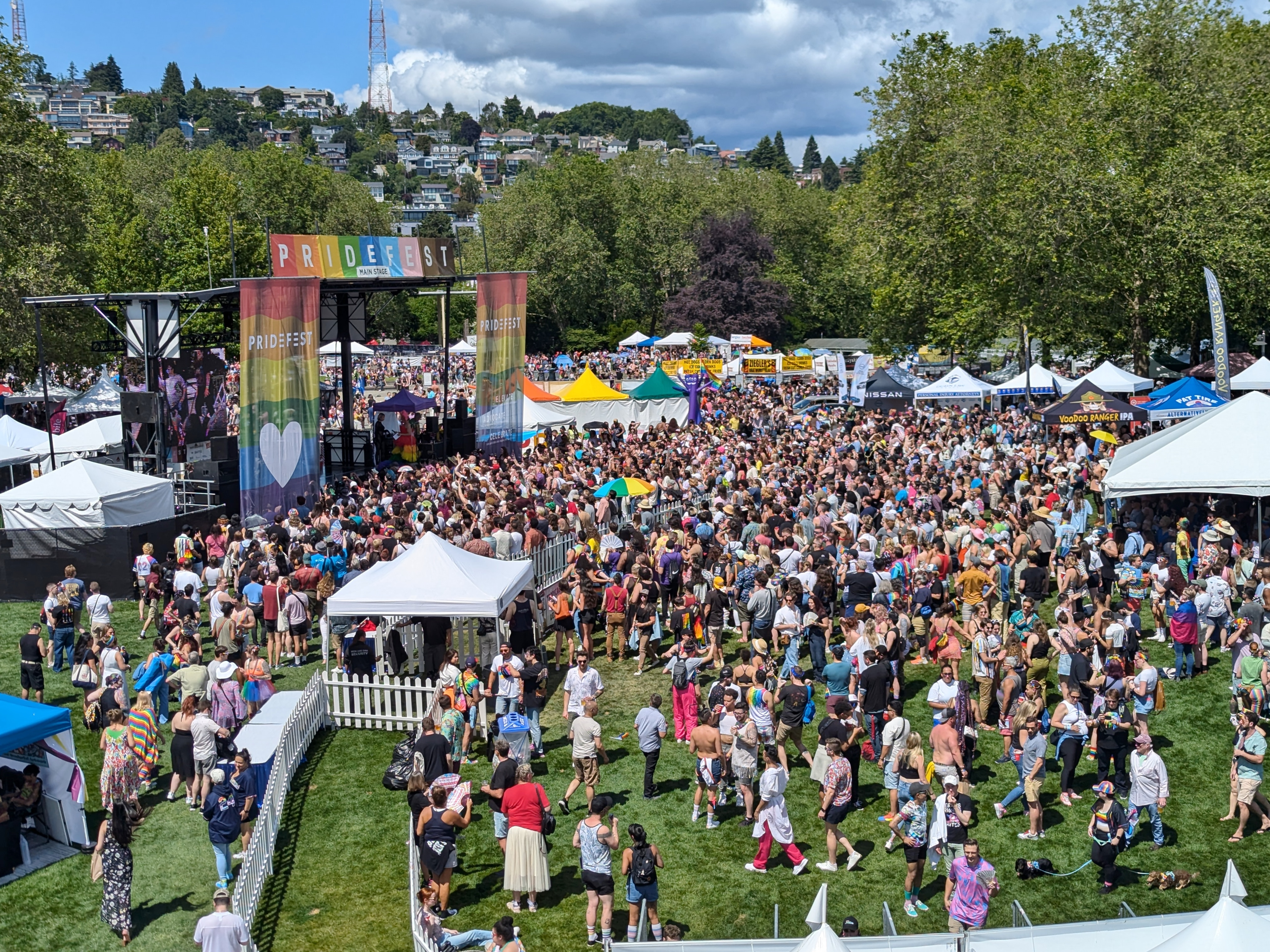
- PrideFest 2024 main stage at the Seattle Center
- Status: Active
- Genre: Pride parade and festival
- Frequency: Annually
- Location: Seattle, Washington
- Country: United States
- Inaugurated: 1974
- Attendance: 300,000+
- Website: seattlepride.org

Seattle Pride refers to a series of events which are held annually throughout the month of June to celebrate LGBTQ Pride in Seattle, Washington. Seattle Pride also refers to the nonprofit organization Seattle Out and Proud which coordinates and promotes LGBTQIA+ events and programs in Seattle year-round including the Seattle Pride Parade.

== History ==
The first Gay Pride Week in Seattle was held from June 24 to 30, 1974, by the city's lesbian and gay community. It included an open house hosted by the Stonewall Recovery Center, a discussion on transsexuality at the University of Washington Hub Ballroom, and a memorial service for victims of the 1973 UpStairs Lounge arson attack in New Orleans. The city's Gay Community Center opened on June 28 and was followed the next day by a 200-person picnic at Occidental Park in Pioneer Square. The picnic moved to Volunteer Park in the afternoon and returned to Occidental Park for an evening street dance with 150 people. On June 30, Gay Pride Week concluded with a spontaneous and unplanned "Gay-In" at the Seattle Center's International Fountain.

The local band Lavender Country, noted as the first known openly gay country music act, also performed during the 1974 festival. The band also later performed a reunion show at Seattle Pride in 2000, following a resurgence of interest when their album was archived at the Country Music Hall of Fame.

The city's first official Gay Pride Week was declared in 1977 by Mayor Wes Uhlman. With a broader acceptance of the LGBTQ+ community came a rise in organized "anti-gay forces" determined to repeal many ordinances that protected LGBTQ+ rights. During the 1978 Pride Week, more than 3,000 participants marched in protest on the parade route that ran from Occidental Square in Pioneer Square to Westlake Park by way of First Avenue. Voters defeated the initiative, preserving the many political gains of that decade. The Parade route remained in place until the early 1980s when it began trading years with Capitol Hill, until it was "permanently" moved to Broadway. In 1992, Gay Pride week was expanded to include bisexual and transgender identities (LGBT). In 2006, the Seattle Pride Parade moved from Capitol Hill back to Downtown Seattle where it originated.

== Seattle Pride ==
A very large LGBT pride flag is held up by attendees of the 2012 Seattle Pride Parade

Seattle Pride is a nonprofit organization that coordinates and promotes LGBTQIA+ events and programs in Seattle year-round. The organization aims to create unity, honor diversity, and achieve equal human rights throughout the region and the world through a variety of programs including its Pride Speaks speaker series, Vote with Pride voter engagement program, and its community grant and sponsorship program.

The organization is best known as the producer of the Seattle Pride Parade, held on the last Sunday in June to honor Stonewall, marking the start of the gay rights movement in the United States. The event attracts 300,000-plus spectators annually with more than 200 groups marching in support of LGBTQIA+ Pride down 4th Avenue in Downtown Seattle.

The organization is also known as the producer of the Seattle Pride in the Park Festival held on the first Saturday in June in Volunteer Park on Capitol Hill. The free family-friendly event features performances by LGBTQIA+ performers, kids activities, booths, and food trucks.

The 2013 Pride Parade was notable for the participation of uniformed members of the Boy Scouts of America, celebrating the recent decision by that organization to allow openly gay boys to join as Scouts. In 2020 and 2021, the organization held virtual Pride Month celebrations in lieu of the Seattle Pride Parade and Seattle Pride in the Park Festival in response to the COVID-19 pandemic.

== PrideFest ==
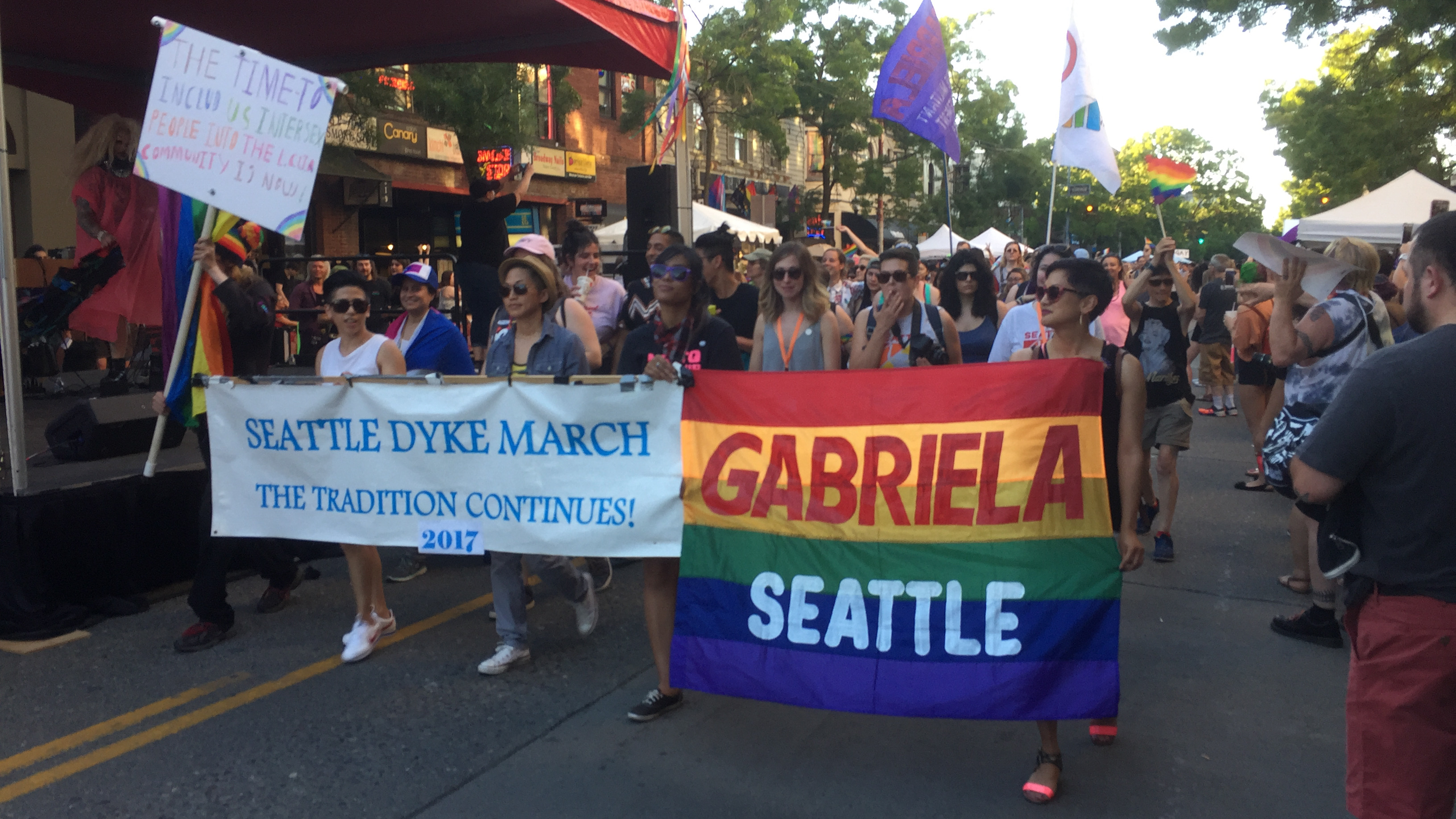
Dyke March at 2017's PrideFest

Seattle PrideFest is held annually at the Seattle Center over Pride Weekend. The festival takes place on the last Sunday in June between noon and 8 pm, immediately following the Pride Parade. This event formerly took place in neighboring Capitol Hill's Volunteer Park, but outgrew that residential location. It was decided in 2006 to move the annual parade to downtown and festival to the Seattle Center to better accommodate the growing attendance.

In 2007, sponsor Seattle Out and Proud was threatened with bankruptcy because the downtown event had been so expensive. Egan Orion of One Degree Events took over the Seattle Pride Festival just six weeks before the event was held, in order to save the event and help preserve the move to the Center the year before. The event was compressed from three days to one, and organizers negotiated a plan with the city to pay an outstanding debt from the 2006 event. The 2008 PrideFest had record numbers at the Seattle Center with over 50,000 people attending on a 95 degree day in June, with over 100 vendors and dozens of sponsors participating. The 2013 event featured more than 100 performers on five stages.
