= Friendship Bell =

Friendship Bell may refer to:

- Bell Circles II, Portland, Oregon, U.S., also known as the Sapporo Friendship Bell
- Kobe Bell, Seattle, Washington, U.S., also known as the Friendship Bell
- Korean Bell of Friendship, Los Angeles, California, U.S.
