= Panda Fest =

Asian food and culture festival in the United States

Logo

Panda bounce house in Portland, Oregon

Panda Fest is a food and culture festival in the United States. It is billed as the nation's largest Asian food festival. Started in New York City, the festival expanded to 11 cities in 2025 and 25 cities in 2026.

There have been festivals in the following cities:

- Bloomington, Minnesota (Mall of America)
- Chicago
- Concord, North Carolina
- Houston
- Indianapolis
- Nashville, Tennessee
- Orlando, Florida
- Phoenix, Arizona
- Pittsburgh
- Portland, Oregon
- San Diego
- Seattle
- Washington, D.C.

== See also ==
- FoodieLand
- List of festivals in the United States
