= McCaw Hall =

Opera house in Seattle, Washington, U.S.

Marion Oliver McCaw Hall
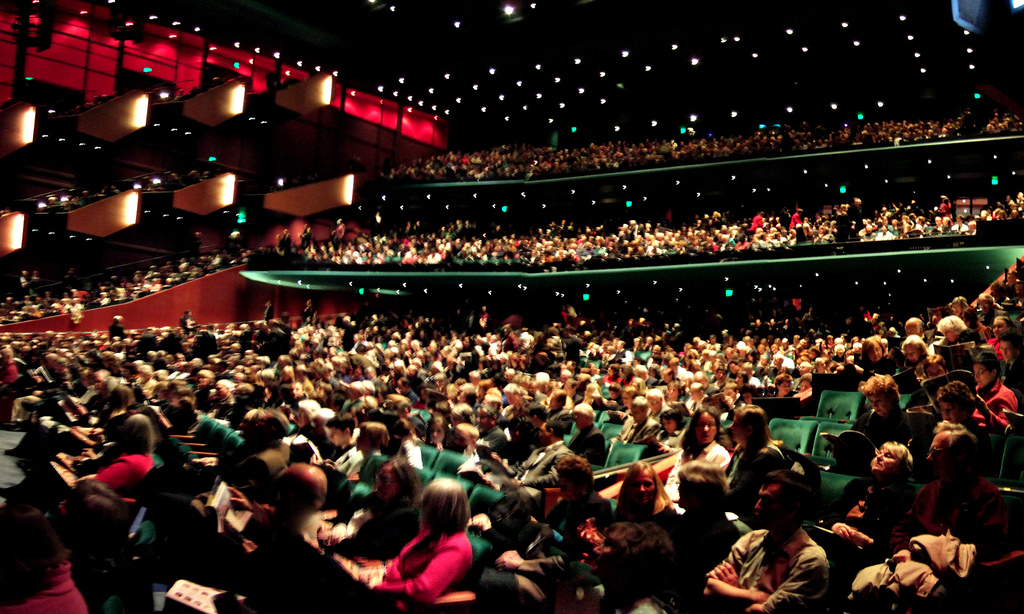
- Interior of McCaw Hall in 2007
- Interactive map of Marion Oliver McCaw Hall
- Former names: Civic Auditorium (1928–1959); Seattle Opera House (1962–2001)
- Address: 321 Mercer Street; Seattle, Washington, U.S.
- Coordinates: 47.624°N 122.351°W
- Owner: City of Seattle
- Capacity: 2,963
- Type: Concert hall

Construction
- Built: 1927–1928
- Opened: May 18, 1928 (original); April 21, 1962; June 28, 2003
- Renovated: 1959–1962; 2002–2003
- Cost: (for 2003 renovation); US$90 million (equivalent to $160 million in 2025)

Website
- http://www.mccawhall.com

Marion Oliver McCaw Hall (often abbreviated to McCaw Hall) is a performing arts hall in Seattle, Washington. Located on the grounds of the Seattle Center and owned by the city of Seattle, McCaw Hall's two principal tenants are Seattle Opera and Pacific Northwest Ballet. The building is named for Marion Oliver McCaw, whose four sons donated $20 million to fund a major renovation in 2003. It was formerly known as the Civic Auditorium and Seattle Opera House.

== History ==
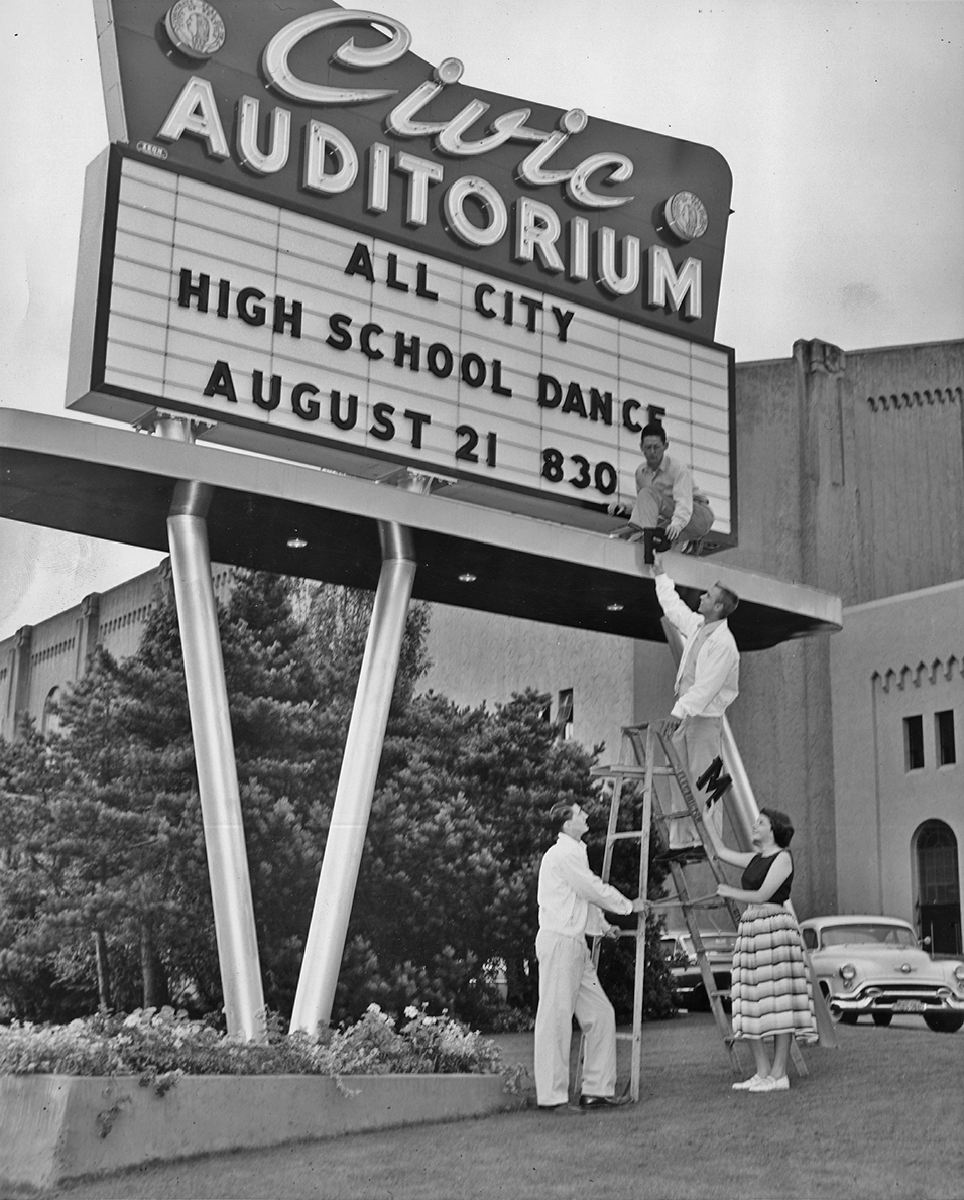
Seattle Civic Auditorium (1954), shortly before the first of two major renovations.

In 1928, the building originally opened as the Civic Auditorium. Its construction was funded by a donation from Seattle saloon owner James Osborne and a voter-approved municipal bond issue; the site was donated to the city by David Denny, one of the members of the Denny Party credited with founding the city of Seattle. The auditorium became the home of the Seattle Symphony and also hosted several touring shows.

=== 1962 renovation ===
In 1956, voters passed another bond measure to fund expansion of the Civic Auditorium for use as a venue in the upcoming World's Fair. Construction began in 1959.

On April 21, 1962, the opening day of the World's Fair, the auditorium reopened as the Seattle Opera House, with a Seattle Symphony performance featuring Igor Stravinsky as a guest conductor and Van Cliburn as a guest soloist.

The Opera House hosted several performances during the World's Fair, including live telecasts of The Ed Sullivan Show, a science fiction panel discussion featuring Ray Bradbury and Rod Serling, and multiple concerts and dance performances featuring acts from around the world.

In 1963, the Seattle Opera company was founded, holding its first season in the Opera House in 1964.

In 1972, the Pacific Northwest Ballet was founded, holding its first season in the Opera House in 1973.

On June 30, 1998, the Seattle Symphony held its final concert in the Opera House, moving to the newly completed Benaroya Hall soon after.

=== 2003 renovation ===
In 1999, voters passed a bond measure to fund another major renovation to the Opera House. The "most dramatic" renovation and expansion of the Opera House began in 2002. Cell phone pioneer Craig McCaw, along with his three brothers, donated US$20 million to help fund construction, and in exchange, the newly renovated building was renamed Marion Oliver McCaw Hall, after their mother.

LMN Architects oversaw the renovation, which involved a redevelopment of 280,000 square feet (26,000 m^{2}) of space, at a cost of US$90 million (equivalent to $160 million in 2025).

In late June 2003, McCaw Hall formally reopened. The first concert at the renovated venue took place on September 29, 2003.

== See also ==
- Kreielsheimer Promenade

== Bibliography ==
- Carter, Jodie (August 25, 2004). "Dreaming in Color". Landscape Online (June 2004). Archived from the original on August 26, 2004. "Thanks to the 'Dreaming in Color' artwork commissioned by the Seattle Art Commission, visitors to the Seattle Center Campus walk under a glowing "ceiling" implied by a series of translucent metal scrims floating overhead in the 300-foot (91 m)-long Kreielsheimer Promenade leading to the Center."
