= Northwest Folklife =

Annual festival in Seattle, Washington, U.S.

Northwest Folklife Folklife
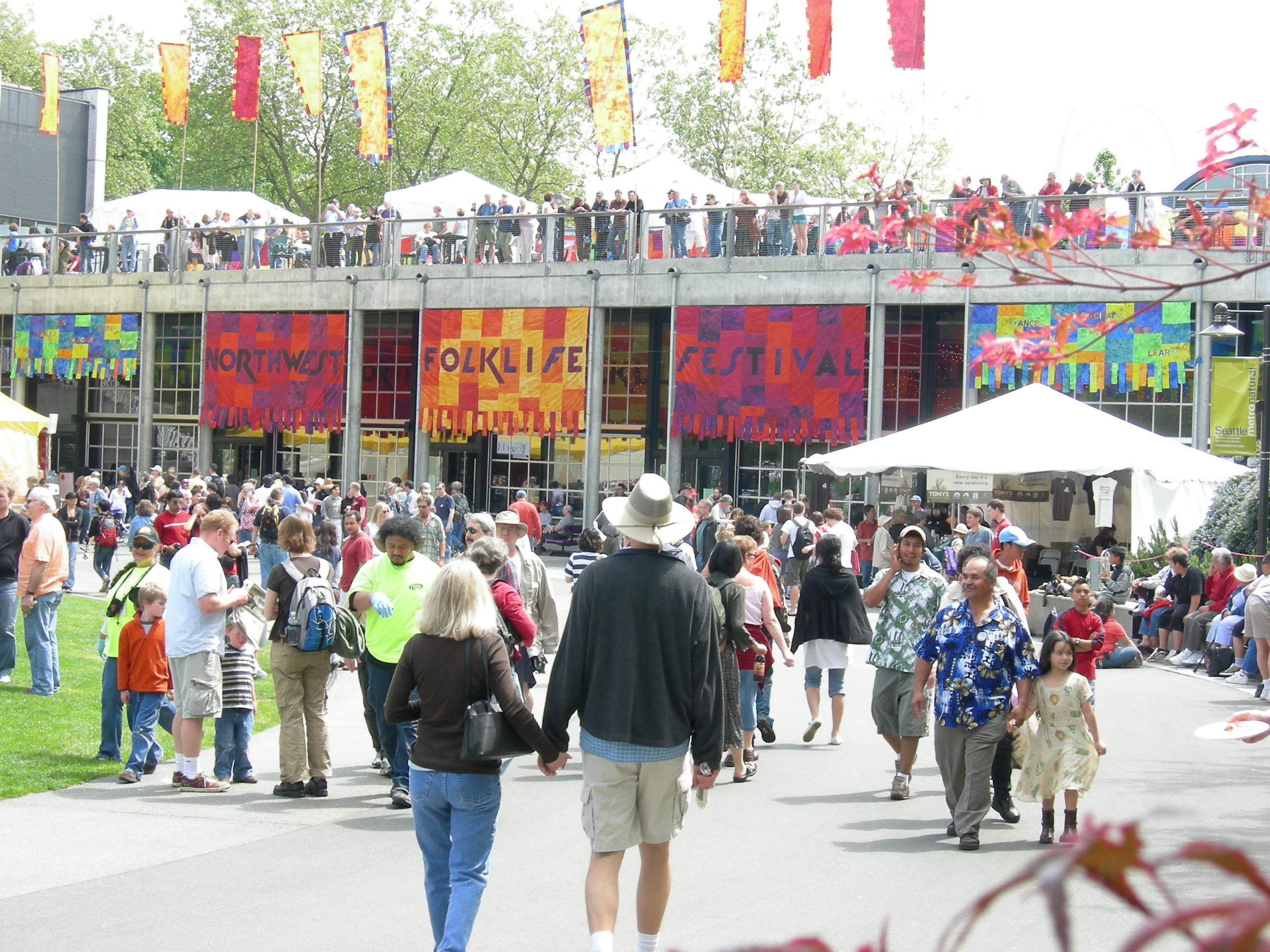
- Fisher Pavilion at Seattle Center during Northwest Folklife Festival 2007
- Genre: Music, dance, arts & crafts
- Begins: Friday before Memorial Day
- Ends: Memorial Day
- Frequency: Annually
- Locations: Seattle Center, Seattle, Washington
- Years active: 55
- Inaugurated: 1971
- Most recent: 2023
- Participants: 7,800
- Patron: 250,000
- Website: nwfolklife.org

Northwest Folklife is an independent 501(c)(3) arts organization that celebrates the multigenerational arts, cultures, and traditions of a global Pacific Northwest.

The Northwest Folklife Festival is an annual festival of ethnic, folk, and traditional art, crafts, and music that takes place over the Memorial Day weekend in Seattle, Washington at Seattle Center. It brings together an estimated 250,000 visitors, 800 volunteers, and about 6,000 musicians, dancers, and other performers. Admission is without charge thanks to community support and donations from attendees. Greeters at the entrances encourage visitors to make donations and special buttons with yearly designs are exchanged for donations.

Northwest Folklife was founded in 1971 by the Seattle Folklore Society, the National Park Service, the National Folk Festival Association (now the National Council for the Traditional Arts), and the City of Seattle, as part of the Park Service's urban outreach program to allow the people of its Northwest Region (including Alaska) to publicly present what they "make for their own use and do for their own entertainment." The first festival was first held in 1972 and has since grown to become the largest festival of its kind in North America.

As a result of the COVID-19 pandemic, the Folklife was cancelled for 2020 and was deferred to 2021.

== Events, performances, and participation ==
Each year, the festival spotlights a particular ethnic community or folk tradition through the Cultural Focus program. In recent years, these cultural focuses have included maritime culture, Arab-American life, the Urban Indian, Bulgarian Culture and the passing of cultural traditions from generation to generation. The most recent Cultural Focus programs include the Traditional Roots of Hip Hop, Echoes of Aztlan and Beyond and Youth Rising. The festival has over 20 stages, large and small, set up throughout the Seattle Center grounds, which feature mostly local acts organized by the festival. Like the volunteers who support the festival, they perform without compensation. Many of the venues, notably the Armory and the nearby Fisher Pavilion, are set up for participatory dancing.

The festival grounds also include extensive space for music jams and drum circles. Many attendees from across Washington state, Oregon and British Columbia, come to Northwest Folklife annually to play music with friends.

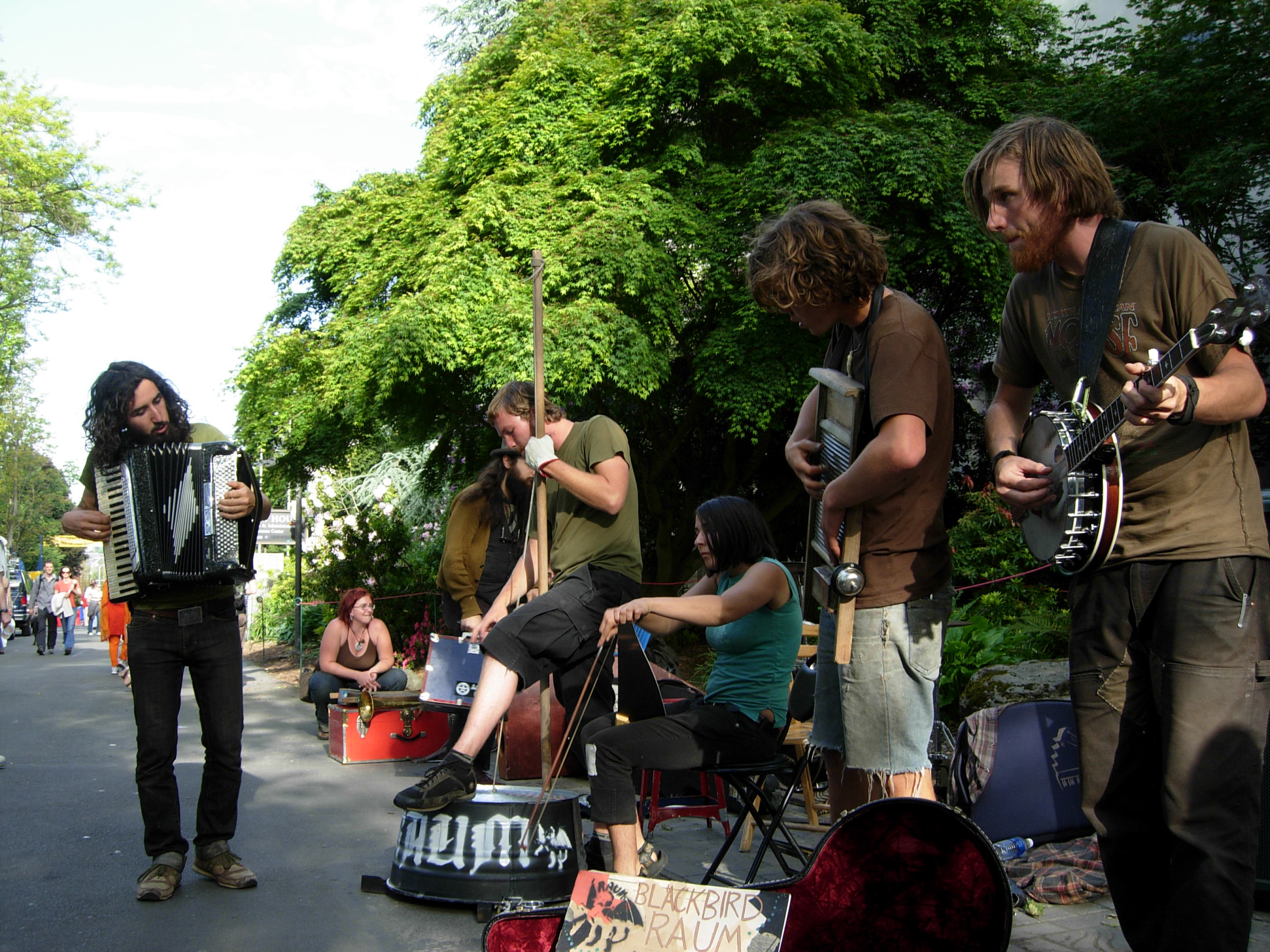
Blackbird Raum busking at the Folklife Festival.

The festival also has buskers (or street performers) who come to the festival from all over and perform along the Seattle Center walkways. The buskers include musicians, jugglers, circus performers, and magicians, and vary in age, style, and professionalism, all playing for donations from the crowds. As of 2025, festival organizers asked that buskers donate 20% of their earnings (from any tips or CD sales) to the festival.

The performances featured both on and off stage expand on what the term "folk" means. Traditional folk music from all over the world is performed, along with rockabilly, Balkan brass, folk punk, jug band, and other music that defies categorization. Dance performances include international folk dancing (including Morris dancing) as well as swing and blues.

The festival is also a place where people can simply hang out and enjoy the (usually sunny) Memorial Day Weather. The giant fountain in the center of Seattle Center serves as a water park. Since the festival is open to all, people often come to picnic, sunbathe, or just enjoy the grounds.
