= Seattle Center =

Arts, educational, tourism and entertainment center in Seattle, Washington

Coordinates: 47°37′21″N 122°21′09″W

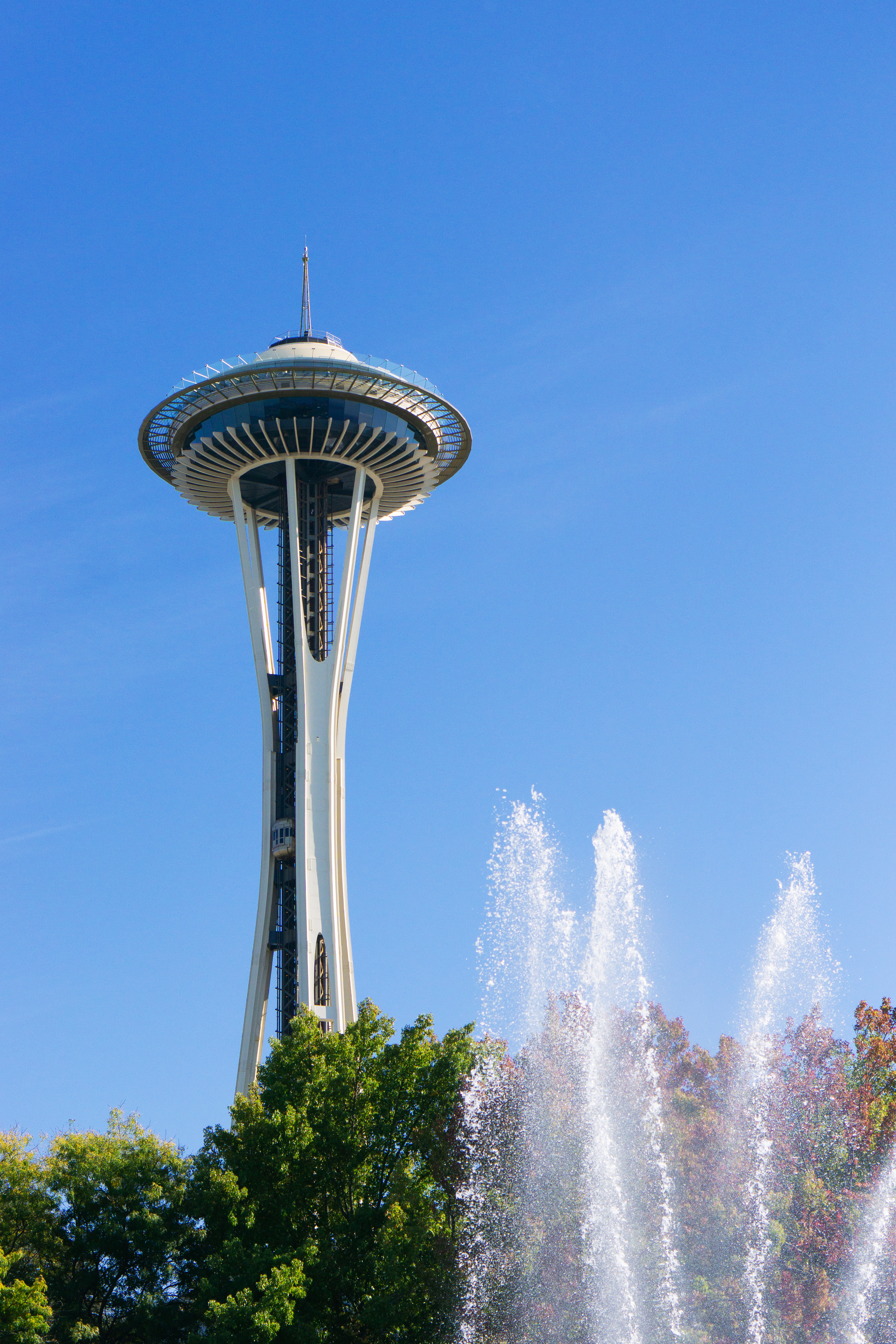
- Space Needle and International Fountain, Seattle Center
- Interactive map of Seattle Center
- Address: 305 Harrison Street; Seattle, Washington; United States
- Owner: City of Seattle
- Acreage: 74 acres (30 ha)
- Public transit: Seattle Center Monorail

Construction
- Opened: 1962

Tenants
- Academy of Interactive Entertainment; The Center School; Chihuly Garden and Glass; Climate Pledge Arena; Cornish College of the Arts; KEXP; KING-FM; Museum of Pop Culture; Northwest Folklife; Pacific Northwest Ballet; Pacific Science Center; Seattle Children's Museum; Seattle Children's Theatre; SIFF Film Center; Seattle Opera; Seattle Repertory Theatre; Space Needle; The Vera Project

Website
- seattlecenter.com

The Seattle Center is an entertainment, education, tourism and performing arts center located in the Lower Queen Anne neighborhood of Seattle, Washington, United States. Constructed for the 1962 World's Fair, the Seattle Center's landmark feature is the 605 ft (184 m) Space Needle, an official city landmark and globally recognized symbol of Seattle's skyline. Other notable attractions include Pacific Science Center, Climate Pledge Arena, and the Museum of Pop Culture (MoPOP), as well as McCaw Hall, which hosts both Seattle Opera and Pacific Northwest Ballet. The Seattle Center Monorail provides regular public transit service between the Seattle Center and Westlake Center in downtown Seattle, and is itself considered a tourist attraction.

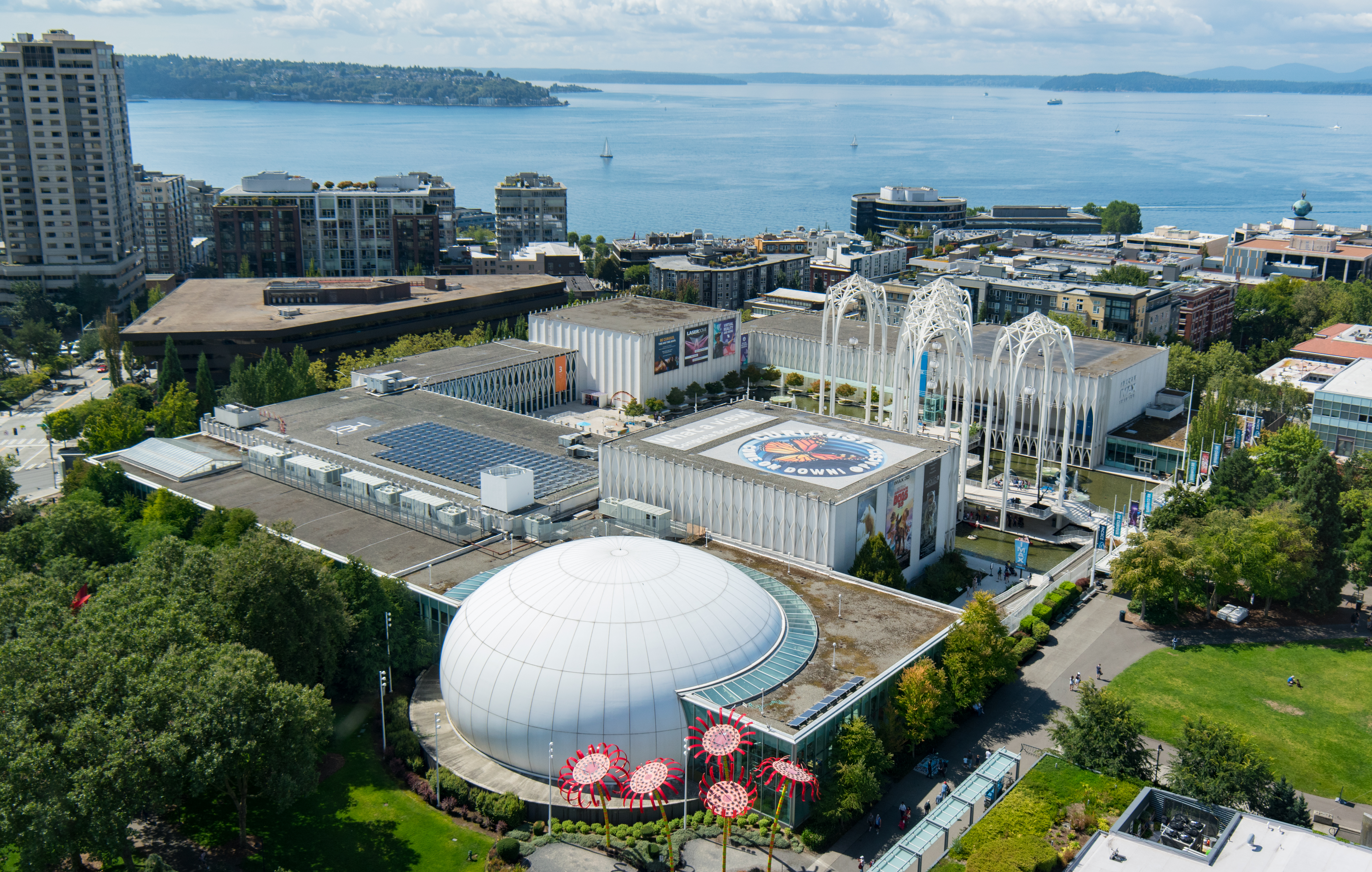
Pacific Science Center

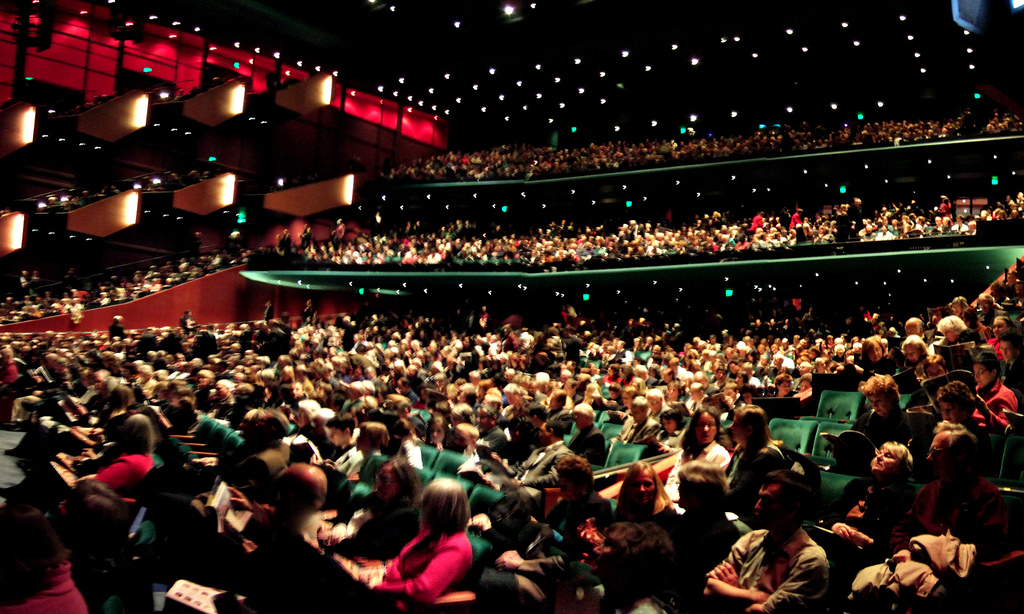
Marion Oliver McCaw Hall

== History ==
=== Background ===
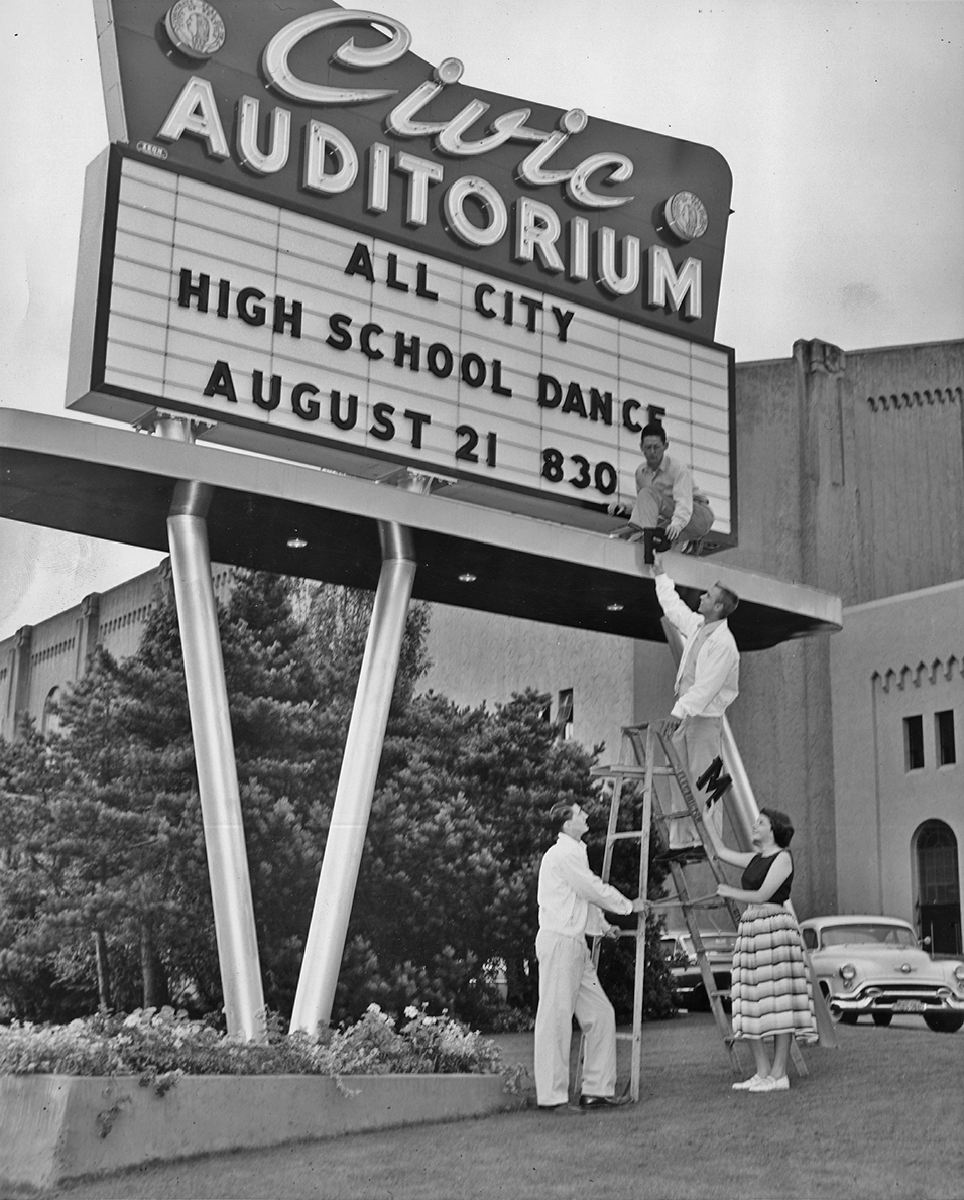
Seattle Civic Auditorium, 1954

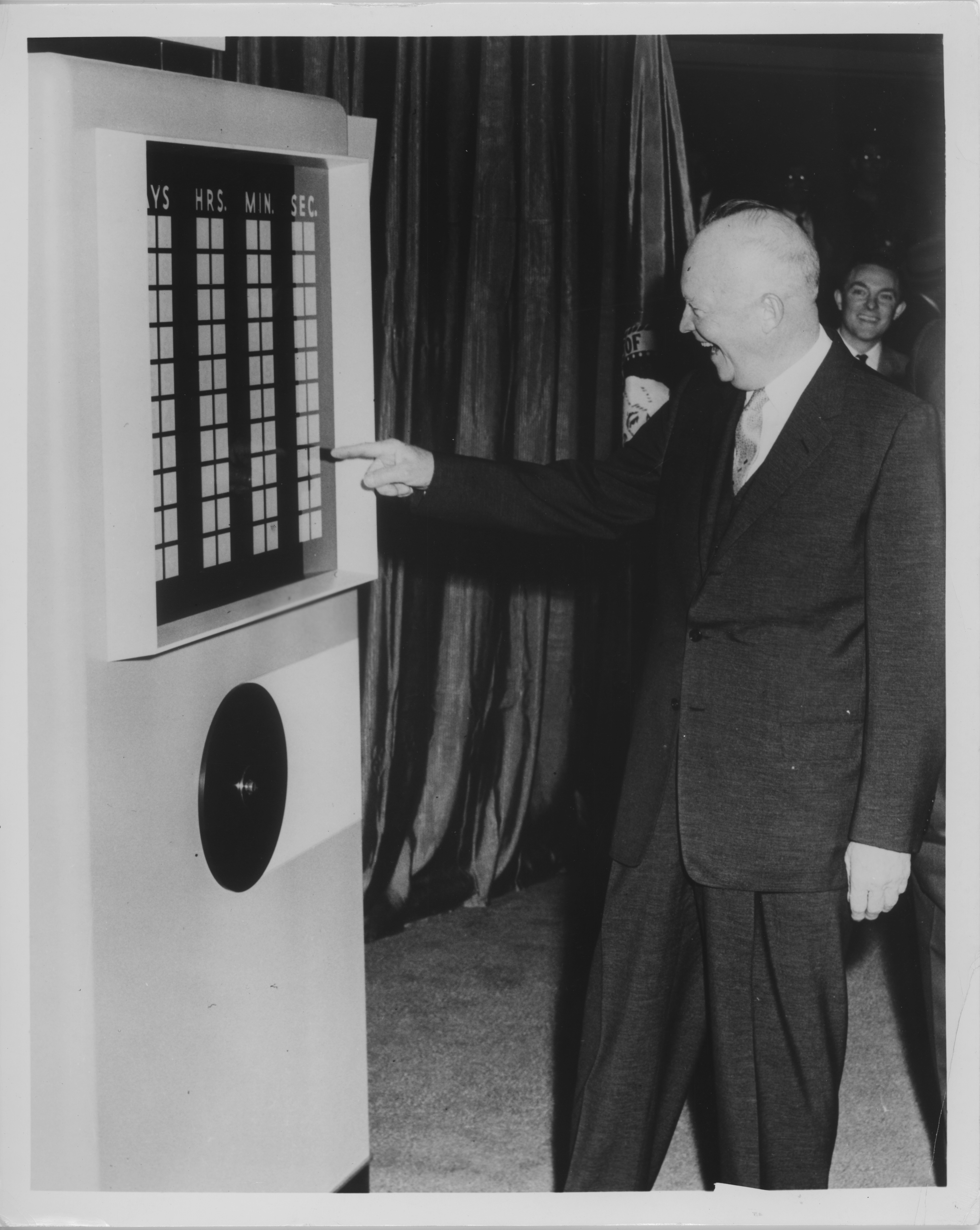
President Dwight D. Eisenhower starts the electronic countdown to the opening of the 1962 Seattle World's Fair, 1958

In 1886, Seattle founder David Denny donated the tract of land that would eventually host the Seattle Center, stipulating that it be of "public use forever".

Plans for the land took shape in 1928, when mayor Bertha Knight Landes dedicated the newly-constructed arena and auditorium on the site as the Civic Center complex.

The Seattle Field Artillery Armory was constructed in 1939.

=== World's Fair ===
In 1958, the Civic Auditorium was chosen as the future location of the World's Fair, and demolition work began following a countdown ceremony initiated by President Dwight D. Eisenhower.

In 1961, Japanese architects Hideki Shimizu and Kazuyuki Matsushita were chosen to design the International Fountain, and a contract with Alweg Rapid Transit Systems was signed for the construction of the monorail line. On April 21, 1962, President John F. Kennedy officially opened the World's Fair; the six-month event was attended by, among others, astronaut John Glenn, politician Robert F. Kennedy, and singer Elvis Presley, who arrived in September 1962 to shoot the film It Happened at the World's Fair.

=== Later history ===
On June 1, 1963, ownership of the complex was returned to the City of Seattle, which has since maintained it as a hub for the city's performing arts and sporting events. Some of the facilities were leased to the Century 21 Center, a nonprofit corporation formed in 1962 to promote the Seattle Center complex. In December 1964, City of Seattle announced its intent to take over management of the Century 21 Center from the corporation after it had incurred $300,000 in debts. The corporation was dissolved in 1965 and promotion of the Seattle Center was transferred to Greater Seattle, Inc., the region's tourism organization.

As of 1965, the Seattle Center Armory remained under the ownership of the Washington State Military Department but was leased to the city government for use as an events and museum space.

The Seattle Center campus underwent a decline in attendance and importance after the World's Fair, which led to proposal to redevelop it for other uses. The Seattle city government contracted Walt Disney Imagineering in 1987 to design a long-term campus plan; the Disney proposal included replacement of the International Fountain with a pond and Memorial Stadium with a parking garage topped by an artificial meadow. The proposals were rejected by the city government after public outcry at hearings.

== Attractions ==
Several buildings and pieces of artwork at the Seattle Center have Japanese influences. These include the Pacific Science Center, designed by architect Minoru Yamasaki, The Seattle Mural by artist Paul Horiuchi, and the Kobe Bell, a gift to Seattle from its sister city of Kobe, Japan.

=== Landmarks ===
- The Space Needle, an official city landmark, featuring an observation deck and formerly a revolving restaurant. At the time of its completion in 1961, the Space Needle was the tallest structure west of the Mississippi River.
- International Fountain, located in the center of the complex. Designed by Japanese architects Kazuyuki Matsushita and Hideki Shimizu, the fountain was built as a modernist water sculpture and renovated extensively in 1995. With over 20 spouts, the fountain rotates through programmed cycles of water patterns, accompanied by recorded music from around the world. The music is changed twice a month; it is chosen to complement the water patterns and events programming at the center.
- John T. Williams totem pole—A 34-foot (10 m) totem pole commemorating John T. Williams.
- Kobe Bell, an official city landmark
- Mural Amphitheatre, featuring a mosaic mural by artist Paul Horiuchi; The Seattle Mural, also created for the World's Fair, is an official city landmark.
- Artists At Play playground
- Howard S. Wright Memorial Fountain
- Seattle Center Monorail, which runs between the Seattle Center and Westlake Center

=== Museums ===
- Museum of Pop Culture (MoPOP, formerly EMP Museum)
- Chihuly Garden and Glass
- Pacific Science Center, located in the former United States Science Pavilion building designed by Minoru Yamasaki
- Seattle Children's Museum, located in the Armory

=== Performing arts ===
- Marion Oliver McCaw Hall, home of the Seattle Opera and Pacific Northwest Ballet, whose ballet school is adjacent at the Phelps Center. This is the third performance space on this site, the second being the Opera House built at the time of the World's Fair.
- Seattle Repertory Theatre, home of the Bagley Wright Theatre, the Leo Kreielsheimer Theatre, and the PONCHO Forum
- Center Theatre, home of the Seattle Shakespeare Company and Book-It Repertory Theatre
- Theatre Puget Sound
- The Center School
- Cornish Playhouse (originally the Seattle Center Playhouse, later renamed Intiman Playhouse when Intiman Theatre was primary tenant), home of productions of the Cornish College of the Arts
- Seattle Children's Theatre at the Charlotte Martin Theatre
- The Vera Project (or VERA)
- Mercer Arena, formerly a sports, concert, and opera venue before sitting vacant for several years. It was demolished and the site is being redeveloped as the future home of Seattle Opera.
- KEXP Gathering Space

=== Venues ===
- Seattle Center Armory (known as Center House from the early 1970s until 2012, and the Food Circus from 1962 to the early 1970s), including Center Theatre, the home of Seattle Shakespeare Company and Book-It Repertory Theatre, as well as the Seattle Children's Museum, The Center High School and the Academy of Interactive Entertainment. Before the 1962 World's Fair, the building was an armory. Seattle Center Armory is an official city landmark.
  - A piece of the Berlin Wall is in the food atrium.
- Exhibition Hall, a space for trade shows, receptions, exhibits, and special events
- Fisher Pavilion at Seattle Center is one of the largest rental venues on the grounds and the first City of Seattle building to achieve LEED (Leadership in Energy and Environmental Design) certification. The large, flexible space can accommodate a wide range of commercial, charity and community events.
- The Northwest Rooms, once a small conference center, now houses SIFF Film Center, The VERA Project, and KEXP-FM.
- IMAX Theater at Pacific Science Center
- Seattle Laser Dome

=== Athletics ===
- Climate Pledge Arena is the current home of the Seattle University Redhawks men's basketball team, the WNBA's Seattle Storm and the NHL's Seattle Kraken. It was the home of the NBA's Seattle SuperSonics, now the Oklahoma City Thunder, and the Seattle Thunderbirds (Western Hockey League) ice hockey. Originally opened as the Seattle Center Coliseum in 1962, it was renovated in 1995 as KeyArena and rebuilt in 2020–2021 as Climate Pledge Arena. The arena hosts over 100 events per year and was the region's top live concert touring venue in 2016 (according to Venues Today magazine)
- Memorial Stadium, a high school football and soccer stadium which predates the World's Fair. It was the home of the NWSL's Seattle Reign FC from 2014 to 2018.

=== Festivals and events ===
The Seattle Center hosts many cultural, music and arts festivals. Major attractions include:

- Bumbershoot
- Northwest Folklife
- Festál (year-long series of 24 world cultural events)
- PrideFest
- Bite of Seattle
- Winterfest

Beginning in 2014, the Seattle Center and its facilities have hosted an annual free clinic to provide medical, dental, and vision care with volunteers and donated supplies over a two-day period. The clinic served more than 3,000 people annually and is scheduled to cease operations in 2027.

== Incidents ==
The Bite of Seattle, an annual food festival at the Seattle Center, has been the site of several shootings and riots. The 1998 edition was interrupted by a riot with 1,000 people, while a 16-year-old boy was shot near the event in 2006. On July 26, 2026, a mass shooting occurred during the Bite of Seattle. Three people were killed and four people were injured; the festival was moved to the following day.

In 2008, two people were injured during a shooting at the Northwest Folklife festival, which was also hosted at the Seattle Center.

== Gallery ==
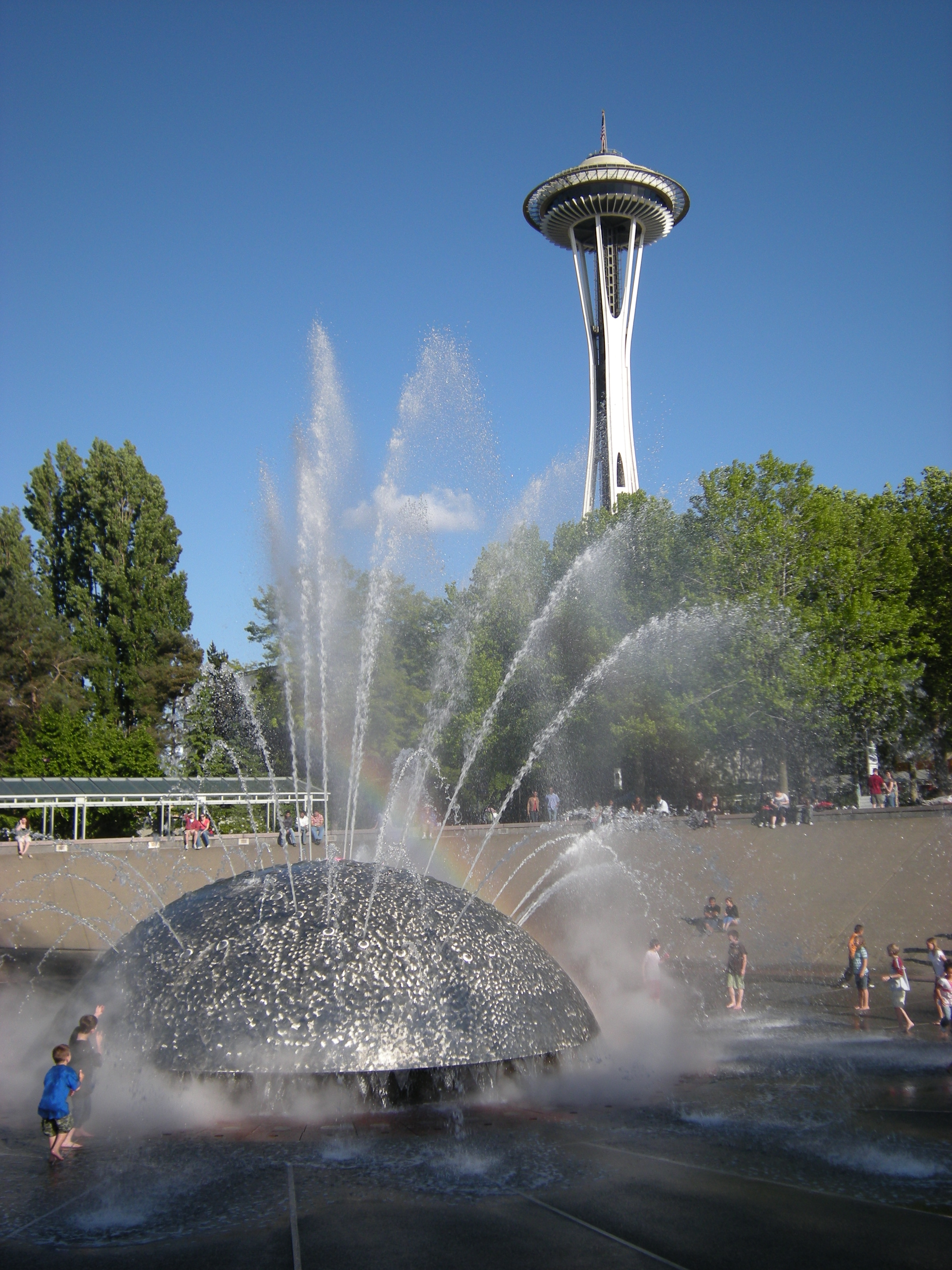
View of the Space Needle with the International Fountain in the foreground.

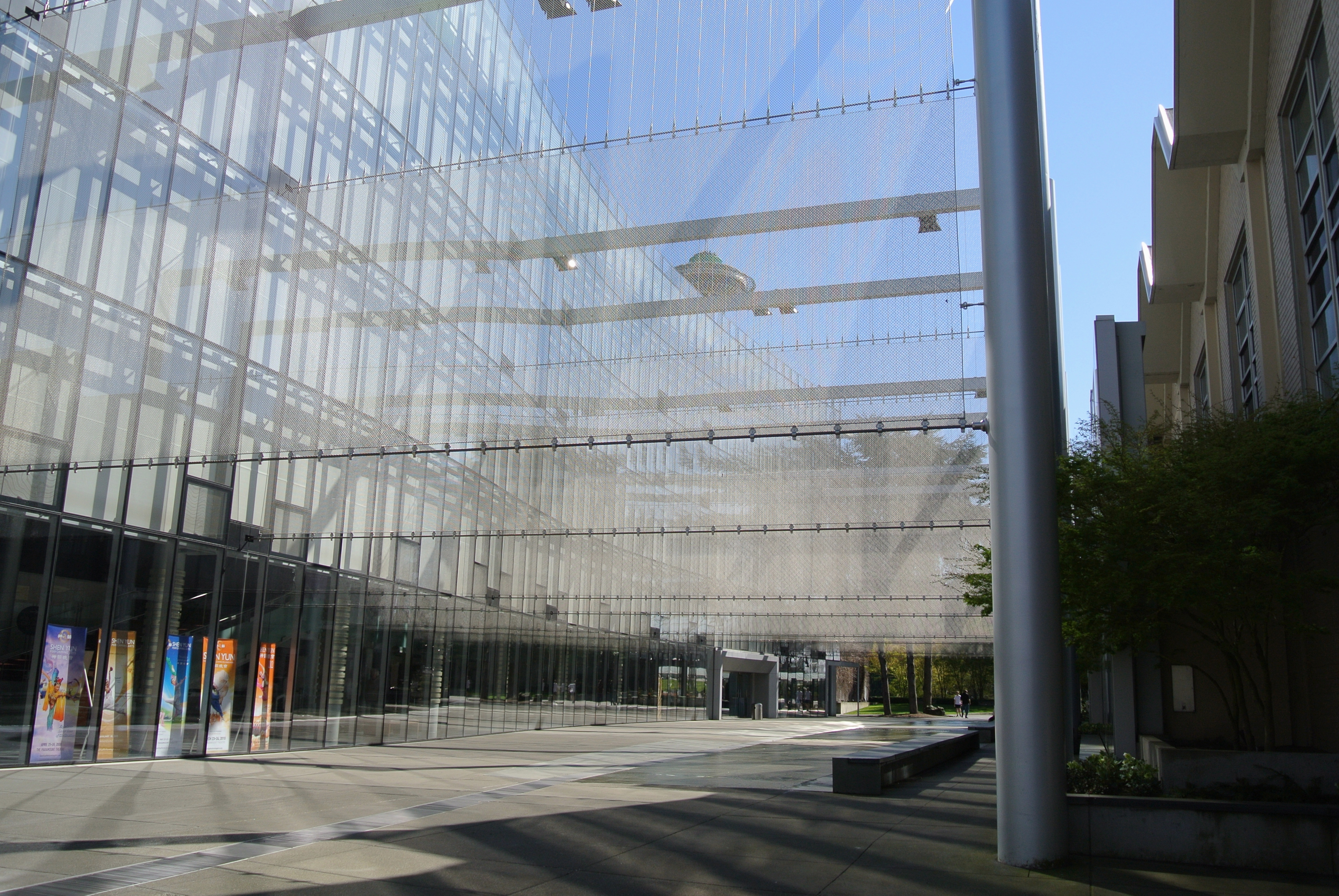
Kreielsheimer Promenade and Marion Oliver McCaw Hall

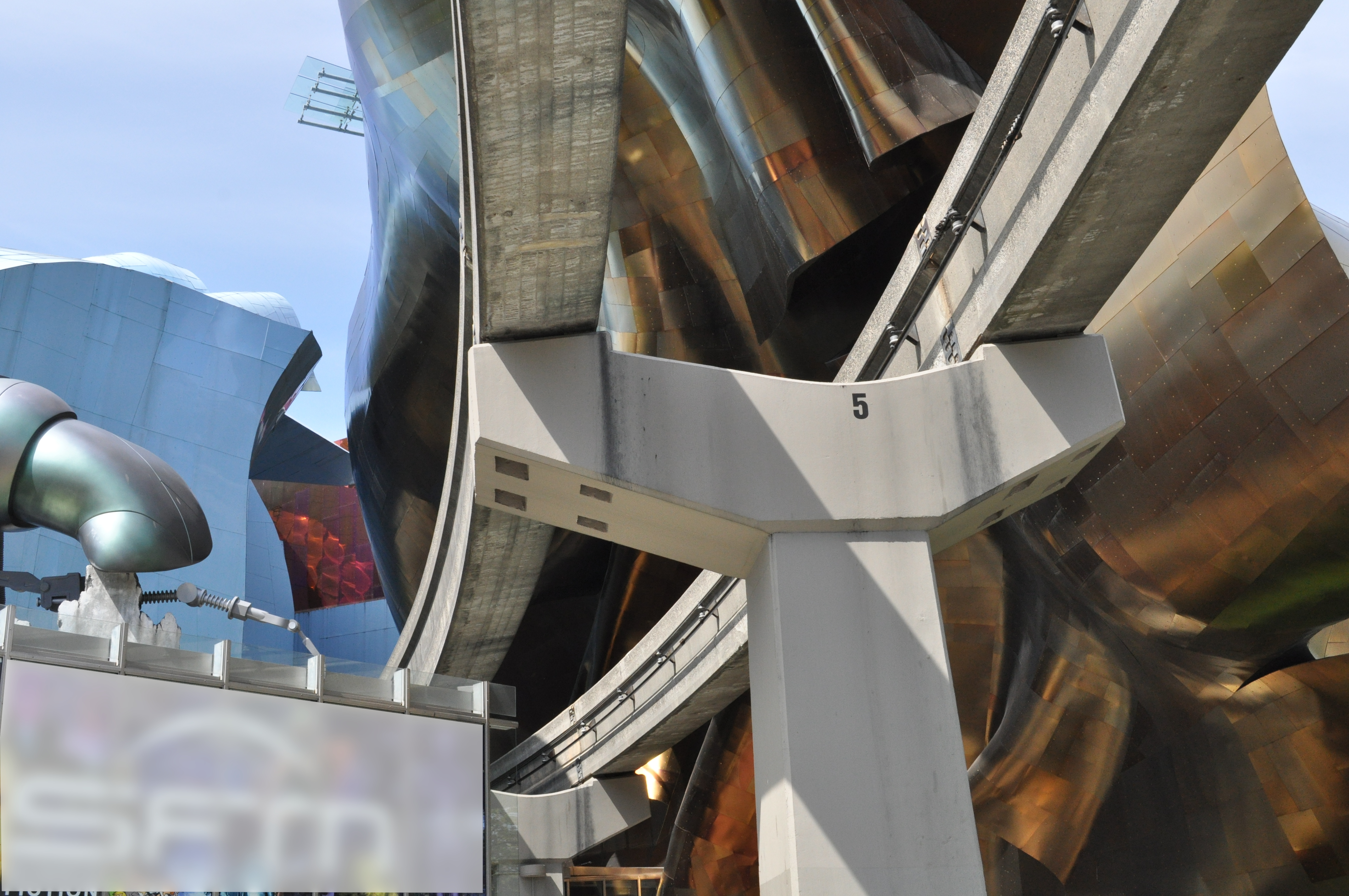
Monorail tracks entering the Museum of Pop Culture (MoPOP) building.

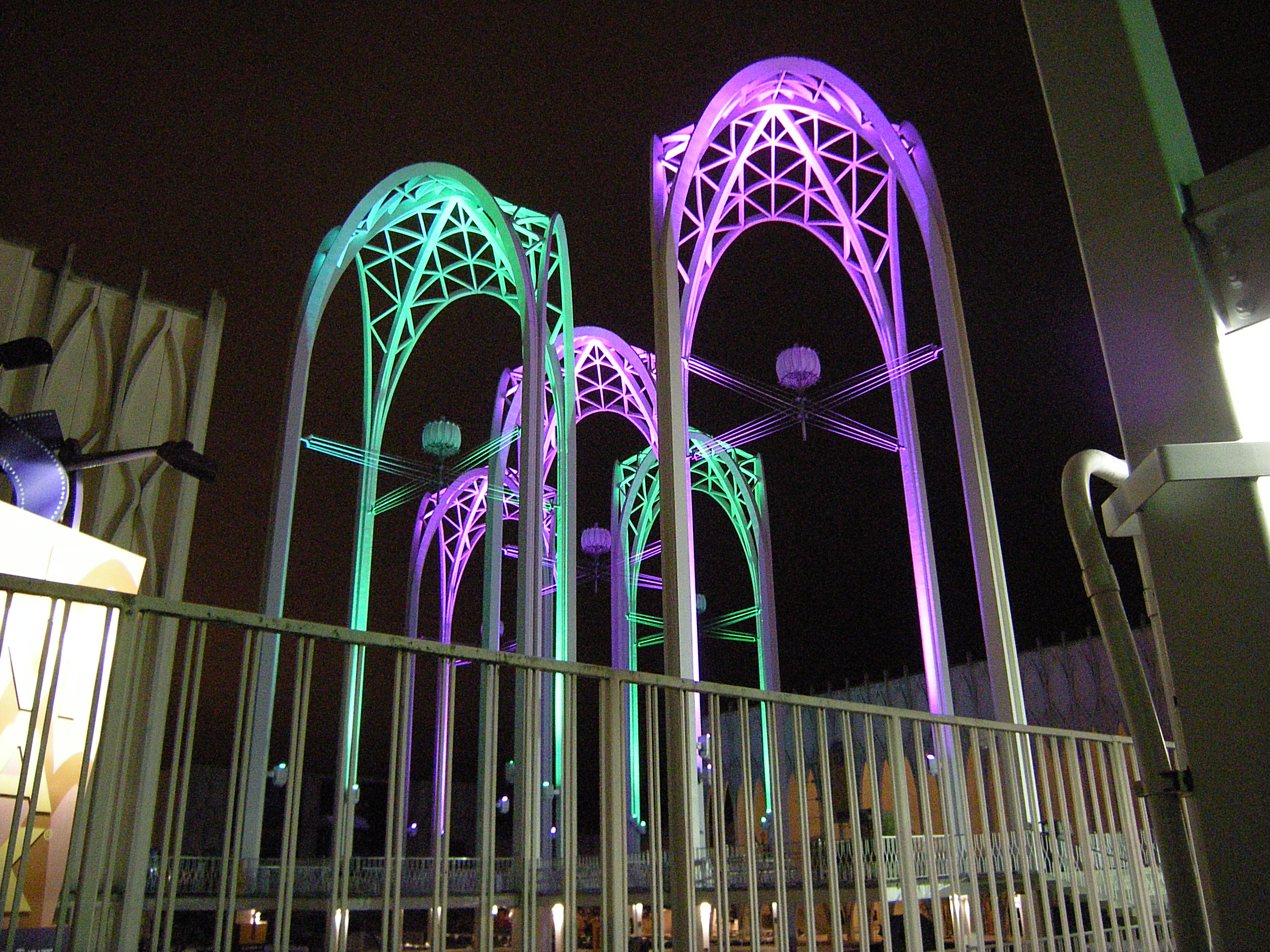
The towers of the Pacific Science Center at night.

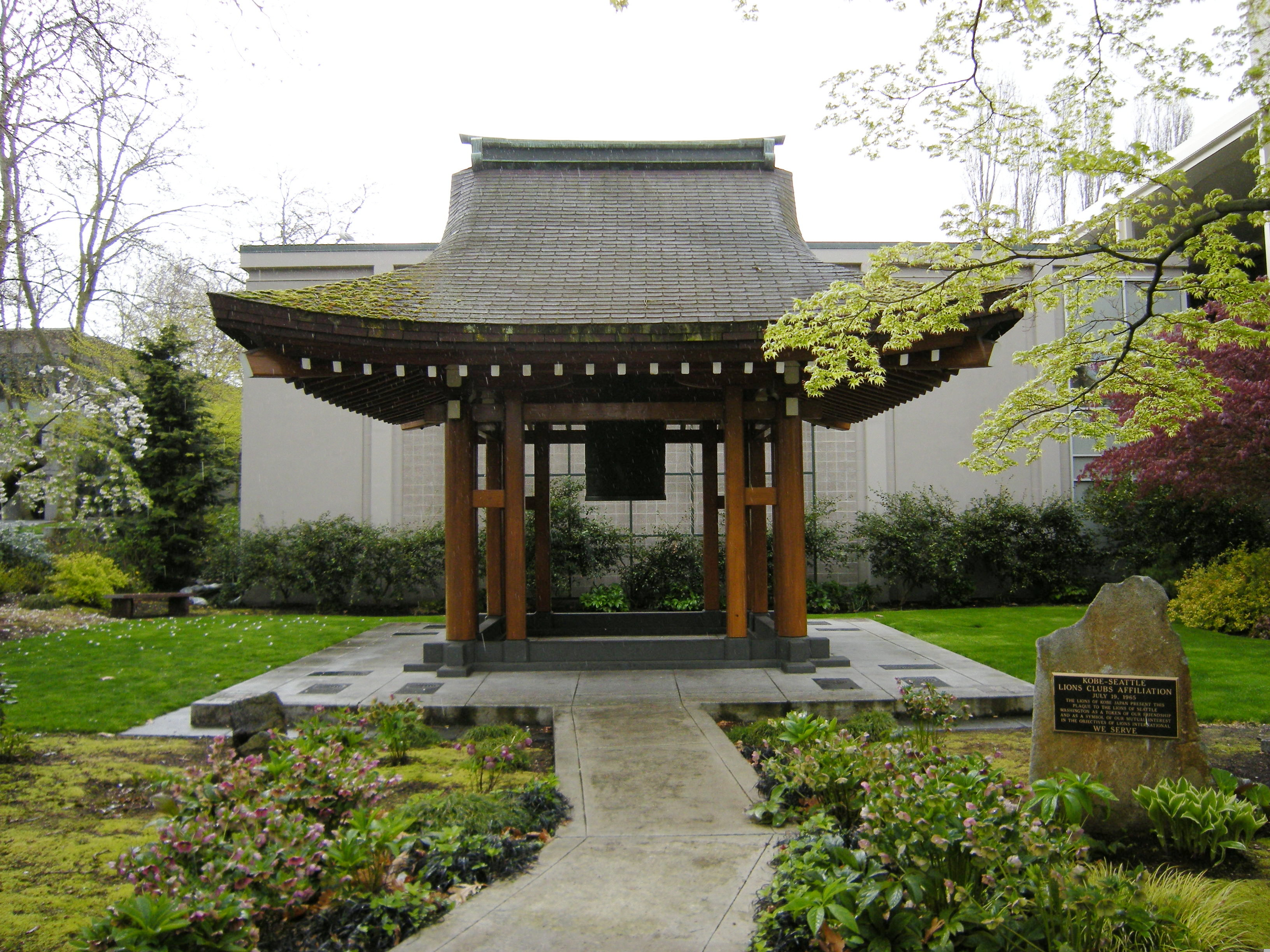
The Kobe Bell.

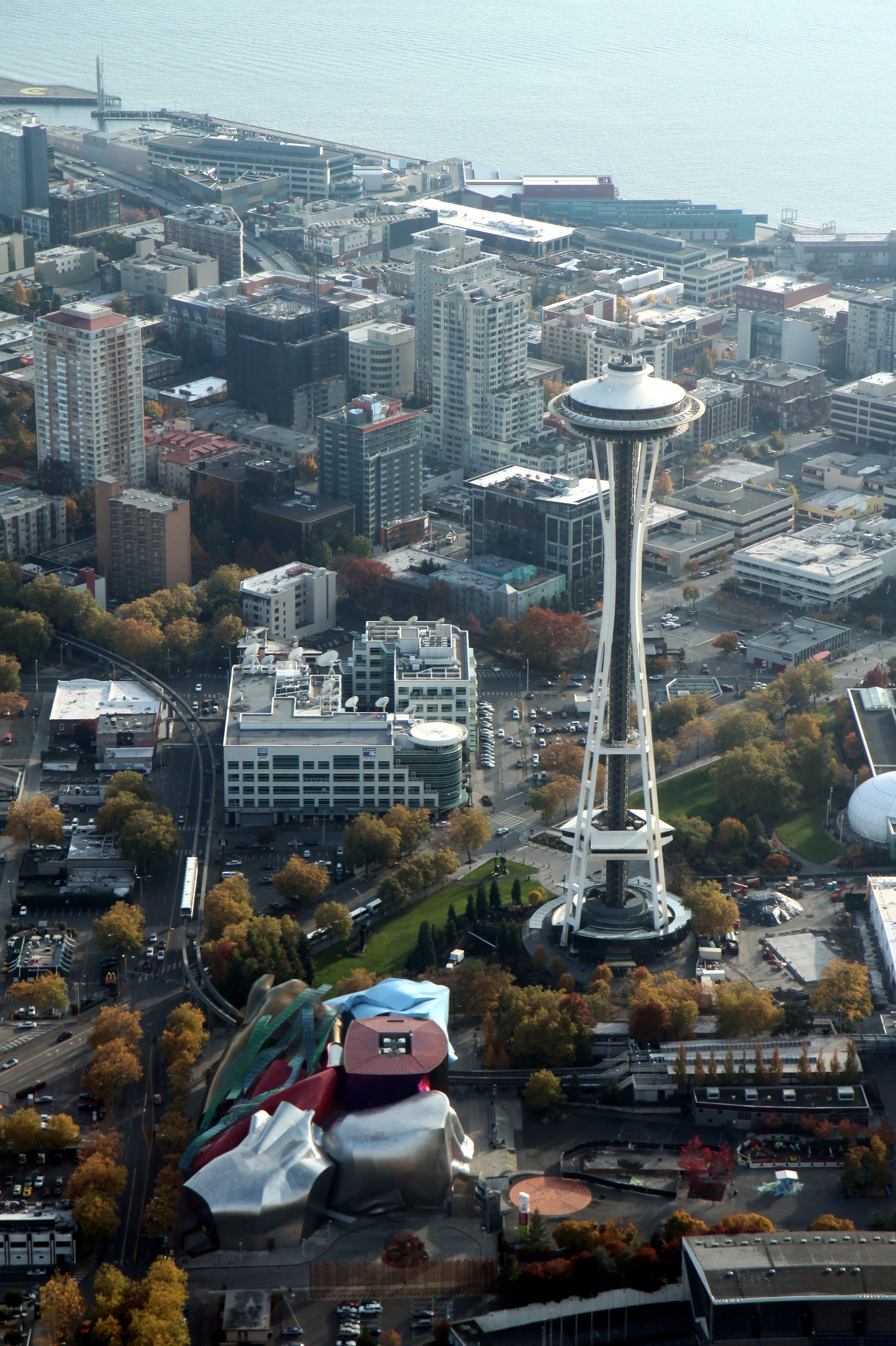
MoPOP and Space Needle seen against the backdrop of the Seattle waterfront and Puget Sound.
