= FoodieLand =

Food festival operator in the United States

- Type: Private
- Industry: Event management
- Headquarters: Berkeley, California
- Area served: United States
- Services: Food festival production

FoodieLand is a multicultural food festival operator based in Berkeley, California, United States. It operates approximately one dozen festivals in multiple U.S. states, including Arizona, California, Nevada, Oregon, Texas, and Washington. The business acquired the rights to Bite of Seattle in 2024.

== History ==
FoodieLand began operating food festivals in California before expanding its events to other states.

In Arizona, FoodieLand has been held in Phoenix. In California, FoodieLand has been held at Pasadena's Rose Bowl. The event has been described as the "largest annual outdoor food festival on the West Coast". Foodieland Night Market also operates in California.

In Nevada, FoodieLand has held a festival at the Las Vegas Motor Speedway. In Portland, Oregon, FoodieLand has been held at Portland Expo Center. In Austin, Texas, the business has held a festival at the Circuit of the Americas. The FoodieLand Festival in Houston has been held at Reliant Park.

== See also ==
- List of festivals in the United States
- Panda Fest
