= Kreielsheimer Promenade =

Plaza in Seattle, Washington, U.S.

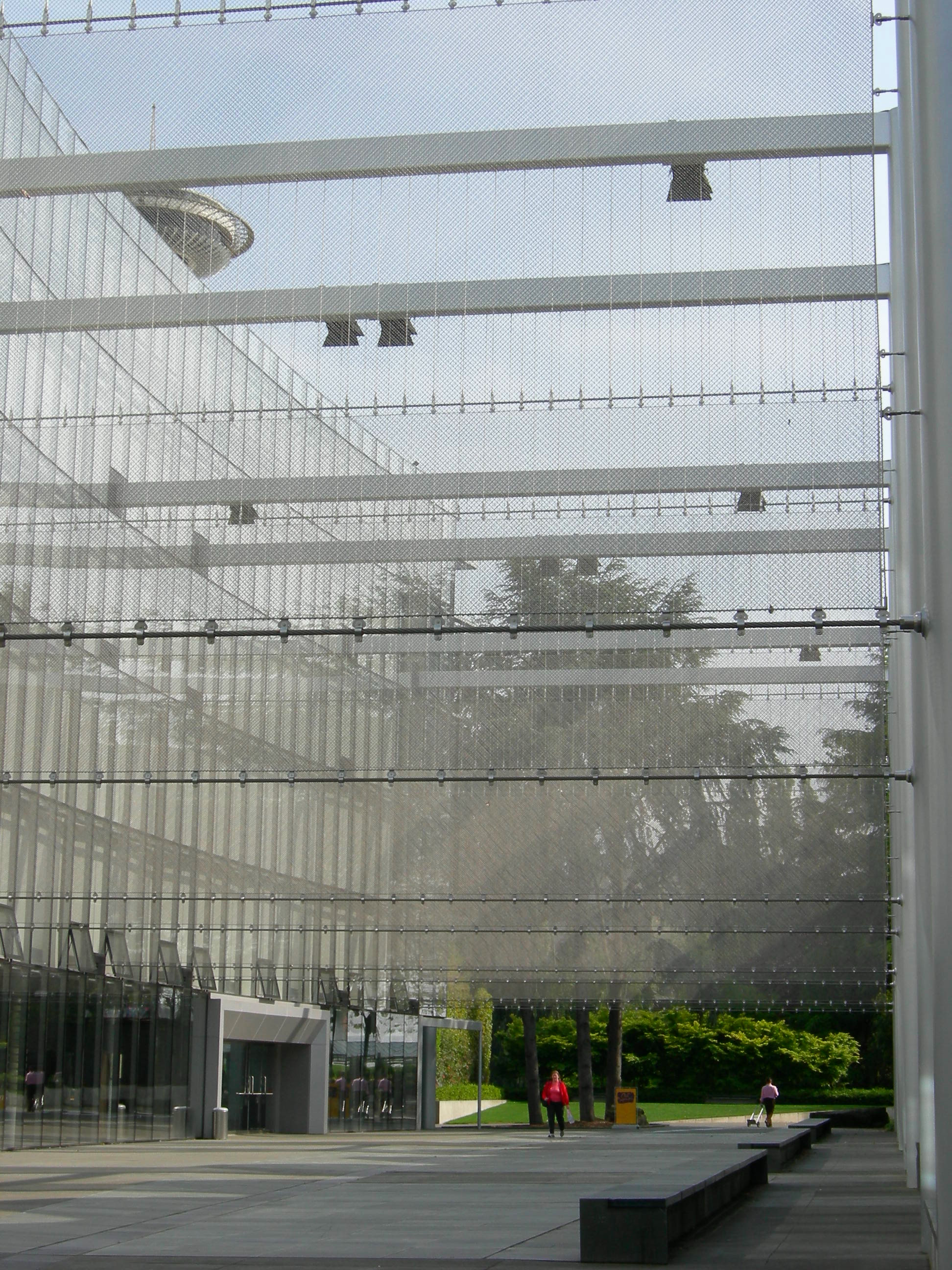
- Kreielsheimer Promenade in 2007
- Location: Seattle Center, Seattle, Washington, U.S.
- Location within Washington (state) Location within the United States
- Coordinates: 47°37′26.5″N 122°21′4″W

Kreielsheimer Promenade is a 17,800-square-foot public plaza in the Seattle Center, in the U.S. state of Washington. The plaza is an entry to McCaw Hall and a pedestrian corridor connecting the campus and Mercer Street.

The promenade features a series of large metal scrims as well as multiple artworks inside and outside the performance venue. It has been recognized by the American Society of Landscape Architects and the Seattle chapter of the American Institute of Architects.

== Description and history ==
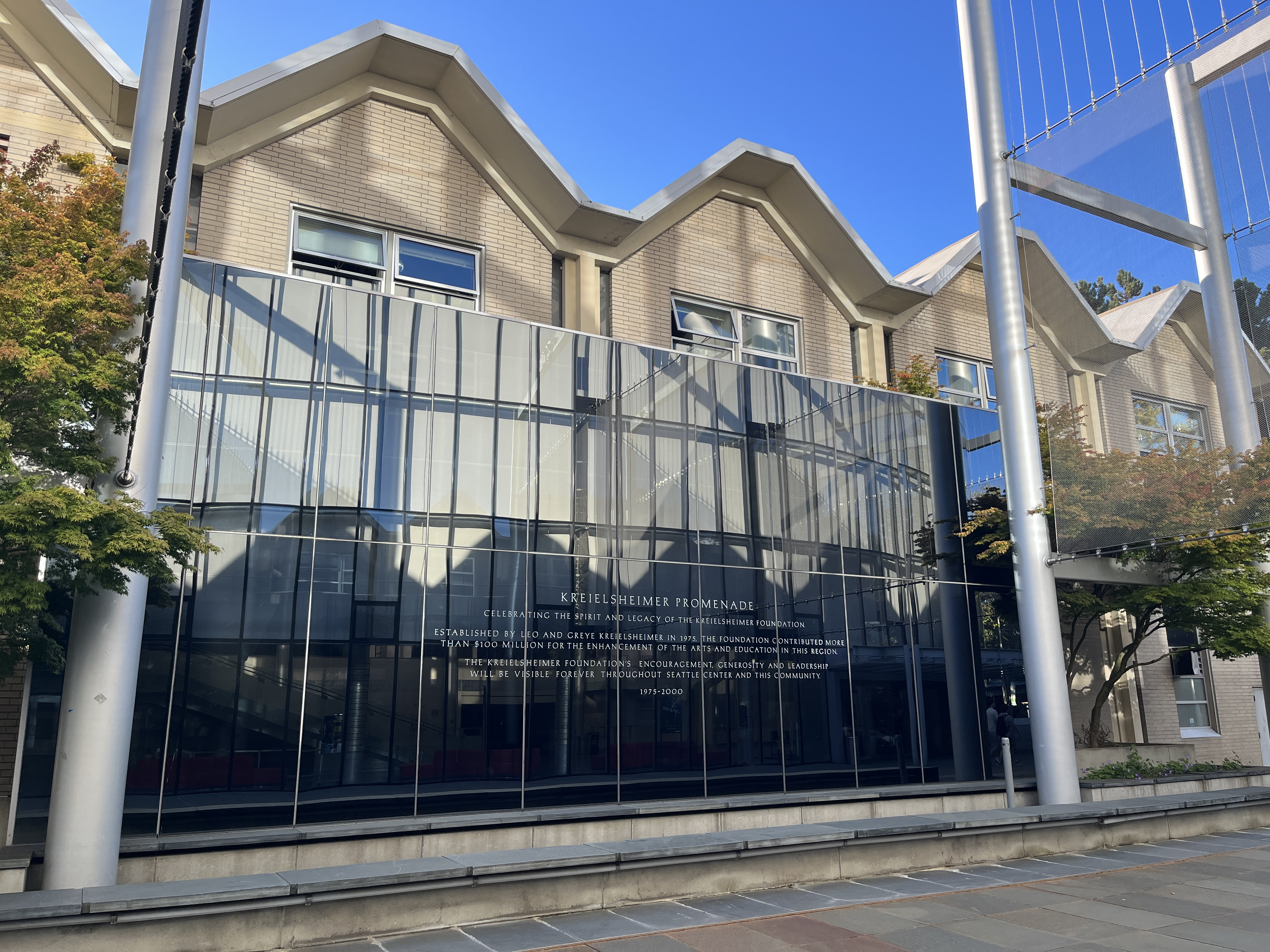
The promenade in 2023

Designed by Seattle-based firm Gustafson Guthrie Nichol, the plaza serves as an entry to McCaw Hall and connects Mercer Street to inner Seattle Center. It replaced the performance venue's former entry and interior ticket area.

Kreielsheimer Promenade has been described by the Seattle Post-Intelligencer as "an appealing indoor garden on the ground level and a series of towering metal scrims overhead onto which fields of color [are] projected, primarily on performance nights". The American Institute of Architects describes the promenade as a "subtly undulating, brightly lighted open space between two campus buildings".

The nine 30-foot-tall scrims are made of metal.

=== Landscaping and public art ===
The plaza has three shallow pools (including one called Underfoot), a terrazzo walkway, and outdoor seating. According to the Seattle Daily Journal of Commerce, "The landscape was built partially over mechanical rooms below, adding complexity to its design." Linda Hales of The Washington Post said the promenade "offers operagoers an opportunity to dip their Manolos in a quarter-inch sheet of water, which shimmers like glass, except when the water is turned off as a conservation measure". Kathryn Gustafson is credited as a designer of the landscapes and water features.

Dreaming in Color

The 2003 artwork Dreaming in Color by Leni Schwendinger features programmed lighting projected toward the scrims. The "three-dimensional environmental installation" has been used for special occasions; for example, teal lighting was used during September 2013 to commemorate National Ovarian Cancer Awareness month. The promenade was illuminated blue in 2020, during the COVID-19 pandemic, to commemorate first responders and health care workers. The work measures 45 x 30–50 x 150 feet (13.7 x 9.1–15.2 x 45.7 m).

Inside McCaw Hall, at the promenade's north end, the sculpture An Equal and Opposite Reaction by Sarah Szewith displays found objects over a staircase.

== Reception ==
The project received a Merit Award from the Washington chapter of the American Society of Landscape Architects (WASLA) in 2003, followed by an Honor Award from the Seattle chapter of the American Institute of Architects and a Tucker Design Award from the Building Stone Institute in 2004. It earned Gustafson Guthrie Nichol a national award of excellence from the American Society of Landscape Architects in 2005.
