= Kobe Bell =

Bell in Seattle, Washington, U.S.

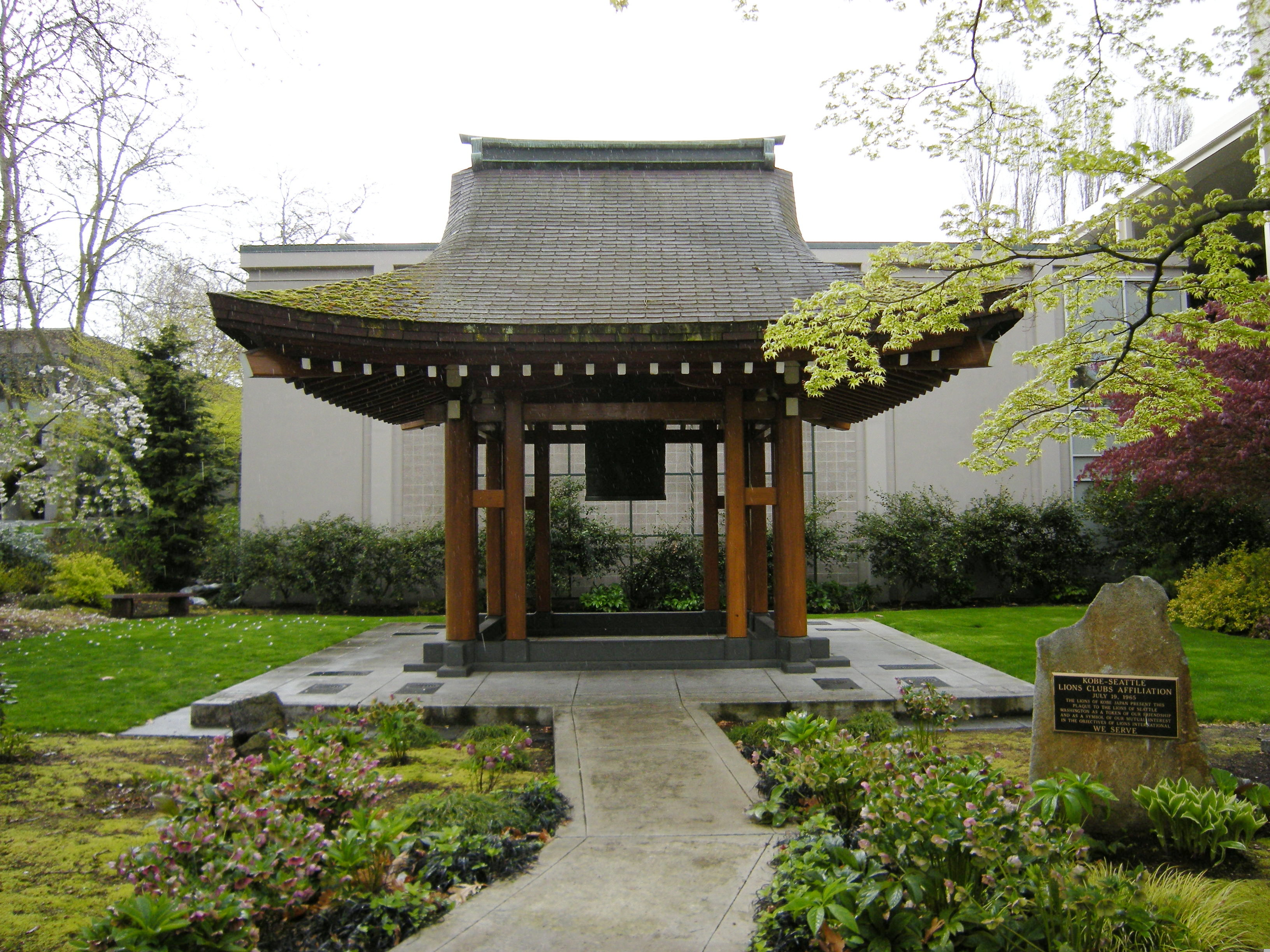
- The Kobe Bell in 2008
- Location: Seattle, Washington, U.S.
- Interactive map of Kobe Bell
- Coordinates: 47°37′24.6″N 122°21′7.9″W

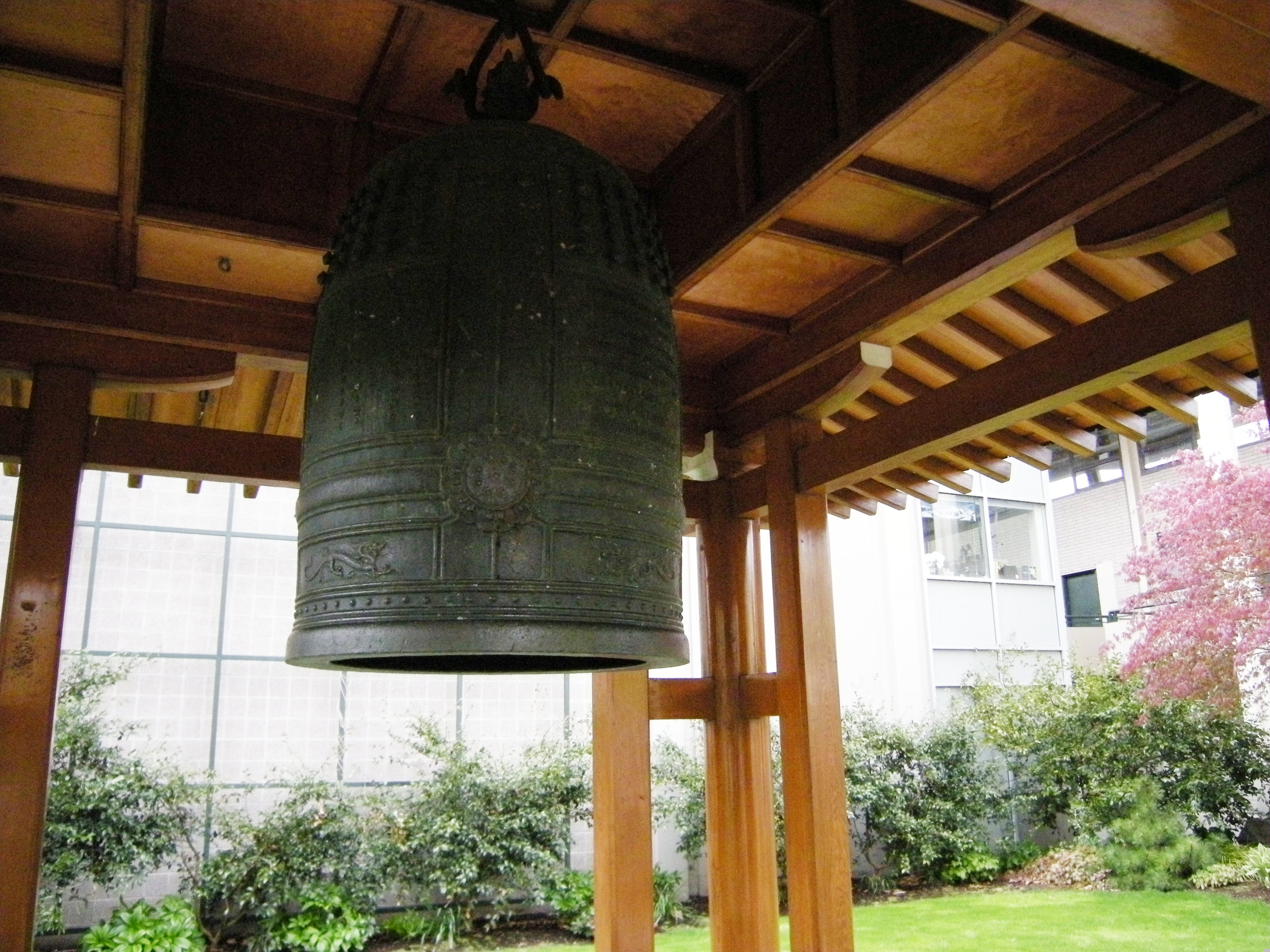
The bonshō

The Kobe Bell (also known as the Friendship Bell) is a ceremonial Japanese bonshō (bell) installed on the grounds of the Seattle Center in Seattle, Washington, United States.

The bell was presented as a gift to the people of Seattle by the people of Kobe, Japan, in commemoration of the 1962 Seattle World's Fair and Kobe's status as Seattle's first sister city. It is made of ornamented bronze and housed inside a wooden shōrō. It contains a dedication written in both Japanese and English:

"Presented by the People of Kobe to the People of Seattle as a Symbol of Friendship. May this bell ring forever signifying friendship between the nations of the United States and Japan."

The bell is recognized as a Seattle Historic Site.
