= Bite of Seattle =

Annual food festival in Seattle, Washington, U.S.

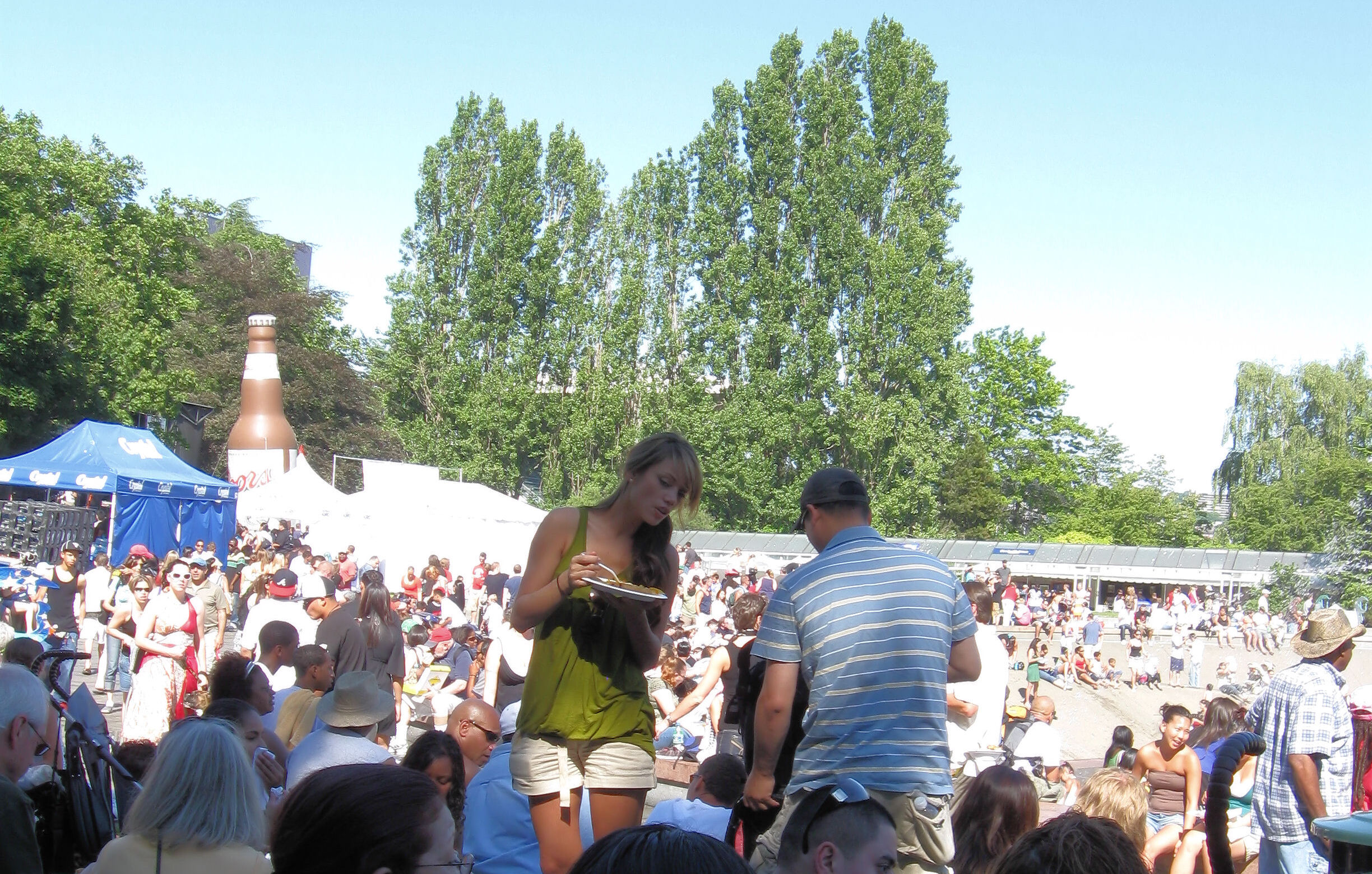
- Crowds at the 2008 Bite of Seattle event
- Status: Active
- Genre: Food festival
- Frequency: Annual
- Locations: Seattle Center; Seattle, Washington, U.S.
- Years active: 1982–2019, 2023–
- Next event: July 25-27, 2027
- Attendance: 400,000
- Website: biteofseattle.com

The Bite of Seattle is an annual food festival held in Seattle, Washington, U.S. It takes place at the Seattle Center. Locally, the festival is known as "The Bite". It is held on one weekend during the month of July, and is considered to be one of Seattle's largest food and beverage events with over 200 participating vendors.

== History ==
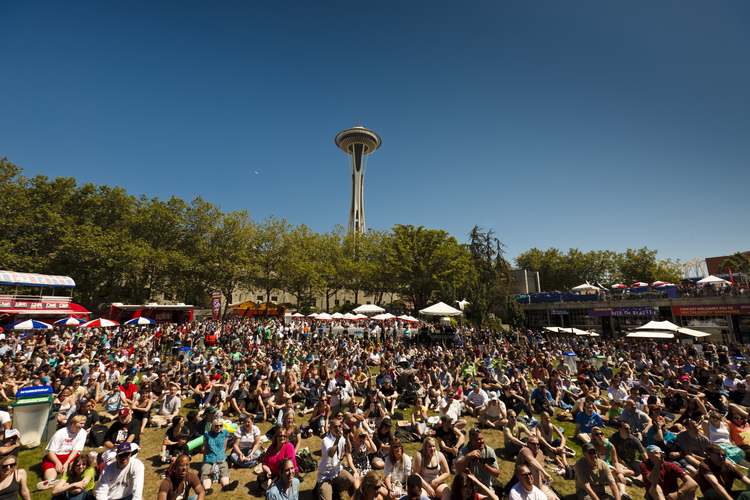
View over Seattle Center during the 2010 event, with the Space Needle in the background

Back in July 1982, Alan Silverman, the president of Festivals, Inc., founded the festival which was originally held at Green Lake Park. Initially, it was expected that roughly 25,000 people would attend, but there were 25 restaurants participating and 75,000 people in attendance. In 2006 there were 60 restaurants and food vendors participating and over 425,000 visitors.

The 2020 Bite of Seattle and Taste of Tacoma were both cancelled due to the COVID-19 pandemic. In 2023, CHEQ, a mobile payments platform company, brought the Bite of Seattle back after two years of hiatus. The 2023 event was panned by attendees due to the CHEQ app's poor functionality.'

=== 2026 shooting ===
On July 26, 2026, a deadly shootout occurred at the event, killing three people and injuring four. As a result, Seattle Center was evacuated, and the Seattle monorail was shut down for the rest of Sunday, July 26 and reopened on July 27.

== Attractions ==
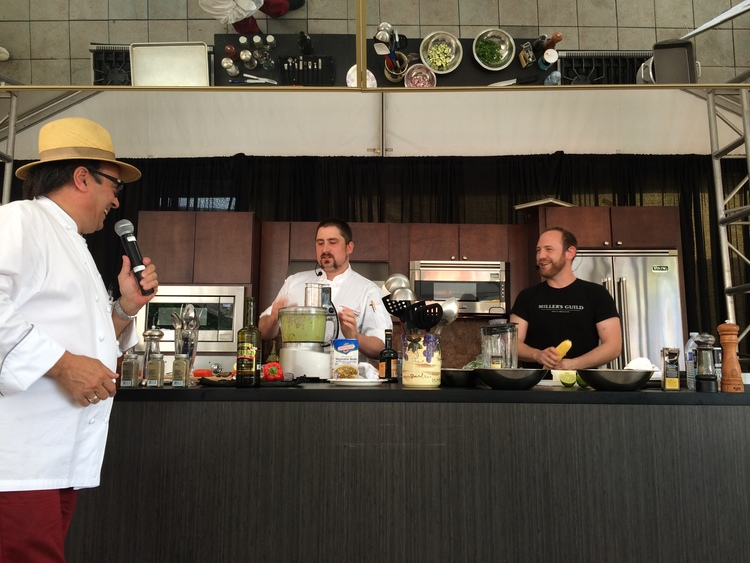
Cook-off at the 2010 event, one of the Bite's attractions

The Bite offers many attractions, including food sampling from local restaurants, food cook-off competitions, eating competitions, new foods and vendors, commercial vendors, traveling tours, child-friendly activities and local chefs showcasing their cooking. There are also many activities and entertainment options unrelated to food, which include live entertainment, stage performances, a free movie night, craft beer & cider tasting, and beer gardens.

Bite of Seattle hosts over 80 live bands that play on stage, primarily local and regional artists. These performances are usually held at one of the three main stages: either the Fountain Lawn Stage, the Mural Stage, or the Fisher Green Stage.

== See also ==
- FoodieLand
