= International Fountain =

Fountain and sculpture in Seattle, Washington, U.S.

- Public fountain
- {{{other_names}}}
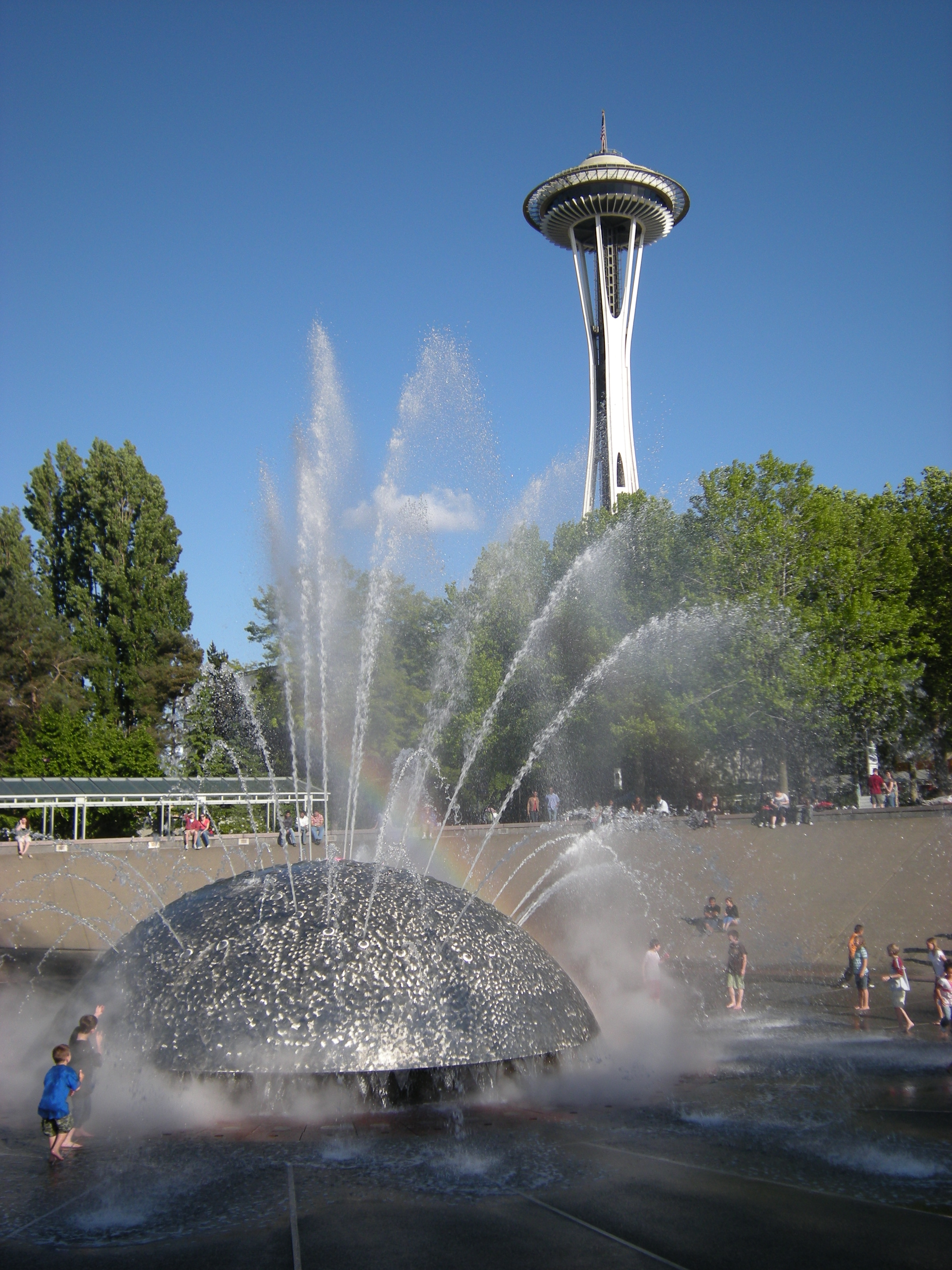
- Design: Kazuyuki Matsushita, Hideki Shimizu (1962); WET Design, TRA, Nakano/Dennis (1995)
- Opened: 1962
- Owner: City of Seattle
- Location: Seattle Center; 305 Harrison Street, Seattle
- Location within Washington (state)
- Coordinates: 47.622518°N 122.352014°W

The International Fountain is a concrete fountain and sculpture installed in Seattle Center in the U.S. state of Washington, designed by Tokyo-based architects Kazuyuki Matsushita and Hideki Shimizu during 1961–1962 for the Century 21 Exposition (also known as the Seattle World's Fair).

== Design ==
The International Fountain was built on the site of the former Mercer Playground in Seattle's Queen Anne neighborhood. Mercer Playground had stood at that location since the 1910s. During the planning for Century 21, Mercer Playground was identified as the central site of "The Boulevards of the World", which was to be the centerpiece of the fair. The initial design concept called for a narrow lagoon with gondolas and crossed by a bridge, but a design competition was held for a "light, water and sculpture display" in the summer of 1960. Matsushita and Shimizu submitted the winning design, a fountain designed to reflect "mankind's efforts to explore the farthest reaches of outer space." The 1960 design eschewed sculptural decorations in favor of water jets and the parabolic shapes they produced.

From the beginning, we have set about this fountain design with a view to putting sole stress upon water itself — its shape and movement — without recourse to any sculpture or accessories. ... The water which springs up from each nozzle describes a primitive, ordinary parabola. But when the parabolas are varied and gathered methodically, it shows a mighty and bountiful spectacle. Furthermore lively feeling can be expressed in the swelling curved phases of water by opening and shutting nozzle cocks at different time lag. Such beauty and might are expressed only by means of water, which may be called, in its true sense of the work, a fountain.

— Matsushita and Shimizu, Report of Seattle Civic Center Fountain Contest (c.1962)

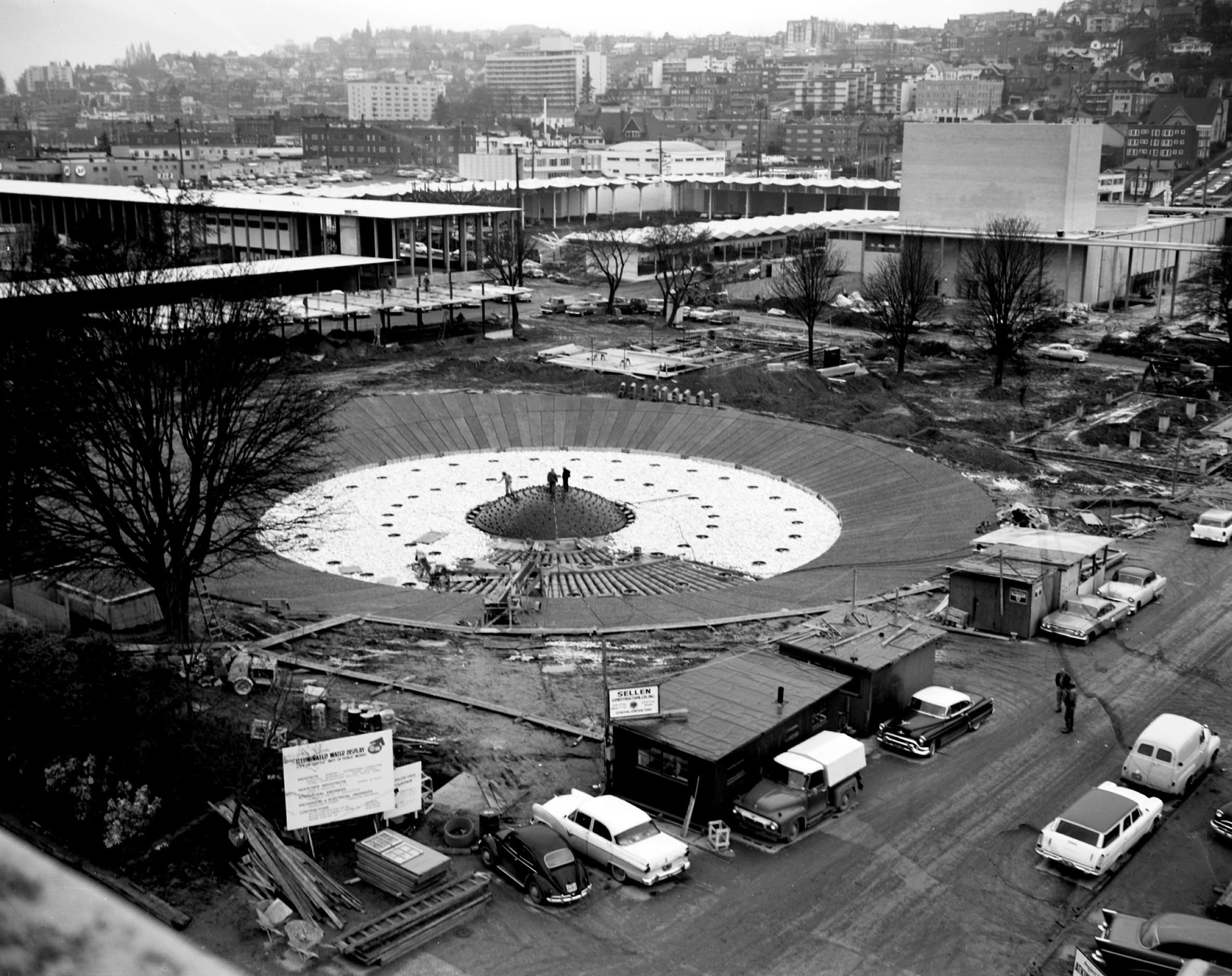
Under construction (1962)

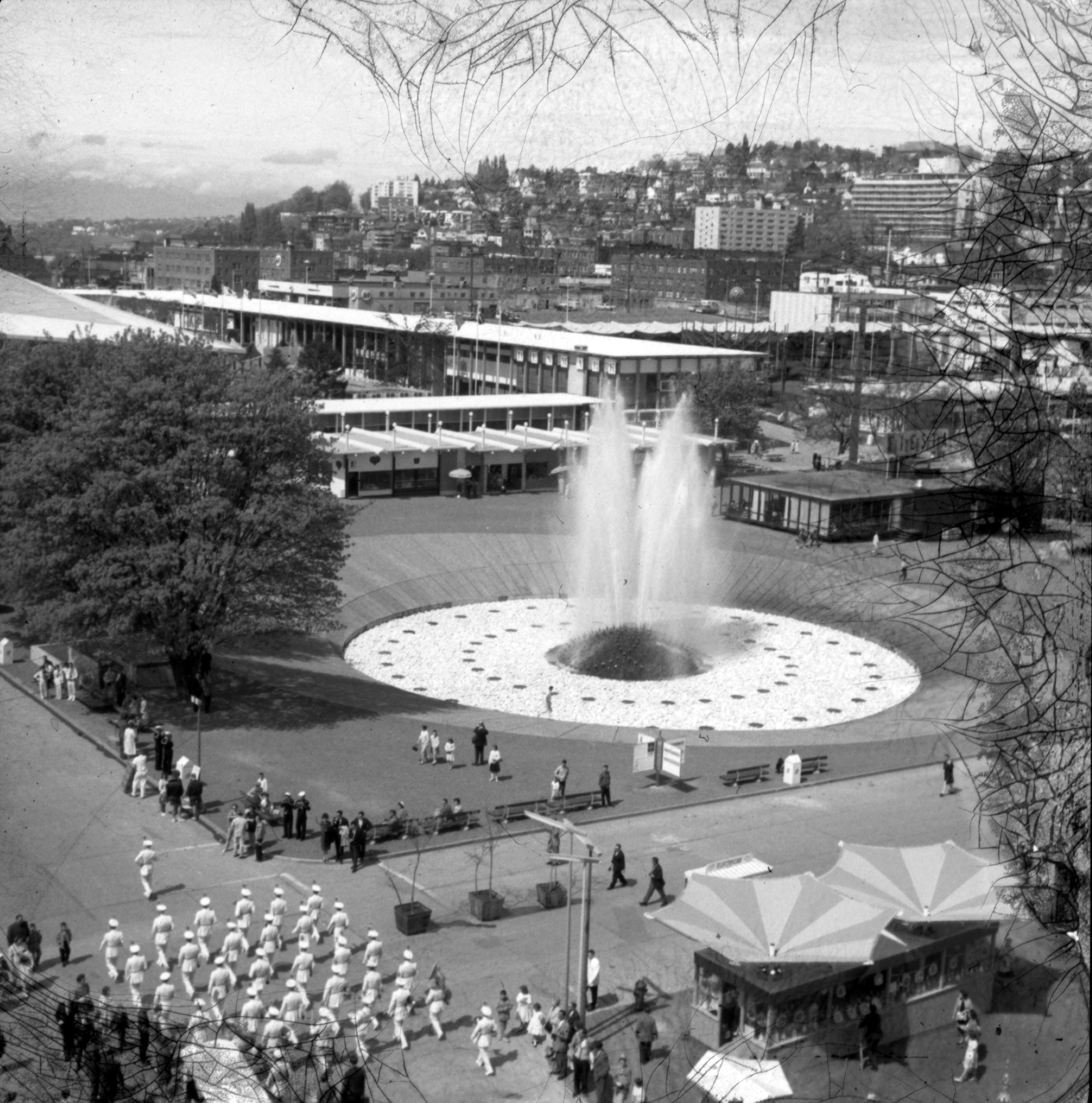
In operation (1962)

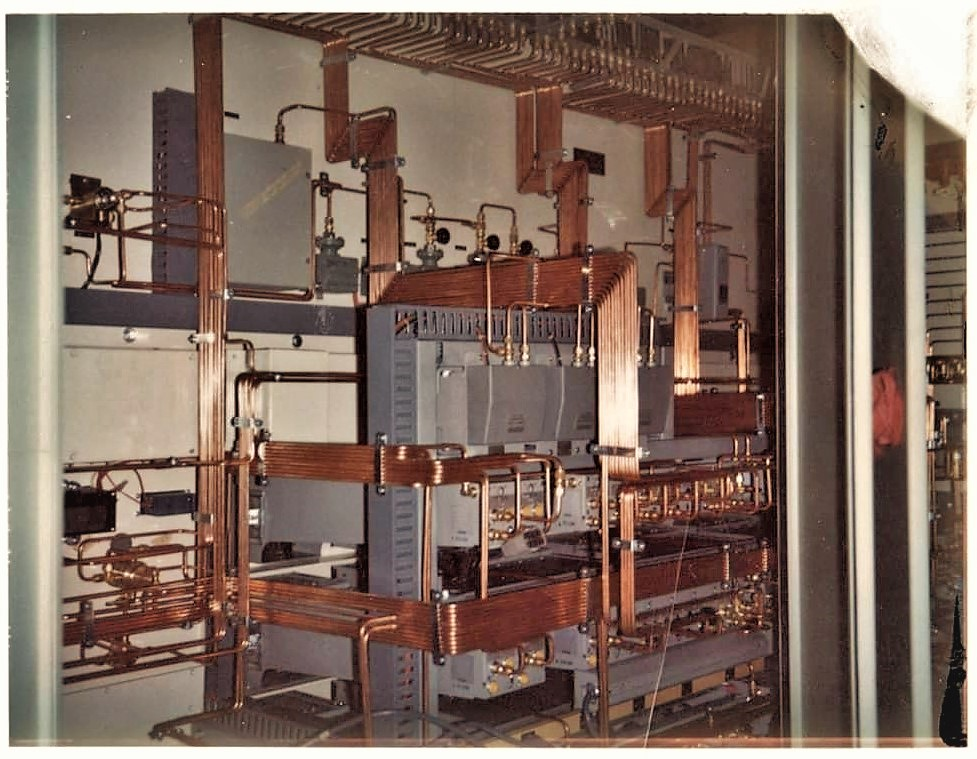
Fountain Pump Works (1962)

The competition received 261 entries, of which 72 were international and 189 came from the United States. In the first stage of the competition, the jury narrowed the entries down to five finalists, each of which received a US$2,000 (equivalent to $22,000 in 2025) prize. The jury, which consisted of noted architects and sculptors Nathaniel A. Owings, Bernard Rosenthal, Garrett Eckbo, Peter Oberlander, Paul Thiry, and Fred McCoy, selected Matsushita and Shimizu unanimously from the five finalists. One juror commented "I feel that the scheme is not just good ... it's a big scheme, it's a terrific scheme ... and I think that the fact that he didn't have a model, when the other four did, and that he still got the winning vote is indicative of the fact that it is so outstanding ... I feel that this human experience has to happen; can happen in many ways." At the time of selection, Matsushita was 29 and Shimizu was 26, and both were employed as associate architects with Taisei Construction Company in Tokyo. For their winning design, Matsushita and Shimizu were awarded US$20,000 (equivalent to $218,000 in 2025).

=== 1995 rebuild ===
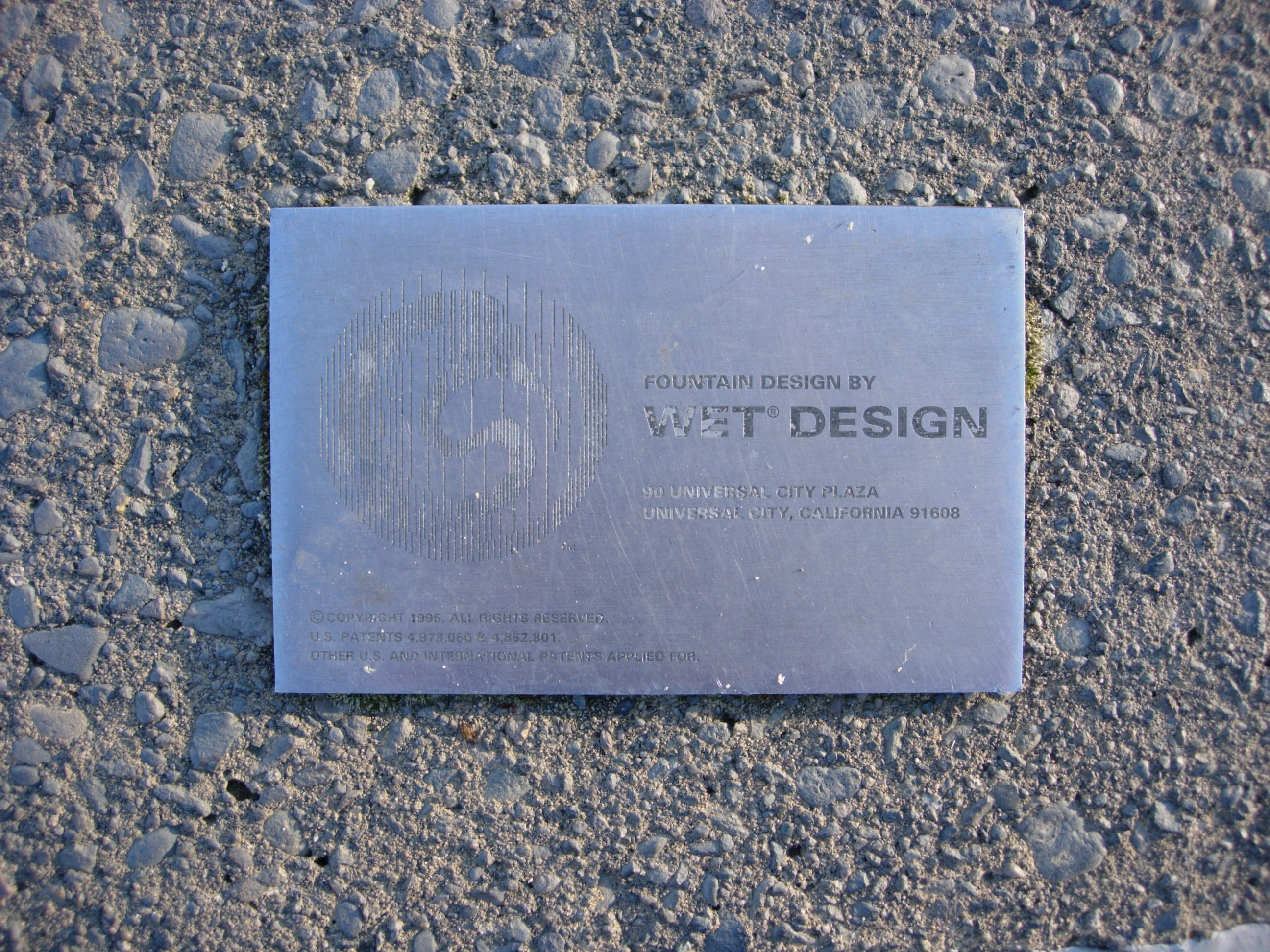
WET plaque noting 1995 rebuild and patents (2006)

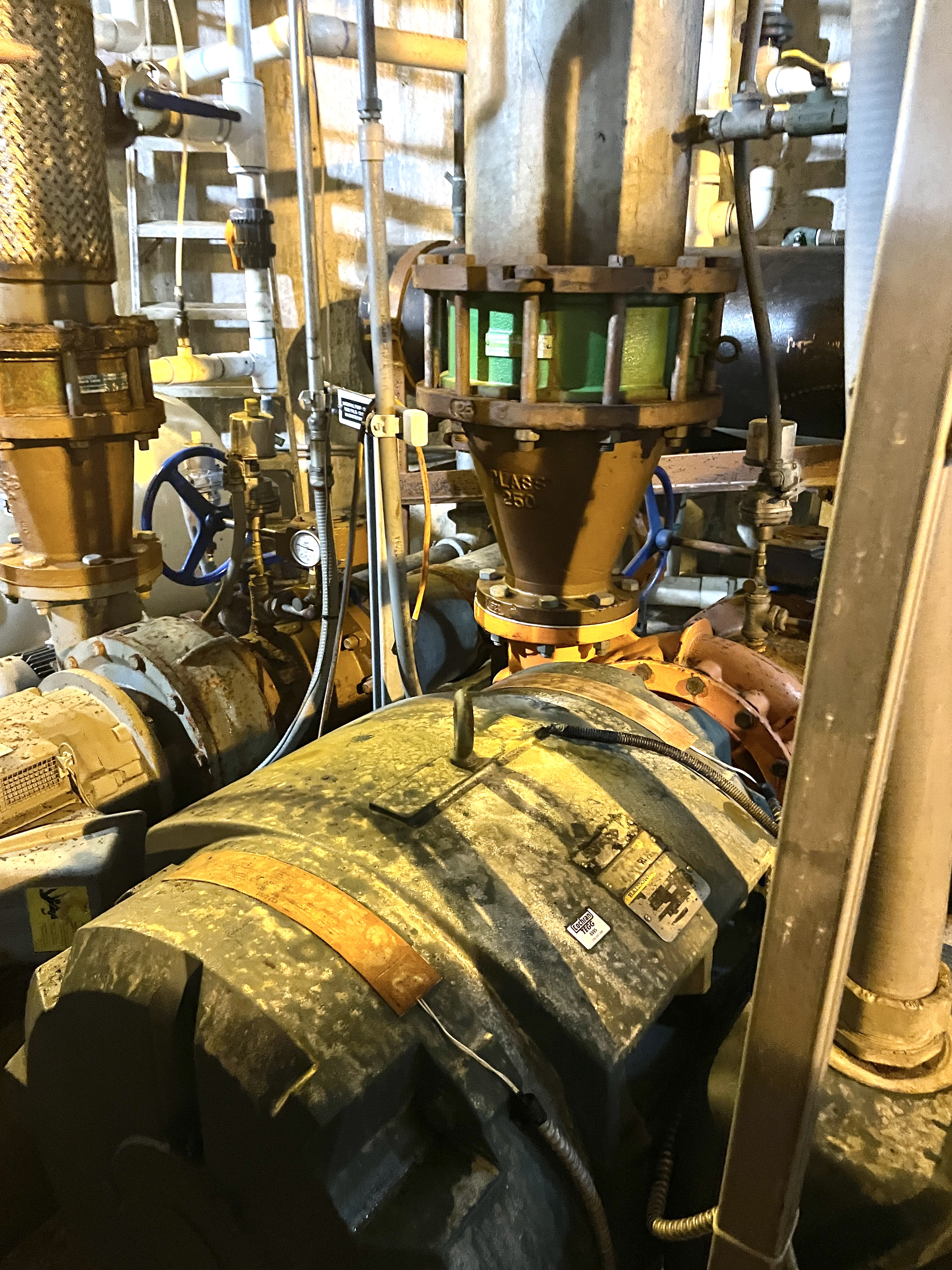
Pump of International Fountain as seen in 2023

The fountain was rebuilt in 1995 by WET Design as part of $6.5 million project including landscape design by Kenichi Nakano. Prior to 1995, the central dome had protruding nozzles and was surrounded by irregular white rocks to recreate a "lunar landscape", discouraging people from interacting with the water features. After the 1995 rebuild, the rocks were removed and the dome was reconfigured with myriad jets nearly flush with the dome's surface, allowing visitors to approach and play with the fountain.

The fountain is controlled remotely from the north side of Seattle Center, and the pumping machinery is contained 30 feet (9.1 m) below the fountain floor. Two moats of water feed the jets: one moat for the "micro shooters" and another moat for the "fleur-de-lis" and "super shooters". The fountain recirculates the water and filters it through sand. During certain times of the day, the water display is synchronized to music for up to twelve minutes. The fountain jet designs are patented by WET.

=== 2021 refresh ===
Beginning April 6, 2021, the fountain was closed until June 30, 2021, for a refresh to the area. Updates include:

- Re-Caulking of the bowl
- Replacing the floodlights between the micro shooters with colored LED lights.
- Updates to micro shooters
- Replacement of control panel, and anemometer responsible for controlling the fountain's height based on wind speed
- Switching power from AC to DC

=== Statistics ===
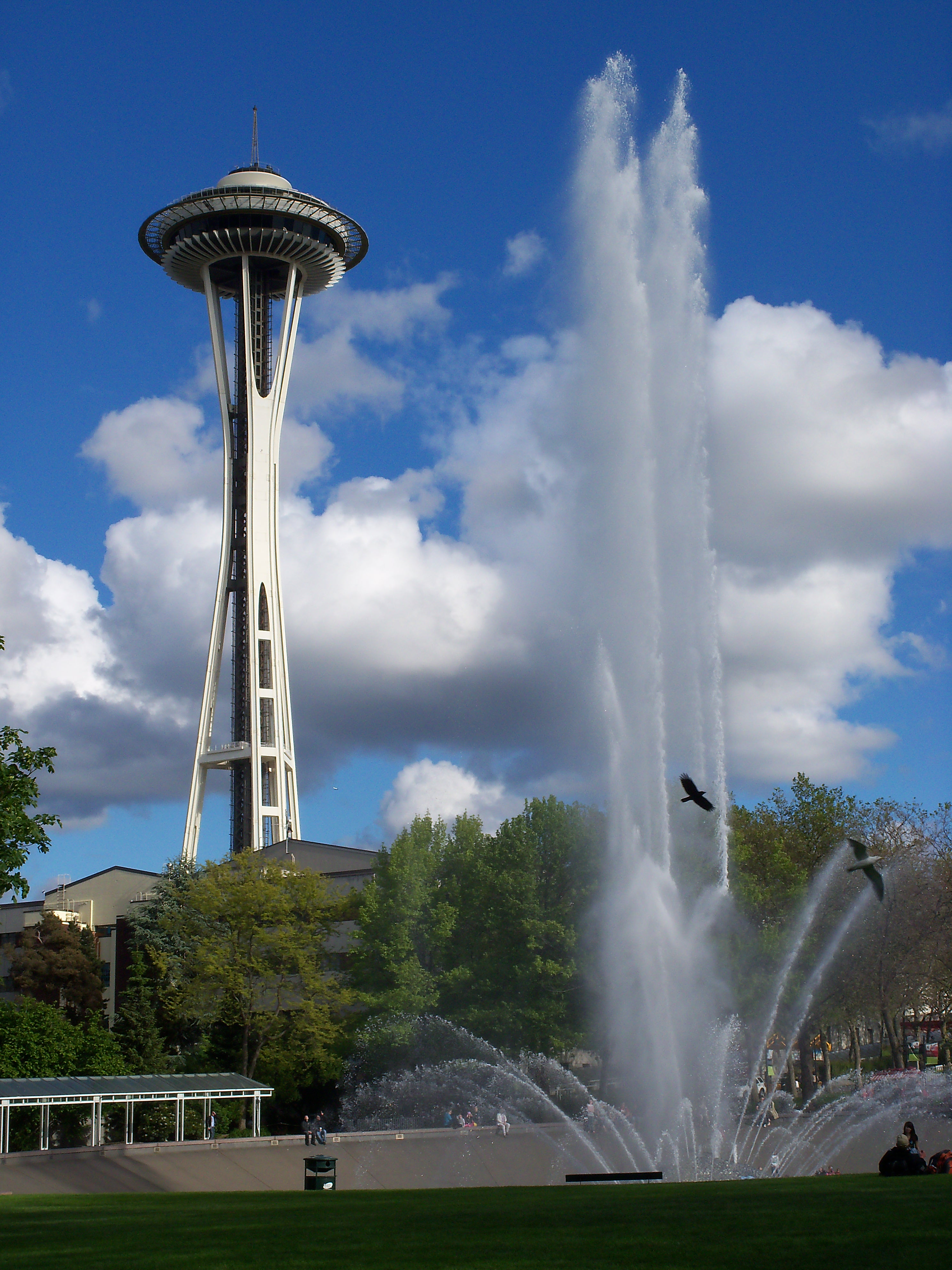
Peak height (2010)

In 1962, the basin was 185 feet (56 m) in diameter, surrounding a dome 6 feet (1.8 m) high and 30 feet (9.1 m) in diameter covered in dark amber glass with 465 nozzles, of which 117 were active. The fountain is lit with floodlamps set in the floor.

Following the 1995 rebuild, the fountain is contained in a bowl 220 feet (67 m) in diameter, and the dome was rebuilt in stainless steel to 10 feet (3.0 m) tall and 27 feet (8.2 m) in diameter. Total capacity of the fountain is 9,000 US gallons (34,000 L). The water jets are arranged as follows:

- 56 "Micro shooters" arrayed as a ring buried in the granite blocks of the fountain floor, on the outer perimeter surrounding the dome. These shoot straight up.
- 77 "Fleur-de-lis" - plate-sized nozzles on the dome, shooting medium-high arcs.
- 4 "Super shooters" - four nozzles on the top of the dome capable of shooting up to 120 feet (37 m) high. Each "super shooter" peak shot uses 66 US gallons (250 L) and is driven by 120 pounds per square inch (830 kPa) of air pressure.
- 137 "Mist nozzles", each with an opening the size of a pinhead to generate fog

There is an additional ring of floodlights between the "micro shooters" and the dome.

== See also ==
- 1962 in art
