= Arts in Seattle =

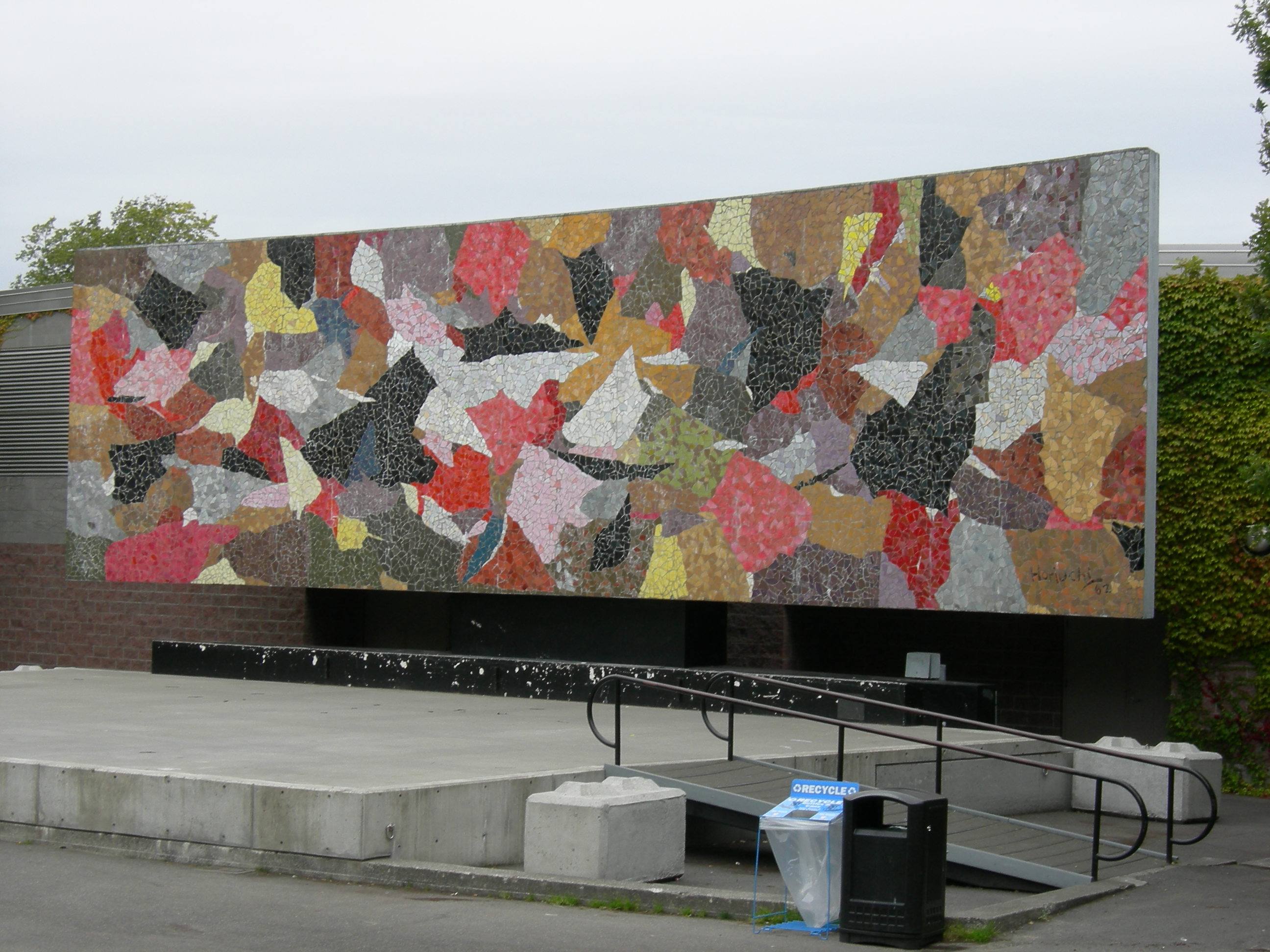
Mural Amphitheater, Seattle Center (built 1962). The mosaic behind the stage is by Seattle artist Paul Horiuchi.

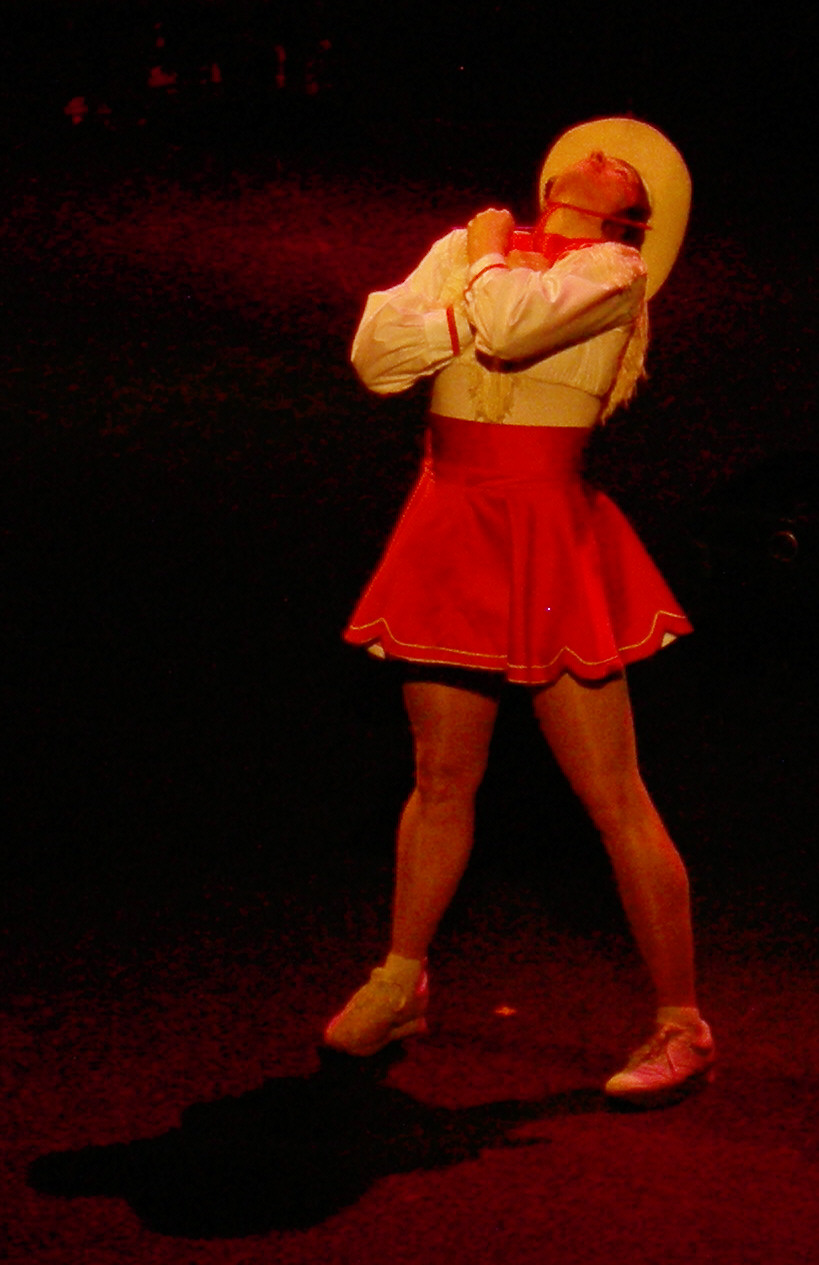
Dancer Kara O'Toole performing an excerpt from choreographer Pat Graney's Jesus Loves the Little Cowgirls at the celebration of the 100th anniversary of Seattle's Moore Theatre (2007)

Seattle is a significant center for the painting, sculpture, textile and studio glass, alternative, urban art, lowbrow (art movement) and performing arts. The century-old Seattle Symphony Orchestra is among the world's most recorded orchestras. The Seattle Opera and Pacific Northwest Ballet, are comparably distinguished. On at least two occasions, Seattle's local popular music scene has burst into the national and even international consciousness, first with a major contribution to garage rock in the mid-1960s, and later as the home of grunge rock in the early 1990s. The city has about twenty live theater venues, and Pioneer Square is one of the country's most prominent art gallery districts.

== 19th century ==
The entertainments in Seattle in its first decade were typical of similar frontier towns. The first established place of entertainment was Henry Yesler's one-story 30 feet (9.1 m) x 100 feet (30.5 m) hall (built 1865), which hosted monologuists, Swiss bellringers, phrenologists and the like. The first professional play in the city was an 1871 production of Uncle Tom's Cabin; numerous Tom Shows would play Seattle in the following years, including one with an entirely African American cast. The first local theater company was the short-lived John Jack Theatrical Company, whose performances in the late 1870s received generally unfavorable reviews.

By the 1880s, Seattle was receiving touring opera companies, as well as trained animal acts and the like. Among the actors who visited in the 1890s were Henry Irving, Maurice and Lionel Barrymore, Sidney Drew and Mrs. John Drew, Harry Langdon, W.C. Fields, Eddie Foy, and Sarah Bernhardt. Less reputably, the "restricted district" below Yesler Way became home to many box houses: half antecedent of vaudeville, half bawdyhouse.

The Ladies Musical Club, founded 1891, quickly became an institution. Active members had to pass an audition. Well into the 20th century it would play a prominent part role in Seattle culture, and still exists as of 2023.

The Panic of 1893 nearly destroyed Seattle theater. Immediately before the Yukon Gold Rush brought new wealth to Seattle late in the decade, only the Seattle Theater and the Third Avenue Theater survived, both booked by New York-based Klaw & Erlanger (K&E), and neither getting any of K&E's choicer acts. Even the box house operators had left for greener pastures. Once Seattle became the main supply center for Yukon prospectors, cash from the miners brought back the box houses.

== Early 20th century ==
Success in the Gold Rush era made several box house entrepreneurs think of grander things. John Considine and Alexander Pantages pioneered vaudeville circuits; John Cort became a leading impresario of legitimate theater, at one time controlling more quality theaters around the country than anyone else in America. It would be many decades before Seattle ever again had a comparable impact on American arts and entertainment to what it had in these years.

Seattle theater around 1910 included stock shows at the Alhambra and at Pantages' Lois Theater, and vaudeville at Pantages' Crystal and Pantages theaters and at Considine's Orpheum and Star. Cort and others presented various "quality" entertainment at the Moore and Grand Opera House. In addition, the Dream Theater presented silent films with pipe organ accompaniment. The Metropolitan Theatre opened in the Metropolitan Tract in 1911. Owned by New York-based K&E, it was the grandest theater Seattle had seen up to that time. But the 1912 economic downturn led to a marked decrease in this activity.

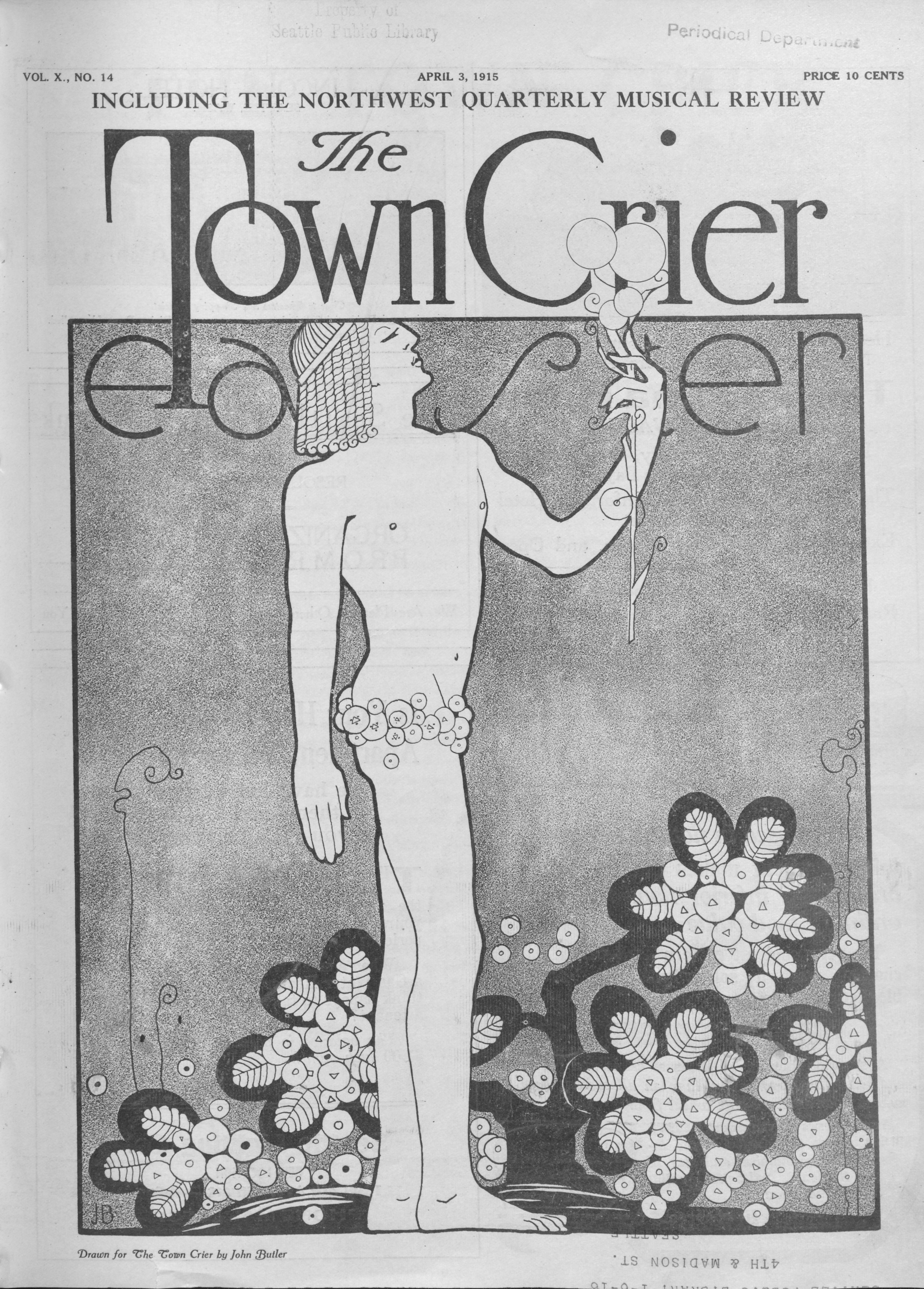
Butler's illustration on the cover of the Easter 1915 edition of Seattle magazine The Town Crier.

Although Seattle in the early 20th century was more of a center for variety shows and vaudeville than for the high arts, the Seattle Symphony Orchestra (SSO) was founded in 1903. Nor was the SSO alone: there were two separate Seattle Musical Arts societies, a Schubert Society, and a Seattle Choral Symphony. The Ladies Musical Club was particularly prominent in bringing world-class performers to Seattle; a pinnacle among their programming was a 1908 concert where Fritz Kreisler and Harold Bauer performed Beethoven's Kreutzer Sonata, Brahms' Paganini Variations, Schubert's Moments Musicaux, and Schumann's Fantasiestücke.

The Cornish School—later the Cornish Institute and now Cornish College of the Arts, an accredited college with courses in the sciences and humanities as well—was founded in 1914 by Nellie Cornish, a member of the Ladies Musical Club. Initially a music school, but later equally known for dance, theater, and visual arts, it thrived for decades under her leadership; although its quality slackened after her death, it eventually recovered and remains an important arts education institution to this day.

With no art museums at this time, Seattle played a less prominent role in the visual arts, although Seattle-based Edward S. Curtis and his onetime assistant Imogen Cunningham (who spent about a decade in Seattle) were important in establishing photography as an art form. Other Seattle visual artists in this era included Cunningham's husband Roi Partridge and painter and printmaker John Butler. Caroline Mytinger became known in Seattle for her paintings of natives from the Solomon Islands.

== Emergence of Seattle as an arts center ==
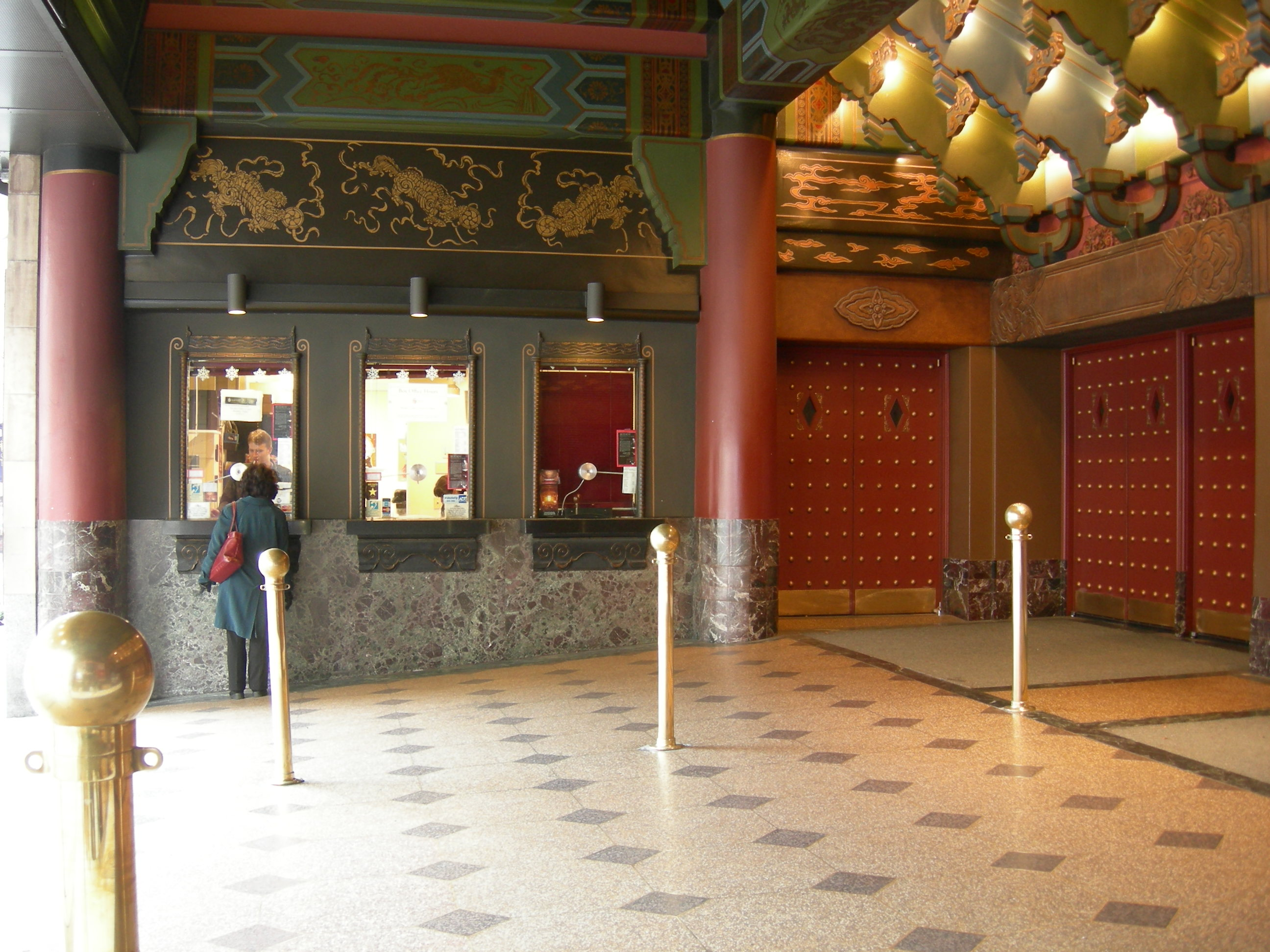
Entrance and box office of Fifth Avenue Theater

Seattle first began to be a visual arts center in the 1920s. Australian painter Ambrose Patterson arrived in 1919. Over the next few decades Mark Tobey, Morris Graves, Kenneth Callahan, Guy Irving Anderson, and Paul Horiuchi would establish themselves as nationally and internationally known artists (see the Northwest School).

While few, if any, figures in the "high" performing arts were based in Seattle in this era, the city was definitely on the national and international arts touring circuit. According to Paul de Barros, in just the single year 1925 Seattle witnessed performances by Russian ballerina Anna Pavlova, pianist Sergei Rachmaninoff, and operatic bass Feodor Chaliapin; Hungarian composer and pianist Ernő Dohnányi; African American lyric tenor Roland Hayes; and Austrian violinist and composer Fritz Kreisler.

Seattle had an active jazz scene dating largely from speakeasies during Prohibition, when Mildred Bailey launched her career singing in Seattle. By mid-century the thriving jazz scene centering in some two dozen clubs along Jackson Street would produce musicians including Ray Charles, Quincy Jones, and Ernestine Anderson. The Brothers Four, one of the collegiate folk groups of the late 1950s and early 1960s, were also from Seattle.

== Century 21 Exposition ==
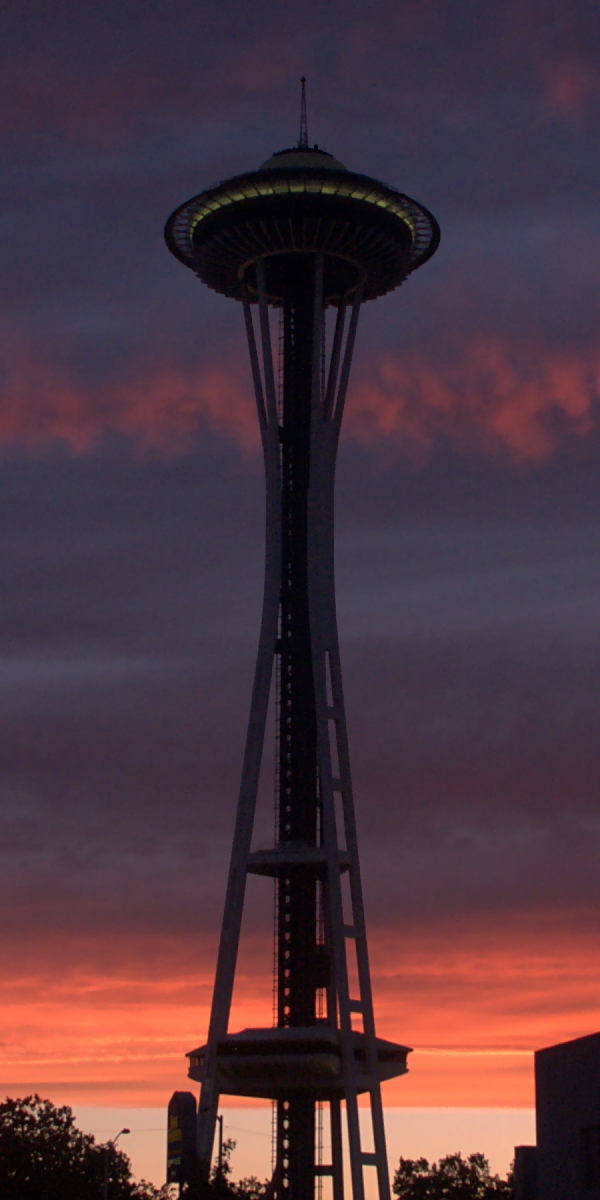
The Space Needle is the most famous architectural legacy of the Century 21 Exposition.

When Seattle decided to try to put itself on the map with the futuristic Century 21 Exposition — the 1962 World's Fair — high culture was on the agenda, as well as popular entertainment along the lines of "Gracie Hansen's Paradise International" and "Les Poupees de Paris," an adult-themed puppet show, both of which aspired more to a Gay Nineties naughtiness than to anything artistic. The Opera House on the grounds of the center was rebuilt for the occasion (and would be rebuilt again 2001–2003 as McCaw Hall); performers at the fair included Igor Stravinsky, Benny Goodman, and Victor Borge; the Seattle Symphony brought in opera singers and staged Aida. The Fine Arts Pavilion (later the Exhibition Hall) managed to bring in works by Titian, Van Dyck, and Monet, as well as more contemporary pieces by Jackson Pollock, Georgia O'Keeffe, and Alexander Calder and by Pacific Northwest artists Tobey, Callahan, and Graves. There was also a significant exhibition of Asian art and Northwest Coast Indian art. The exposition also commissioned a massive abstract mural by Horiuchi, which still forms the backdrop to the stage at Seattle Center's Mural Amphitheater.

Outside of the fair itself, Seattle's bars were filled with the live music that would result just a few years later in the region's first great period as a rock'n'roll mecca.

== After the World's Fair ==
To retire the US$35,000 debt from the Symphony's production of Aida, Seattle arts patrons founded PONCHO. The resulting gala auction was such a success that it also provided $50,000 to help establish the Seattle Opera, and $16,000 to other organizations. PONCHO would go on to raise over $33 million for the arts over the next several decades.

Robert Nesbitt writes in the liner notes to the compilation album Wheedle's Groove that in 1972 the city had "a minimum of twenty live music clubs specializing in funk and soul," and that doesn't count other popular music genres. That collection of live music clubs would shrink drastically beginning in the mid-1970s, first with the rise of disco music and recorded dance music in general, and then with Seattle's slightly rundown center becoming a financial district of new skyscrapers.

Writing in 1972, Nard Jones remarked on the Seattle telephone directory having "three solid columns" of art galleries and dealers, representing "an astonishing variety". Of these he singled out the Richard White Gallery (which in 1973 became Foster/White) and the avant-garde Manolides Gallery (now defunct) and the Woodside Gallery (later Gordon Woodside / John Braseth Gallery) in the Broadway district of Capitol Hill.

== The 1980s ==
It wasn't until the 1980s that Seattle began to be generally recognized as an important performing arts locale. One of the key events in this respect was the Seattle Opera's ambitious and successful staging, under its founding general director Glynn Ross, of Richard Wagner's Der Ring des Nibelungen. Performed in its entirety every summer from 1975 through 1983 back-to-back cycles (first in German, then in English, by 1982, The New York Times reported that Seattle had become a serious rival to Bayreuth. Seattle's Wagner festival has continued to the present day, albeit no longer quite such an ambitious annual event. In 1982 the Seattle Chamber Music Society was formed for the purposes of presenting a summer festival of chamber music. The organization has since expanded to include a winter festival and regularly includes internationally recognized artists such as Cynthia Phelps and James Ehnes on their artist roster.

The popular music scene at the time included such teen-pop bands as the Allies (whose song "Emma Peel" received a good deal of local play, but never broke out nationally) and the Heaters (later "the Heats"). That same era saw the more sophisticated pop of the short-lived Visible Targets and the still-performing Young Fresh Fellows and The Posies; the pop-punk of The Fastbacks; and the outright punk of the Fartz (later Ten Minute Warning).

By the late '80s a group of thirty artists had organized themselves into an organization called Northwest Crafts Alliance. This group's purpose is to promote emerging and established artisans through their art show Best of the Northwest. Today this alliance includes over five hundred local, regional, and nationally acclaimed artisans.

Conceived in 1980, and incorporated in 1981, Red Sky Poetry Theatre (RSPT) influenced the literary and performance scene in Seattle and the entire West Coast for 25 years. RSPT help organize the Bumbershoot literary arts for many years. It would hold competitions to determine what local talent would perform at Bumbershoot. RSPT performed in many of the same venues as the pregrunge bands.

== Grunge Era ==
Seattle burst into the popular consciousness with the grunge rock scene of the early 1990s, when Nirvana, Pearl Jam, Soundgarden, Alice in Chains, Temple of the Dog, and Mudhoney, all reached vast audiences.

Another punk-influenced but non-grunge Seattle band of the period, The Gits, had garnered great local respect; the brutal murder of Gits lead singer Mia Zapata greatly upset the local music scene. Zapata was memorialized in several ways: the creation of a women's self-defense organization, Home Alive, and an album Viva Zapata by Seven Year Bitch, a Seattle band who had counted her as a mentor.

== Arts in Seattle today ==
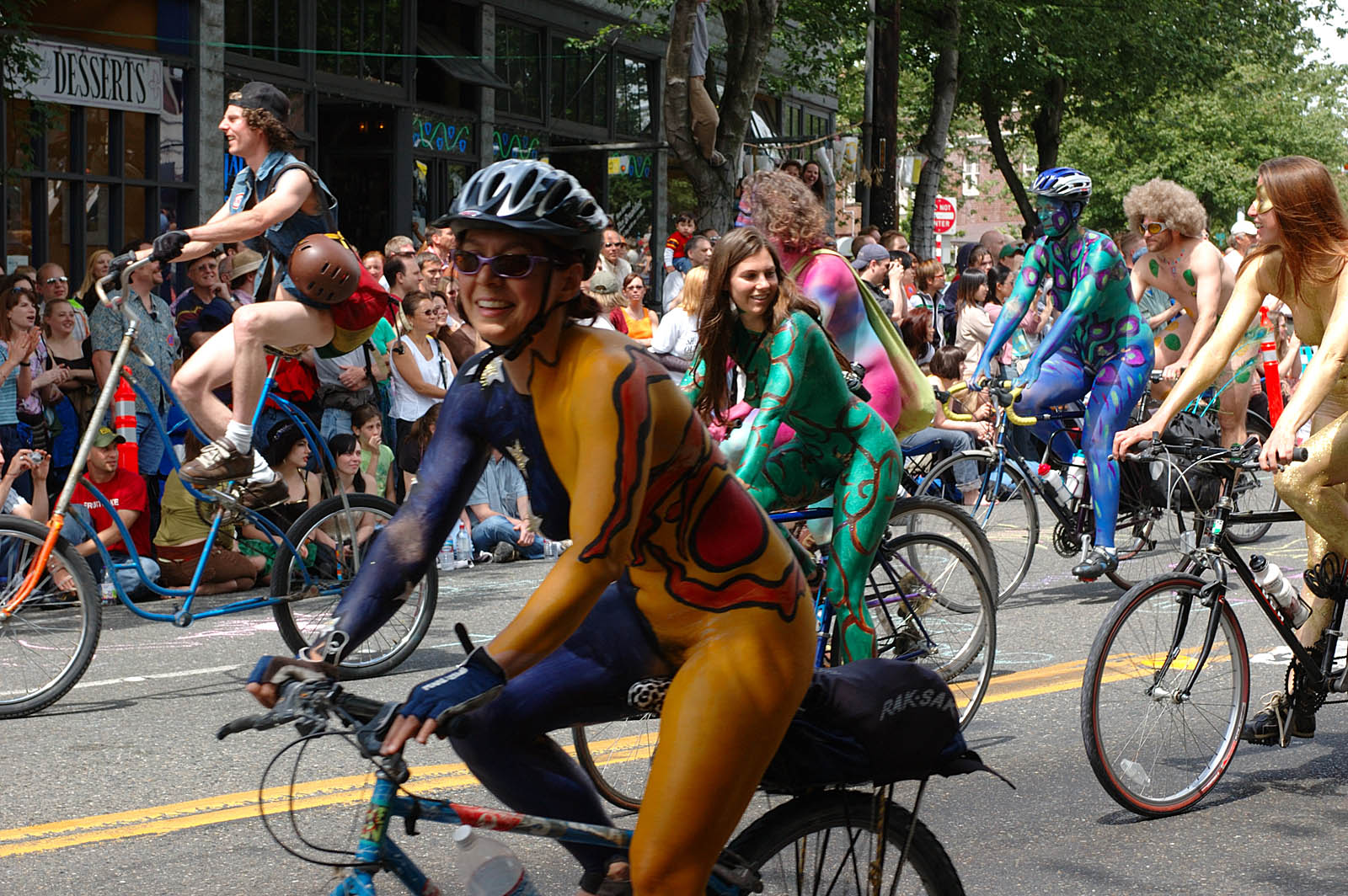
The Solstice Cyclists by tradition usher in the beginning of the free-spirited Summer Solstice Parade & Pageant in the Fremont district of Seattle.

=== Annual cultural events, festivals and fairs ===
Among Seattle's best-known annual cultural events and fairs are Seattle Art Fair, Seattle International Film Festival, Northwest Folklife over the Memorial Day weekend, numerous Seafair events throughout the summer months (ranging from a Bon Odori celebration to hydroplane races), the Bite of Seattle, and Bumbershoot over the Labor Day weekend. All are typically attended by over 100,000 people annually, as are Hempfest and two separate Independence Day celebrations.

Additionally, the city is also home to the Seattle Polish Film Festival (SPFF), an annual film festival showcasing current and past films of Polish cinema. The festival is produced by the Seattle-Gdynia Sister City Association and awards the Seattle Spirit of Polish Cinema awards as well as the Viewers Choice of Best Film.

Several dozen Seattle neighborhoods have one or more annual street fairs, and many have an annual parade or foot race. The largest of the street fairs feature hundreds of craft and food booths and multiple stages with live entertainment, and draw more than 100,000 people over the course of a weekend; the smallest are strictly neighborhood affairs with a few dozen craft and food booths, barely distinguishable from more prominent neighborhoods' weekly farmers' markets.

Other significant events include numerous Native American pow-wows, a Greek Festival hosted by St. Demetrios Greek Orthodox Church in Montlake, and numerous ethnic festivals associated with Festal at Seattle Center.

As in most large cities, there are numerous other annual events of more limited interest, ranging from book fairs and specialized film festivals to a two-day, 8,000-rider Seattle-to-Portland bicycle ride.

=== Performing arts ===
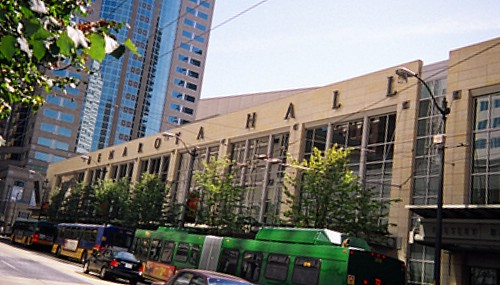
Benaroya Hall

Seattle is a significant center for the performing arts. The century-old Seattle Symphony Orchestra is among the world's most recorded orchestras and performs primarily at Benaroya Hall. The Seattle Opera and Pacific Northwest Ballet, which perform at McCaw Hall (which opened 2003 on the site of the former Seattle Opera House at Seattle Center), are comparably distinguished, with the Opera being particularly known for its performances of the works of Richard Wagner and the PNB School (founded in 1974) ranking as one of the top three ballet training institutions in the United States. The Seattle Youth Symphony is the largest symphonic youth organization in the United States, and among the most distinguished. The Seattle Flute Society, founded in 1979, is one of the oldest flute associations in the United States. Seattle mourned the loss of one of its best known classical musicians, the Tuba man who was heard by hundreds of thousands in front of sports and arts venues for decades until his death in 2008.

The historic 5th Avenue Theatre, built in 1926, continues to stage Broadway quality musical performances featuring both local talent and international stars. The theater's "Chinese Timber Architecture" is based upon the Forbidden City's Imperial and Summer palaces. In addition, Seattle has about twenty live theater venues, a slim majority of them being associated with fringe theater. It has a strong local scene for poetry slams and other performance poetry, and several venues that routinely present public lectures or readings. The largest of these is Seattle's 900-seat, Roman Revival Town Hall on First Hill.

==== Popular music today ====
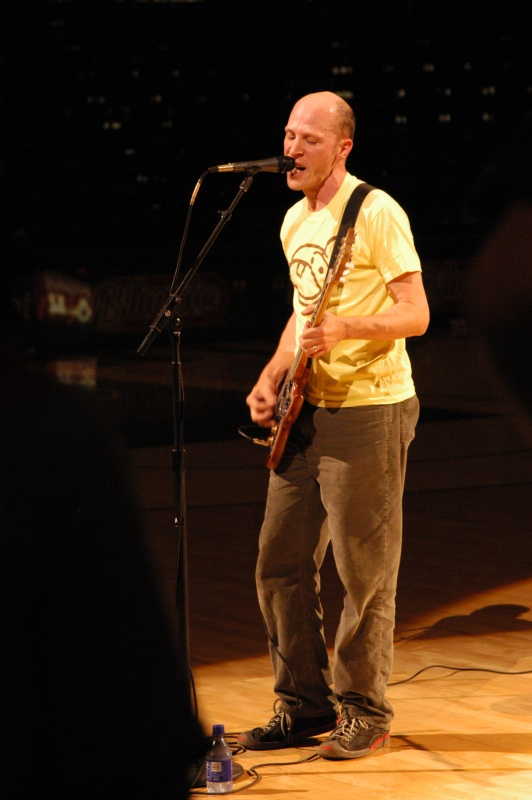
Chris Ballew of The Presidents of the United States of America, 2005

In popular music, Seattle is often thought of as the home of grunge rock, but it is also home to such varied musicians as avant-garde jazz musicians Bill Frisell and Wayne Horvitz, hot Jazz band leader Glenn Crytzer, rapper Sir Mix-a-Lot, smooth jazz saxophonist Kenny G, and such poppier rock bands as Goodness and The Presidents of the United States of America. Such musicians as Jimi Hendrix, Duff McKagan, Nikki Sixx, and Quincy Jones spent their formative years in Seattle. Ann and Nancy Wilson of the band Heart, often attributed to Seattle, were actually from the neighboring suburb of Bellevue, as was progressive metal band Queensrÿche.

Seattle hosts a diverse and influential alternative music scene. The Seattle-based record label Sub Pop was the first to sign Nirvana, and also signed such non-grunge bands as The Postal Service and The Shins. Other Seattle-area bands of note include Pearl Jam, Sunn O))), Acceptance, Aiden, Alien Crime Syndicate, Antlers, Ayron Jones and The Way, The Beautiful Mothers, the Blakes, The Blood Brothers, Blue Scholars, The Catheters, Charlie Drown, Common Heroes, Dangermart, Daphne Loves Derby (Kent), Death Cab for Cutie (Bellingham), Daylight Basement, The Divorce, Dog Bone Sanctuary, Dolour, Drop Six, Drown Mary, Harvey Danger, Fleet Foxes, Foo Fighters, Gatsby's American Dream, Maktub, Metal Church, Minus the Bear, Macklemore & Ryan Lewis, Modest Mouse (Issaquah), Mudhoney, The Murder City Devils, MxPx (Bremerton), The Myriad, Pedro the Lion, Point One, Ruby Doe, Schoolyard Heroes, Screaming Trees (originally from Ellensburg), Second Coming, Sky Cries Mary, Sleater-Kinney (Olympia), Slicing Grandpa, Smoosh, Soundgarden, Sunny Day Real Estate, Super Deluxe, Supersuckers, Sweet 75, Trial, Turn to Fall, United State of Electronica, Utterance, Vendetta Red, Vexed, Vindaloo, Visqueen, Zeke and The Zero Points.

The Experience Music Project (EMP) in Seattle Center is one of the few major institutions anywhere specifically devoted to popular music. Although EMP has scaled back its live music programming from the level of its first few years, every April since 2002 it has hosted the three-day Pop Conference, which brings together a few hundred people for a unique conference that presents the perspectives of academics, writers, artists, and fans.

=== Visual arts ===
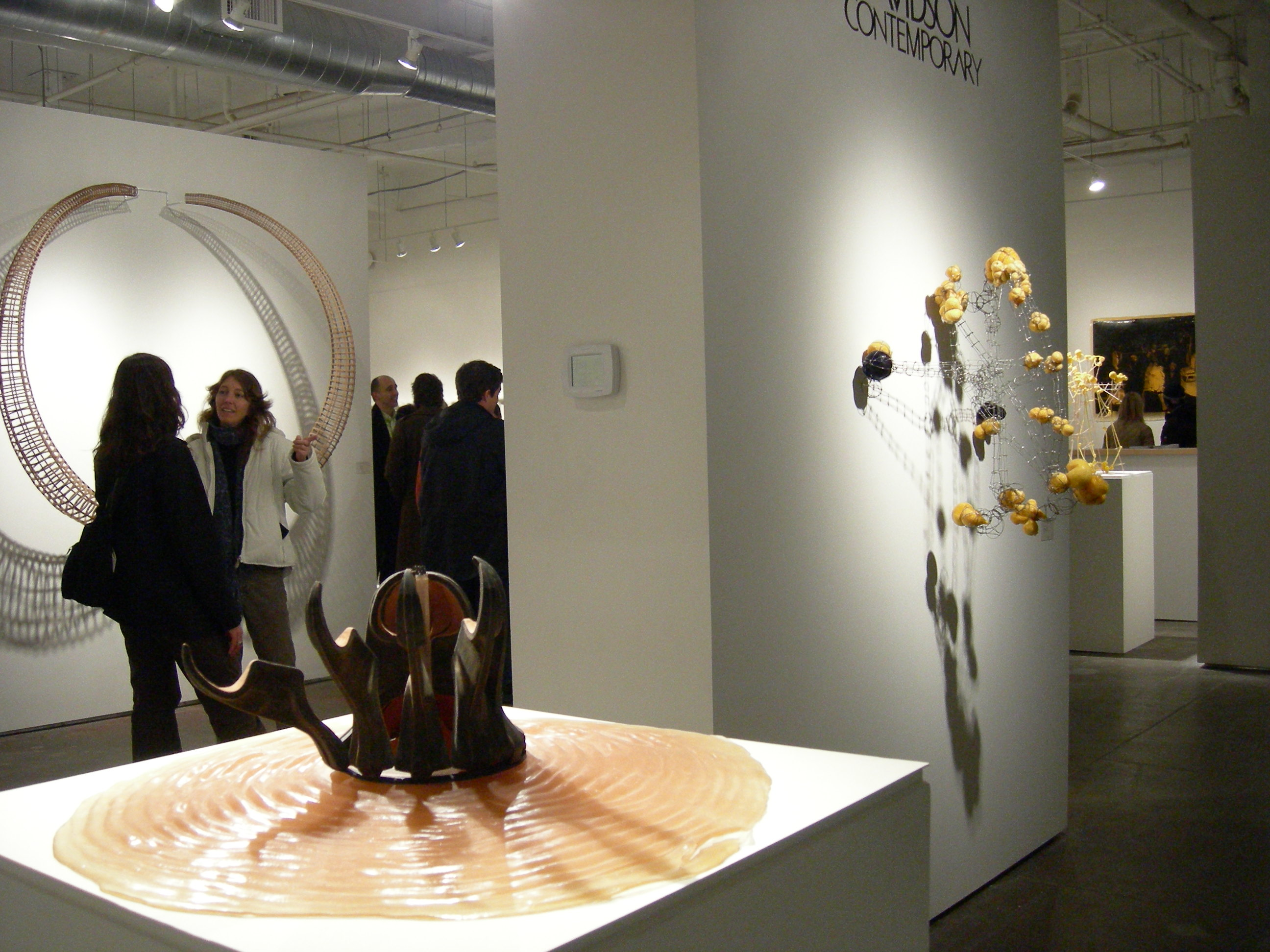
Gallery show opening, Davidson Contemporary, December 2006

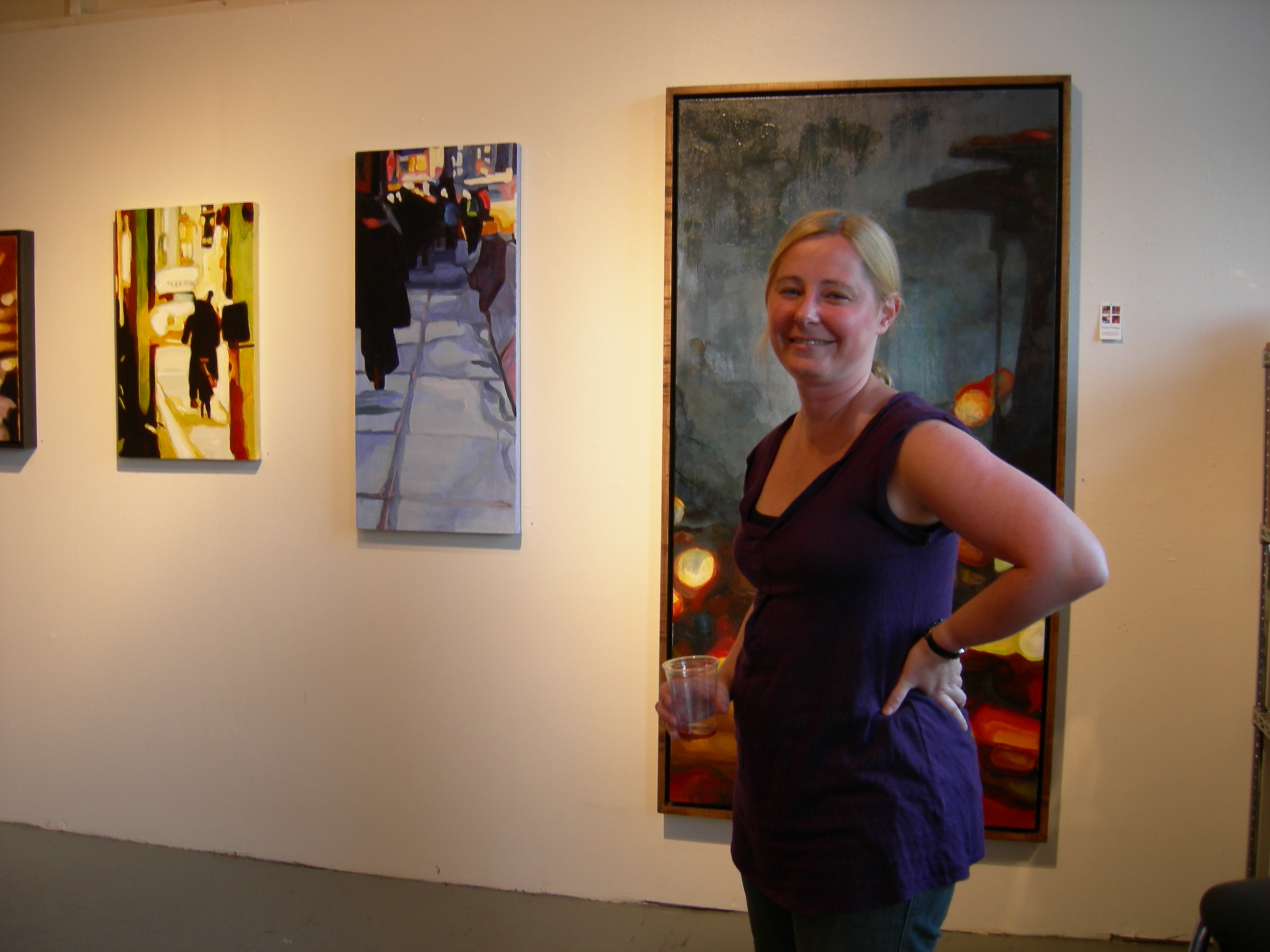
Artist Kate Protage in her Pioneer Square studio, September 2006

Being so much younger than the cities of Europe and the Eastern United States, Seattle has a lower profile in terms of art museums than it does in the performing arts. It is nonetheless home to four major art museums and galleries: the Frye Art Museum, the Henry Art Gallery, the Seattle Art Museum, and the Seattle Asian Art Museum. Several Seattle museums and cultural institutions that are not specifically art museums also have excellent art collections, most notably the Burke Museum of Natural History and Culture, which has an excellent collection of Native American artwork.

Seattle has well over 100 non-profit art spaces and numerous commercial art galleries, and likely over a thousand artists' studios Many of the galleries and studios are concentrated in one neighborhood, Pioneer Square. See Museums and galleries of Seattle.

In recent decades, Washington State, King County, and Seattle have all allocated a certain percentage of all capital budgets to the arts. Several neighborhoods have also raised funds for art installations, usually sculptures. Among the results are massive murals by Fay Jones, Gene Gentry McMahon, and Roger Shimomura in the Westlake Station of the Metro bus tunnel; pieces by Ross Palmer Beecher in such unlikely locations as the Safeco Field hallways or a men's room at Seattle-Tacoma International Airport A magnificent glass tile mosaic mural by Paul Horiuchi forms a backdrop to the stage of the Mural Amphitheater at Seattle Center.

Seattle was home of Jacob Lawrence from 1970 until his death in 2000. He is well represented in local corporate collections; several of his pieces are prominently displayed at the Paul G. Allen Center for Computer Science & Engineering at the University of Washington, as is a piece by one of his colleagues from the U.W. art faculty, Alden Mason, and works by other artists associated with the Pacific Northwest.

Probably the most visible public sculpture in Seattle is Jonathan Borofsky's 48-foot kinetic sculpture "Hammering Man", outside the Seattle Art Museum; probably the most unusual and popular are several pieces in the Fremont neighborhood, including the Fremont Troll, a bronze statue of Lenin formerly in Slovakia, and Richard Beyer's "Waiting for the Interurban."

=== Alternative, Urban and Pop Surrealism (Low Brow) art scene ===
In the last several years, Seattle has become a central hub for the burgeoning Alternative, Urban Art and Low Brow/New Brow art scenes. Frequently situated around several of the city's "art walks," which are often put together by young, experimental artists, galleries and collectives like the Greenwood Collective, Roq La Rue, Push/Pull, The Factory and the now closed studios at 619 Western in the historic Pioneer Square. Many of the artists in this scene employ "alternative" venues, including cafés, bars like the locally famous Pioneer Square Saloon, and even exterior building walls, newspaper boxes or re-purposed phone booths, as a way of exposing viewers to their artwork.

Moreover, these artists are better known for employing unconventional means of communication, overturning the traditional rules of the art market. These tactics often include happenings, performance art, unsanctioned sculpture, wheatpasting, murals, and aerosol—-which at times puts members of the scene at odds with both established (and often safer) Seattle artists and city officials. This is also what distinguishes them from much of the art that can be found in the city's traditional art venues. However, it is arguably this willingness to find alternative methods of expression that has given the movement its vibrancy and an increasing significance in the art world as a whole.

=== Seattle's Alternative Comic Scene ===
In 1989, Fantagraphics, an American publisher of alternative comics relocated to Seattle Washington from Los Angeles California. This marked an important year in the development of the Seattle--and west coast DIY and underground comix scene. Initially moving to the Maple Leaf neighborhood, the comic publisher eventually moved to the Georgetown neighborhood--where they still remain to this day. Over the years notable figures in this niche visual art realm have called Seattle home. Important Seattle based comics artists include: Roberta Gregory, David Lasky, Lynda Barry, Charles Burns, Peter Bagge, Mark Campos, Ellen Forney, Jim Woodring, Max Clofelter, and Marc Palm.

Today, Seattle continues to have a bustling comics scene which is the home of one of the most important alternative comic festivals in the country. Short Run Comix Festival is hosted annually at the beginning of November and draws visitors from across the region and boats an impressive roster of internationally and nationally renown illustrators.

== Poetry ==
=== Seattle's Poet Populist ===
Seattle is unique in that since 1999 it has been electing a Poet Populist. While similar to Poet Laureate programs, for which dignitaries or government officials select a poet, Seattle conducts a citywide popular vote to determine the Poet Populist. In Seattle, local poets are nominated by Seattle literary organizations for election to the post of Seattle Poet Populist.

After the formal nomination process voting opens to Seattle residents who generally have a few months to vote for their Poet Populist choice. Thousands of citizens cast their vote for Poet Populist every year. Write-In candidates are also permitted. In the 2007-2008 election George Quibuyen (also known as Geologic) of the Blue Scholars received 96 write-in votes which was the largest total for any write-in candidate in the decade long history of the citywide competition until Ananda Osel earned 391 write-in votes, breaking the record and placing 2nd in the 2008-2009 election.

In the past the four candidates with the highest votes totals have hosted readings at Seattle's Richard Hugo House. Poet Populists are nominated in September and are inaugurated in January. During the Poet Populist's term he/she has the responsibility of writing one commissioned poem, and promoting the art of poetry through various performances and teaching opportunities.

Past Poet Populist Winners include Barnard Harris Jr. who won the title in 1999–2000, Bart Baxter (2001–2002), Tara Hardy (2002–2003), Pesha Joyce Gertler (2005–2006), Jourdan Imani Keith (2006–2007), Cody Walker (2007–2008) and Mike Hickey (2008–2009).

The program was founded by City Council President Nick Licata, and is supported by resolution of the Seattle City Council. The Seattle Poet Populist is support by the Seattle Weekly, The Seattle Public Library, and the city of Seattle.

=== Spoken Word Poetry ===
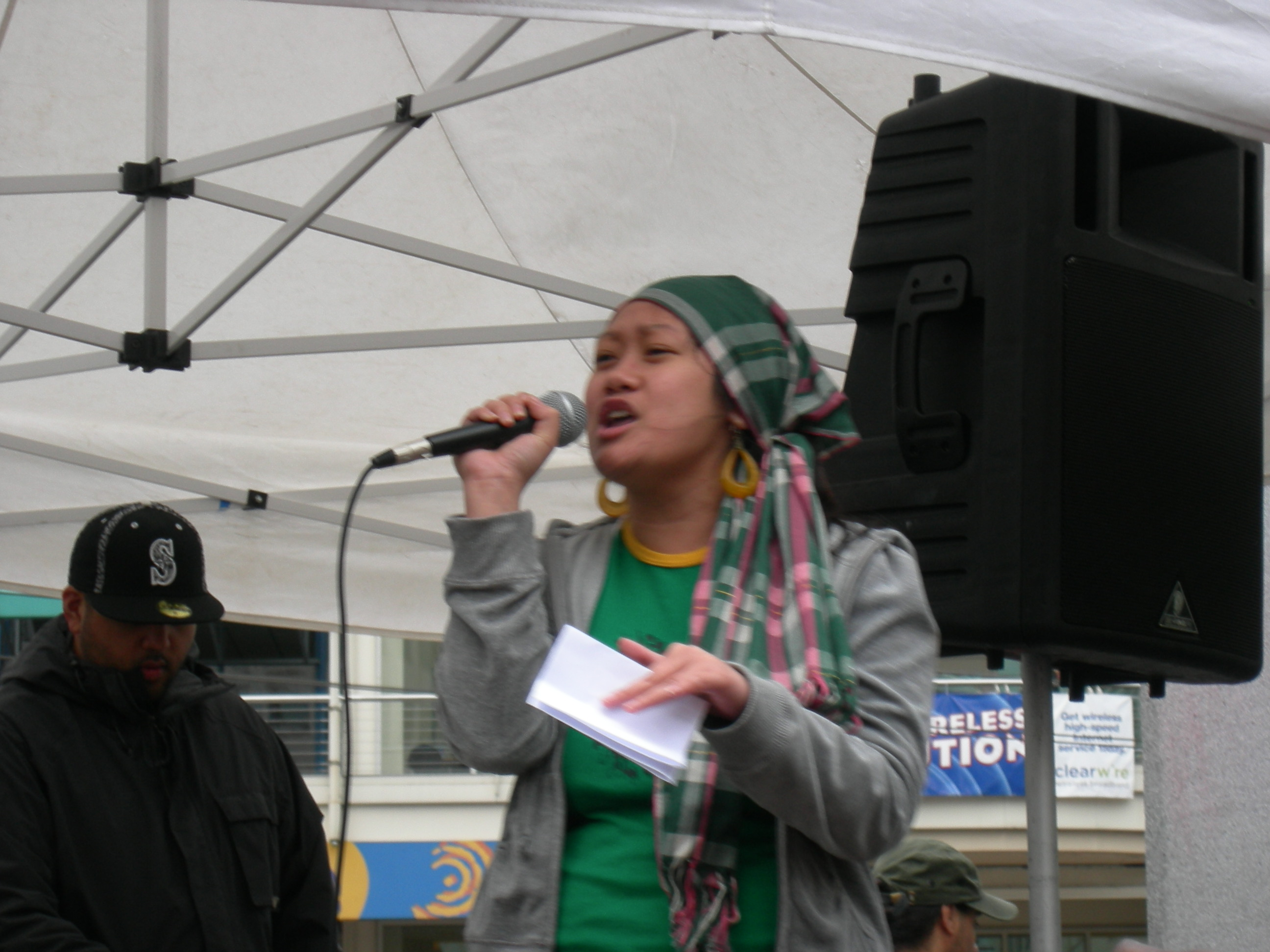
Performance poet Rogue Pinay, 2007

Seattle has been either the birthplace or longtime home to a number of highly respected poets. Probably the earliest was physician Henry A. Smith, who in 1887 wrote and published the English-language text known as "Chief Seattle's Reply". More recent Seattle poets of note have included Theodore Roethke, Richard Hugo, Denise Levertov, Carolyn Kizer, David Wagoner, Barry Lopez, and Steven "Jesse" Bernstein, the last a pioneer of performance poetry. Berstein read frequently at Red Sky Poetry Theatre which ran a performance series for 25 years.

== Fiction ==
In addition to poetry, there have been several notable novels set in Seattle. Among them is Kirby Olson's novel Temping (Seattle: Black Heron Press, 2006) that features a young man working as a temporary secretary who is looking for a little more from life.

The long-running television medical drama series Grey's Anatomy is set in Seattle, at the fictional Seattle Grace-Mercy West Hospital (later, Grey-Sloan Memorial Hospital), though it is actually filmed primarily in Los Angeles.

== Other museums, aquariums, zoos, and cultural centers ==
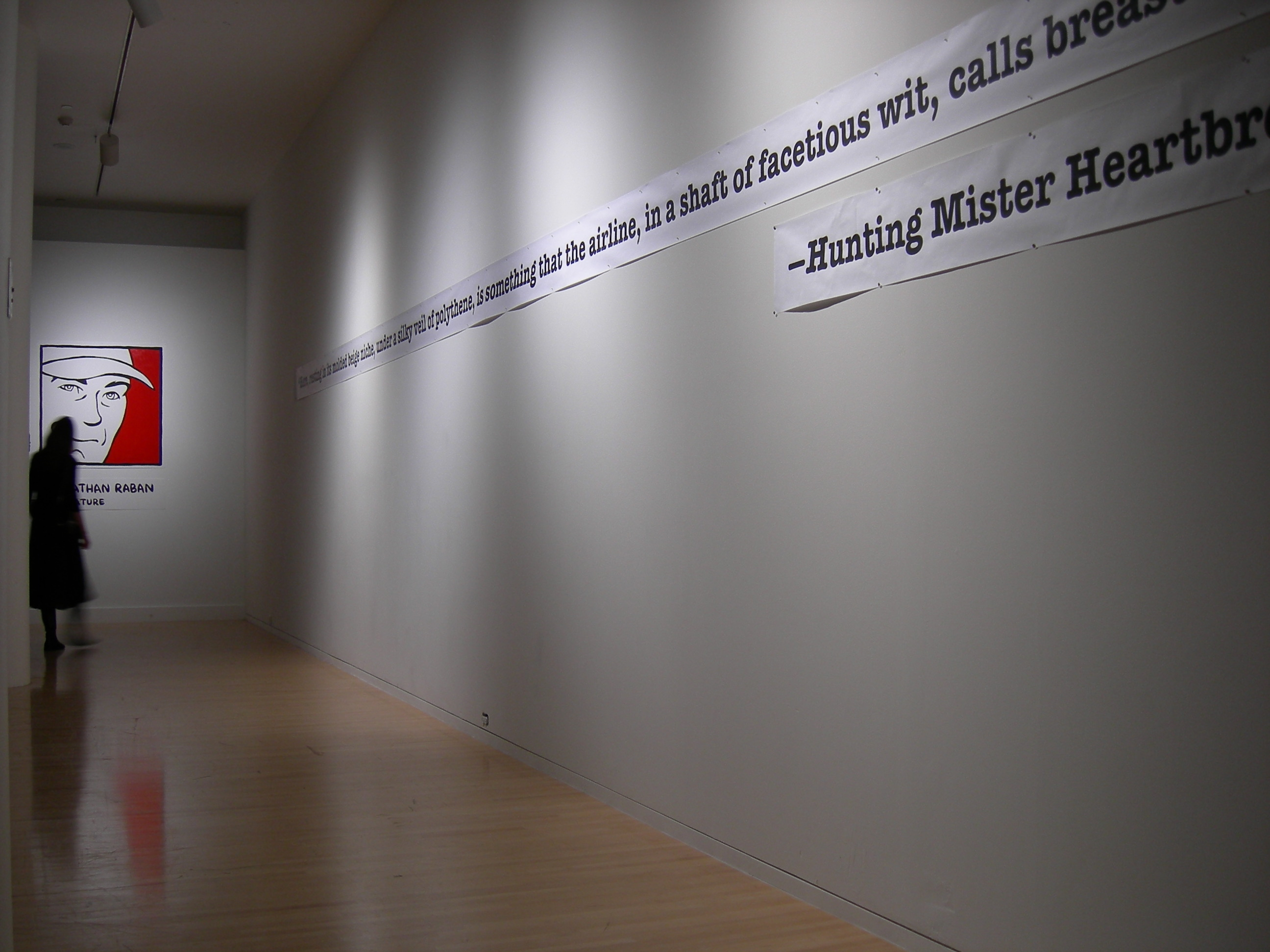
A 2006 exhibit at the Henry honoring Stranger Genius Award winners pays tribute to Seattle-based writer Jonathan Raban.

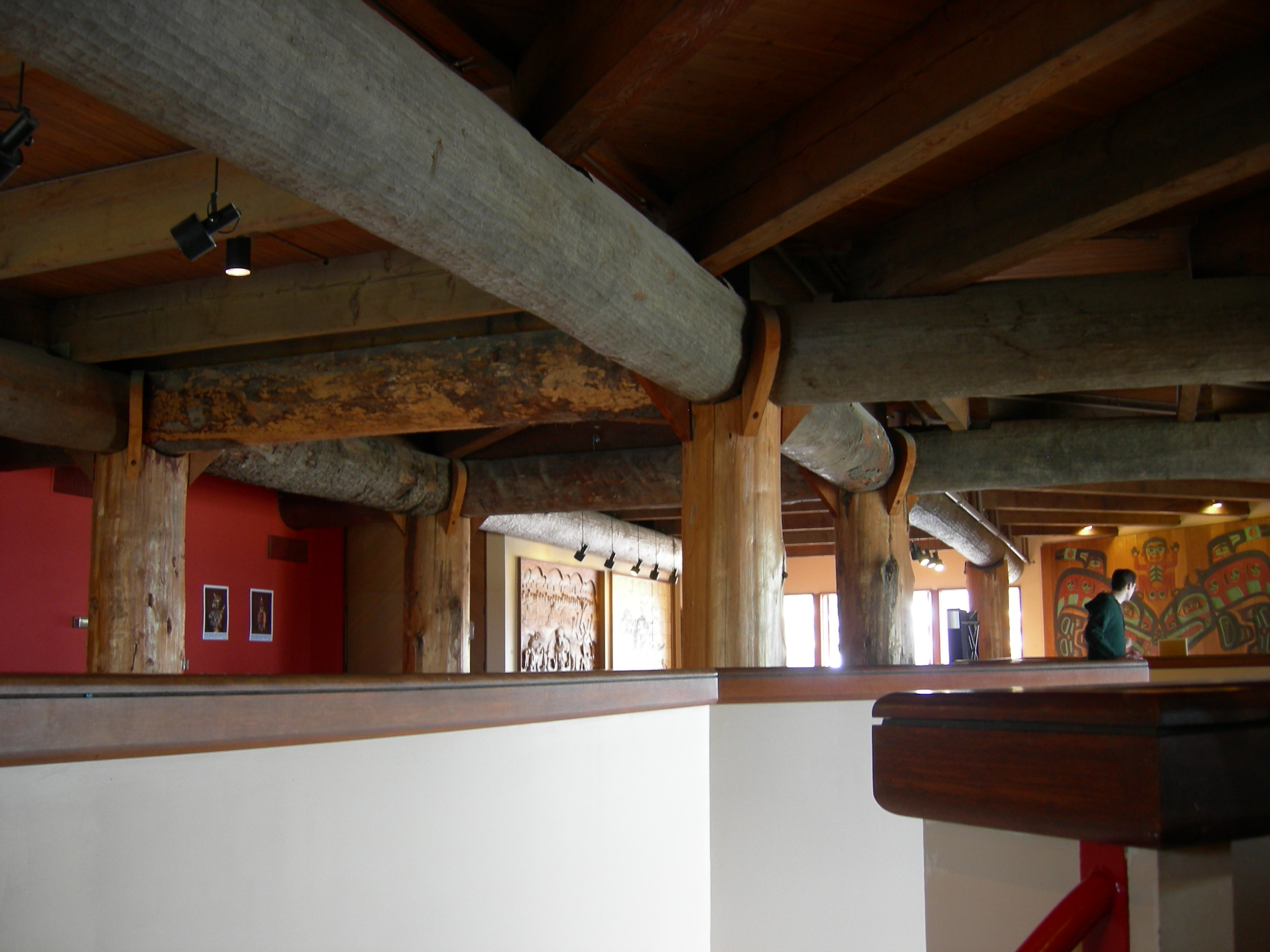
Daybreak Star Cultural Center

There are a number of other museums in Seattle. The Burke Museum of Natural History and Culture, on the campus of the University of Washington, has a large collection of botanical, zoological, and geologic specimens in addition to its anthropology collection, which concentrates on Native Americans of the Pacific Northwest but covers the rest of the Americas, Asia, and the Pacific Islands as well. Residents and visitors interested in history, industry, and transportation are served by the Center for Wooden Boats, a maritime heritage museum on Lake Union; the Museum of Flight, which incorporates Boeing's original manufacturing plant; and the Museum of History and Industry, which recently celebrated its 50th anniversary. Popular with tourists are the Seattle duck tour and the Underground Tour which tours the remains of Seattle that existed before the great fire of 1889. The Nordic Heritage Museum in Ballard honors Seattle's Scandinavian immigrants, and the Seattle Metropolitan Police Museum in Pioneer Square honors its police force. And on the campus of Seattle Center are located the Pacific Science Center and Paul Allen's Experience Music Project and Science Fiction Museum and Hall of Fame.

The Seattle Aquarium is located on the Elliott Bay waterfront, and the Woodland Park Zoo is on Phinney Ridge in north Seattle.

A fire erupted in January 2024 in a Seattle gallery, works by Picasso, M.C Escher, Goya, Rembrandt and others were said to have been damaged according to CNN.

United Indians of All Tribes operates the Daybreak Star Cultural Center in Discovery Park.
