= Marilyn Stablein =

American poet (born 1946)

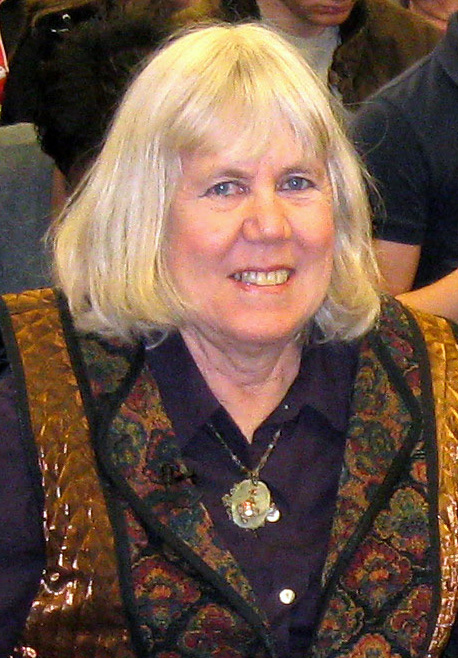
- Marilyn Stablein in 2011
- Born: August 22, 1946 (age 80)
- Occupations: Poet, essayist, fiction writer, mixed media artist

Marilyn Stablein (born August 22, 1946) is an American poet, essayist, fiction writer and mixed media artist whose sculptural artist's books, altered books and performance art concern visual narrative, travelogue and memoir.

== Life ==
Born in Los Angeles, California Stablein attended schools in Palo Alto, California and graduated from Palo Alto High School. She began studies at the University of California, Berkeley and completed a bachelor's degree from the University of Washington in 1981. She received a master's degree from the University of Houston in 1984. She lives and works in Portland, Oregon.

=== Influences ===
As a child Stablein became interested in Asian culture from visits to Chinatown, San Francisco and the Asian Art Museum. After reading about the India travels of Beat Generation writers Gary Snyder and Allen Ginsberg she traveled to India as a teenager and studied Tibetan culture. She wrote about the Boudhanath Tibetan Losar celebration, published an illustrated article on Tibetan pilgrimage. and published books about the six-years she lived in the Himalayas from 1966-1972.

== Work ==
=== Poetry ===
A reviewer in the Notre Dame Review wrote Splitting Hard Ground "combines elements of travelog, cultural studies and spiritual journey, and was praised as her other books have been, for its poetic prose, which Stablein has now distilled into actual poems. Her central themes are all here on display: politics and prophecy, how the land and character interact, a deep social concern for the woes of others.". Another reviewer noted how "Dreams and reality, enlightenment and practicality weave together creating an American women's portrait of life deep in the heart of regions unknown to most of us. Blending the conventional with the bizarre, the every-day with the exotic, the mundane with the extraordinary." Martin Abramson, Splitting Hard Ground, a review in Book/Mark A Quarterly Small Press Review, Winter/Spring 2012. Milepost 27; Poems by artist and poet Marilyn Stablein take the reader on an unexpected journey. They’re set first in the Pacific Northwest (with a brief foray into Kashmir), then in New Mexican hot springs; and then—at the heart of the book—in arid New Mexico—the “Milepost 27” of the title. Early poems narrate or describe the concrete or natural: sea lions piling-on, wood ticks “vacuuming under the skin,” poet imagining porcupine love; saving soap ends. The playful quality of those initial poems retreats, though, in the New Mexico section, where Stablein describes the Rio Grande grinding “charnel ground,” being stranded on a desiccated Route 66, and pervading images of fire and ash. That section’s stunning “How to Build a Descanso” takes the reader’s breath away and throws a different-shaded light onto this memorable collection.” -- Panelist Pick, Southwest Book of the Year 2019

=== Fiction ===
Stories set in India and Nepal were published in The North American Review and The Mississippi Review. About Stablein's short story collection, The Census Taker: Tales of a Traveler in India and Nepal, a reviewer wrote, "Traveling on a shoestring (or a sandal strap in this case) in India and Nepal takes fortitude and a great deal of open-mindedness. Stablein has both. She wandered fearlessly through the street life of India and Nepal." A reviewer commented on the style of the short prose poems anthologized in Nixon Under the Bodhi Tree; "Marilyn Stablein's pieces, are like sneak-attack satoris, extremely short prose poems that, in their brevity, capture the suchness of a moment. They are carefully honed, almost textbook examples of the short story form...". Another reviewer mentioned the short style, "Among these sometimes pat and slight vignettes, the most substantial is the fable-like title story, which renders the country of Bhutan as an imaginary realm that might have emerged from the pen of Donald Barthelme."

=== Nonfiction ===
Stablein's memoir, Sleeping in Caves: A Sixties Himalayan Memoir (2003) , is included in what is described as "a fantastical, eclectic reading list" in The New York Times. Her essays were published in The Sun Magazine, The Buddhist Review and The Kyoto Journal. Two of Stablein's essays anthologized in Out of the Catskills and Just Beyond, and The Truth About the Territory: Contemporary Nonfiction from the Northwest were collected in Climate of Extremes: Landscape and Imagination. Her book reviews appeared in The Seattle Times and The San Francisco Chronicle.

=== Art ===
In a series of art works exhibited in New York, Stablein began to incorporate autobiographical collage elements into her work. When she began making sculptural artist's books and altered books in 2006 she continued to use collaged ephemera. A reviewer noted one visual narrative or journal, Collage Journal: New York to New Mexico, featured "tickets, programs, invitations and other ephemera that form a memoir of a period in her life or a particular trip." In the issue of Bound and Lettered magazine which featured one of Stablein's altered books on the cover, a reviewer of the art monograph Bind, Alter, Fold: Artist Books notes the three dimensional quality of Stablein's accordion-style binding, "permits the viewer to see the billboard-like array of pages, with their colorful collage of images and text, in a way similar to a traveler observing advertising along the highway". Stablein used a variety of binding styles to create artist books illustrated with excerpts from her Himalayan notebooks and literary journals. One curator notes Stablein is a "book and assemblage artist whose work explores and celebrates cultural artifacts and traditions."

Her book sculptures and visual journals are featured in magazines and on magazine covers. Her artist books have been exhibited at the University of California San Diego Geisel Library, Delaware Center for Contemporary Art, the Rhode Island School of Design, and featured in books.

=== Performance art ===
In the 1980s Stablein began to script her written work into multimedia performance art events. In a 1987 work, AutoText: Poems, Bullhorns, Streets she pioneered the use of a bullhorn to recite poetry with another poet from the back of a moving vehicle. AutoText also performed in 1987 at An Alternative To Loud Boats. Stablein performed Intrusions in Ice at the 1990 Bumbershoot Literary Arts Fair. In a 1998 work, The Gypsy Procession, Stablein collaborated with fluxus artist Dick Higgins. "Dick appeared as the King of Ties. He had a wonderful crown with ties hanging from it and a coat made of ties," composer Pauline Oliveros wrote about the parade. Artworks from The Gypsy Procession were exhibited in a show curated by the artist Judy Chicago.

== Bibliography ==
=== Art ===
- Bind, Alter, Fold: Artist Books 2015 ISBN 978-0-9608920-4-4
- Himalayan Notebook collages, 2021 Red Fox Press, Ireland.
- Elephant Chronicles collages, 2022 Red Fox Press, Ireland.

=== Fiction ===
- The Census Taker: Tales of a Traveler in India and Nepal, 1985, ISBN 978-0-8808900-9-0
- Night Travels to Tibet, 2001, OCLC 665864049
- The Monkey Thief: Himalayan Tales, 2003, OCLC 57138388
- More Night Travels to Tibet, 2010, OCLC 828682282
- Vermin: A Traveler's Bestiary, 2018.

=== Nonfiction ===
- Houseboat on the Ganges & A Room in Kathmandu, Letters from India and Nepal, 1966-1972, 2019, ISBN 978-1-63405-972-5
- Sleeping in Caves: A Sixties Himalayan Memoir, 2003, ISBN 978-0-9726357-0-7
- Climate of Extremes: Landscape and Imagination, 1995, ISBN 978-0-9307733-8-0

=== Poetry ===
- Milepost 27:Poems, 2019, ISBN 978-1-936364-31-2 Milepost 27
- Splitting Hard Ground: Poems, 2010, ISBN 978-1-8888095-6-5

=== Anthologies ===
- The Truth About the Territory: Contemporary Nonfiction from the Northwest, 1988, ISBN 978-0937669266
- Nixon Under the Bodhi Tree, 2004 ISBN 978-0-8617135-4-7
- Make it True: Poetry from Cascadia, 2015, ISBN 978-1-926655-81-9
- Stealing Light: A Raven Chronicles Anthology 1991-1996, 2018,
