= Steven Bernstein =

Steven Bernstein may refer to:

- Steven Bernstein (cinematographer) (active from 1986), American cinematographer
- Steven Bernstein (musician) (born 1961), American trumpeter
- Steven "Jesse" Bernstein (1950–1991), American poet
