= Linda Lister =

American soprano and teacher of singing (born 1969)

Linda Lister (born June 30, 1969) is an American soprano and teacher of singing.

== Background ==
Linda Lister's solo career includes performances with the Prague Radio Symphony Orchestra (SOČR), the Washington Symphony Orchestra, the Buffalo Philharmonic, Piedmont Opera Theatre, Opera Theatre of Rochester, Rochester Oratorio Society, Long Leaf Opera, Greensboro Oratorio Society, Cambridge Opera, Cambridge Gilbert and Sullivan Society, and Maine State Music Theatre. Her favorite roles include Monica in The Medium, Musetta in La Bohème, Maria in West Side Story, Maggie in A Chorus Line, and the title role in Massenet's Cendrillon.

A featured soloist on the Albany Records CDs The American Soloist and Midnight Tolls, she sang the world premiere of “Mountain Night Recessional” at the Biltmore House. Lister has won awards from the National Association for Teachers of Singing (NATS), the Metropolitan Opera Council Auditions, and Greater Miami Opera in addition to winning the 1998 Dissertation Prize from the National Opera Association.

She is currently on faculty at the University of Nevada Las Vegas, and was formerly on the faculty at the University of Evansville. A Phi Beta Kappa graduate of Vassar College, she received the Master of Music degree in vocal performance from the Eastman School of Music and the Doctor of Musical Arts degree in vocal performance from the University of North Carolina at Greensboro. Before coming to the University of Evansville, she served on the voice faculties of Shorter College (Shorter University) where she created the course Yoga for Singers, Elon University, Greensboro College, the SUNY Fredonia, the Music Academy of North Carolina, the Hochstein School of Music and Dance, and the School of Choral Studies at the New York State Summer School of the Arts (NYSSA).

Lister is also a composer, and her chamber opera about the Brontë sisters (How Clear She Shines!) had its world premiere in 2002 and the Ladies Musical Club of Seattle commissioned a piano trio version of the opera for its west coast revival in 2006.

== Discography ==
- The American Soloist, Dvorak Symphony Orchestra (Albany Records, 2004)
- Midnight Tolls, Dvorak Symphony Orchestra (Albany, 2006)]
