= Margareta Waterman =

American poet and publisher (1932–2026)

- Born: December 8, 1932; Boston, Massachusetts, U.S.
- Died: May 9, 2026 (aged 93); Winston, Oregon, U.S.
- Citizenship: United States
- Occupations: Poet, publisher
- Writing career
- Genre: Poetry

Margareta L. Waterman (December 8, 1932 – May 9, 2026), intentionally stylised lowercase as margareta waterman, was an American poet and publisher. She founded the small press nine muses books in Seattle, Washington, in 1987, and published upwards of 70 books and chapbooks by poets, improvisational musicians, and other writers from the Pacific Northwest in her lifetime. nine muses books is listed in The Directory of Poetry Publishers, 30th edition. More than two dozen books of waterman's poems and short stories were published. Her work references mythology and the female experience. waterman did not begin publicly performing her work or publishing until she was in her 50s.

In Seattle, waterman was affiliated with the Seattle Muse Community and served on the board of the Red Sky Poetry Theatre from 1989 to 1994. She founded manifest arts, a series of poetry and performance art videos originally broadcast on TCI. manifest arts documented work by Charlie Burks, Louise Dovell, Martina Goodin, Bill Shively, Carletta Wilson, Marion Kimes, Michael Hureaux, Thomas R Prince, and David Lloyd Whited from 1989 to 1990.

== Background ==
waterman was born in Boston, Massachusetts, and was raised in New York City. Her mother was a French (and later music) teacher, and her father was a sports journalist. Both parents were involved in labor organizing. waterman attended New York public schools before attending Connecticut College, Hunter College, and Williams College. waterman was married to Kenneth Moore from 1951 to 1957, Lewis Murdock from 1957 to 1982, and had three children, Cynthia, Pamela, and Roderick. She brought her family west in 1969 to join a commune in Southern Oregon. In 1986, she moved to Seattle and began to collaborate with musicians, dancers, painters, and sculptors. She did an extensive reading tour of the United States and Canada from 1994 to 1998. She traveled extensively and lived in Greece, India, Australia, Africa, China, Tibet, and various countries in South America.

waterman died in Winston, Oregon, on May 9, 2026, at the age of 93.

== Selected works ==
- the seed of osiris, nine muses books, 1987
- eleusinian theatre, nine muses books, 1988
- red sky sketches, nine muses books, 1988
- moon riding backwards, nine muses books, 1989
- lady orpheus, nine muses books, 1990
- cracked crystal, nine muses books, 1991
- egyptian night, nine muses books, 1991
- walkin' occam's razor, nine muses books, 1991
- lady orpheus, nine muses books, 1993
- astarte calling clytemnestra, nine muses books, 1994
- some south american colors, nine muses books, 1995
- five songs from the primordial alphabet, nine muses books, 1996
- cloud coop songs, 26 BOOKS, 1997
- the mother of the world, nine muses books, 1999
- loose ends, nine muses books, 2000
- the lion throne, nine muses books, 2002
- pending visions, nine muses books, 2003
- now and other times, nine muses books, 2003
- iteration, nine muses books, 2005
- the sexuality of ageing, nine muses books, 2009
- achilles and helen, nine muses books, 2013
- the voice of lysergic acid, nine muses books, 2013
