= PONCHO =

Non-profit corporation in Seattle, Washington, USA

The Patrons of Northwest Civic, Cultural and Charitable Organizations (PONCHO) is a non-profit corporation in Seattle, Washington, United States, whose annual fund-raising auction has long played a significant role in funding the arts in Seattle. However, over the years, the gala auction slowly ceased to be profitable and will not occur after 2008, being replaced by smaller art and wine auctions. Janet True, president of the PONCHO board, has indicated that the gala auction will probably be replaced by something parallel to New York City's Tony Awards.

The group was founded in 1963 to hold an auction to retire the US$35,000 debt accumulated by the Seattle Symphony's critically successful performance of Verdi's Aida at the 1962 Seattle World's Fair, the Century 21 Exposition. They exceeded their goal, raising enough additional money to give $50,000 to the Symphony to help establish the Seattle Opera, as well as $15,000 to the Council on Aging and $1,000 to the Seattle Chorale. In the subsequent 45 years, PONCHO has raised over $33 million for more than 200 Seattle-area arts organizations. Significant beneficiaries other than the Symphony and Opera have included the Pacific Northwest Ballet, Seattle Art Museum, Seattle Repertory Theatre, and ACT.

Brendan Kiley of Seattle alternative weekly The Stranger, writing on the occasion of PONCHO executive director Gordon Hamilton's forced departure in July 2008, sees PONCHO as gradually shifting from being a "deep donor" to large arts institutions into a "broad donor" whose beneficiaries have come to include smaller groups.
