= Dogtown Poetry Theater =

- Address: Seattle; United States

The Dogtown Poetry Theater was a short-lived but influential venue in mid-Seventies Seattle. Organized by Don Wilsun and Joe Scozzy as a grass-roots outlet for poetic expression across cultural and societal boundaries, it became an alternative to the academic reading series held by University of Washington professor Nelson Bentley.

Dogtown featured free readings every Sunday afternoon in a large vacant space below Seattle's signature Pike Place Market featuring one wall of windows giving views of the generally rainy and gray Puget Sound, a pot-bellied iron stove to drive the chill and damp away and heat the pot of free Market Spice tea, and a piano. Readings were often attended by viewers seeking heat and a free cup of wine, tourists who wandered down from the Market, poetry fans, and a cadre of young Seattle poets.

Many authors read at Dogtown including Steven "Jesse" Bernstein, an artist who toured with punk groups and recorded albums on the Sub Pop label. Other poets who contributed to Dogtown and went on to future writing of note were Charlie Burks (the coordinator of the first Bumbershoot Writers in Performance Competition in 1981), Britt Robson, Hans Skott-Myre, Linton Robinson, Cliff Finity, and Don Wilsun (who went on to found the Red Sky Poetry Theatre). Tom Waits and Patty Smith were cited as influences by many of the poets mentioned above, as well as Burroughs, Bukowski, and other artists in the areas of beat, hip, and grunge.

Dogtown's performances only took place for a little over a year, from 1975 to 1976. The material presented there included drunken performances, romance poems, academic forms, and performance art (such as playing recordings of conversations in Market bars while passing around trash and cigarette butts from the tables where they were taped). The general feel tended towards a retro-beat aesthetic.
