= Bart Baxter =

American poet living in London, UK

Bart Baxter is an American poet living in London, UK. He has been published in ERGO! (a paperback anthology of work by Bumbershoot writers), Seattle Review, Red Cedar Review, The Ohio Poetry Review and Raven Chronicles. The Washington Poets Association created the Bart Baxter Award in 1998 which "recognizes poetry on the stage, not just on the page." Baxter was on the board of Red Sky Poetry Theatre for three years from 1989 to 1991.

== Books ==
- A Man, Ostensibly, Egress Studio Press, 2004
- The Man with St. Vitus' Dance, Floating Bridge Press, Seattle, 2000 (includes CD with QuickTime video of Bart performing title poem)
- Sonnets from the Mare Imbrium, Floating Bridge Press, Seattle, 1999
- Peace for the Arsonist, Bacchae Press, Bristolville, Ohio, 1995
- Driving Wrong, Poetry Around Press, Seattle, 1992.

== Awards ==
- 1994 Hart Crane Award (Kent State University)
- 1994 MTV Poetry Grand Slam
- 1995 Charles Proctor Award (Washington State)
- 1996 Carlin Aden Award
- 1997 William Stafford Award
- 1998 Seattle Poetry Grand Slam
