= 619 Western =

Building in Seattle, Washington, USA

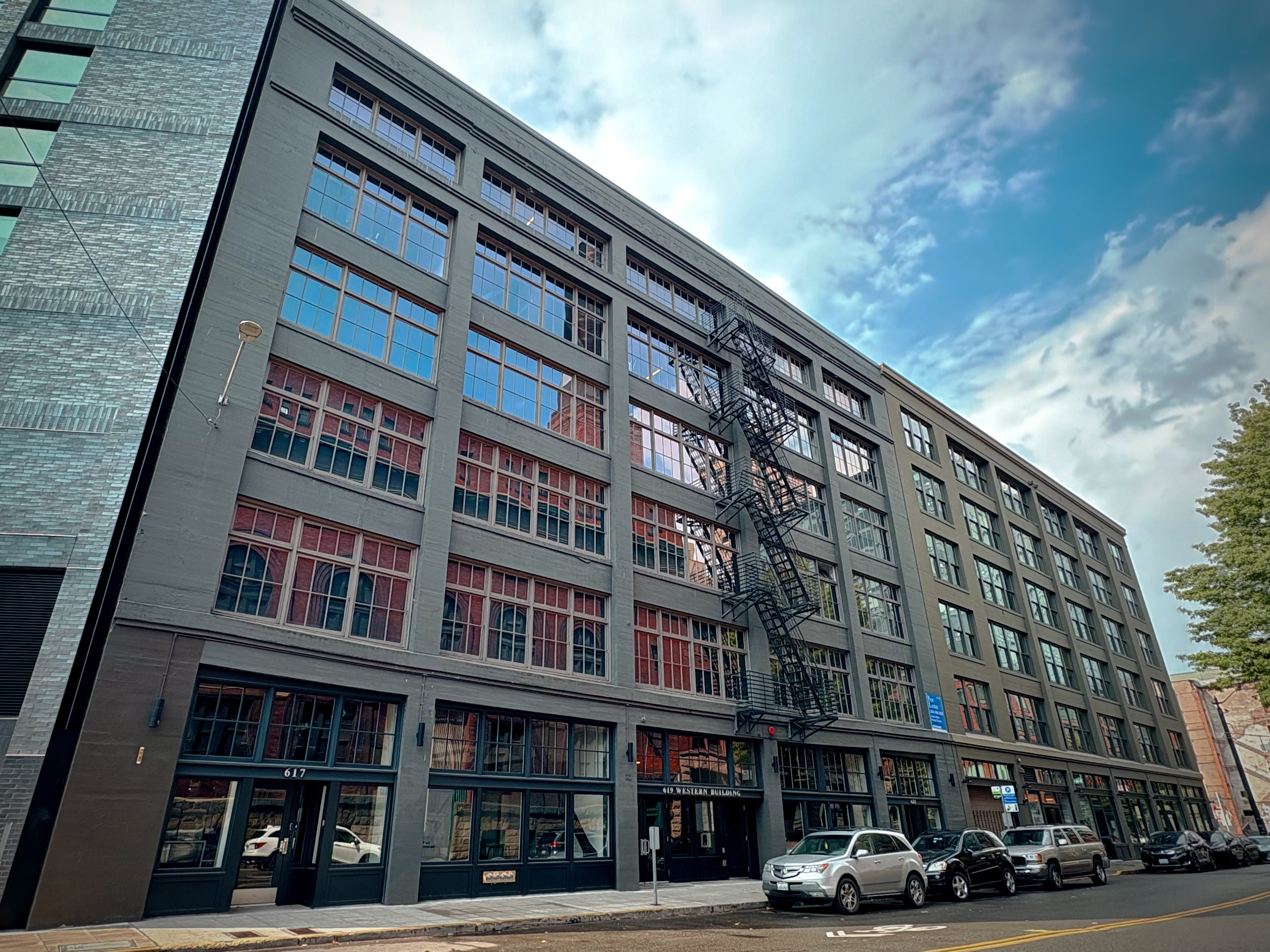
- Building exterior in September 2025
- Interactive map of the 619 Western area

General information
- Location: Seattle, United States
- Coordinates: 47.6024°N 122.3358°W

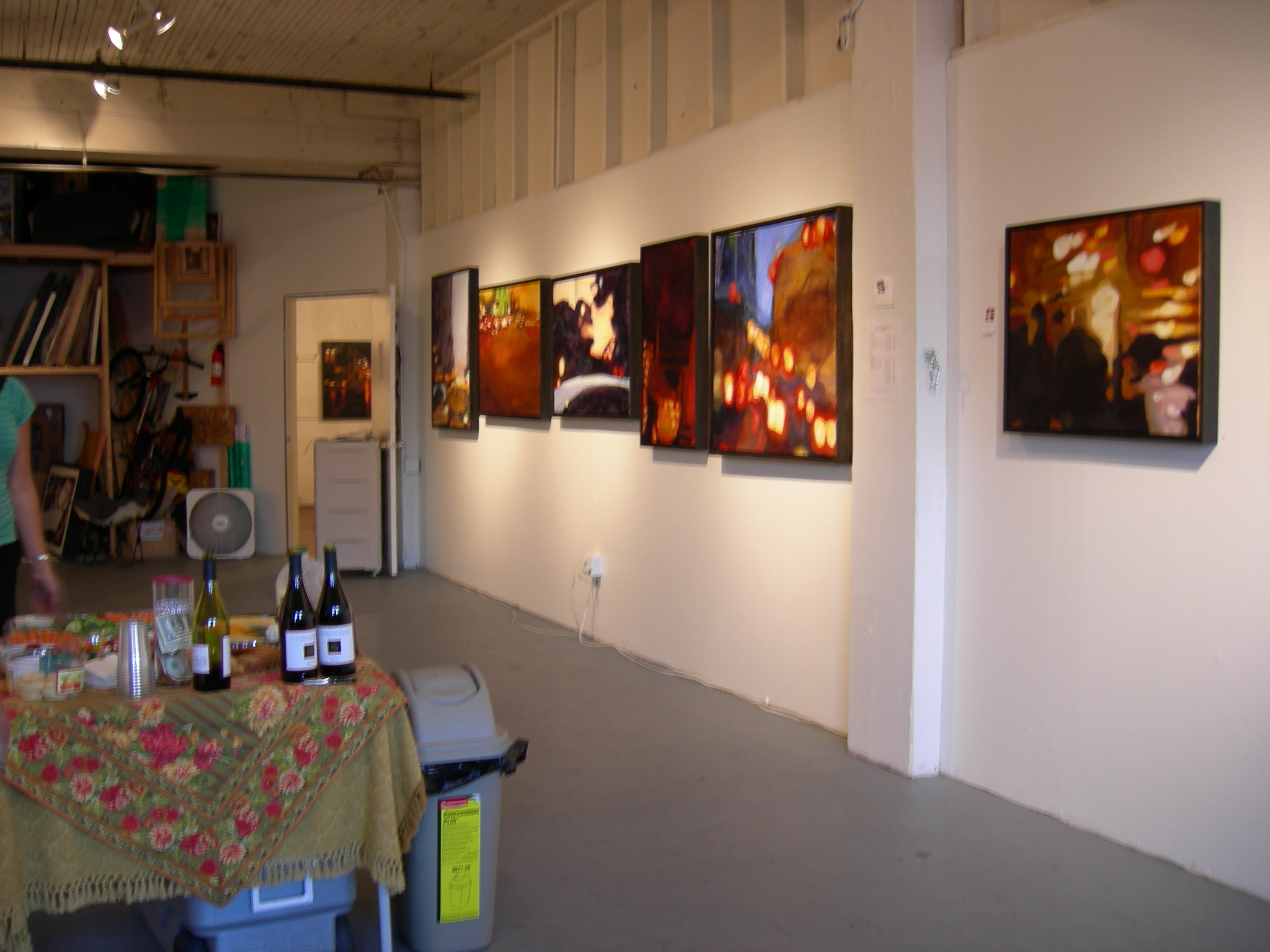
Interior of the building

619 Western is a building at 619 Western Avenue in Seattle.

From 1980 to 2011 it hosted an artist community.
