= Red Sky Poetry Theatre =

Poetry festivals in the United States

Red Sky Poetry Theatre was the longest running live weekly poetry series and open mic in Seattle history.

== Sunrise ==
Don Wilsun, who previously co-founded Dogtown Poetry Theater with Joe Scozzy, was a driving force in the founding of Red Sky Poetry Theatre. Along with Joe Keppler, Tom Parson, who also started the Bumbershoot Small Press Fair in 1977, and Judith Roche, whose home was used as a meeting place to plan Red Sky Poetry Theatre, Wilsun formed the core of what would become Red Sky Poetry Theatre. Prior to forming Red Sky Poetry Theatre, Wilsun held ad hoc readings which were simply called Poetry Theatre. Wilsun named his labor of love Red Sky because one day he was putting up flyers for his Poetry Theatre in the Pike Place Market and as he was doing so, saw an amazing red sunset. He wrote a poem at the Soup and Salad called Red Sky. It inspired him to name his Poetry Theatre, Red Sky. The first Red Sky Poetry Theatre reading was May 24, 1981.

Bill Shively, Joseph Keppler, Judith Roche, Matt Lennon, and Tom Parsons joined the Red Sky Poetry Theatre board in 1981 and were listed in the original incorporation documents as board members in 1982 with Don Wilsun as President and acting agent. Red Sky Poetry Theatre was a Non-profit Organization existing solely to promote and encourage poetry performance and Performance Art as well as other arts. Elliott Bronstein would join the board a short time later.

Trudy Mercer, an early editor of SkyViews, joined the Red Sky Poetry Theatre board in 1982, the same day Marion Kimes and Michael Hureaux were voted onto the board.

Kay Kinghammer, who performed in Burlesque Theatre and JT Stewart, who formerly taught at Seattle Central Community College, were also part of the early meetings to create Red Sky Poetry Theatre but never actually on the board.

Other early affiliated authors not officially on the Red Sky Poetry Theatre board included Mark Svenvold, who recently did a presentation at the Modern Language Association about the influence of Red Sky Poetry Theatre on the Literary World. Charlie Potts, another well known author, would frequently read for Red Sky Poetry Theatre. Paul Hunter, who collaborated with Red Sky Poetry Theatre early on, would officially become a board member in 1993. These authors added much to the early Red Sky Poetry Theatre creative process.

== Bumbershoot ==
Charlie Burks, the coordinator of the first Bumbershoot Writers in Performance Competition in 1981, was not officially on the board but collaborated with Red Sky Poetry Theatre on a regular basis. Burks' influence on the collaborative efforts of Red Sky Poetry Theatre was substantial. The expression "Poet's Gymnasium", in the context of Red Sky Poetry Theatre as a forum for perfecting one's poetry, is attributed to Burks. Red Sky Poetry Theatre joined Burks in judging the Writers in Performance contests that would decide who, out of hundreds, would read at Bumbershoot. Bumbershoot Writers in Performance Competitions continue to this day, although without Red Sky Poetry Theatre. However, former board member Judith Roche coordinated the Bumbershoot Literary Arts Festival for One Reel after Red Sky Poetry Theatre discontinued the Bumbershoot Association.

== Periodicals ==
Bill Shively edited the very first Open Sky in which writers and visual artists of any sort could contribute 400 pages to be included in the magazine. Red Sky Poetry Theatre considered its collective efforts to be more conducive to the creative process, the whole being greater than the sum of its parts. Essentially, Open Sky wasn't edited so much as compiled. Shively's brainchild, Open Sky, eventually became a quarterly publication. The only person to submit to all twelve issues of Open Sky was author Dann O'Keefe. Open Sky became Open Sound in 1989 with 200 pages. Ezra Mark was the editor of the first Open Sound. Ezra Mark was later on the board of Subtext, another poetry series.

Shively created and edited the early SkyViews magazine which started out as a monthly newsletter with 'guest editors' but became a full-fledged poetry magazine shortly after the first issues. Charlie Burks added a 'Sunday Supplement' one month when he was guest editor that was much admired by the Pacific Northwest literary public. Trudy Mercer took over the compilation of this monthly magazine in 1984. Mercer published Redlines as well as working with Red Sky Poetry Theatre. SkyViews was renamed Parallel Discourse in 1989 with Phoebe Bosché and James Maloney as editors although it still referred to itself as SkyViews inside the first Parallel Discourse pages. Parallel Discourse soon spun off of Red Sky Poetry Theatre completely and was solely published by Bosché and Maloney. Swale Magazine was edited by Bosché and Roberto Valenza but it was not actually a Red Sky Poetry Theatre publication. Swale was well received.

Red Sky Poetry Theatre also had its own imprint called, of course, Red Sky Press. It published books of collected poets such as Red Sky Morning as well as publishing the Bumbershoot Anthology, a collection of the poems of the Bumbershoot Literary Contest performers, in 1984 and 1985. Visual Art was always part of the Red Sky Poetry Theatre milieu and many publications were replete with images such as the art of Keppler, Lennon, Roberto Valenza, or Grace Dager and many others. The line between poetry and visual art was consistently crossed as the two forms merged into something unique. There were many other publications by Red Sky Poetry Theatre affiliated authors that are too numerous to list.

== Early history ==
When Don Wilsun withdrew from regular participation in Red Sky Poetry Theatre, the Secretary of State of Washington State listed Elliott Bronstein as the acting Agent for Red Sky Poetry Theatre and Marion Kimes as the acting President and Treasurer. Red Sky Poetry Theatre presented a continuous live poetry series for more than the 25 years that it was incorporated. This puts Red Sky Poetry Theatre on the same par as City Lights Books, which has been running a poetry series since 1953, and Nuyorican Poets Cafe, which has had a series since 1973. Red Sky Poetry Theatre still does occasional Red Sky Redux at the Hopvine Pub or venues such as the Richard Hugo House. Red Sky Poetry Theatre board membership changed much over the course of 25 incorporated years.

Red Sky Poetry Theatre held their first readings at the Soames Dunn Building in the Pike Place Market and continued there for more than a year, then moving to the Pike Development Authority meeting room for 6 months. From there, Red Sky Poetry Theatre stayed in the Pike Place Market and started reading in December, 1983 at the Soup and Salad Cafe overlooking Puget Sound. This was the first venue where people who weren't looking for Red Sky Poetry Theatre could come across them and walk in.

Michael Hureaux, who was an active member of Red Sky Poetry Theatre, was the instigator that convinced Red Sky Poetry Theatre to move to the Five-O Tavern on Capitol Hill in December 1984, thus changing the ambiance of the performance stage, when the Soup and Salad turned into the Soundview Cafe. Hureaux had already staged Poem People: Poetry Night at the Five-O Tavern and found the location conducive to poetry. (The Five-O later became the Hopvine Pub). The Five-O was an early venue for the fledgling Seattle Grunge Rock scene. It is among venues where the influence of Steven Jesse Bernstein, on Grunge first occurred. Bernstein had been reading at Dogtown Poetry Theater prior to Red Sky Poetry Theatre and was always an influence in Seattle and the West Coast.

Hureaux left the board in 1986 to pursue other interests, including becoming a member of the Choreopoets.

The renowned Pioneer Square Theater hosted Red Sky Poetry Theatre Works In Progress such as Charlie Burks "War Babies", in 1983 and 1984. Pioneer Square Theater continued working with Red Sky Poetry Theatre affiliated authors such as Roberto Valenza, although the connections with Red Sky Poetry Theatre were no longer direct.

In fact, Red Sky Poetry Theatre was so involved with the Seattle performance culture, that it was hard to tell where Red Sky Poetry Theatre ended and another organization began. Members worked with On the Boards performing in the 1982 Poetry Marathon to benefit Amnesty International. Matt Lennon hosted a monthly reading at the Comet Tavern, where Red Sky Poetry Theatre would cross pollinate with the Actor's Table. Joe Keppler hosted readings at the Greenwood Gallery before he left in 1983 to form "Poets, Painters, Composers" It was this flexibility which made it so easy to move venues as needed without harming the free-spirited, collaborative nature of Red Sky Poetry Theatre.

Phoebe Bosché and Roberto Valenza became Red Sky Poetry Theatre board members in 1984 and were influential in taking Red Sky Poetry Theatre in new directions toward Performance Poetry. Bosché recently edited Art and Politics Now Cultural Activism in a Time of Crisis. Bosché currently publishes Raven Chronicles with Philip H. Red Eagle.

Valenza, was a flamboyant character, who along with Bernstein, Gary Heffern, and others, encouraged heckling of his readings. Heckling gave a spontaneity and comedic value to performances although many of the other readers frowned upon it.

The 1980s found Red Sky Poetry Theatre receiving grants from the King County Arts Commission, the Allied Arts Foundation, the Seattle Arts Commission and 911 Media Arts Center, which allowed Red Sky Poetry Theatre to expand into other media.

== Broadcasts ==
There were two radio shows affiliated with Red Sky Poetry Theatre in the early years, both on KRAB-FM from 1981 through 1983. There was Red Sky Radio hosted by Matt Lennon and Art Talk hosted by Don Wilsun.

Red Sky Poetry Theatre would branch off into Public Access Television hosted by TCI Cable in 1985 starting with the Paramount Poets by Alan Goodin and Martina Poth Goodin, both Red Sky Poetry Theatre board members since 1984. They would continue the tradition of video poetry with Cactus Poets, the show starting production in 1987. Red Sky Poetry Theatre Live would air, also on TCI, in 1988. These three video poetry series aired frequently until 1992.

margareta waterman (lowercase intentional) would join the Red Sky Poetry Theatre board in 1989, bringing with her nine muses books and producing Manifest Arts, a series of Poetry and Performance Art broadcast on TCI. nine muses published many Red Sky Poetry Theatre authors. waterman left the board in 1994 to travel and perform around the country.

== An Alternative To Loud Boats ==
Members of Red Sky Poetry Theatre were instrumental in creating An Alternative To Loud Boats, which was a Performance Art event that coincided with the Seattle Seafair Albert Lee Cup Hydroplane Races, started in 1985. It soon had a different theme every year such as 'Censorship' or 'Sanctuary' (from the first Iraq War). Between 1988 and 1991, Alternative to Loud Boats was helped along by grants from the King County Arts Commission written by Cydney Gillis of Arts Focus. Arts Focus was a popular Seattle magazine dedicated to the Northwest literary and performance culture. Alternative to Loud Boats continued for ten years until 1994.

== Musical collaboration ==
Many musicians worked with Red Sky Poetry Theatre, including Wally Shoup, who improvised saxophone on stage with poets and Michael Monhart, also a saxophonist. Pete Leinonen recorded many of the Red Sky poets along with The Pete Leinonen Band. The Bill Shively Band, was a mainstay of Red Sky Poetry Theatre from the beginning. Don Wilsun, himself, played the congas and would often recite as he drummed. There are recordings of much of this work, as well as recordings of spoken word.

== Influence in Seattle ==
For all of the influence Red Sky Poetry Theatre had on the West Coast and national literary world, it was still considered "underground" by the academic establishment. This was due to the controversial reputation of many of the performers, as Red Sky Poetry Theatre allowed anyone to openly state anything about the society in which we live. Many of these performers would have no formal academic training and not everyone approved of this approach but it would contribute to the success of Red Sky Poetry Theatre.

Karen Finneyfrock was one of the Red Sky Poetry Theatre featured readers who would become MC of the Seattle Poetry Slam between 2001 and 2005. Red Sky Poetry Theatre poets were more cooperative at first and not competitive as the Slams were. (The only competitions Red Sky Poetry Theatre would do would be to decide who would be reading at the Bumbershoot Literary Festival. Hundreds applied.) Kathleen Daviduke AKA Katushka, a frequent reader at Open Mics, would win a place in the 1992 Poetry Bus: The Metro Moving Poetry Series. Matthew Stadler also was a frequent featured reader. Ira Cohen, Sam Hamill and many other well known readers read at Red Sky Poetry Theatré. The list of influential or award winning poets who read at Red Sky Poetry Theatre is extensive.

While Red Sky Poetry Theatre was housed at the Ditto Tavern in the early 1990s, it had such an effect on the Belltown neighborhood that the local art magazine, Belltown's Brain Fever Dispatch would dedicate a full page to Red Sky Poetry Theatre for several months in the early 1990s.

Red Sky would continue with board members leaving and new members joining. Peter Sawicki AKA Tobeimean Peter would join the board in 1985 bringing his artistic flare to the Open Sky magazine with his images on the cover. Peter left the following year to pursue his art. Martina and Alan Goodin would leave in 1992 and Trudy Mercer, instrumental in the publication of early SkyViews and Open Sound, would leave in 1994. Stephen Thomas, who owned Cabaret Hegel which was a performance venue from 84 to 87, would become active in Red Sky Poetry Theatre. Although Thomas was not officially on the board, in 1981 he was a judge for the Bumbershoot Literary Competition. Thomas continued working closely with Red Sky Poetry Theatre until 1997. Steve Potter would join the Red Sky Poetry Theatre board in 1994 and stayed until the end.

Paul Hunter was an intrinsic member of the board, but left in 2004, the year before the last reading. Paul Nelson, who was also a DJ at KPLU-FM and KNDD-FM as well as other stations, would become a Red Sky Poetry Theatre board member in 1997. Nelson was on the board at the end.

Nelson, Bachman, Bart Baxter, another Red Sky Poetry Theatre board member from 1989 through 91, and board member Clarice Keegan were also on the board of the now disbanded Washington Poets Association. Keegan had previously been on the Seattle Poetry Slam board before joining Red Sky Poetry Theatre.

Jesse Minkert would join the board in 1998 and stayed until the end. Minkert recorded readings at the Globe Cafe and released a CD called Red Sky At Night: Poets in Seattle in 2002. Others associated with the Red Sky Poetry Theatre board at this time were Diane Westergaard, who was on the board for a year starting in 2004, Allison Durazzi, also on the board, Belle Randall, a frequent featured reader, David Lloyd Whited, whose book 3 & 1 was published by Red Sky Press, and many others continued the Red Sky Poetry Theatre tradition of an unfettered open mic.

== Sunset ==
Don Wilsun, who according to Trudy Mercer was the 'Father of Red Sky Poetry Theatre', stayed on the board until 2001 although he started to participate much less after 1991. He died on May 8, 2003, taking with him much of the original Spirit of Red Sky Poetry Theatre. Wilsun's work is now in an Archive at the University of Washington.

Roberto Valenza left the World on January 19, 2010 leaving much of his work to the University of Washington.

Marion Kimes, the Grande Dame and guiding light of Red Sky Poetry Theatre, died on March 13, 2014.

Bill Shively, founding member of Red Sky Poetry Theatre, who formed the Bill Shively Band and others, died on September 28, 2014.

The works of everyone affiliated with Red Sky Poetry Theatre or nine muses books is being archived at the University of Washington. Most of this growing body of works by various authors, musicians, and artists has not yet been digitized. (A History about Red Sky Poetry Theatre written for that collection, contains inaccuracies which are corrected in this document.)

Red Sky Poetry Theatre went through many venues after it left the Five-O Tavern in the late 1980s. It moved to the Cause Celebre Cafe, also on Capitol Hill, for a few months, then moved to the Still Life Cafe in Fremont, "The Center of the Universe". It moved to Anna's Cafe briefly. From there Red Sky Poetry Theatre moved around but landed at Squid Row in the late 1980s. It showed in other venues, as well, moving in 1990 to the Ditto Tavern in Belltown, Seattle. Once the Ditto Tavern folded, Red Sky Poetry Theatre moved back up to Capitol Hill to the Globe Cafe. Robin Schultz, owner of the Globe Cafe, also published Poetry Around Press which published many Red Sky Poetry Theatre authors. In 2005, the Globe changed hands and the last continuous Red Sky Poetry Theatre reading was on October 23, 2005.

Paul Nelson, Teresa Bachman AKA Alley Greymond, who was on the Red Sky Poetry Theatre board between 1996 and 1998, Phoebe Bosché, and others have brought back Red Sky Poetry for occasional special events called Red Sky Redux.
