= Caroline Mytinger =

American painter

- Caroline Mytinger c. 1929
- Born: March 6, 1897; Sacramento, California
- Died: November 3, 1980 (aged 83)
- Known for: Painting
- Spouse: George Stober (m. 1920)

Caroline Mytinger (March 6, 1897 — November 3, 1980), was an American portrait painter born in Sacramento, California, and raised in Cleveland, Ohio. She is best known for her paintings of indigenous people in the South Seas during the late 1920s. These paintings are in the custody of the Phoebe Apperson Hearst Museum of Anthropology on UC Berkeley's campus in Berkeley, CA. Her work was featured in the museum's 2008 exhibition "Face to Face: Looking at Objects That Look at You."

== Biography ==
In March 1926 she traveled to the Solomon Islands and Papua-New Guinea, with her childhood friend Margaret Warner. They only brought $400 between them, planning "to support themselves by painting portraits of white colonials encountered along the way."

She produced paintings and two books about their experience. One notable painting was a portrait of a canoe builder named Iomai.

Mytinger and Warner both returned to the United States in 1930. The two books were published in the 1940s. In 1943 Mytinger bought a one-bedroom studio and became a permanent resident of Monterey, California an art colony on California's Pacific coastline.

The 2017 documentary Headhunt Revisited: With Brush, Canvas, and Camera features Seattle photographer and filmmaker Michele Westmorland traveling to the South Pacific to follow Mytinger's footsteps. The film premiered in Port Moresby, Papua New Guinea.

== Selected bibliography ==
- Head-hunting in the Solomon Islands, Caroline Mytinger, Macmillan Publishers, 1942
- New Guinea Headhunt, Caroline Mytinger, Macmillan Publishers, 1946

== Sources ==
- Smithsonian, April 2006, p. 82–89.
- A Gibson Girl in New Guinea, retrieved June 25, 2017
