= An Alternative To Loud Boats =

An Alternative to Loud Boats was a performance art festival coinciding with the annual Seattle Seafair Albert Lee Cup Hydroplane Races held in late July or early August. It was organized by Roberto Valenza and Phoebe Bosche who were also involved with Red Sky Poetry Theatre.

In 1989, Cydney Gills of Arts Focus magazine joined with An Alternative to Loud Boats. Gillis assisted in writing grants. An Alternative To Loud Boats received grants from the King County Arts Commission in 1991.

An Alternative to Loud Boats ran for 10 years, each year having a different theme.

== 1987 ==
An Alternative To Loud Boats celebrates the arts

== 1988 ==
Censorship

== 1989 ==
The Struggle For Freedom

== 1990 ==
Sanctuary

== 1991 ==
Between Two Fires

== 1993 ==
No Garnish
