= Steven Jesse Bernstein =

American poet

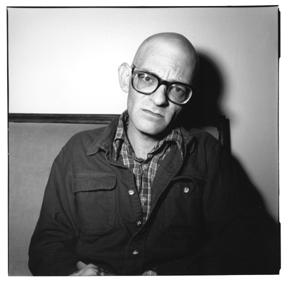
Steven "Jesse" Bernstein

Steven Jay "Jesse" Bernstein (December 4, 1950 – October 22, 1991) was an American underground writer and performance artist. He remains famous for his recordings with Sub Pop records and correspondence with William S. Burroughs. Bernstein's substance abuse issues and mental illness contributed to his provocative local celebrity, though they ultimately culminated in his suicide.

== History ==
Bernstein was born in Los Angeles, California. His substance abuse issues began as the aftermath of his stay in the Camarillo State Hospital in Camarillo, California as an adolescent. He moved to Seattle, Washington in January 1967, where he adopted the moniker Jesse, and began performing and self-publishing chapbooks of his poetry, the first of which was Choking On Sixth, 1979). Bernstein would become something of an icon to many in Seattle's underground music scene. Notable fans included Kurt Cobain and Oliver Stone. Though often noted for his connection to grunge and punk rock, Bernstein saw himself primarily as a poet and his live performances in Seattle, such as his regular readings at the Dogtown Poetry Theater and Red Sky Poetry Theatre, were influential in Seattle, and he is credited as a major influence by many local poets from his era.

Bernstein's mental illness was not as alarming as it might have been off the stage, as his drug-reinforced manic episodes were harnessed and channeled into engrossing, often perverse, entertainment. He opened for music acts such as Nirvana, Big Black, Soundgarden, U-Men, and Cows. According to Regina Hackett, art critic for the Seattle Post-Intelligencer:

He read poems from a stage with a live rodent in his mouth, its tail twitching as baseline punctuation. He tried to cut his heart out in order to hold it in his hands and calm it down. He once urinated on a heckler and tended to throw things: beer bottles, manuscripts, drumsticks, his wallet, a sandwich.

Some of Bernstein's bizarre on-stage antics were fueled by alcohol and some (like the performance with a mouse), were deliberate. Bernstein was clean and sober from 1981 to 1990, despite the ravages of bipolar disorder and posttraumatic stress disorder.

The concept for the Bernstein album Prison was for Jesse to do a raw live performance at the State Penitentiary Special Offenders unit in Monroe, Washington in 1991. Jesse went with his manager Barbara Buckland, Bruce Pavitt from Sub Pop Records, Grant Alden (then a writer for Rocket magazine and later the co-founder of No Depression magazine), photographer Arthur S. Aubry, and various technical assistance people. None of the session except for the photos taken by Aubry was usable. Sub Pop later contracted Steve Fisk to finish the project. The album was intended to be produced along the same lines as Johnny Cash's At Folsom Prison, but Fisk later decided to score a collection of other Bernstein's recordings with jazz and ambient music, as Bernstein's performance at Monroe was too poor to be released. The album was not completed by the time of Bernstein's death.

On October 22, 1991, at the age of 40, Bernstein committed suicide by stabbing himself in the throat while visiting friends in Neah Bay, Washington, although not simultaneously.

Prison was released on April 1, 1992.

In 1994, one of his recordings, "Me and Her Outside (No No Man)," was used in the film Natural Born Killers.

I Am Secretly an Important Man, a collection of poetry, short stories, and spoken performances, was released in March 1996 by Zero Hour Publishing.

His song A Little Bit of Everything (That Brought Me Down to This), from the Trigger Recordings album, The Sad Bag, was also included on the two-CD set Home Alive, the proceeds from which benefited women's self-defense groups in the Seattle area.

In 2010, filmmaker Peter Sillen released a documentary on Bernstein, I Am Secretly An Important Man.

== Bibliography ==
- Soon Sweet Misery, by Steven Jay Bernstein (self-published, 1978; the preface is dated "june 5, 1978"; 115 pages; collected short pieces)
- Choking on Sixth (Outlaw Press #1 1979)
- Exotic Disasters (Outlaw Press #2 1979)
- A Well-Ordered Room (1980) - A one-woman play written for Lori Larsen.
- A Ghost of His Former Self (Outlaw Press #3 1981)
- The Wraith (1981) (Patio Table Press, Seattle)
- Hermione (1982) (Patio Table Press, Seattle)
- Feast (Spring 1983) - 9 page excerpt of "The Wraith"
- Bumbershoot Anthology (1984) - "Choking on Sixth"
- Swale (November 1984) - "The Housefire"
- Swale (August 1985) - "Face"
- Faux Pas (1987) - "A Cough in the Wrong Place"
- Critics (1988) - Theatrical work written with Susy Schneider.
- Moms (1990) - Theatrical work written with Susy Schneider.
- Semiotext(e) USA edition (1987) - "Main Street USA"
- Skyviews Vol. II No. 3 (1987) - "It Is Fake Statuary"
- Skyviews Vol. II No. 7 (1987) - "Hendrix"
- Skyviews Vol. II No. 9 (1987) - "What Is Poetry, Art or Anarchy"
- Skyviews Vol. II No. 10 (1987) - Letter to the Editor Concerning Good and Bad Poetry.
- Skyviews Vol. III No. 2 (1988) - Article Concerning the Influence of William S. Burroughs.
- Skyviews Vol. III No. 3 (1988) - "Notes on the Audience"
- Pop-Tart, Magazine of Instant Art, Vol. 1 No. 7 (1988) - 1st Installment of unpublished novel "Personal Effects".
- Pop-Tart, Magazine of Instant Art, Vol. 1 No. 8 (1988) - 2nd Installment of unpublished novel "Personal Effects".
- Worcs (Aloud Allowed) #18 (October 1988) - "Taboo"
- The Rocket (July 1988) - "Criminal Mind: Jesse Bernstein Interviews William S. Burroughs"
- The Rocket (October 1988) - "Aids and the Needle User"
- Personal Effects (1989) (Petarade Press, Vancouver, Toronto; Drawings by M. Helen J. Orr)
- Zero Hour No. 2 - (Spring 1989) - "Scrap Junkie: Poem for Executive Toy"
- The Rocket (August 1989) - "She Has Lots of Tattoos: Steven J. Bernstein interviews Kathy Acker"
- The Rocket (June 1990) - "A Conversation with TAD: Steven J. Bernstein interviews TAD"
- Discrete Ephemera (1990) - "Face"
- The Onion As It Is Cooked (October 1990) - "The Onion As It Is Cooked" (Poem printed on pasta)
- Strip Poker (October 1991) - "Strip Poker" (Poem presented inside a wine bottle)
- Noise (1991) - "More Noise, Please!"
- Talking Raven, A Journal of Imaginative Trouble Vol. 3 No. 3 (1993) - "In This Place"
- Bamboo (1994) - "Murdered in the Middle of the Dance"
- Good to Go (1994) - "Sissies Suck It Up (Bad Boys Gulp It Down)"
- Rapture (1995) - "Car Accident"
- I Am Secretly an Important Man (1996)
- More Noise, Please! (Published by Left Bank Books, 1996)

== Discography ==
- Words and Music: Steven Jesse Bernstein and Pete Leinonen (cassette) (Original Cast 1984, 1993)
- Sub Pop 200 - "Come Out Tonight" (Sub Pop 1988)
- "Effects" (cassette) (Self Released 1988)
- "Work-In-Progress #1" (cassette) (Trigger Recordings 1990)
- The Sad Bag (cassette) (Trigger Recordings 1990)
- The Sport/No No Man (12") (Sub Pop 1992)
- Prison (Sub Pop 1992)
- National Public Radio and Interview Excerpts (cassette) (Sub Pop 1992)
- Afternoon Delight! - "This Clouded Heart" (Sub Pop 1992)
- Revolution Come And Gone - "No No Man Pt.2" (Sub Pop 1992)
- Home Alive-The Art Of Self Defense - "It's Just A Little Bit Of Everything (That's Brought Me Down To This)" (Epic Records 1996)

== Filmography ==
Actor
Year	Film	Role	Notes
1987	Gorefest	The Gorehound	Unreleased and unedited splatter film shot on VHS with a cast consisting of avant garde and underground Seattle artists.
1987	The Last Blast: Big Black's final show	self	A video cassette release of Big Black's final performance on August 11, 1987; at the Georgetown Steam Plant in Seattle. Steven Jesse Bernstein opens the show.
1989	Birthright	Dr. Steiner	Is the head of an asylum in the future where deviants are reconditioned.
1990	Shredder Orpheus	Axel	Lost the use of his hips during an apocalyptic war and sits on a skateboard through the entire film.
1993	Sub Pop Video Network Program 2	self	Music video for "No No Man Part 2".
2010	I Am Secretly An Important Man (documentary)	self	Documentary on his life and art.
