= Ladies Musical Club of Seattle =

Nonprofit organization in Seattle, Washington

The Ladies Musical Club of Seattle (LMC), founded in 1891, is the oldest musical organization in Seattle, Washington. Although it began as a women's organization, it now also accepts men as full members. The LMC is a 501(c)(3) nonprofit.

== History ==
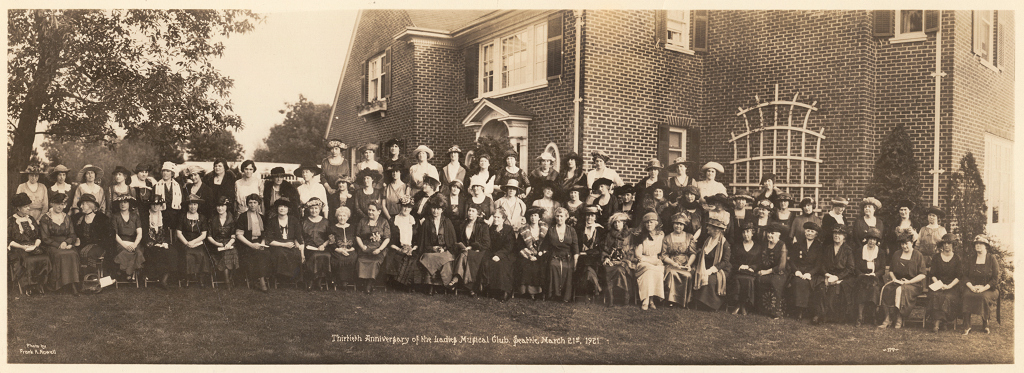
Ladies Musical Club members posing for the club's 30th anniversary, Seattle, 1921

The Ladies Musical Club of Seattle was founded less than two years after the Great Seattle Fire of 1889, and a year after the Ladies Musical Club of Tacoma, which was established in 1890 and is said to have served as a model for it.

Twenty-four women musicians gathered on March 2, 1891, at the home of Ellen Bartlett Bacon to form an organization dedicated to classical music. The initial members were mostly middle-class, married women who had had musical training. Despite an audition being required to join the club, the membership more than doubled within the year.

At a time when it was difficult for women to become professional musicians, the LMC of Seattle provided an opportunity for public performance. In the early years, active members were all required to perform regularly at club events; associate members did not participate as performers, and this latter category of membership was opened to men by the 1893/1894 season.

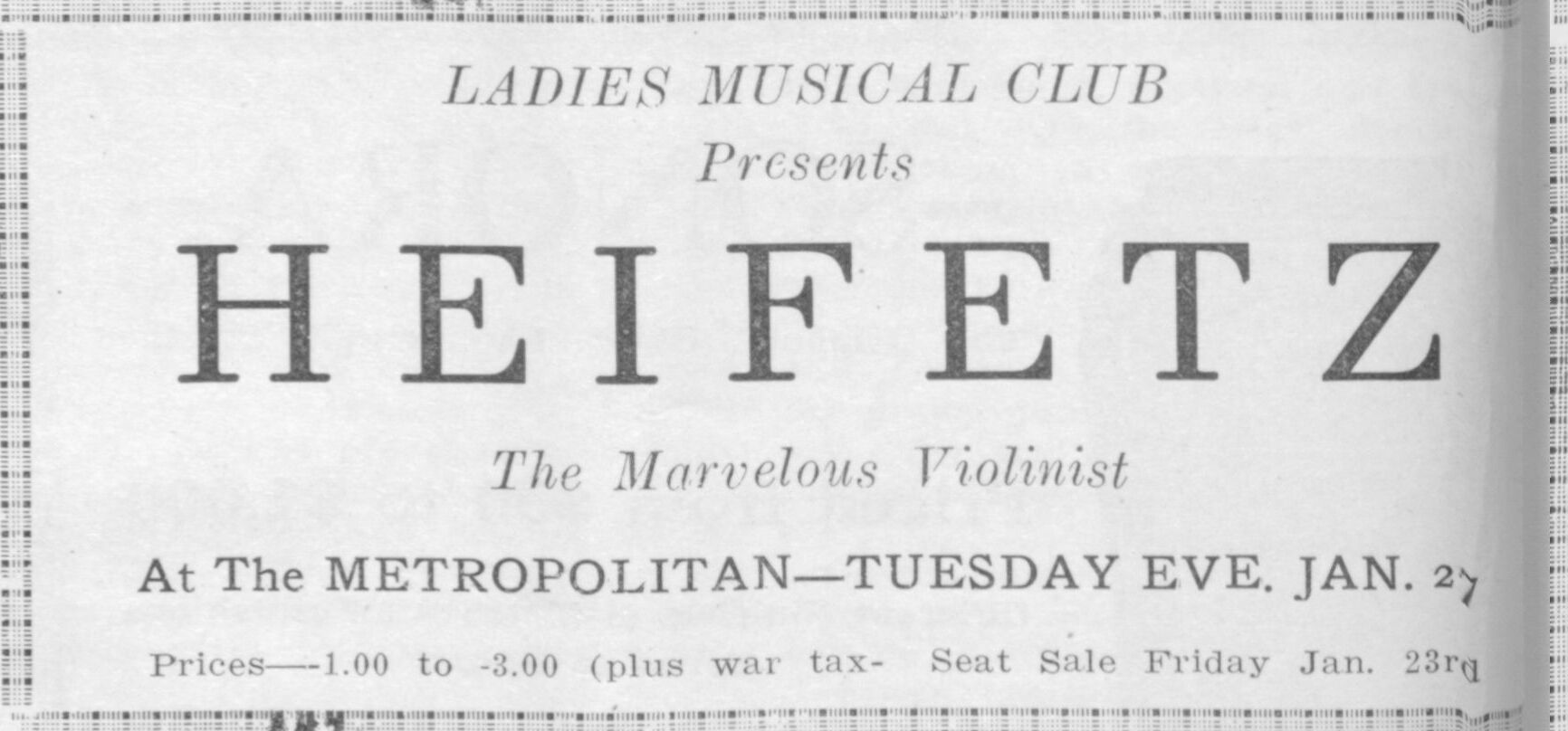
1920 ad for an LMC-sponsored performance by Jascha Heifetz at Seattle's Metropolitan Theatre.

LMC concerts were not confined to struggling women performers. Beginning with the 1900/1901 season, LMC sponsored public concerts by male and female professional artists. From the outset, Rose Gottstein led this aspect of the club's activities, and she continued in this role until 1939, when she died. Between 1900 and 1995, they hosted performances by, among many others, Claudio Arrau, Teresa Carreño, Geraldine Farrar, Sergei Rachmaninoff, Fritz Kreisler, Jascha Heifetz, Marian Anderson, Igor Stravinsky, Yehudi Menuhin, Pablo Casals, Kirsten Flagstad, Arthur Rubinstein, Vladimir Horowitz, Joshua Bell, Emmanuel Ax, Elly Ameling, Marilyn Horne, and Nadja Salerno-Sonnenberg. However, eventually, the cost of putting on concerts by major stars exceeded the club's capacity, and they partnered with the University of Washington to host classical music concerts at the university's Meany Hall.

When the LMC began, Seattle had neither a symphony orchestra, an opera company, nor a notable school of music. The LMC brought, on a regular basis, concerts unlike what the city had seen previously. These included the Chicago Symphony Orchestra (1901/1902 season), Walter Damrosch and the New York Symphony Orchestra (1907/1908 season), and an entire Italian opera company (1920/1921 season). The LMC also provided financial help to both the Seattle Symphony (founded 1903) and the Cornish School (founded 1914, now Cornish College of the Arts) in their early years. Cornish School founder Nellie Cornish was a member.

== Present day ==
As of 2016, the LMC had 150 members. As of 2023 it sponsors roughly sixty solo and chamber music concerts per year in a variety of venues in the Seattle area, with a season running from October to May. These concerts are free to the public.

In addition, the LMC sponsors the Frances Walton Competition for classical musicians ages 20–35, both solo and small ensembles. The competition is open to musicians from the Northwestern United States and California, including players of string instruments, piano, woodwinds, brass, voice, marimba, and recorders, and offers cash prizes and performance opportunities, including Classical KING-FM ("Classical KING FM").

The LMC also sponsors classical concerts in under-served communities and schools without music programs across the state of Washington. In recent years, these have sometimes gone beyond classical music, especially in their schools' programs where, for example, in 2016–2017 they sponsored a set of performances by step-dancing group Step Afrika! as well as a more obvious choice, Calidore String Quartet. Other 21st-century programs in the schools have included Miro Quartet, The Nile Project, SO Percussion, Martha Redbone, and the Daedalus String Quartet.

== Competition and tour ==
The Frances Walton Competition was started as the LMC Scholarship Competition-Award program in 1985 by cellist Frances Walton with the goal to bring great classical music to rural areas of Washington State. The competition is open for musicians between the ages 20 to 35 in the categories Brass, Marimba, Piano, Recorder, String, Voice, Woodwind and chamber ensemble of 2–5 musicians. The award package consists of monetary prizes, live performances on Classical KING-FM radio, and an outreach and recital tour throughout Washington State. The competition performances are open to the public.
