= Bumbershoot =

Annual music festival

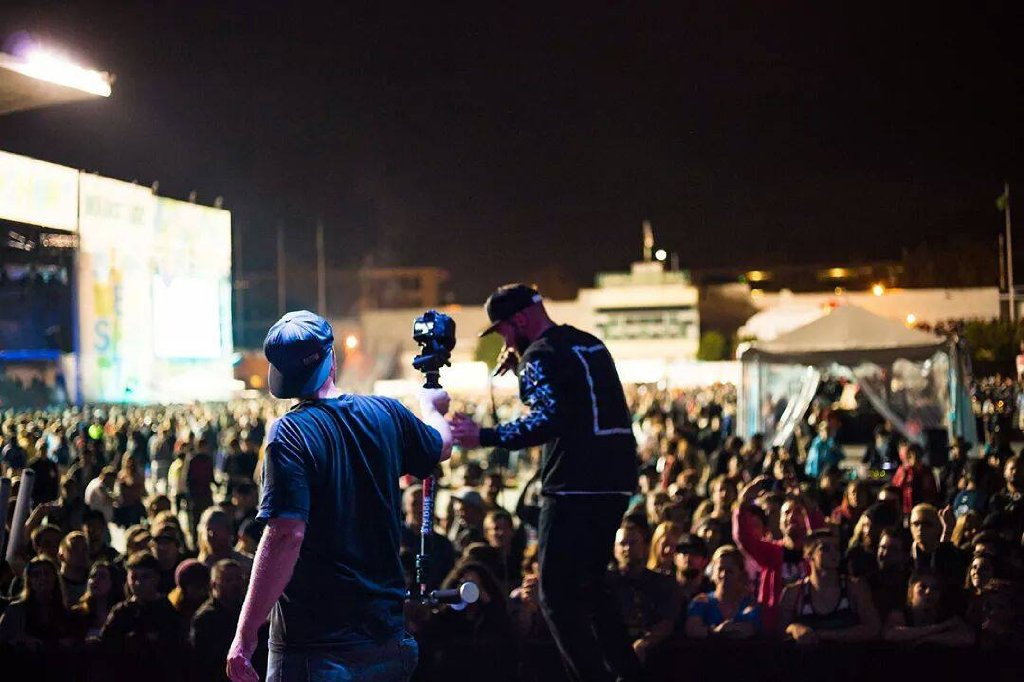
- RA Scion at Bumbershoot 2016, filmed by Aaron RF Anderson
- Genre: Variety
- Dates: Labor Day weekend
- Locations: Seattle, Washington
- Years active: 1971–2019, 2023–present
- Founders: City of Seattle
- Website: bumbershoot.com

Bumbershoot is an annual international music and arts festival held in Seattle, Washington. One of North America's largest such festivals, it takes place every Labor Day weekend (leading up to and including the first Monday of September) at the 74-acre (299,000 m^{2}) Seattle Center, which was built for the 1962 World's Fair. Seattle Center includes both indoor theaters and outdoor stages.

== History ==
=== The early years ===
Bumbershoot began as a city-funded ($25,000 budget) arts and music festival called "Mayor's Arts Festival", also known as "Festival '71", held at Seattle Center on August 13–15, 1971. This event had a total attendance of 125,000 visitors. Amidst the local economic depression triggered by the near collapse of Boeing, the festival attempted to revive local spirits, and was the largest event held in Seattle Center since the 1962 World's Fair. Talk radio host Irving Clark Jr. chaired the fair committee, and avant-garde impresario Anne Focke used one-fifth of the budget for light shows (which incorporated lasers, still something of a novelty at that time), computer graphics, enormous inflatable soft sculptures by the Land Truth Company, and an electronic jam session. Other events included dance, theater, folk music, arts and crafts, art cars, body painting, a Miss Hot Pants Contest, amateur motorcycle races, and one out-of-town performer: country singer Sheb Wooley.

In 1972, "Festival '72", held on July 21–23, took in 175,000 guests. In 1973, the festival adopted the present name "Bumbershoot", grew to five days, and pulled in 200,000 visitors. National acts included Cal Tjader, Joe Venuti, and John Handy. In 1974 it grew again, to 10 days and 325,000 visitors. The festival opened with a "Renaissance Processional" for the kilometer or so from downtown to the center; Mayor Wes Uhlman and most of the city council participated that year, in roles ranging from clowning to reading children's stories aloud to, in the mayor's case, running the Lost Child Center. Another prominent Bumbershoot event from this era was the Bumbernationals Artists' Soapbox Derby, which continued into the early 1980s. 1975's 11-day festival was produced by Parks Department employee John Chambless, a former University of Washington professor of history and philosophy who had produced the 1968 Sky River Rock Festival, a Pacific Northwest hippie-era festival.

=== The late-1970s retreat ===
With declining government grant support, Bumbershoot tried to keep afloat on donations and sales of posters, buttons, and T-shirts, but poor weather hurt attendance some years and left the free Festival scrambling for more financially stable options. First, the festival retrenched on the number of days and on bringing in national talent. According to John Chambless, about 25 percent of the 1975 budget went to out-of-town talent; the 1976 festival was nearly 100 percent local and was cut to two weekends; in 1977, it was further cut to just Labor Day weekend; as it happened, in both 1977 and 1978, Labor Day weekend was rainy.

=== One Reel takes over ===
In 1980, the city brought in Northwest non-profit organization One Reel to produce the event. A mid-1980s attempt by Seattle Center itself to wrest back control was overruled by the City Council.

In the early 1980s, One Reel worked with Red Sky Poetry Theatre (RSPT) which ran many of the Literary Arts aspects of Bumbershoot for several years. RSPT would hold competitions to determine the local talent that would read on the performance stage. This was a precursor to the Poetry slam.

According to its website, One Reel originated as a traveling show, "The One Reel Vaudeville Show" in 1972 and was founded by former One Reel president and CEO Norman Langill. One Reel has also operated Teatro ZinZanni, the "Summer Nights" concert series and "Family 4th at Lake Union" events.

As the One Reel Vaudeville Show, the organization had been involved in the event since its second year, 1972, but with their new role as festival producer came big change. Once again, the festival featured headlining national and international talent (acts that year included Emmylou Harris, Chuck Berry, the Art Ensemble of Chicago, Etta James, Clifton Chenier, Eugene Fodor and Martin Mull), but added an admission charge.Initially that admission charge was US$2.50 a day (although there was a "Free Friday", a tradition lasted for over a decade); as of 2007, it had grown to US$40 a day, and to $62 by 2013. Substantial new premium ticket offerings have also been introduced, including Gold and Platinum passes, full-event tickets providing guaranteed inclusive admission to limited-seating events and reserved VIP seating at certain live music venues.

The new formula featured world-class acts while continuing to ground the festival on a bedrock of Pacific Northwest talent. Record numbers of art and music lovers flocked to the multiple indoor and outdoor stages, galleries, and food, art and craft vendors. Artists such as The Eurythmics, James Brown, Spinal Tap and Tina Turner shared the turf with art oddities like the gigantic flying pencil, the Bumbernationals soapbox derby and robotic art. Although initially resistant to hip hop, in the mid-'90s Bumbershoot introduced some of the first large-scale hip hop shows ever held in Seattle, a tradition that's still very much alive. From the ashes of the grunge rock scene came a new brand of Seattle sound; influential alternative rock bands such as Sleater Kinney, Modest Mouse, Death Cab for Cutie and Grand Archives have played Bumbershoot. In the new millennium, international artists have included groups such as Baba Maal, The Grand Kabuki Theatre of Japan, and an Ethiopian youth circus. The One Reel Film Festival, held within Bumbershoot, celebrates American independent film shorts. Bumbershoot incorporated new arts forms such as poetry slams and break dancing as well as older arts such as circus, contortion, aerial, and street theater.

One Reel signed a three-year programming and promotional agreement in 2008 with AEG Live, one of the largest for-profit international promoters of rock concerts and large events. The deal allowed AEG to assist One Reel with booking musical acts and sponsorship but ultimately proved unfruitful for both parties.

As the region's largest single showcase for regional talent, Bumbershoot became a cultural tastemaker. The festival—which has become Seattle's longest-lived music and arts festival—paved the way for other Seattle-area outdoor events, festivals, and happenings. Many of these, such as the Northwest Folklife Festival that premiered at Seattle Center on Memorial Day weekend nine months after the first Bumbershoot, have become established traditions in their own right.

=== AEG Presents takes over ===
After several years of financial trouble, AEG Live took over as lead promoter in 2015, with One Reel providing supporting programming. AEG had previously taken on a secondary production role from 2007 to 2009 during which they experienced "significant losses due to rain and the Great Recession of 2009".

Unlike its previous role as a secondary producer, AEG would assume majority control because One Reel was no longer a "financially healthy company". As a result, Chris Porter, "Bumbershoot's music booker of nearly two decades", said that "this time [One Reel] had to bow down to the way AEG wanted to do things in order to get the deal done". In effect, AEG kept the festival operating while assuming decision-making authority that it had not previously held.

Some local residents were concerned that AEG's involvement would diminish Bumbershoot's cultural significance and its emphasis on showcasing local artists. Drawing a comparison with the New Orleans Jazz & Heritage Festival, a Seattle resident told The Seattle Times that after AEG began producing JazzFest, the significance of the city's history and culture had receded into the background. The resident also said that local artists had been replaced by commercially oriented headliners.

Although there were concerns about Bumbershoot's future, the local AEG team remained committed to the festival and to Seattle. AEG took over in 2015 after nearly $1 million in debt threatened the festival's future. According to Crosscut, local AEG staff believed that the festival should be saved "and not because it represented a potential chance to make money".

After signing the contract with AEG, One Reel founder Norm Langill met with Chad Queirolo and Rob Thomas of AEG's Pacific Northwest division. Langill told The Seattle Times that he had full confidence in Queirolo and Thomas to take over Bumbershoot's operations.

=== AEG steps down ===
In November 2019, AEG Live announced that they decided not to continue producing Bumbershoot when their contract was up for renewal. AEG's Rob Thomas said the decision was "heartbreaking" as they initially invested in saving the music festival because they believed in it. This decision came after years of problems. Since Seattle maintains ownership of Bumbershoot, related problems arise such as unions, city overtime pay and police fees. The Seattle Center has also been under construction for the last several years which restricts the area available for festival use, most significantly, KeyArena. Industry experts have noted that "it was likely that AEG lost upwards of a million dollars each year it promoted Bumbershoot".

In many festival-hosting cities, government funding – such as grants – have been organized as to continue the festival and maintain profits from tourism and tax gains. Bumbershoot has not experienced such economic profitability, and thus AEG chose to step down.

In the fall of 2019 it was announced that AEG Live "declined to renew its option to produce Bumbershoot in 2020" following its five-year run as lead producer. The 2020 and 2021 editions were cancelled due to the COVID-19 pandemic. The 2022 edition was cancelled to allow new operator New Rising Sun to revamp the festival in time for the golden anniversary in 2023.

=== Third Stone and New Rising Sun ===
In 2023, Third Stone and New Rising Sun announced that they would be re-launching Bumbershoot. New Rising Sun (NRS), a team of concert promoters and visual arts producers, obtained rights to produce Bumbershoot in partnership with Seattle Center.

In March 2023, it was announced that the musical lineup for Bumbershoot 2023 would include Sleater-Kinney, Brittany Howard, Band of Horses, Zhu, Jawbreaker, AFI, the Descendents and Sunny Day Real Estate, among others.

This new iteration of Bumbershoot has faced criticism for high ticket price increases for the formerly-free public festival. Following backlash in 2025 over large price increases, including a 78% increase for single-day tickets, New Rising Sun adjusted prices to be somewhat closer to the previous rates. Prices for the 2026 festival start at $91 for a single-day pass or $156 for a two-day pass.

== See also ==
- List of historic rock festivals
- Capitol Hill Block Party
- Sasquatch! Music Festival
