= Josh Brown (American football) =

American football player (born 1979)

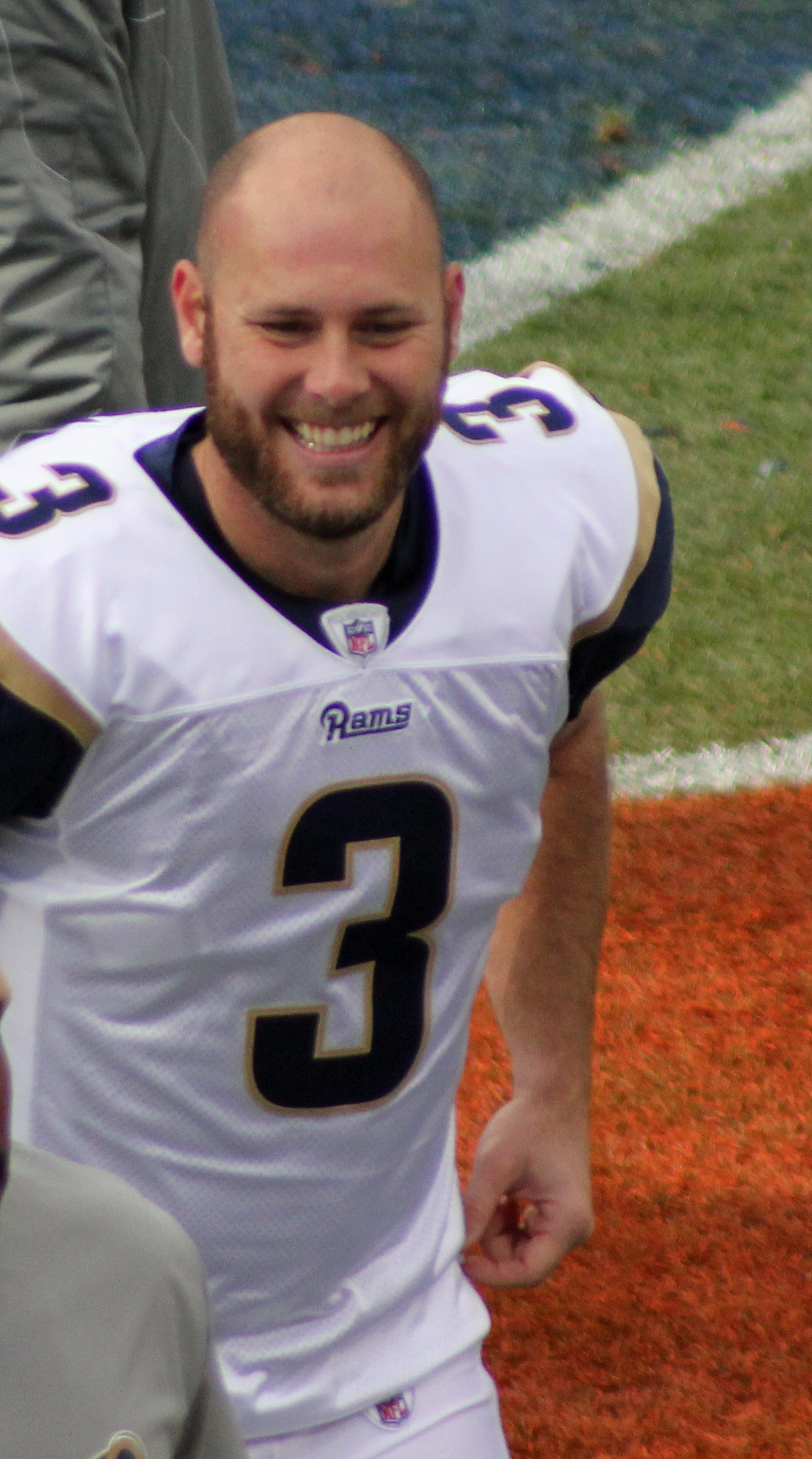
- Brown with the St. Louis Rams in 2010

No. 3
- Position: Placekicker

Personal information
- Born: April 29, 1979 (age 47); Tulsa, Oklahoma, U.S.
- Listed height: 6 ft 0 in (1.83 m)
- Listed weight: 202 lb (92 kg)

Career information
- High school: Foyil (OK)
- College: Nebraska
- NFL draft: 2003: 7th round, 222nd overall pick

Career history
- Seattle Seahawks (2003–2007); St. Louis Rams (2008–2011); New York Jets (2012)*; Cincinnati Bengals (2012); New York Giants (2013–2016)
- * Offseason or practice squad member only

Awards and highlights
- Pro Bowl (2015); PFWA All-Rookie Team (2003); First-team All-Big 12 (2002)

Career NFL statistics
- Field goals: 319/380
- Field goal %: 83.9
- Longest field goal: 58
- Stats at Pro Football Reference

Joshua Clell Brown (born April 29, 1979) is an American former professional football player who was a placekicker in the National Football League (NFL). He played college football for the University of Nebraska Cornhuskers. Brown was selected by the Seattle Seahawks in the seventh round of the 2003 NFL draft. He also played for the St. Louis Rams, Cincinnati Bengals and New York Giants.

Brown was released by the Giants in 2016, after it was made public that he had admitted to an abusive relationship with his wife.

== Early life ==
Brown was born in Tulsa, Oklahoma. He began his football career after his family moved from Tulsa when he was in eighth-grade and he subsequently attended Foyil High School.

== Professional career ==
=== Seattle Seahawks ===
Brown was selected by the Seattle Seahawks with the 222nd overall pick in the 2003 NFL draft. On October 5, 2003, In a game against the Green Bay Packers, Brown kicked a 58-yard field goal, the longest of his career. On January 4, 2004, Brown made his postseason debut against the Green Bay Packers and kicked two field goals as well as all three PATs. On October 10, 2004, after an injury to Tom Rouen, Brown punted for the first time in his career, a 35-yarder, against the St. Louis Rams. On October 17, 2004, Brown kicked a career-high four field goals (33, 40, 28 and 31 yards) against the New England Patriots. On October 23, 2005, while playing against the Dallas Cowboys he made two field goals over 50-yards: a 55-yarder and a 50-yarder as time expired to win the game.

On October 15, 2006, he kicked a 54-yard game-winning field goal while time ran out against the St. Louis Rams to win the game 30–28. Although it would have been a 49-yard kick, Seattle was called for an illegal formation penalty. Unlike a false start penalty there was no 10-second run-off so Brown still had a chance to kick, albeit from 54-yards out. On November 27, 2006, he tied his career best by kicking four field goals in a snowy Monday Night Football game against the Green Bay Packers, with all four field goals made in the first half. On December 3, 2006, Brown kicked a 51-yard field goal to win the game against the Denver Broncos, making it his fourth game winning kick in the last minute in the 2006 season.

On February 22, 2007, the Seattle Seahawks used their franchise tag on Brown. On November 18, 2007, Brown made highlights by tackling and nearly stripping the ball from Pro Bowl kick returner Devin Hester of the Chicago Bears during a third-quarter kickoff. On January 5, 2008, Brown kicked a 50-yard career-high postseason field goal in the NFC Wild Card Game against the Washington Redskins.

=== St. Louis Rams ===
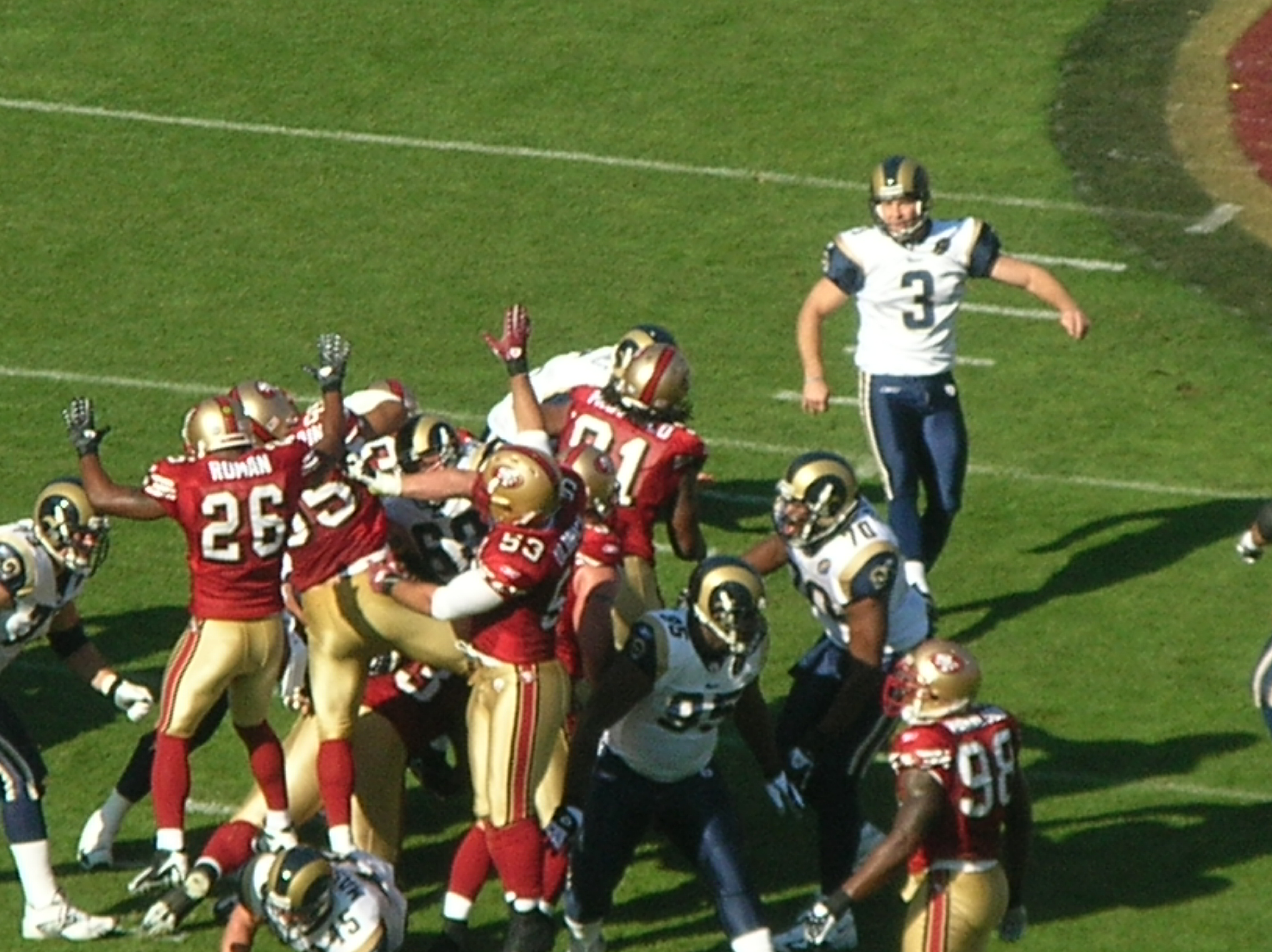
Brown kicks a field goal during a game against the San Francisco 49ers on November 16, 2008.

On February 29, 2008, Brown signed with the St. Louis Rams who made him the NFL's highest paid kicker at the time. The Seattle Seahawks had offered him comparable money, but with an extra year and back loaded the whole deal. This would have made him the highest paid kicker, but he took offense to the fact that the Seahawks' contract was something Brown got offered after visiting the Rams. In an interview on Seattle sports radio station KJR 950 he stated that he had not wanted to be a "slave to the businessman," a statement that was ridiculed by Seattle media and fans.

On October 12, 2008, Brown kicked four field goals, including the game-winning 49-yarder as time expired against Washington Redskins. On November 1, 2009, Brown threw a 36-yard touchdown pass to tight end Daniel Fells with 54 seconds remaining in the first half against the Detroit Lions. On August 13, 2011, Brown made a 60-yard field goal in a preseason game against the Indianapolis Colts. Had it been a regular season game, it would have recorded as a career long, but in preseason games stats are not recorded. The Rams cut him in April 2012 in preparation for drafting Greg Zuerlein in the 2012 NFL draft. He was in the final year of his $14.2 million five-year deal with the Rams.

=== New York Jets ===
Brown was signed by the New York Jets on May 1, 2012, to compete with incumbent Nick Folk. Brown was released by the team on August 27, 2012.

=== Cincinnati Bengals ===
Brown was signed by the Cincinnati Bengals on December 6, 2012, due to an injury to Mike Nugent. Brown beat out Neil Rackers and Billy Cundiff for the job. On December 23, 2012, he kicked the game-winning field goal against the Pittsburgh Steelers to send the Bengals to their first back-to-back playoff berths since the 1981–1982 seasons.

=== New York Giants ===
Brown signed with the New York Giants on March 13, 2013. In his first season, he went 23-of-26 in field goals and 31-of-31 in extra points. On December 22, 2013, Brown kicked a game-winning 45-yarder in overtime against the Detroit Lions. On October 27, 2013, he kicked a career-high five field goals against the Philadelphia Eagles.

In 2014 Brown signed a two-year, $2.6 million contract with the Giants. In his second season with the team, Brown went 24-of-26 in field goals and converted all 44 of his extra points. On December 6, 2015, he missed the game-winning field goal against the New York Jets in overtime. In 2015, Brown was 27-of-29 in field goals and 41-of-42 in extra points. Brown was selected to the 2016 Pro Bowl in his 13th NFL season after Stephen Gostkowski declined to participate.

After the 2015 season, Brown became a free agent. On April 18, 2016, it was announced that he re-signed with the Giants. Brown reportedly received a two-year, $4 million deal. On August 17, 2016, he was suspended one game by the NFL for violating the league's conduct policy. He released a statement saying "while I do not agree with the suspension, I will accept it. I have exhausted the appeals process and have no other options along those lines." The next day, he confirmed that the suspension stemmed from a domestic violence charge in 2015.

On October 20, 2016, the King County, Washington Sheriff's Office released documents related to a domestic violence case against Brown. In those documents, he admitted to verbally and physically abusing his then-wife, Molly. Giants co-owner John Mara told WFAN in New York City that he re-signed Brown even after he admitted to abusing her in the past. In the face of a firestorm of criticism, the Giants deactivated Brown for their Week 7 game against the Los Angeles Rams in London, and planned to revisit his status after the game.

The next day, in the face of further criticism, the NFL placed Brown on the commissioner's exempt list while it reviewed the documents, saying that they appeared to reference "other instances of abuse" separate from the one for which he was disciplined. Brown had the right to appeal this decision, but ESPN's Adam Schefter reported that he would not do so.

The NFL claimed that it made multiple attempts to obtain documents related to the case, only to be rebuffed by the sheriff's office. In response, King County Sheriff John Urquhart told KIRO-AM in Seattle that he'd received a letter from an investigator asking for details on the case, but he never disclosed that he was working for the NFL. For that reason, he dismissed the letter as coming from a "yokel." He also claimed that any requests for information on the case would have gone directly to him had the league followed the normal channels, and "we probably would have told them orally a little bit more about what we had" at the time. The NFL, Urquhart said, behaved like a "bully" when it asked for the information in the manner that it did.

On October 25, 2016, the Giants released Brown. In a statement, the Giants apologized for their previous "misguided" approach to the situation. This move had been expected since the NFL placed him on the exempt list. That day, several sources close to the situation told ESPN's Chris Mortensen that Brown would never play for the Giants again, and that they planned to cut ties with him at the earliest opportunity.

On September 8, 2017, while a free agent, Brown was suspended an additional six games after the NFL continued conducting a previous investigation regarding his previous domestic violence case. Though the suspension was completed without Brown being on a team, it was believed to be the end of his career as teams were unlikely to take on the negative attention that would come with signing him.

== NFL career statistics ==
Year	Team	GP	Field goals				Extra points			Points
Year	Team	GP	FGA	FGM	Pct	Lng	XPA	XPM	Pct	Points
2003	SEA	16	30	22	73.3	58	48	48	100.0	114
2004	SEA	16	25	23	92.0	54	40	40	100.0	109
2005	SEA	16	25	18	72.0	55	57	56	98.2	110
2006	SEA	16	31	25	80.6	54	36	36	100.0	111
2007	SEA	16	34	28	82.4	54	43	43	100.0	127
2008	STL	16	36	31	86.1	54	19	19	100.0	112
2009	STL	16	24	19	79.2	55	16	16	100.0	73
2010	STL	16	39	33	84.6	53	27	26	96.3	125
2011	STL	16	28	21	75.0	49	18	18	100.0	81
2012	CIN	4	12	11	91.7	52	8	8	100.0	41
2013	NYG	16	26	23	88.5	52	31	31	100.0	100
2014	NYG	16	26	24	92.3	53	44	44	100.0	116
2015	NYG	16	32	30	93.8	53	45	44	97.8	134
2016	NYG	5	12	11	91.7	48	9	9	100.0	42
Career		201	380	319	83.9	58	441	438	99.3	1,395

== Personal life ==
=== Media ===
Brown participated in the skit "Field Goal" in the 2010 movie Jackass 3D, where he kicked a football in the face of crew member Preston Lacy.

=== Legal problems ===
Brown was arrested on a fourth-degree domestic violence charge on May 22, 2015, in Woodinville, Washington. According to the police report, the victim alleged that Brown grabbed her wrist while she was picking up a phone. The victim dialed 911 and alleged an assault. The police report states the victim's wrist had "redness" "and a small cut, possibly from a fingernail." On May 27, 2015, five days after the arrest, the charges were dropped by a prosecutor, according to a Washington state district court. Including the May 22 incident, at least eight physical assaults were reported to the police and twenty more were detailed with the King County Sheriff's Office.

According to documents released by King County Sheriff's Office related to his 2015 domestic charge, Brown admitted to abusing his ex-wife. These documents were first obtained by NJ Advance Media. Some of the documents contained therapy journal entries that Brown wrote; one of the entries included Brown saying, "I have abused my wife." In an email, Brown wrote, "I objectified women and never really worried about the pain and hurt I caused them." The documents also contained a "Contract for Change" signed by Brown, his ex-wife, and counselor Jerry Price; this contract states that Brown had physically, verbally, and emotionally abused his ex-wife. Brown also admitted in the documents that he was molested as a young boy.
