= King County 4x4 Search and Rescue =

Volunteer organization in King County, WA

KC4x4SAR Logo

King County 4x4 Search and Rescue (KC4x4SAR) is based out of King County, Washington, USA (Greater Seattle Area). KC4x4SAR is a 100% volunteer organization with no paid positions or staff. The organization has an IRS 501(c)(3) determination and are funded entirely by donations from the public.

As a member organization of the King County Search and Rescue Association (KCSARA), 4x4 works with the other KCSARA member units under the direction of the King County Sheriff’s Office to conduct missions of health and safety throughout King County (and sometimes beyond).

== History ==
4×4 Search and Rescue has been active in King County since 1964. A group of men saw a need to assist others in looking for lost or injured hikers and outdoors enthusiasts that were up logging roads in the mountains or otherwise “away from civilization.” They approached the King County Police with this idea and as a result, 4X4 became a reality. Incorporated as 4x4 Rescue Council, Inc., the organization adopted a dba of King County 4x4 Search & Rescue to better describe the organization's operational role.

== What 4x4 Does ==
4×4 is tasked with general support requiring transport and extended travel Search and Rescue operations.

4X4 team members have skill sets in the following areas:

- Transportation of people, equipment and supplies during missions.
- Land navigation, knowledge of the county topography and various map formats, including computerized mapping systems and Global Positioning System (GPS). Mapping of roads and terrain.
- Base camp procedures, support, logistics, control and security.
- Driving skills to include vehicle recovery techniques, towing, driving under all road and weather conditions, vehicle maintenance and safety.
- Provide and operate an auxiliary Command and Control Vehicle for the Sheriff’s Office.
- Helibase and Helispot (Landing Zone) (helicopter) set-up, control and safety.
- Search strategies to include the fundamentals in road searching, urban searching, grid searching, crime scene and basic principles of other KCSARA unit search techniques.
- Mission site support includes road searches, containment, road-blocking, traffic control/direction and dog/search team escort. Interviews to collect information and be able to interview witnesses.
- 4X4 has a strong contingent of HAM Radio operators that provide additional radio-related services where the KCSO needs the assistance of trained volunteers.
- Many vehicles are equipped with VHF-Lo, VHF-Hi and UHF radio equipment allowing communications with other units or agencies, better facilitating radio operations. Unit members can conveniently set up radio relay locations on high ground in support of search teams that are beyond direct radio communication to base camp.
