= Mitzi Johanknecht =

American police officer

34th King County Sheriff
- In office January 2, 2018 – January 1, 2022
- Preceded by: John Urquhart
- Succeeded by: Patti Cole-Tindall

Personal details
- Born: 1959 (age 66–67) Seattle, Washington, U.S.
- Spouse: Maureen Warren
- Children: 1
- Education: University of Washington; Western Washington University
- Occupation: Law enforcement officer

Mitzi G. Johanknecht (born 1959) is an American police officer who served as the sheriff of King County, Washington from 2018 to 2022. Prior to her election in 2017, she served for 32 years at the King County Sheriff's Office, holding the rank of major.

== Early life and education ==
Johanknecht was born in Seattle and raised in Burien, Washington, as the third of five children. She graduated from Bainbridge Island High School and played collegiate basketball at the University of Washington and Western Washington University; she initially attended college with the intent of majoring in education.

== Career ==
Johanknecht joined the King County Sheriff's Office in 1985. She spent her early years at an experimental police substation at a low-income apartment complex in Kent, assisting in undercover investigations and serving as a community liaison. Johanknecht, promoted to the rank of sergeant, served as the second-in-command at the Shoreline precinct until 1997. She was transferred to the Kenmore precinct and demoted after making comments on behalf of a city council candidate that were deemed inappropriate for a high-ranking officer. The transfer prompted a protest by her supporters outside Shoreline's city hall, where she practiced community policing and was well liked. She was made captain in 1998 and later became the first female deputy to lead the office's SWAT team. In 2013, she was assigned to command the Criminal Investigations Division and the Southwest Precinct in Burien.

=== 2017 election ===
Johanknecht announced her candidacy for Sheriff in May 2017, looking to unseat incumbent John Urquhart after a tenure marked by allegations of bias, harassment, and sexual assault. Johanknecht, backed by former County Executive Ron Sims and U.S. Representative Pramila Jayapal, faced Urquhart in a "bitterly contested" race for the office. Urquhart allegedly directed his staff to confront and intimidate Johanknecht and her supporters, namely captains in the department and the police union, prior to the announcement of her candidacy.

Johanknecht led in initial returns, with 61 percent of votes, and was declared the winner of the election by major media outlets. Urquhart conceded days later, wishing Johanknecht the best of luck and lamenting that "reformers only last one term". In the final vote count, Johanknecht led with nearly 57 percent of votes. Following the election, Johanknecht said that Urquhart had refused to contact her, and she instead sought advice about the transition from former sheriff Sue Rahr and the sheriffs of Pierce and Snohomish counties.

=== Tenure as sheriff ===
Johanknecht took office on January 2, 2018, taking Captain Scott Somers from the Burien precinct as chief deputy sheriff and promoting officers from other precincts to new positions. She advocated for the creation of a new gang task force in response to a fatal shooting in Burien in September 2018.

Following the 2020 George Floyd protests, the Metropolitan King County Council approved reforms to the Sheriff's Office that would limit its autonomy and scope. Among the changes was to make the sheriff an appointed position, which Johanknecht lobbied against. The reforms were approved by voters in the November 2020 election and would take effect at the end of Johanknecht's term in December 2021. The county council also approved $4.6 million in cuts to the sheriff's budget proposed by county executive Dow Constantine, redirecting funds raised from marijuana taxes to vacate marijuana convictions.

In March 2021, the Sheriff's Office announced a settlement with the family of Tommy Le, a 20-year-old who had been fatally shot by a deputy. Following the leak of an internal email from Johanknecht where she wrote that "this case is not a reflection of how I view the actions", several county councilmembers and Constantine called for her resignation. The Sheriff's Office had also been accused of not adequately addressing racial problems under her tenure. Johanknecht remained in her position until the end of her term on January 1, 2022, and was replaced by Patti Cole-Tindall.

== Personal life ==
Johanknecht is lesbian and lives with her wife Maureen in West Seattle. They have an adult daughter who lives in New York. Johanknecht is an associate member of the production team for the Seattle Men's Chorus and Seattle Women's Chorus and serves on the board of the non-profit network Companis.
