= Steve Strachan =

Steve Strachan may refer to:

- Steve Strachan (sheriff) (born 1965), American law enforcement officer and politician
- Steve Strachan (American football) (born 1963), American football running back
