= Regina Rush-Kittle =

American police officer, soldier, and public administrator

- Born: Regina Rush; January 2, 1961 (age 65); Baltimore, Maryland, US
- Education: University of Connecticut (BA); Western New England College (MS); University of New Haven (Honorary Doctorate)
- Occupations: Law enforcement Military service Public administration
- Employer(s): Connecticut State Police; US Army Reserve
- Known for: Trailblazer for African American women in law enforcement
- Awards: Bronze Star Medal; Presidential Lifetime Achievement Award

Regina Rush-Kittle (born January 2, 1961) is an American law enforcement officer, soldier, and public administrator. She has held trailblazing leadership roles in the Connecticut State Police, the US Army Reserve, and the Connecticut State Division of Emergency Management and Homeland Security. She was inducted into the Connecticut Women's Hall of Fame in 2017 and to the Connecticut Veterans Hall of Fame in 2022. During the Biden/Harris administration, she was awarded The Presidential Lifetime Achievement Award.

== Early life and education ==
Rush-Kittle was born in Baltimore on January 2, 1961, and moved with her family to Middletown, Connecticut, in 1968. She graduated Middletown High School in 1979 and received a Bachelor of Arts degree in political science from the University of Connecticut in 1983. At UConn, Rush-Kittle became a member of Alpha Kappa Alpha, one of the "Divine Nine" historically black sororities. As a junior in college, she enlisted in the US Marine Corps Reserve, serving for three years.

== Law enforcement career ==
Post-college, Rush-Kittle worked as a corrections officer at the York Correctional Institution for two years and joined the Middletown Police Department as its first African American female patrol officer in 1985. She attended the state police academy in 1987 and joined the state police. She rose through the ranks to become the first African American woman to serve as sergeant (1996), lieutenant (2004), or major (2011) in the Connecticut State Police. She was also first woman to command a Connecticut State Police barracks (2004) and the first woman to serve as commandant of the Connecticut State Police Training Academy (2011). She commanded the Bureau of Professional Standards and Compliance and in April 2015 was named commandant of the central district headquarters, one of three statewide. She retired in August 2015 after 30 years of state service. She went on to serve as second-in-command of the police department in Millbury, Massachusetts, until February 2017.

She earned a master's degree in criminal justice administration from Western New England College in 1997 and graduated from the FBI National Academy in 2011. In 2019, she received an honorary doctorate in criminal justice from the University of New Haven, where she delivered the keynote address at commencement.

She is a past president of the National Association of Black Law Enforcement Officers.

== Military career ==
After serving three years in the Marine Corps Reserve, Rush-Kittle transferred to the US Army Reserves in 1985 and became a drill sergeant. Given her law enforcement career, she sought to enlist in the Military Police Corps but was rejected because at 5'2, she failed the height requirement by two inches.

She deployed to Kuwait for one year in 2003 in support of Operation Iraqi Freedom. Her unit handled logistics, distributing medical supplies and equipment. In 2009, she served a yearlong deployment to Afghanistan as a part of an all-female command team and received the Bronze Star Medal.

From May 2009 to August 2010, Rush-Kittle served as Command Sergeant Major (the US Army's highest enlisted rank) of the 321st Military Intelligence Battalion, then based in Texas. She retired from the military in March 2012 after completing 30 years of military service.

== Public administration ==
From January 2019 to December 2021, Rush-Kittle served as deputy commissioner of the Connecticut Division of Emergency Management and Homeland Security, part of the Connecticut Department of Emergency Services and Public Protection. She was appointed to the office by Governor Ned Lamont. In November 2021, Mayor Justin Elicker appointed Rush-Kittle to be chief administrative officer of New Haven, Connecticut, overseeing two-thirds of the city's public employees.

== Personal life ==
She married William Kittle in 1997. They met while both were serving in the Army. Kittle began his first day of state police academy training on the day of their wedding. He is now a retired Connecticut State Police master sergeant and retired Connecticut Army National Guard first sergeant. The couple has two adult children, Jorrell and Gianna.
