= Katie Wilson =

Mayor of Seattle since 2026

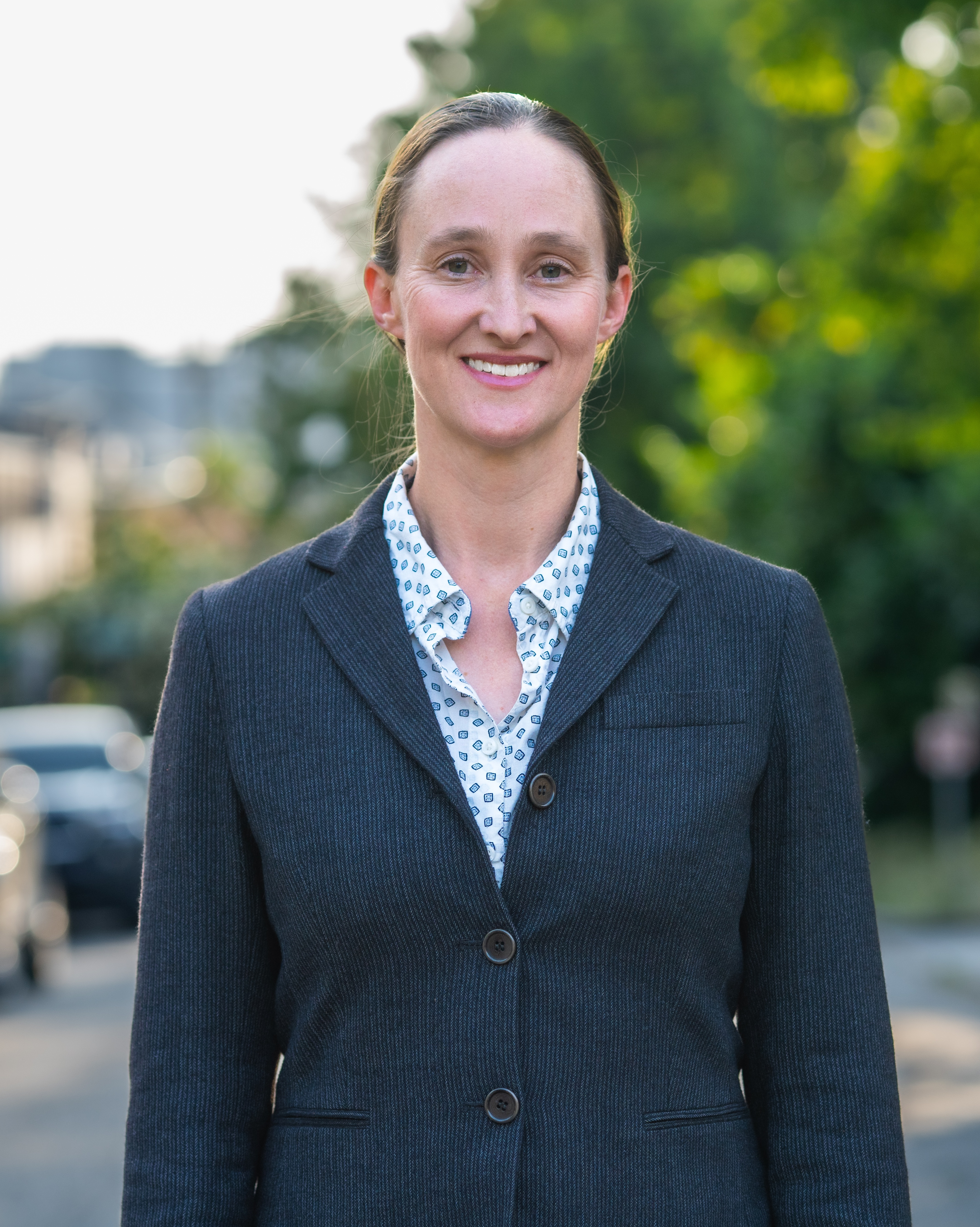
- Wilson in 2025

58th Mayor of Seattle
- Incumbent
- Assumed office January 1, 2026
- Deputy: Brian Surratt
- Preceded by: Bruce Harrell

Personal details
- Born: Katherine Barrett Wilson; July 12, 1982 (age 44) Binghamton, New York, U.S.
- Party: Democratic
- Spouse: Scott Myers (m. 2004)
- Children: 1
- Relatives: David Sloan Wilson (father); Sloan Wilson (grandfather)
- Education: Balliol College, Oxford (dropped out)
- Website: Campaign website

Katherine Barrett Wilson (born July 12, 1982) is an American politician and activist serving as the 58th mayor of Seattle since 2026. She is the co-founder and executive director of the Transit Riders Union, a group that focuses on improving public transportation and workers' rights.

Wilson, a democratic socialist, was elected mayor of Seattle in 2025, narrowly defeating incumbent mayor Bruce Harrell.

== Early life and activism ==
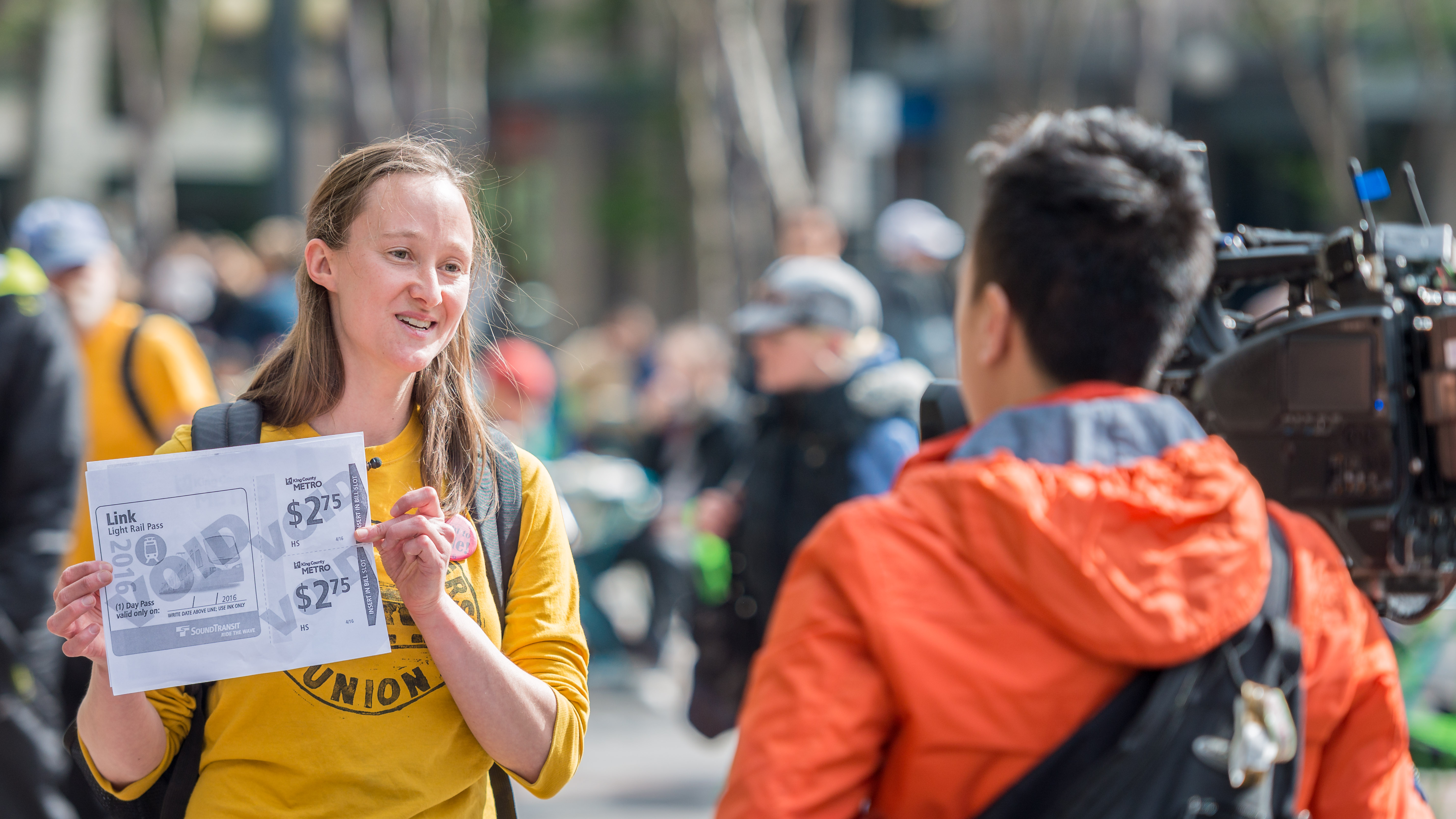
Wilson speaking at a Right to Ride rally at Westlake Park, 2016

Wilson was raised in Binghamton, New York, by her parents, Anne Barrett Clark and David Sloan Wilson, both evolutionary biologists. She graduated in 2000 as salutatorian from Binghamton High School before studying physics and philosophy at Balliol College of Oxford in England. She withdrew from Oxford six weeks before she was scheduled to sit for the examinations in the final honours school for her degree and moved to Seattle in 2004. She worked several jobs after moving, including working in boat repair, construction, and as an office assistant.

In fall 2011, Wilson co-founded the Seattle Transit Riders Union (TRU), a nonprofit 501(c)(4) focused on improving public transportation in Seattle and King County, where she has been a paid, full-time employee since 2019. Tax records show she earned almost $73,000 from the nonprofit in 2022. She also served as Executive Director and the group’s board president, an unpaid position. The TRU is an organization that campaigns and lobbies for progressive causes.

The organization was formed after a proposed 17% cut to King County Metro and an elimination of the fare-free zone in downtown. In 2014, Wilson and the TRU successfully lobbied King County for the creation of the ORCA Lift program, which provided reduced fares for low-income individuals. The TRU previously campaigned for increases to the minimum wage in Burien, SeaTac and Tukwila, as well as greater renters' rights, and better public transport.

In 2020, Wilson played a role in the creation of Seattle's JumpStart tax, a payroll tax on private employers to fund affordable housing. She was critical of Mayor Bruce Harrell for proposing redirecting JumpStart funds to balance the city budget instead of affordable housing projects. Wilson was also a member of Harrell's Seattle Revenue Stabilization Workgroup, which explored and recommended additional progressive revenue to address the city's budget deficit. For several years, Wilson was also a member of the board of the Economic Opportunity Institute.

Wilson has written policy columns for Cascade PBS and The Stranger, and The Urbanist.

== Mayor of Seattle ==
=== 2025 campaign ===
In March 2025, Wilson announced a campaign to challenge incumbent Bruce Harrell for mayor of Seattle. She cited Harrell's opposition to a February 2025 ballot measure that would fund housing through taxes on businesses as a factor in her decision to run. Wilson, running as a progressive, stated her top three priorities as mayor are housing, homelessness, and protecting Seattle from federal actions. In the primary, she was endorsed by every Democratic party organization in the city, including all six legislative district Democrats, The Stranger, and PROTEC17, a union that represents 3,000 city workers.

In the weeks leading to the primary, polls indicated a close race between Wilson and Harrell, with both raising nearly $500,000. In the August nonpartisan primary, Wilson placed first among a field of eight candidates, with 50.9% of the vote, and advanced to the general election with Harrell who earned 41.3%.

Wilson's campaign was likened to the campaign of Zohran Mamdani in the 2025 New York City mayoral election by several publications, including The Nation and The Stranger. According to The Nation, Wilson created a winning electoral coalition from the precariat of Seattle renters, Sound transit riders, and Democratic Socialists of America members. Fox News credited Wilson's electoral success to her ability to appeal to progressive voters by advocating for city-run grocery stores, taxing the rich, and "Trump-proofing" the city. On the campaign trail, Wilson argued Harrell did not properly address homelessness during his tenure as mayor, and failed to lower the cost of living. Harrell emphasized his administration's efforts on public safety, transportation, and housing affordability, while noting Wilson's previous support for the "Defund the police" movement. During the campaign Wilson did not call for defunding the police, instead arguing that armed officers are not needed to respond to mental health and other non-crime calls that should be handled by other kinds of professionals.

Wilson won by a margin of 0.73 percentage points in the November 4, 2025 general election, the closest mayoral election in Seattle by percentage points since 1906.

=== Tenure ===
Wilson's term began on January 1, 2026. She was ceremonially sworn into office on January 2, 2026, with local transit union leader Pauline Van Senus administering the oath of office.

==== Immigrant community advocacy ====
Since taking office, Wilson has publicly supported Seattle's Somali community and opposed Republican-led oversight committees investigating fraud allegations linked to the Somali immigrant community of Minnesota. Wilson has publicly supported local Seattle immigrant communities and activist networks that oppose ICE arrests in the city.

==== Artificial intelligence policy ====
In March 2026, Wilson stopped a citywide rollout of the Microsoft Copilot AI chatbot for city employees that had begun under her predecessor. The 500 employees who were already using it were allowed to continue. In May 2026, Wilson lifted the restriction of Microsoft Copilot for day-to-day tasks, but blocked publicly available AI tools, like ChatGPT.

==== Starbucks boycott comments ====
Shortly after being elected mayor, Wilson joined the Starbucks Workers United picket line outside a Starbucks Reserve in the Capitol Hill neighborhood as part of a larger strike by unionized Starbucks workers around America amid stalled contract negotiations. At the event, Wilson urged Seattleites to boycott the chain, declaring, "I am not buying Starbucks and you shouldn't either," and led a chant in support of striking workers.

In May 2026, Wilson told The New York Times that her earlier comments had been counterproductive, and that she wanted to maintain a "multidimensional relationship" with companies like Starbucks. Wilson later told the South Seattle Emerald that she would continue to support unionization efforts, describing Seattle as a 'union town'; however, she noted that she planned to maintain positive relationships with major corporations such as Starbucks, citing the company's million-dollar contribution to the city's 'Shelter Acceleration' program.

==== Homelessness policy ====
In June 2026, the first batch of single-adult home units, colloquially known as "tiny homes", finished construction in the city's Interbay neighborhood. This community of 75 tiny homes is officially designated as the Bayside Shelter, and currently provides 24/7 transitional housing for homeless individuals living on the streets. In addition to shelter, occupants also have access to behavioral health support. The Bayside Shelter project cost $3.95 million.

Wilson initially announced plans to construct 1,000 tiny homes throughout the city before the end of 2026. Wilson did not meet her previous goal of building 500 tiny homes before the start of the 2026 FIFA World Cup. During her campaign, Wilson pledged to expand tiny home capacity ahead of the World Cup, later characterizing the timeline as ambitious.

Citing logistical challenges and budget constraints, Wilson scaled down her efforts to build 1,000 new tiny homes for every year of her term; instead, proposing a plan to build 960 in a 2-year period. Addressing the discrepancy between her campaign pledge regarding the number of shelters and subsequent policy outcomes, Wilson remarked in an interview, "The point of putting that big number out there is we need to talk about the scale of the crisis... Numbers catch people’s attention and they force us to deal seriously with the issue." According to the mayor's office, this new initiative will cost $75 million.

Earlier in the year, Jon Grant resigned as Wilson's senior advisor on homelessness policy.

==== Crime reduction initiatives ====
In an effort to combat open-air drug markets and crime in the city's Little Saigon and the North Beacon Hill neighborhoods, Wilson increased police presence in the area and committed additional city resources to tackle the issue. This included booking individuals caught selling drugs into jail and enrolling them in the city's L.E.A.D. diversion program. As of June 2026, Seattle plans to spend $1.1 million on additional neighborhood services, including outreach staff and mobile overdose treatment and prevention teams, along with additional training for police officers. In a statement to KING-TV, Wilson said, "we must disrupt the drug dealing, public disorder, and other illegal activity that has destabilized this community."

Wilson also expressed desire for a citywide shift to a neighborhood policing model, one that could help build collaborative relationships between the police and community members.

In response to sex trafficking and gun violence, residents marched down Aurora Avenue, demanding more police intervention. Residents also installed makeshift road barriers to close residential side streets. Wilson stated residents sent a clear message, saying, "the status quo was not working" when they acted independently. The city removed the resident-made barriers and installed temporary traffic calming devices on 4 streets along Aurora Ave.

==== Seattle's budget deficit ====
Upon taking office, Wilson inherited a steep budget shortfall. By June 2026, the city of Seattle had a budget deficit of around $175 million, or about 10% of the overall budget. As a potential solution, Wilson proposed implementing a city-wide capital gains tax, in addition to the state's existing capital gains tax. When asked by Fox 13 Seattle whether or not she would expand the existing payroll tax, a tax that Wilson herself had supported, Wilson responded by saying, "Nothing is off the table."

In September 2026, Wilson announced a $9.1 billion dollar budget proposal for the 2027 and 2028 fiscal years. The proposed budget includes a $50 million dollar reduction in general revenue fund spending, the elimination of 15 currently filled full-time city positions, a $68 million dollar net increase to the Seattle Police Department budget, and $183 million dollars allocated to addressing homelessness. Wilson claims her budget proposal can balance the city's budget without raising city taxes. The proposal must be approved by City Council before it can be implemented.

==== Surveillance and privacy policy ====
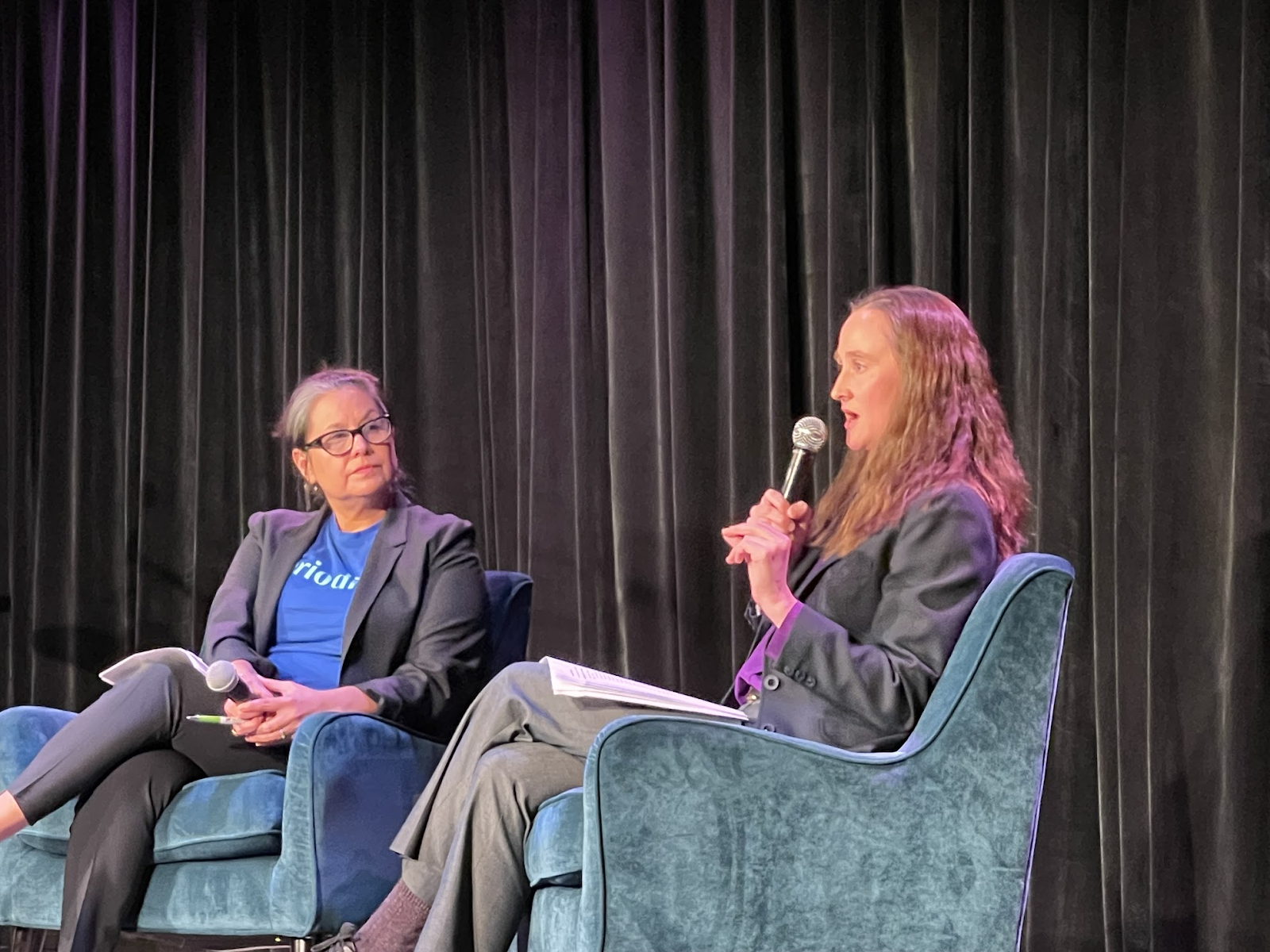
Katie Wilson at a Surveillance town hall meeting in March 2026

In March 2026, Wilson announced that she would pause the expansion of the city's CCTV network, which included installing cameras near Garfield High School and around Capitol Hill, while installing, but not turning on, the cameras in the Stadium district around Lumen Field and T-Mobile Park. This expansion will remain paused until an independent audit of the city's surveillance system has been completed. Wilson, in her decision, expressed concern that the cameras could be used by the federal government to enforce immigration law or carry out abortion-related investigations. She also turned off a camera that faced a clinic that provided reproductive and gender affirming care.

In late March 2026, Wilson held a town hall meeting that focused on her decision to turn off some, but not all, of the surveillance cameras. Most people in attendance, which included former Wilson campaign staffers expressed concerns over privacy and federal access to footage. During the town hall, Wilson said, "I don’t feel that I am breaking a campaign promise." Members of the Transit Riders Union, which Wilson cofounded, said that "it may not have been a literal departure from campaign promises, but thematic, yes."

Wilson said that the cameras in the Stadium District would be turned on if there was a credible threat during the 2026 FIFA World Cup, and turned off when the games concluded. In June 2026, Wilson announced that the cameras would be turned on during the World Cup, citing a briefing from SPD and FBI which said there were "general but credible threats." Following the end of the games in Seattle, Wilson ordered the cameras to be deactivated.

In a statement to Fox 13 Seattle in July 2026, Wilson defended her decision, saying, "Public safety is my most fundamental responsibility as the elected leader of this city, and I take that seriously." She continued, "We can keep our city safe and safeguard people’s privacy, and I believe the people of Seattle agree." Supporters of Wilson's decision have expressed concerns about who has access to the footage, how it is being used, and how long it is being retained.

Bob Kettle, a member of the Seattle City Council and chair of its Public Safety Committee, strongly opposed Wilson's decision, emphasizing that the surveillance system does not have facial recognition capabilities and only retains footage for 5 days after it has been recorded. Kettle stated, "The images on the CCTV cameras reside for five days, and they sit there, and they’re gone. They're only pulled when they're cued by something like a 911 call."

In early August, following the Seattle Center shooting, several Seattle business leaders signed an open letter to the mayor, urging her to reactivate the CCTV cameras in the Stadium District and expand the network. Wilson responded to the letter in an official statement, "Different people and different communities experience the cameras differently ... it's important to base a decision on more than feelings." Wilson emphasized that the cameras would remain deactivated until an independent audit concluded in September.

After the independent audit concluded, Wilson announced the city would continue with the expansion of SPD's surveillance program, and stated that after reviewing the report, she believed there was an "important and responsible role for the RTCC within Seattle's public-safety system." Cameras in the Stadium District were turned back on, and new cameras were set to be installed in the Central District and the nightlife district of Capitol Hill.

The audit stated there were "significant gaps" in governance surrounding the RTCC, described current research around potential benefits of the system as "thin" and broad research on the public safety impacts of CCTV systems as "mixed", and stated that as long as the RTCC retained any data, the risk of illegal usage of the data could not be fully eliminated.

Wilson and SPD agreed to implement recommendations made in the audit, including a public dashboard reporting on usage of the RTCC, clarifying internal policies, implementing internal audits, and developing policies regarding the integration of private cameras into the RTCC, and the impacts and usage of the RTCC during events, protests, and other First-Amendment protected activities.

==== 2026 Washington primary endorsements ====
In June 2026, Wilson endorsed progressives Hannah Sabio-Howell and Ron Davis, who were both challenging moderate incumbents for the Washington State Legislature. Wilson also endorsed Jaelynn Scott, a transgender woman and member of Democratic Socialists of America, who was running for an open seat. The move was seen as a test of Wilson's political influence; however, Sabio-Howell and Davis were both defeated by their respective incumbents in the August primary election. Scott won her primary against a college student, who ran as an independent, winning more than 88% of the vote.

==== Shon Barnes's resignation as police chief ====
On July 26, 2026, at approximately 6:00 p.m., a deadly shootout took place at the annual Bite of Seattle food festival, claiming the lives of three victims and injuring four others. One suspect, an unnamed 15 year-old male, was charged as a juvenile with first-degree assault and second-degree unlawful possession of a firearm. A second 19 year-old suspect died at the scene and at least one other suspect may have been involved also.

In the hours following the shooting, both the mayor's office and the Seattle Police Department drew public criticism for delays in releasing official updates. Wilson had initially announced that two suspects had been taken into custody, a statement she later retracted. The city also did not send out any notifications via its emergency alert system. The public blamed police chief Shon Barnes's absence for contributing to the breakdown in communication, though this causation was not proven. According to Barnes, he had been attending a National Organization of Black Law Enforcement Executives conference in Texas when the shooting happened. Following media speculation that Wilson intended to remove him, Barnes announced his resignation as police chief on July 30. No reason for his resignation was given. Wilson accepted the resignation and appointed Deputy Chief Andre Sayles as interim chief of police.

According to statements made by multiple Seattle city council members, Wilson had asked Barnes to resign the night of July 29. Council members also alleged that Wilson provided conflicting information in the moments leading up to his resignation, which they claimed left them without official confirmation on his employment status.

After hearing word of Barnes's resignation, several Black community organizations spoke out in opposition to the mayor. This coalition of organizations included the NAACP's Seattle branch and the Urban League of Metropolitan Seattle, among others. Leaders of the coalition argued that Barnes was unfairly blamed for the delay in communication following the shooting and should not have been asked to resign. They also criticized city officials for removing the city's top law enforcement official ahead of the Seafair Weekend Festival, one of the busiest times of year for the Seattle Police Department.

Several city council members including Robert Kettle, Alexis Mercedes Rinck, and Rob Saka expressed concern also, citing a lack of transparency regarding the decision to have the city's police chief resign. Kettle, who had supported Barnes, expressed his concerns by saying, "now this creates a crisis in confidence. And that’s troubling because that hurts us in terms of our public safety. It hurts our efforts to go forward." Saka urged the mayor to reconsider her request for the police chief's resignation. Referencing the ongoing investigation into the shooting, Saka questioned the timing of the move, stating, "Making a decision in haste in the middle of crisis is wrong." Council member Maritza Rivera questioned the mayor's rationale, stating Barnes's tenure as police chief was having a positive effect on local crime statistics.

Barnes's resignation as Seattle chief of police marked the fourth leadership change for the position in a 30-month period.

According to the terms of his resignation agreement with the mayor, Barnes was promised a lump sum of $600,000, a $60,000 relocation benefit, and the ability to retain his $50,000 signing bonus. The contract further stipulated that Barnes waive the right to take legal action against the City of Seattle concerning his tenure as chief of police.

During a news conference on July 31, Wilson introduced the new interim police chief and outlined what qualities she would seek in Barnes's permanent replacement. She also confirmed that she had asked Barnes to resign. She stated she would look for someone who could be "consistently present in Seattle, keeping travel to an appropriate minimum," and someone who "ensures that when they are away, there is sufficient SPD leadership in town to guide [Seattle] through any emergency."

When asked why Barnes had resigned, she responded that the reason was a combination of multiple factors, saying, "some of which were related to the events of Sunday, but that certainly wasn't the only thing." When asked by another reporter about her concerns regarding Barnes's performance as police chief, Wilson stated, “I believe the path we are on now is the one that is gonna put us in the best position to achieve our public safety outcomes, and that includes transparent communication with the public...”

In October 2026, the governor's office publicly released text message conversations between Washington governor Bob Ferguson and other high-ranking officials, including the mayor herself and U.S. representative Pramila Jayapal. According to SPD Assistant Chief Tyrone Davis, on the night of July 26, he had been instructed by the mayor's second-in-command, Brian Surratt, to delay the press conference until the mayor herself arrived. Davis alleged that SPD was ready to brief the public about the shooting at 7:30 p.m., but was told by the mayor's office to hold off until after the mayor arrived at the scene. The press conference began at 11:00 p.m. that night.

==== Ban on grocery store surveillance pricing ====
In October 2026, Wilson signed a bill into law banning large grocers in the City of Seattle from participating in "surveillance pricing". The bill prohibits grocers and food delivery services from using personal data — including race, gender, age, and internet search history — to charge shoppers different prices for the same product. Chains with fewer than 20 locations, convenience stores, and farmers markets are exempt from this ban.

== Political views ==
Wilson is a self-described democratic socialist, but is not a member of and was not endorsed by the Democratic Socialists of America (DSA). However, she was endorsed by the University of Washington youth chapter of the DSA.

=== Public transportation ===
Through the Transit Riders Union, Wilson successfully lobbied for the creation of the ORCA Lift program for low-income riders and free ORCA cards for students in Seattle Public Schools. Wilson also proposed fare-free transit in Seattle following the adoption of fare-free policy by Olympia-based Intercity Transit in 2020. She also advocated for subsidies on e-bikes and transit passes for employees, congestion pricing and a parking cash-out law.

Wilson's mayoral campaign platform included support for improvements to accessibility and safety on sidewalks and bicycle lanes in Seattle. Her platform also endorsed a program to pedestrianize and limit car access to Pike Place Market and portions of Capitol Hill.

=== Rent regulations ===
Wilson is a supporter of rent stabilization. She also supported increasing zoning for houses and public housing to tackle high rents, along with banning algorithmic price fixing and "junk fees" in rent costs. Additionally, she supported limiting the purchase of homes by private equity firms.

=== Taxes ===
Wilson has been highly critical of Washington's state tax laws, which she deemed as the "worst" in the United States. Specifically, she notes that the lack of an income tax in Washington forces reliance on other sources of revenue like sales, excise, and property taxes that she claims benefit large companies like Amazon and Microsoft. She also supported progressive tax reform campaigns within Seattle. In 2020, Wilson advocated for the Amazon Tax campaign in Seattle City Council, led by Councilmember Kshama Sawant. She similarly supported the JumpStart Tax, which focused on taxing larger businesses with high-earning employees, including Amazon. The JumpStart Tax was introduced as legislation by Councilmember Teresa Mosqueda, passing with a 7-2 vote.

During her mayoral campaign, Wilson proposed additional taxes to generate revenue for the city, including a tax on landlords that own vacant properties and a capital gains tax.

== Personal life ==
Wilson is married to Scott Myers, an activist whom she met during high school in Binghamton. They rent a one-bedroom apartment in Capitol Hill and have one daughter.

Wilson does not own a car and primarily rides public transit to get around Seattle with her daughter. Wilson has also previously used a bicycle for transportation, although she relies more on transit since having a child. Since becoming mayor of Seattle, she is transported by a security detail.

== Electoral history ==
=== 2025 Seattle mayoral election ===
Nonpartisan primary results
Candidate	Votes	%
Katie Wilson	98,562	50.75
Bruce Harrell (incumbent)	80,043	41.21
Joe Mallahan	8,538	4.40
Ry Armstrong	2,120	1.09
Clinton Bliss	2,046	1.05
Isaiah Willoughby	817	0.42
Joe Molloy	799	0.41
Thaddeus Whelan	716	0.37
Write-in	588	0.30
Total votes	194,229	100.00

General election results
Candidate	Votes	%
Katie Wilson	138,931	50.20
Bruce Harrell (incumbent)	136,920	49.47
Write-in	911	0.33
Total votes	280,375	100.00

Political offices
Preceded by Bruce Harrell	Mayor of Seattle; 2026–present	Incumbent
