= Shon Barnes =

American police chief

Chief of the Seattle Police Department
- In office January 31, 2025 – July 30, 2026
- Mayor: Bruce Harrell; Katie Wilson
- Preceded by: Sue Rahr
- Succeeded by: Andre Sayles (interim)

Personal details
- Born: Shon Fitzgerald Barnes Murfreesboro, North Carolina, U.S.
- Spouse: Stephanie Dance-Barnes
- Children: 3
- Education: Elizabeth City State University (BA); University of Cincinnati (MS); North Carolina A&T State University (PhD)

Shon Fitzgerald Barnes is an American law enforcement officer who served as the chief of the Seattle Police Department from 2025 to 2026. He was the chief of police of Madison, Wisconsin from 2021 to 2025, and the deputy chief of police of Salisbury, North Carolina from 2017 to 2020.

== Early life and education ==
Born in Murfreesboro, North Carolina. Barnes earned a bachelor of arts degree in history and pre-law from Elizabeth City State University, and a master of science in criminal justice from the University of Cincinnati. He also holds a Ph.D. in leadership studies from North Carolina A&T State University. His doctoral research was focused on police-community relations, specifically examining racial disparity and the effects of hot spots policing.

== Career ==
Prior to his career in law enforcement, Barnes was a Marine reservist and a history teacher in North Carolina. After talking to a school resource officer, he decided to become a police officer. In 2000, Barnes became a patrolman in Greensboro, North Carolina, and eventually rose to the rank of Captain. He was assistant chief of the Salisbury, North Carolina Police Department from 2017-2020. Barnes then became the director of training and professional development for Chicago's police oversight group.

In February 2021, Barnes was sworn in as the Chief of the Madison Police Department, after the former chief suddenly resigned 17 months earlier. During his tenure, Barnes advocated the use of body cameras for officers in the department, but many city leaders and community members resisted the expansion. In 2023, Barnes applied to be the Chicago Police Chief, but the position was filled by Larry Snelling. Before the announcement that he would become the Police Chief of Seattle, Barnes oversaw the investigation of the mass shooting at the Abundant Life Christian School.

=== Seattle Police Chief ===
In December 2024, Seattle Mayor Bruce Harrell announced that he appointed Barnes as the next police chief after firing former chief Adrian Diaz earlier that month. Diaz was demoted in May 2024, with former King County Sherrif Sue Rahr becoming interim chief, and later fired after multiple allegations of sexual discrimination and retaliation came out against him.

As interim chief, Barnes faced criticism over SPD's response to nude beachgoers at Denny Blaine Park and for its response to counterprotesters at an evangelical Christian anti-trans, anti-abortion event in Cal Anderson Park. With the Denny Blaine incident, Barnes apoligized to the people who were arrested and confirmed that people were allowed to be nude at the beach. In response to the police response at Cal Anderson Park, he said the police need to take a "less is more" approach and tactical gear should be used minimally.

On July 1, 2025, the Seattle City Council voted 9-0 to confirm Barnes as police chief. In his confirmation hearing, Barnes said that he believes in accountability, and that "I agree that there is a place for a punitive response, under certain circumstances. I also believe that true police accountability begins long before any incidents arise that draw scrutiny from oversight bodies."

==== Resignation ====
On July 26, 2026, a deadly shootout took place at the annual Bite of Seattle food festival, claiming the lives of three victims and injuring four others. One suspect, an unnamed 15-year-old male, was charged as a juvenile with first-degree assault and second-degree unlawful possession of a firearm. A second 19-year-old suspect died at the scene, and at least one other suspect may have been involved also.

In the hours following the shooting, both the mayor's office and the Seattle Police Department drew public criticism for delays in releasing official updates. Wilson had initially announced that two suspects had been taken into custody, a statement she later retracted. The city also did not send out any notifications via its emergency alert system.

The public blamed Barnes' absence for contributing to the breakdown in communication, though this causation was not proven. The day after the shooting at a press conference, Barnes said he had been attending a National Organization of Black Law Enforcement Executives conference in Texas when the shooting happened. Reports indicated that Barnes planned to be out of town until mid-August, which he denied. After the press conference, Barnes confronted a reporter from the South Seattle Emerald who asked when he planned to come back to Seattle originally, and responded, in part, "I don’t have to tell you where I go." Barnes also said that reports that he is out of Seattle "often" were wrong.

The confrontation went viral, and the following day, at a press conference, Barnes said the clip showed that his "passion was on display." Barnes, whose family lives in Chicago, denied reports that he is in Chicago often saying, "I don’t travel as often as I would like to." He also stated that he "respects our media" and that he "understand that your job is to ask tough questions."

On July 29, Barnes set up interviews with media outlets about his out-of-state travel, but they were canceled because he was busy working with the King County Prosecuting Attorney office on the Seattle Center shooting case. SPD did provide a partial calendar, which showed that Barnes was out of town nearly seven weeks, from February to July 2026, and in Chicago 17 of those days. Later that night, sources within City Hall said that Wilson would ask for Barnes' resignation, but the Mayor's office did not confirm the reports that evening.

On July 30, a group of black community leaders and clergy members held a rally in City Hall in support of Barnes and against his ousting. City Councilmembers criticized Wilson over her lack of an official statement if Barnes was out as police chief, with many expressing their support of him. That afternoon, Wilson announced that she accepted Barnes resignation and would appoint Deputy Chief Andre Sayles as Interim Chief.

The following day, Wilson and Sayles held a press conference to provide an update on the Seattle Center shooting and changes in SPD leadership. Wilson did not give a specific reason for Barnes' resignation, saying, "There were multiple factors, some of which were related to the events of Sunday, but that certainly wasn't the only thing." According to the terms of Barnes' resignation agreement with the mayor, he was promised a lump sum of $600,000, a $60,000 relocation benefit, and the ability to retain his $50,000 signing bonus. The contract further stipulated that Barnes waive the right to take legal action against the City of Seattle concerning his tenure as chief of police.

=== MissionRT ===
In October 2026, following his resignation as Seattle chief of police, Barnes was hired as Head of Public Safety Programs and Strategy at Mission Ready Technologies (MissionRT), an Arizona-based company that sells law enforcement technology to law enforcement agencies across America.

== Personal life ==
Barnes is married to Dr. Stephanie Dance-Barnes, a cancer biologist and the Dean of the College of Science and Health at DePaul University. They have three children, Ashlee, Aeiden, and Addison.

Barnes serves as an executive board member of the National Association of Black Law Enforcement Officers, an advisory board member of the University of Virginia School of Continuing and Professional Studies Center for Public Safety and Justice, and a member of the National Policing Institute's Council on Policing Reforms and Race.
