= Pat Garofalo =

American politician

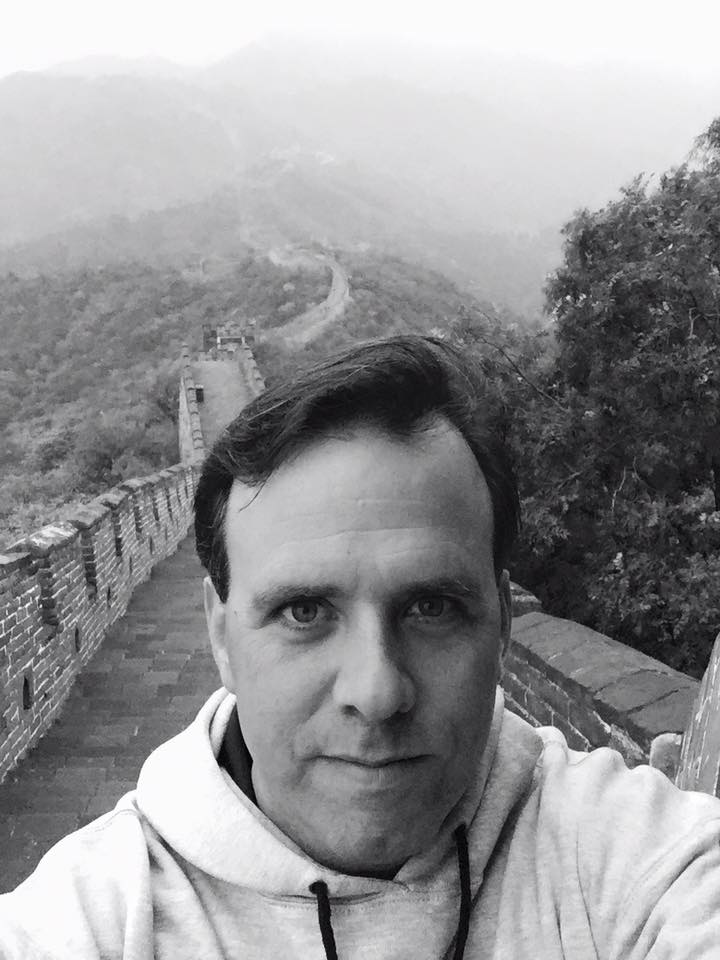

Member of the Minnesota House of Representatives from the 58B district 36B (2005–2013)
- In office January 4, 2005 – July 14, 2024
- Preceded by: Steve Strachan
- Succeeded by: Drew Roach

Personal details
- Born: September 23, 1971 (age 55) Saint Paul, Minnesota
- Party: Republican Party of Minnesota
- Spouse: Julie Garofalo
- Children: 2
- Education: Minnesota State University, Mankato (B.S.)
- Occupation: Network engineer, Legislator

Patrick "Pat" Garofalo (born September 23, 1971) is an American politician and former member of the Minnesota House of Representatives. A member of the Republican Party of Minnesota, he represented District 58B, which includes portions of Dakota and Goodhue counties in the southeastern Twin Cities metropolitan area, from 2005 to 2024.

== Education ==
Born in 1971 in Saint Paul, Minnesota, Garofalo graduated from Rosemount High School in Rosemount in 1989, then went on to Minnesota State University, Mankato in Mankato, earning his B.S. in law enforcement in 1994.

== Minnesota House of Representatives ==
Garofalo was first elected in 2004 and was reelected every two years thereafter. In February 2008, he was named assistant minority whip for the Republican caucus. Garofalo served one term as chair of the Education Finance Committee in 2011–12, and chaired the Job Growth & Energy Affordability Committee from 2015 to 2018. He served as the minority lead of the Ways and Means Committee.

In March 2015, Garofalo posted on Twitter that if a majority of National Basketball Association teams were to fold, "nobody would notice a difference [with the] possible exception of increase in streetcrime [sic]." He said he was making an observation about crime among professional athletes, not a racist comment. He later apologized.

In 2015, after U.S. Representative John Kline announced he was not running for reelection, attention turned to Garofalo as a possible contender for the seat. After a recruiting visit to Washington, D.C., with House leadership, Garofalo told local media, "I would rather stick a fork in my eye than run for Congress".

In 2021, Garofalo called the U.S. Capitol attack by Donald Trump supporters "ridiculous" and "banana republic shit".

In January 2024, Garofalo announced that he would not seek reelection after his term finished. In a letter to Governor Tim Walz dated July 9, 2024, he gave notice of his intent to resign. Garofalo stepped down effective July 14 at 11:59 PM.

== Personal life ==
Pat Garofalo is married to Julie (Rohloff) Garofalo, has two children, and lives in Farmington, Minnesota. He is a network engineer who works on computer infrastructure and IP telephony systems, and was the technology coordinator for Tim Pawlenty's 2002 gubernatorial campaign.

== Electoral history ==
Minnesota House of Representatives, House District 58B election, 2018
Party	Candidate	Votes	%
Republican	Patrick Garofalo	11,549	58.84
DFL	Marla Vagts	8,060	41.06
	Write-in	20	0.10
	Total votes	19,629	100
Republican hold			

Minnesota House of Representatives, House District 58B election, 2016
Party	Candidate	Votes	%
Republican	Patrick Garofalo	13,926	64.78
DFL	Marla Vagts	7,542	35.08
	Write-in	29	0.13
	Total votes	21,497	100
Republican hold			

Minnesota House of Representatives, House District 58B election, 2014
Party	Candidate	Votes	%
Republican	Patrick Garofalo	8,878	63.85
DFL	Marla Vagts	5,008	36.02
	Write-in	18	0.13
	Total votes	13,904	100
Republican hold			

Minnesota House of Representatives, House District 58B election, 2012
Party	Candidate	Votes	%
Republican	Patrick Garofalo	12,520	59.47
DFL	Jim Arlt	8,512	40.04
	Write-in	19	0.09
	Total votes	21,051	100
Republican hold			

Minnesota House of Representatives, House District 36B election, 2010
Party	Candidate	Votes	%
Republican	Patrick Garofalo	12,317	65.81
DFL	Sigrid Iversen	6,381	34.10
	Write-in	17	0.09
	Total votes	18,715	100
Republican hold			

Minnesota House of Representatives, House District 36B election, 2008
Party	Candidate	Votes	%
Republican	Patrick Garofalo	14,235	56.01
DFL	Bev Topp	11,144	43.85
	Write-in	36	0.14
	Total votes	25,415	100
Republican hold			

Minnesota House of Representatives, House District 36B election, 2006
Party	Candidate	Votes	%
Republican	Patrick Garofalo	10,304	55.85
DFL	Paul Hardt	8,123	44.03
	Write-in	23	0.12
	Total votes	18,450	100
Republican hold			

Minnesota's House of Representatives, House District 36B election, 2004
Party	Candidate	Votes	%
Republican	Patrick Garofalo	14,511	62.39
DFL	Benjamin Coler	8,718	37.48
	Write-in	31	0.13
	Total votes	23,260	100
Republican hold			
