= Pauline Van Senus =

American community organizer and volunteer

- Born: 1957 or 1958 (age 67–68); Seattle, Washington, U.S.
- Other names: Transit Fairy

Pauline Van Senus, also known as the Transit Fairy, is an American community organizer and volunteer known for cleaning and decorating transit stops in Seattle. In January 2026, Van Senus administered the oath of office for the inauguration of Katie Wilson as mayor of Seattle.

Van Senus is a founding member of the Transit Riders Union, an organization created in 2011 to advocate for improvements to public transportation in King County. In 2019, she began commuting from her home in White Center to South Lake Union to clean trash around bus stops. At the time, Van Sensus worked as a house cleaner. During the COVID-19 pandemic, she began volunteering full time, supported by donations. In June 2024, she was assaulted while volunteering and taken to Harborview Medical Center for treatment. She was able to return to cleaning bus stops two weeks later, saying she was "not mad" at her attacker.
