= Steve Strachan (sheriff) =

American politician

32nd King County Sheriff
- In office April 1, 2012 – November 28, 2012
- Preceded by: Sue Rahr
- Succeeded by: John Urquhart

Minnesota House of Representatives District 36B
- In office January 7, 2003 – January 4, 2005
- Preceded by: David Knutson
- Succeeded by: Pat Garofalo

Personal details
- Born: January 26, 1965 (age 61) Northfield, Minnesota, U.S.
- Party: Republican
- Spouse: Sue
- Education: University of Minnesota; Minnesota State University, Mankato
- Occupation: Law Enforcement Officer

Steve Strachan (born January 26, 1965) is an American law enforcement officer and politician. He has served as the Chief of the Bremerton, Washington Police Department, Chief of the Lakeville, Minnesota Police Department, the Chief of the Kent, Washington Police Department, and the Sheriff of King County, Washington. He also served as a Member of the Minnesota House of Representatives, representing District 36B.

== Career ==
Strachan was born in Northfield, Minnesota in 1965. He attended Northfield High School, graduating in 1983. Two years later, he began his job in law enforcement as a part-time jail deputy in Carver County, Minnesota. He served in that position for two years, from 1985-1987, before joining the Lakeville, Minnesota Police Department as a full-time police officer. While serving in the department, Strachan attended the University of Minnesota, receiving a Bachelor's degree in sociology in 1991, as well as Minnesota State University, Mankato, receiving a Master of Public Administration degree in 1995. He rose up through the ranks, becoming a Sergeant, a Detective, and ultimately the Chief of Police.

During his time with the Lakeville Police Department, Strachan also served in a number of political positions. From 1996-2002, he was City Councilman in Farmington, Minnesota. From 2003-2004, he served one term in the Minnesota House of Representatives, representing District 36B in the 83rd Minnesota Legislature. He served on the Governmental Operations and Veterans Affairs Policy Committee, the Judiciary Policy and Finance Committee, and the State Government Finance Committee.

In 2006, then-Chief of Police Strachan left the Lakeville Police Department in order to become the Chief of the Kent Police Department in Kent, Washington. He served in this position for five years (until 2011), at which point he became Chief Deputy Sheriff of King County, Washington under Sheriff Sue Rahr. When Rahr resigned in April 2012, Strachan was appointed sheriff. He served in this position until November 2012, when he lost his election campaign to John Urquhart.

Strachan stepped down as Bremerton police chief at the end of 2017 to become the executive director of the Washington Association of Sheriffs and Police Chiefs.

Political offices
Preceded by Sue Rahr	King County Sheriff; April 2012 - November 2012	Succeeded by John Urquhart
