= John Urquhart (sheriff) =

American sheriff

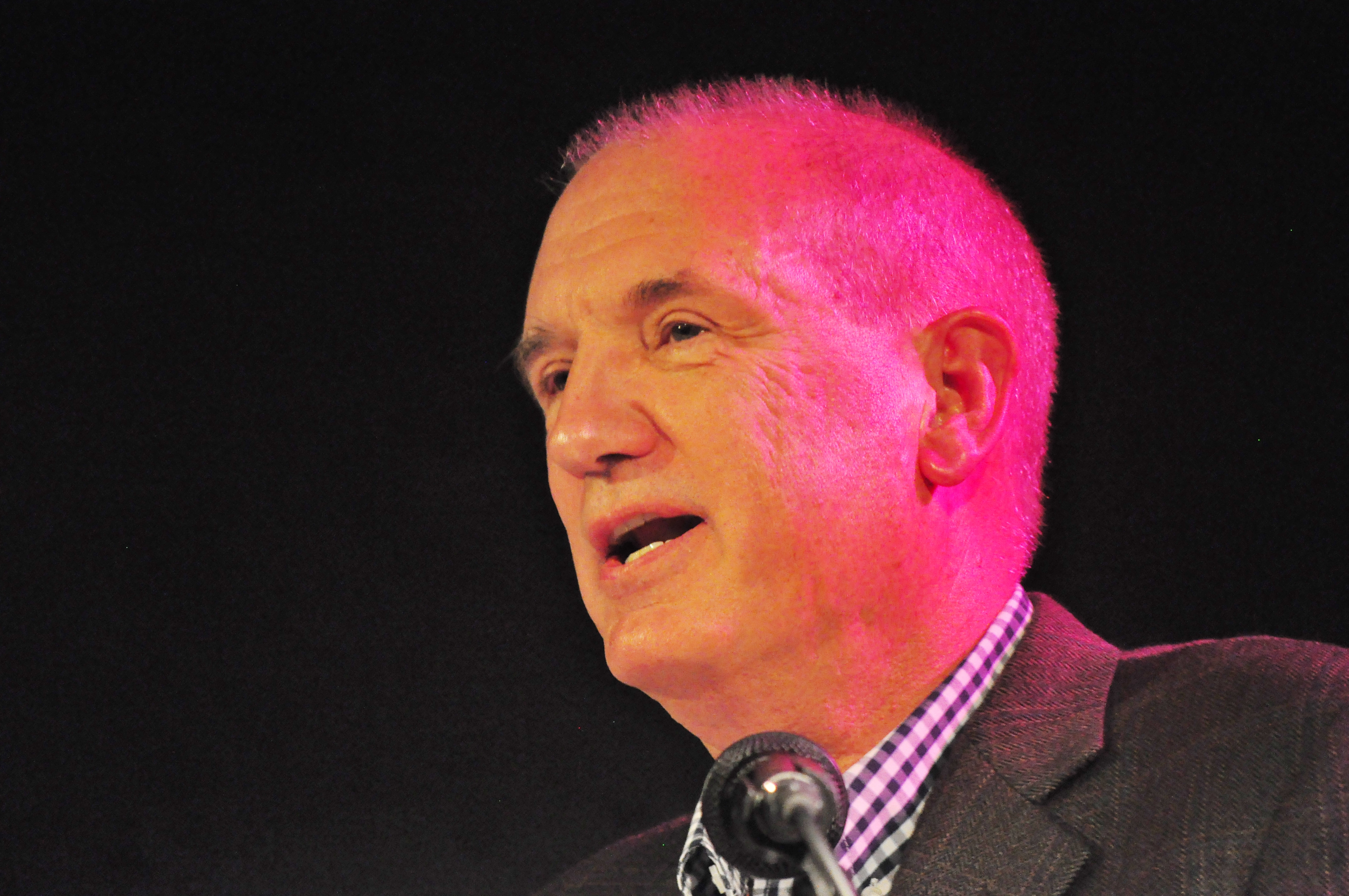
- John Urquhart, 2014

33rd King County Sheriff
- In office November 28, 2012 – January 2, 2018
- Preceded by: Steve Strachan
- Succeeded by: Mitzi Johanknecht

Personal details
- Born: November 10, 1947 (age 78) Seattle, Washington, USA
- Party: Democratic
- Spouse: Shelley
- Children: 2
- Education: University of Washington
- Occupation: Law Enforcement Officer

John W. Urquhart (born November 10, 1947) was the 33rd sheriff of King County, Washington and a Democrat. He served as the county's chief law enforcement official and oversaw the more than 1000 employees of the King County Sheriff's Office.

== Early life ==
Urquhart grew up in Seattle, Washington. He attended Ingraham High School, graduating in 1967 as class president. He then attended the University of Washington, graduating with a Bachelor's degree in business in 1971. He owned an electrical construction materials business in Bellevue, which he sold in 1988.

== Career ==
Urquhart's first job in law enforcement was as a Reserve Deputy Sheriff for the Island County Sheriff's Department, serving from 1975 to 1980. He then joined the King County Sheriff's Office as a Reserve Deputy Sheriff in 1980, eventually becoming in a full-time Deputy Sheriff in 1988. He was voted officer of the year for the Burien precinct in 1991. He was overall officer of the year in 1992.

During his 24-year career with the department, he served in a number of roles including: field training officer, narcotics detective, sergeant, administrative aide to the sheriff, and spokesman. He retired in February 2012 and became president of the S.H.E.R.I.F.F. Fund, a non-profit organization.

In late 2012, Urquhart decided to enter the race for King County Sheriff, a non-partisan elected office. He was elected as King County Sheriff in November 2012, defeating Republican Steve Strachan with 56 percent of the vote. He immediately hired Anne Kirkpatrick, chief of the Spokane Police Department, as his second in command.

In 2016, Urquhart was criticized for his handling of an allegation from a former sheriff's deputy that he raped her in 2002. The Seattle Police Department investigated the allegation with assistance from the King County Prosecuting Attorney's Office. The deputy prosecutor noted that the allegation was beyond the statute of limitations, and even if it wasn't, no probable cause existed to charge Urquhart with a crime. In addition to the rape allegation, the woman claimed, without evidence, that Urquhart "had hired people to follow her, hired people to turn on her apartment stove to cause an explosion, and that someone had tried to run her down in Massachusetts," according to a memo prepared by the investigator.

Another former deputy accused Urquhart of groping him in September 2017, two months before Urquhart's reelection attempt; Urquhart denied the allegations and referred to that deputy as an "organizational terrorist" with a history of filing frivolous complaints against supervisors while employed at King County. The deputy left employment with King County several years earlier after receiving $160,000 in an unusual settlement that was mistakenly not approved by the King County Executive's office according to the county's risk management director. Urquhart did not face charges for the groping allegation. Urquhart sued the deputy for defamation and released the results of a polygraph clearing Urquhart of any deception in the matter.

Urquhart ran for reelection as King County Sheriff in 2017 and was defeated by challenger Mitzi Johanknecht, a major from the Southwest Precinct.

== Personal life ==
Urquhart's wife is Shelley. They have two children.

Political offices
Preceded by Steve Strachan	King County Sheriff; 2012–2018	Succeeded by Mitzi Johanknecht
