= Stadium district =

Mixed-use retail and entertainment development

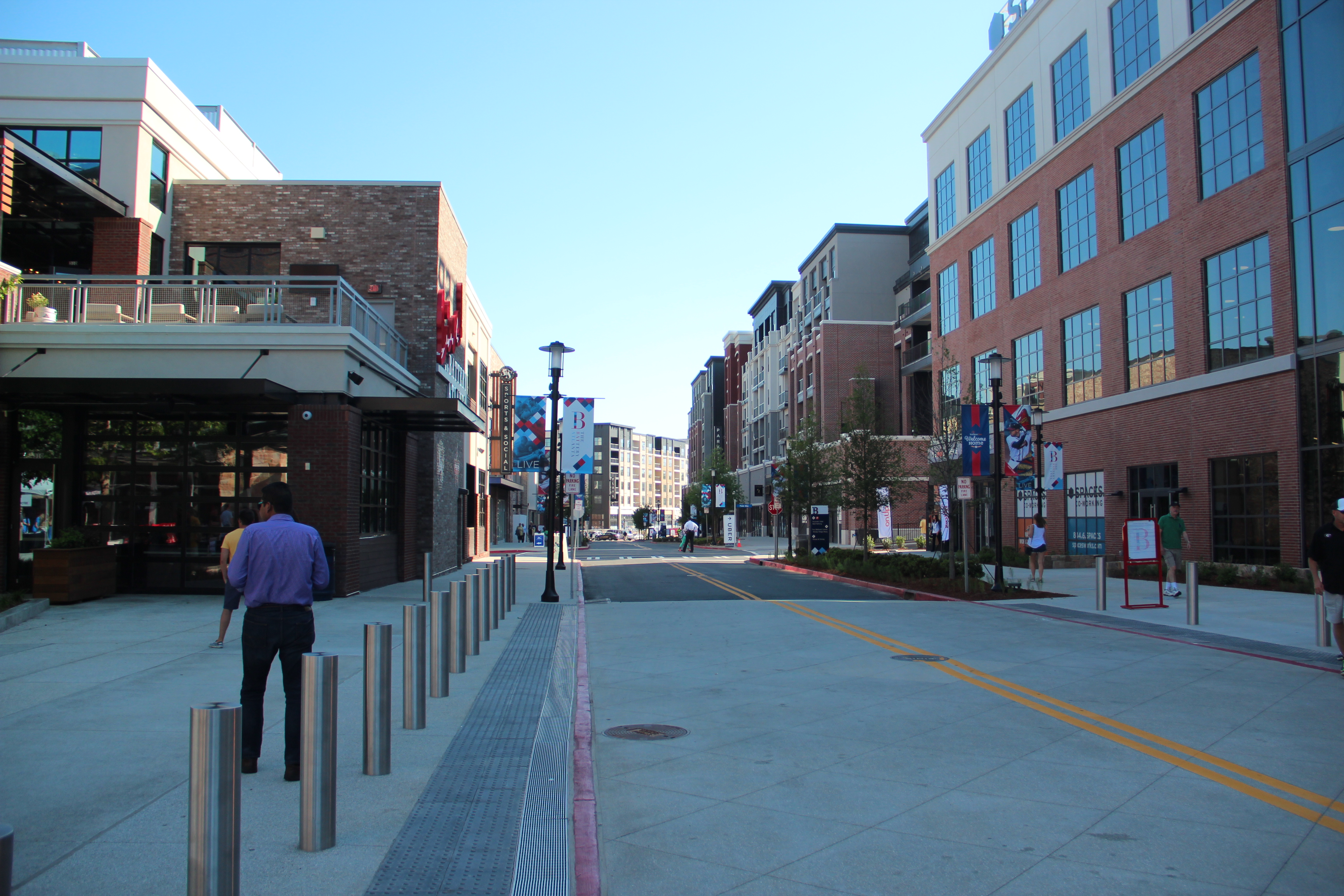
The Battery Atlanta is a mixed-use development adjacent to Truist Park

A stadium district is a mixed-use retail and entertainment district centered around a large collegiate or professional sports stadium. It may also refer to a legal special district that is constituted for the financing and maintenance of a professional stadium.

== History ==
In the 2000s and 2010s, as more cities started to balk at the idea of using large amounts of public tax revenue to build stadiums for rich owners, developers started to offer incentives to convince cities to chip in with the promise of revitalizing downtown neighborhoods or creating new ones by building shops, entertainment venues, offices, and residences on or near the stadium site; these sites would also generate tax revenues to pay for the sports facility and entice customers to stay longer in the area.

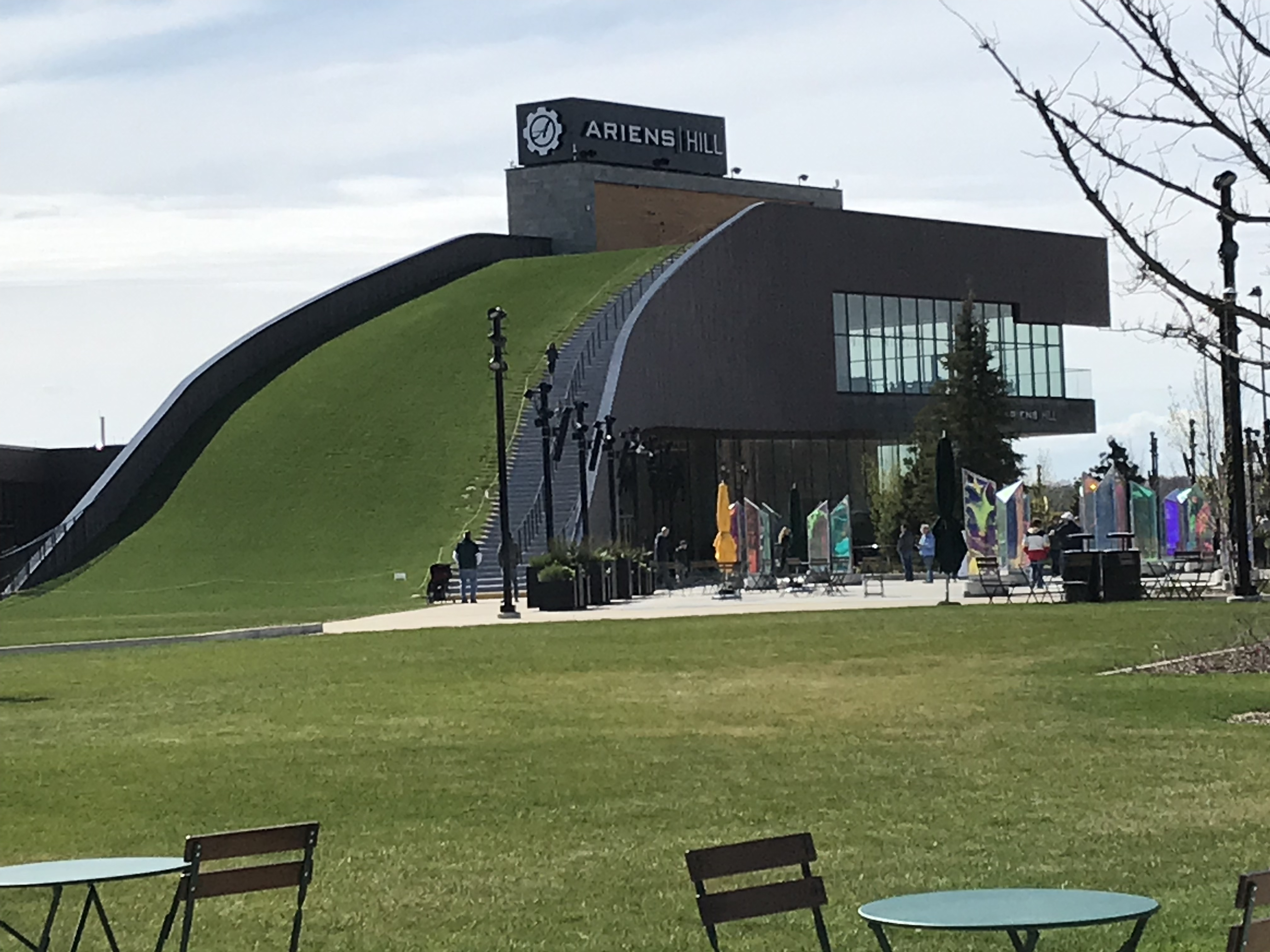
Ariens Hill, a seasonal skiing hill, at the Titletown District in Green Bay, Wisconsin

The area around Nationwide Arena in Columbus, Ohio, completed in 2000, was considered the first sports-anchored stadium district. That same year, the St. Louis Cardinals proposed a new stadium to anchor a larger "ballpark village" which would occupy the site of the previous Busch Stadium; it in turn was inspired by the residential rooftops around Wrigley Field. While a similar project was proposed around what became Petco Park, it took 17 years to break ground due to financing issues and environmental concerns. The Cordish Companies, which developed Ballpark Village in St. Louis, has gone on to similar developments around other stadiums; one, the Kansas City Power & Light District, was credited with leading to the development of a streetcar line to the site.

In the 2020s, several universities began pursuing mixed-use districts in order to generate funding for their athletic departments, such as CyTown at Iowa State University and the Gateway District at the University of Kansas.

== Characteristics ==
Stadium districts often include a variety of uses, so as to provide year-round, all-day activation of the area with uses beyond the sports facility itself. These typically include public squares and gathering places, an amenity now considered "absolutely critical"; offices, including corporate headquarters; hotels and residential units that can support the retail businesses; and other event spaces that can support additional types of events. In the Milwaukee Bucks' experience with the Deer District, the team has been able to charge higher rates for square footage because of the unique positioning of the property.

Districts often host watch parties for major events, especially playoff games of the associated teams. During the Bucks' run to the 2021 NBA Finals, the Deer District plaza, which holds 8,000, was augmented with space for another 20,000 on the former Bradley Center site. For the clinching Game 6 of the Finals, further space was designated to expand capacity to 65,000 fans; even then, crowds were turned back before halftime.

== Examples ==
=== United States ===
- Patriot Place near Gillette Stadium, Foxborough, Massachusetts
- L.A. Live near Staples Center, Los Angeles
- Downtown Commons near Golden 1 Center, Sacramento
- Deer District near Fiserv Forum, Milwaukee
- Texas Live! near Globe Life Field in Arlington, Texas
- Stateside Live! near Citizens Bank Park and Lincoln Financial Field
- St. Louis Ballpark Village near Busch Stadium
- The Battery Atlanta near Truist Park, Cobb County, Georgia
- Titletown District near Lambeau Field, Green Bay, Wisconsin
- The District Detroit near Little Caesars Arena, Detroit

=== Canada ===
- Ice District near Rogers Place, Edmonton
- Maple Leaf Square near Scotiabank Arena, Toronto
- True North Square near MTS Centre, Winnipeg

=== Outside of North America ===
- Northumberland Development Project near Tottenham Hotspur Stadium, London

== Legal stadium districts ==
Stadium districts may also be created as the result of a legal action, to raise funds for and then maintain a professional sports stadium. In 1989, the Colorado General Assembly created the Denver Metropolitan Major League Baseball Stadium District, which was empowered to levy a tax in seven metropolitan Denver counties for the construction of Coors Field. Seven years later, the Metropolitan Football Stadium District was chartered, leading to the construction of Empower Field at Mile High. The Maricopa County Stadium District, created in 1991, provided funding for seven new spring training stadiums in the Cactus League and then financed a portion of the construction costs of Chase Field. Wisconsin also has a stadium district, the Southeast Wisconsin Professional Baseball Park District, which developed American Family Field.
