= Sue Rahr =

American law enforcement officer

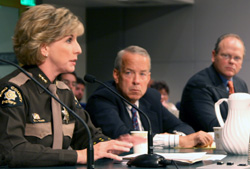
- Rahr (left) in 2008

Interim Police Chief of the Seattle Police Department
- In office May 30, 2024 – January 31, 2025
- Preceded by: Adrian Z. Diaz
- Succeeded by: Shon Barnes

31st Sheriff of King County
- In office January 3, 2005 – March 31, 2012
- Preceded by: Dave Reichert
- Succeeded by: Steve Strachan

Personal details
- Born: Susan L. Rahr Laramie, Wyoming, U.S.
- Education: Washington State University (BA)

Susan L. Rahr is a former American law enforcement officer who served as the Sheriff of King County, Washington from 2005 to 2012, the first woman to hold the position. Her tenure as sheriff drew scrutiny over the department's handling of deputy misconduct and internal discipline, including a Seattle Post-Intelligencer investigative series and her settlement with detective Dan Ring. In 2012 she became executive director of the Washington State Criminal Justice Training Commission, and she was Interim Police Chief of the Seattle Police Department from May 30, 2024 to January 31, 2025.

== Early life and education ==
Rahr was born in Laramie, Wyoming and raised in Bellevue, Washington. Rahr earned a Bachelor of Arts degree in Criminal Justice from Washington State University, graduating cum laude. She also attended the National Sheriff’s Institute and Federal Bureau of Investigation National Executive Institute.

== Career ==
Rahr began her career with the King County Sheriff's Office in 1979. Rahr initially intended on working as a police officer until she had enough money for law school, but later decided against it. Following her promotion to sergeant, she became a patrol supervisor and worked in the Burglary/Larceny, Proactive, Criminal Warrants, and Special Assault Units. Six years later, she was promoted to operations captain. She later served as the commander of the Internal Investigations and Gang Units, and the Special Investigations Section. She was promoted to major in 1997, and was selected to be the police chief for Shoreline in 1998. She was Chief of the Sheriff's Office Field Operations Division for 4.5 years before being appointed by outgoing Sheriff Dave Reichert after he was elected to the United States House of Representatives. The first woman to hold the position, Rahr was elected sheriff in November 2005. She ran, unopposed for re-election on November 3, 2009, and received 97.45% of the vote.

Rahr's early tenure coincided with the Seattle Post-Intelligencer's year-long "Conduct Unbecoming" investigative series, which began in 2005 and reported on years of deputy misconduct and shortcomings in the sheriff's office's internal disciplinary system. Rahr drew criticism for allowing vice detective Dan Ring, who faced multiple criminal charges including using his police authority to protect an online prostitution operation, to retire with a $10,000 payment rather than stand trial; Rahr said at the time that her goal was to remove Ring from the department. The settlement became a point of attack in her 2005 election campaign against Seattle police lieutenant Greg Schmidt. She was also criticized for choosing to investigate the department internally rather than accepting greater outside oversight.

In 2007, after a week of public criticism over her department's handling of the disappearance of Tanya Rider, who was found alive after being trapped in her wrecked vehicle for days, Rahr acknowledged that the office's 911 call center could have handled the calls better and said she would review how missing-person reports were processed. In 2009, Rahr fired deputy Paul Schene, who was charged with misdemeanor assault after being accused of beating a 15-year-old girl in a holding cell in an incident captured on video; the department sustained internal allegations against him including excessive use of force and making false statements.

In May 2009, sheriff's deputy Matthew Paul, working a Metro Transit assignment, shoved Christopher Sean Harris into a wall in Seattle's Belltown neighborhood after deputies mistook him for an assault suspect, leaving Harris permanently brain-damaged. An internal investigation cleared Paul, who remained on the force, and prosecutors did not file charges. In January 2011, King County agreed to pay Harris's family $10 million, at the time the largest individual settlement ever paid by the county. In 2012, a judge sanctioned the county $300,000 for withholding documents concerning prior internal concerns about Paul's use of force, calling the failure "reprehensible". Harris died in 2015, and a coroner ruled his death a homicide resulting from the head trauma.

On March 31, 2012, Rahr resigned to serve as the Executive Director of the Washington State Criminal Justice Training Commission. She appointed Chief Deputy Steve Strachan to fill the position until a new sheriff was elected. Rahr also serves on the Advisory Board of Central Washington University’s Law and Justice Department. Rahr serves as a regular featured speaker at MPD's DC Police Leadership Academy.

On May 30, 2024, Rahr was appointed Interim Police Chief of the Seattle Police Department (SPD) by Seattle Mayor Bruce Harrell. Rahr was appointed to replace Chief Adrian Diaz, who was removed and reassigned to other special assignments within the SPD. Diaz was removed after he was named by at least six SPD officers in lawsuits against the department alleging discrimination. Rahr stated she would serve only on an interim basis, and worked with former SPD Chief Kathleen O'Toole to compile a list of qualified candidates for the permanent position.

In July 2024, Rahr fired officer Daniel Auderer, a vice president of the Seattle Police Officers Guild, over body-camera-recorded remarks in which he laughed about and minimized the January 2023 death of Jaahnavi Kandula, a graduate student struck and killed by a speeding police vehicle. Auderer subsequently filed a $20 million claim against the city, asserting that his firing was retaliation for his union leadership. In January 2025, Rahr fired Kevin Dave, the officer who struck Kandula, after the city's Office of Police Accountability found he had violated four department policies, including safe operation of a patrol vehicle. Rahr was succeeded as chief by Shon Barnes on February 1, 2025.

Political offices
Preceded by Dave Reichert	King County Sheriff; 2005-2012	Succeeded by Steve Strachan
