= King County Sheriff's Office =

- Patch of the King County Sheriff's Office
- Abbreviation: KCSO
- Motto: Every Call Counts

Agency overview
- Formed: 1852; 174 years ago
- Preceding agency: Municipal Police

Jurisdictional structure
- Operations jurisdiction: King County, Washington, U.S.
- Population: 2.1 million
- Governing body: King County Council
- General nature: Local civilian police

Operational structure
- Headquarters: King County Courthouse
- Agency executive: Patti Cole-Tindall, Sheriff
- Units: 4: Field Operations Division; Criminal Investigations Division; Special Operations Division; Technical Services Division

Facilities
- Precincts: 4
- Police boats: Yes
- Helicopters: 6

Website
- kingcounty.gov/sheriff

The King County Sheriff's Office (KCSO) is a local law enforcement agency in King County, Washington, United States. It is the primary law enforcement agency for all unincorporated areas of King County, as well as 13 cities and two transit agencies which contract their police services to the KCSO. KCSO also provides police and fire Aircraft Rescue and Fire Fighting to King County International Airport (Boeing Field). KCSO also provides regional-level support services to other local law enforcement agencies such as air support and search and rescue. The department has over 1,000 employees and serves 2.1 million citizens, over 500,000 of whom live in either unincorporated areas or the 13 contract cities.

The current Sheriff of King County is Patti Cole-Tindall, the former Undersheriff within the department. Cole-Tindall was appointed in November 2021 and was sworn in on January 1, 2022, then confirmed as permanent sheriff by the King County Council on May 23, 2022.

== History ==
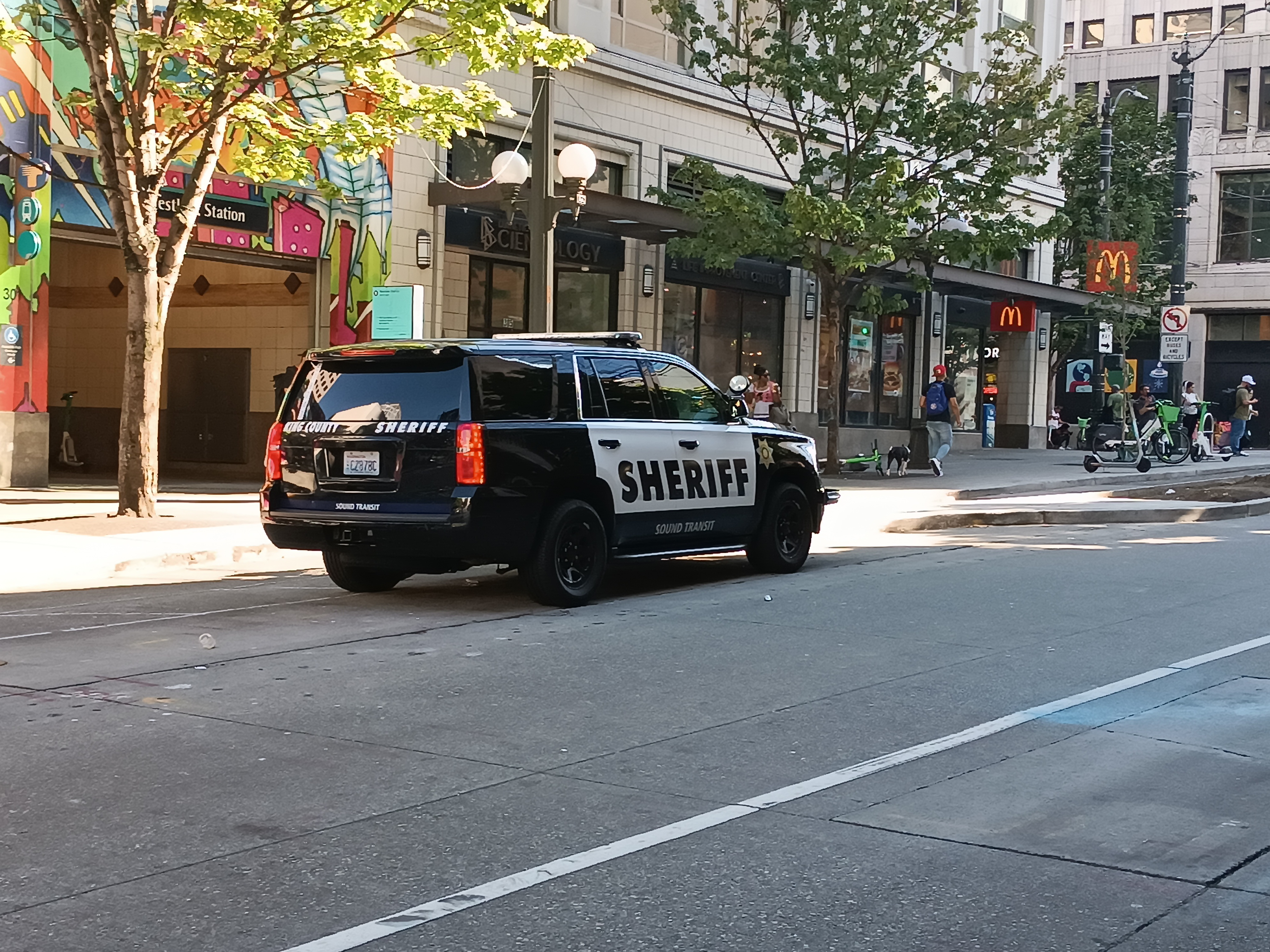
A King County Sheriff's Office vehicle in Seattle

The first King County Sheriff was elected in 1852. The office was renamed the King County Department of Public Safety after voters approved a charter change in 1968, and the director would be appointed. In the 1980s, the name of the department was again changed, this time to the King County Police Department. In 1996, voters decided to reinstate voting for the sheriff and the name was changed back to the King County Sheriff’s Office. However, in 2020, voters decided to return to an appointed sheriff and to allow the King County Council to change the duties of the sheriff.

As a result of the 2020 election, on December 31, 2021, Sheriff Mitzi Johanknecht finished out her elected term. Johanknecht's Undersheriff, Patti Cole-Tindall was appointed as Interim Sheriff by Executive Dow Constantine.

=== Sheriffs ===
- Matthew Starwich, 1920-1927
- Barney Winckoski, 1981-1983
- Jim Nickle (acting sheriff), 1983
- Vernon Thomas, 1983-1987
- Jim Nickle (acting sheriff), 1987-1988
- James Montgomery, 1988-1997
- Dave Reichert, 1997-2004
- Sue Rahr, 2005-2012
- Steve Strachan, 2012
- John Urquhart, 2012-2018
- Mitzi Johanknecht, 2018-2021
- Patti Cole-Tindall, current

=== Office of Law Enforcement Oversight (OLEO) ===
In 2006, the King County Council passed Ordinance 15611 which started the process of implementing independent oversight within the KCSO. The ordinance was passed in response to decreasing public confidence after Seattle Post-Intelligencer released a three-part series documenting cases of misconduct and criticizing the disciplinary measures applied to officers. After Ordinance 15611 was passed, the King County Police Officer's Guild (KCPOG) filed an unfair labor practices claim; negotiations on the ordinance continued for three years until Ordinance 16511 was passed in May 2009. This ordinance created the Office of Law Enforcement Oversight (OLEO) and tasked the organization with releasing annual reports of documented complaints as well as advising KCSO on future areas of improvement. When an individual files a complaint, the Sheriff's Offices' Internal Investigations Unit (IIU) is given 180 days to investigate and report findings to the OLEO, which are then certified based on whether or not IIU sufficiently addressed the issue. The official website highlights the sponsorship of then-councilmen Bob Ferguson, Larry Phillips, and Larry Gossett of Ordinances 15611 and 16511 in the passage of the legislation.

In 2022, OLEO released their annual report which found a 22% decline in allegations of misconduct, but allegations of officers' use of excessive force increased from 58 to 73 complaints. The report also found that officers with three or more allegations made up about 5% of the sworn force, but 40% of all allegations, and ten employees with 5-7 allegations made up 17% of total allegations. The Seattle Times reported the findings in 2023 alongside a comment from Sheriff Patti Cole-Tindall: "Our staff and I are already discussing the report’s findings and which of those findings we might implement. The report is informing how we look at, change and develop new policies, practices and training within the KCSO.”

== Divisions ==
- Office of the Sheriff - includes the Sheriff, Undersheriff, chief of staff, aides, a media relations officer, labor negotiator, the Internal Investigations Unit, and the Legal Unit.
- Field Operations Division - manages the core functions of patrol, precinct-based detectives, crime prevention, storefronts, and reserve deputies. The subdivision into four precincts allows for better community-based responses because the precinct commanders can use local data to direct law enforcement services. Day-to-day management of contract city police and school resource officers is the responsibility of this division.
- Special Operations Division - provides support services to other divisions, regional services to local agencies, and contract police service to the King County Metro Transit Division (including Sound Transit Police), King County Department of Transportation (Motor Unit (disbanded 10/1/12)), and the King County International Airport ARFF Police. Services provided by this division include a K-9 unit with search and drug detection capabilities; Air Support (Guardian One); Marine Unit; Bomb Squad; tactical training in firearms, less-lethal weapons, and defensive tactics; Tac-30 (SWAT); hostage negotiations; dignitary protection; tow coordination and appeal hearings; Search & Rescue; D.M.T. (Demonstration Management Team); instruction in and equipment for Haz-Mat; and special event planning and coordination. The division has also taken the lead in planning for homeland security concerns.
- Criminal Investigations Division (CID) - includes the Major Crimes Section, the Special Investigations Section, and the King County Regional Criminal Intelligence Group. The division serves citizens with follow-up investigative, warrant, and intelligence-gathering services. Specifically, it investigates crimes including homicide, domestic violence, computer fraud, forgery, sexual assault, and more. CID also addresses child support enforcement issues.
- Technical Services Division - provides the bulk of support services that are vital to efficient operations. Often, the employees in this division provide direct services to citizens as well as support services to the other divisions. Services provided by the division personnel include emergency 9-1-1 call receiving and dispatching, managing court security (County Marshals), technology development, records, contracting, civil process, personnel/hiring, payroll, purchasing, training, photography, application and administration of grants, planning, and all aspects of fingerprint identification.

== Contract cities ==
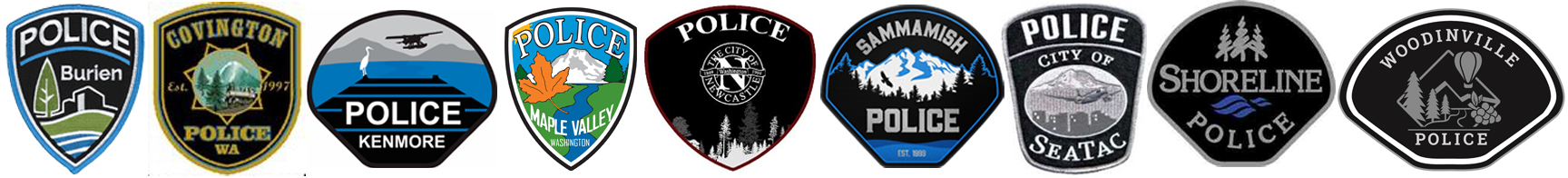
King County, WA Contract City Patches 2025

The following cities contract their police departments to KCSO:

- Beaux Arts Village
- Burien
- Carnation
- Covington
- Kenmore
- Maple Valley
- Newcastle
- North Bend (Begins April 1st, 2026)
- Sammamish
- SeaTac
- Shoreline
- Skykomish
- Woodinville

=== Other contracts ===
- King County International Airport Police/Fire ARFF (Boeing Field)
- King County Dept. of Transportation: Roads Division
- Muckleshoot Indian Tribe
- Metro Transit Police
- Sound Transit Police
- King County Marshals
- King County Fire/Arson Investigators
- c. 15 additional contract services from school districts to security
- Marine Patrol contract to the cities of Beaux Arts, Bellevue, Issaquah, Kenmore, Kirkland, Redmond, Sammamish, and Yarrow Point. Marine calls for service only on all other King County Sheriff's Office city patrol contracts.

Most of the contracts within the Sheriff's Office have their own patch and patrol car design and wear a King County Sheriff badge, while other contracts have no identity other than the King County Sheriff uniform, patch and patrol car. Those contracts that don't have their own identity are Beaux Arts Village, Skykomish, Muckleshoot Tribe (they wear a tribal patch on each sleeve beneath the King County Sheriff patch) and King County Metro Transit. King County Metro Transit Police, a unit of the sheriff's office, do have their own style of patrol car specific to Metro Police, and their uniform with the standard King County Sheriff patch. The city of North Bend contracted with the KCSO from 1973 until March 8, 2014, when the City of Snoqualmie Police Department took over the policing duties in North Bend, at that time the North Bend contract was KCSO's longest-standing contract. The City of North Bend voted unanimously 4/5/25 to return policing services to the King County Sheriff's Office, rejecting a contract renewal with the Snoqualmie Police Department.

The KCSO Motor Unit existed under contract with the King County Department of Transportation: Roads Division, which in turn provided funding for S.T.E.P (the Selective Traffic Enforcement Program) which targeted select arterials within unincorporated King County based on a history of accidents, chronic traffic problems, and high citizen complaints. The KCSO Motors Unit wore the standard KCSO patch and Class A uniform and rode Honda KCSO marked police motorcycles. The Motor Unit participated in traffic enforcement, instructor certifications, dignitary protection and escort, parades and special events, educational and school activities as well as extensive motorcycle training. This unit was disbanded on October 1, 2012. The contract cities of Sammamish, Maple Valley and SeaTac each have full-time motorcycle deputies assigned to traffic patrol duties.

== Rank structure ==
Title	Insignia
Sheriff	
Undersheriff*	
Chief	
Major	
Captain	
Sergeant	
Master Police Officer (Deputy)	
Deputy	

- Contract city chiefs wear three stars when in their contract uniform and one star when in a KCSO uniform.

== King County Sheriff Explorers ==
The King County Sheriff's Office has a volunteer program for individuals between the ages of 14 and 21 who are interested in investigating a career in the field of law enforcement. The program is called the King County Sheriff Explorers and is a local post of the Learning for Life Exploring program. The explorer post has a rank structure similar to the Sheriff's Office. The explorers attend academies and competitions, ride along with deputies on patrol, and receive training on a variety of law enforcement topics.

There are four Explorer posts in cities contracted with the King County Sheriff's Office, those being an unincorporated post in Woodinville, as well as city posts in Maple Valley, Burien, and Sammamish.

== Controversy ==
In February 2012, Dustin Theoharis was shot sixteen times by a sheriff's deputy and a Department of Corrections officer as he lay in his bed. The officers were attempting to search the home for another man when they saw Theoharis move and they opened fire. Officers responding to the shooting allegedly failed to gather evidence, moved items at the crime scene and acted as advocates for the shooters. An internal investigation found no wrongdoing on the part of the officers. The officers involved refused to cooperate with the investigation. The state settled a lawsuit for $2.5 million. The county agreed to pay $3 million to settle the matter. Sheriff John Urquhart pointed out to the press that he was not responsible for this incident as he had not yet been elected.

In 2017, Detective Richard Rowe, in plain clothes, approached a motorcyclist from behind with his gun drawn and without identifying himself as a law enforcement officer for a full minute. He also reached into the motorcyclist's pocket to pull out his wallet so that an observer might think an armed robbery was in progress. The department later settled the case with a $65,000 payment to the victim and agreed to modify its use-of-force policy.

In March 2021, the King County Sheriff's Office agreed to pay out a $5 million settlement to the family of Tommy Le, a 20-year-old high school student who was shot and killed by Deputy Cesar Molina in 2017. Deputies had encountered Le while responding to a report of a disoriented man who may have been armed with a knife or sharp object. The sheriff's office initially stated that Le attacked deputies with a knife or other sharp object and that Molina shot Le in self-defence. An investigation by the sheriff's office Use of Force Board cleared the shooting on the basis that deputies "reasonably believed that [Le] was armed with a deadly weapon and had already attacked someone with a knife". However, a subsequent outside review of the case found a "lack of rigor" in the sheriff's office's investigation, pointing to significant issues such as evidence suggesting that Le was likely moving away from the deputies when he was shot. The review also found that while Le was found to be carrying a ballpoint pen during the encounter, KCSO investigators spent a large amount of their time trying to find the knife reported by one witness to justify the shooting.

== See also ==
- List of law enforcement agencies in Washington (state)
