= National Association of Black Law Enforcement Officers =

African-American police organization in the USA

- Abbreviation: NABLEO
- Founded at: United States
- Type: African-American police organization
- Legal status: Active
- Purpose: Advocates for fairer policing and against police misconduct, abuse, and deadly force.
- Services: Advocacy, support for black law enforcement officers.
- Methods: Advocacy against police misconduct, advocating for policy changes, supporting officers who report racism.
- Fields: Law enforcement, civil rights, racial justice
- Members: approximately 9,000

The National Association of Black Law Enforcement Officers (NABLEO) is an African-American police organization in the United States which represents about 9,000 officers.

The organization advocates for fairer policing and against police misconduct, abuse and deadly force. It sees policing as organized to control poor people and minorities, and that police forces condone racism inside police forces, and need to address it by recruiting in locations where minorities go, hiring, training, supervision and policies, including incentives for officers to report racism by other officers. Racist officers endanger minority officers as well as the public. The organization says black officers fear retaliation for reporting racism by the police. It sees racial profiling even against uniformed officers.

The organization has defended black officers against punishment by the Fraternal Order of Police for supporting protesters against the police.
