= Elmer H. Fisher =

American architect

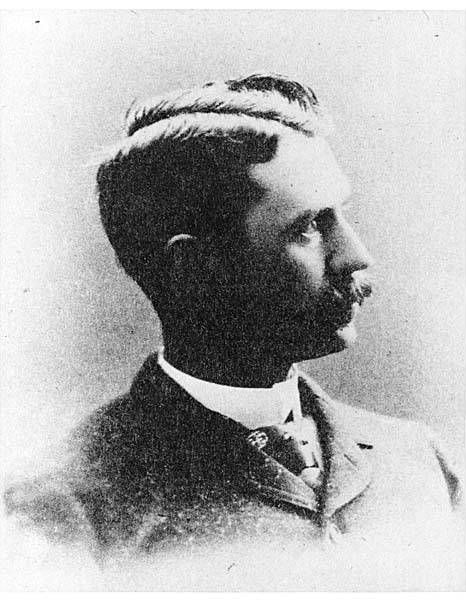
- San Francisco Journal of Commerce Publishing Co., 1890
- Born: c. 1840 in Scotland or c. 1851 in Royalston, Massachusetts, US
- Died: c. 1905; Los Angeles, California, United States
- Occupation: Architect
- Buildings: Pioneer Building; Austin A. Bell Building

Elmer H. Fisher (c. 1840 or c. 1851 – 1905) was an architect best known for his work during the rebuilding of the American city of Seattle after it was devastated by fire in 1889. He began his career as a carpenter and migrated from Massachusetts to the Pacific Northwest, starting his architectural career in Victoria, British Columbia in 1886 and eventually relocating to Seattle, where he practiced until 1891. After his reputation was damaged by litigation and personal scandal in Seattle, he moved to Los Angeles in 1893, where he only had modest success as an architect before returning to carpentry, dying around 1905 with his final years almost as mysterious as his early years; the details of his death and his burial location remain unknown. His commercial building designs played a major role in reshaping Seattle architecture in the late 19th century and many still survive as part of the Pioneer Square Historic District.

== Life ==
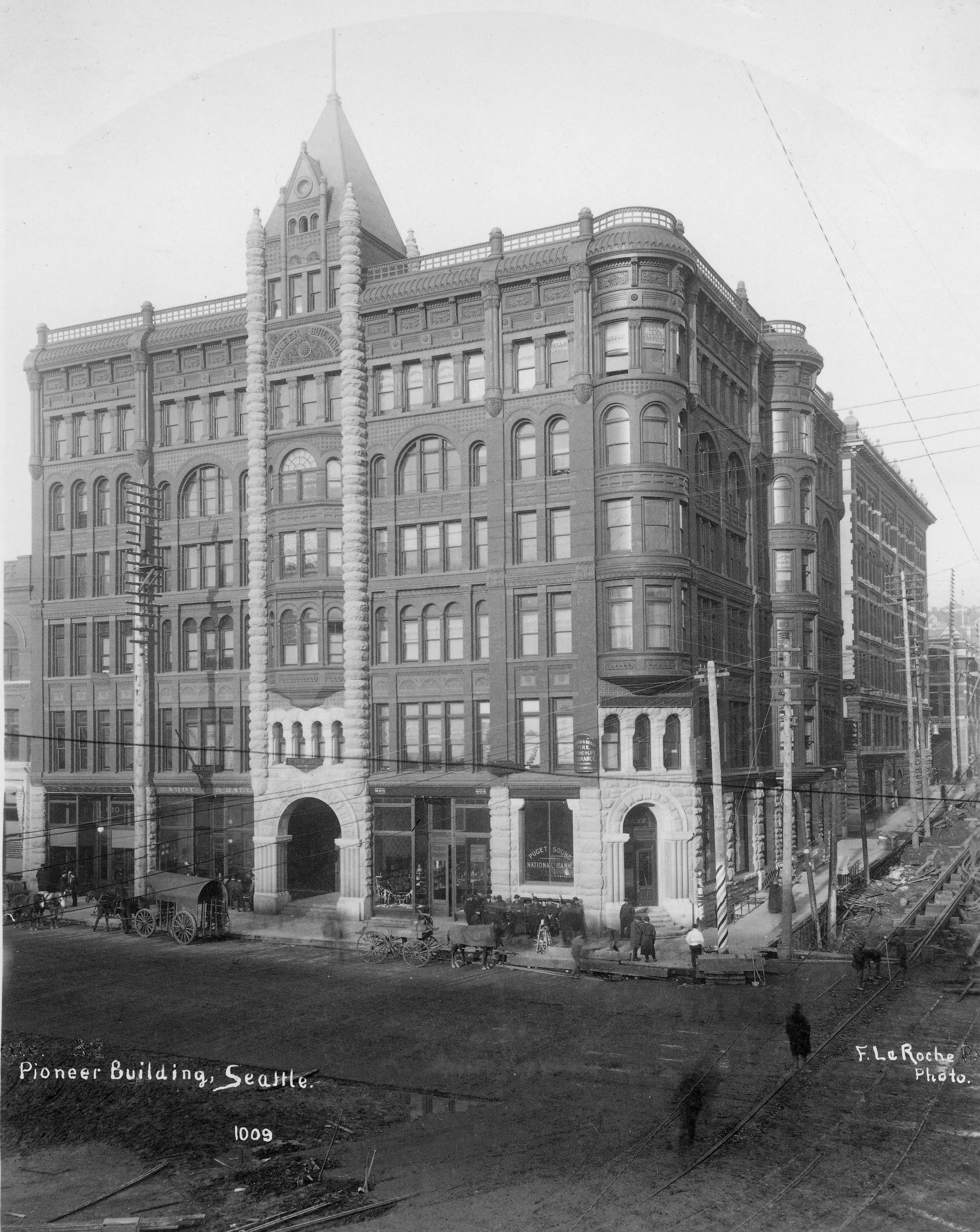
Fisher's Pioneer Building, shortly after its completion in 1890

Fisher claimed he was born in Edinburgh, Scotland, in 1840 and immigrated to Massachusetts at age 17 where he received an architectural apprenticeship in Worcester; this has yet to be substantiated by research and much conflicting information exists, most of it from coming from Fisher himself. (Note: According to Massachusetts State Birth records, an Elmer Fisher was born on August 6, 1851, near Royalston, Massachusetts, to parents Horace and Lucy Jane Fisher. This Elmer next appears in the 1865 Massachusetts State Census living with his family on a farm near Royalston, which confirms his father's birth place to also be Massachusetts and Elmer's middle initial to be "H", likely for "Horace". He appears in the 1870 United States census as a farm laborer living as a boarder in Orange, Massachusetts) In the 1870s he moved west to Minnesota, where he first appeared in the 1874 Minneapolis City Directory as a cabinet maker, the following year as a sash maker for R.P. Russell & Co., and the year after as a moulder for Smith, Parker & Co. He continued his journey west, arriving in Denver, Colorado, around 1880 (Note: By the time of the 1880 census, Elmer's given age was 36, a seven year discrepancy, and his parents' birth place had changed to Scotland, though his own birth place was still listed as Massachusetts) where after first working as a foreman for a sash & door factory, began trading as an architect as well as a carpenter and builder with partner J.H. Corrin until his departure from that city in 1885.

After a brief residency in Butte, Montana, Fisher arrived in the Pacific Northwest in early 1886 where he established an architectural office in Victoria, British Columbia. Business in the booming city was brisk and within a year he had multiple substantial business buildings and homes to his credit and began receiving commissions further afield in Vancouver, British Columbia, and Port Townsend, Washington. Around this time he received his first major commissions in Seattle including the first Korn Block (1888, Destroyed) and 1st Regiment Army Hall (1888, Demolished), giving him a foothold in the competitive architectural scene there. In early 1888 Fisher established two partnerships in order to balance his workload between Victoria and Seattle; one with George Clark in Seattle as Fisher & Clark and one with William Ridgeway Wilson in Victoria as Fisher & Wilson. With the growth and size of projects in Seattle greatly outpacing those in Victoria, Fisher decided to end his partnerships by the new year, and consolidated operations to his Seattle office where he began overseeing many large projects including the Austin A. Bell Building, the Gilmore & Kirkman Building and Henry Yesler's Pioneer Building. By early 1889 Fisher employed four draughtsmen at his James Street office (Note: Among these draughtsmen were Emil De Neuf, John C. Keith, Joseph L. Middlebrook and William Kauffman, most of whom later have successful practices of their own.) and was so busy that all small-scale and residential commissions were turned away.

While the first few months of 1889 were some of Fisher's busiest, he and every other hopeful architect in the city would be given a clean slate when the Great Seattle fire of June 6, 1889, wiped out the majority of the business district. Many of Fisher's recent commissions were either outside of the burnt district or were only in the excavation stages at the time of the fire and despite common belief, many of his most famous buildings would have been built whether Seattle burned or not. Regardless, new commissions in the wake of the fire were numerous to the degree that several pre-fire commissions were halted or left un-built due to the glut of new construction. He is still considered the most prolific of the architects involved in rebuilding the city for designing almost half of the major downtown buildings between 1889 and 1890.

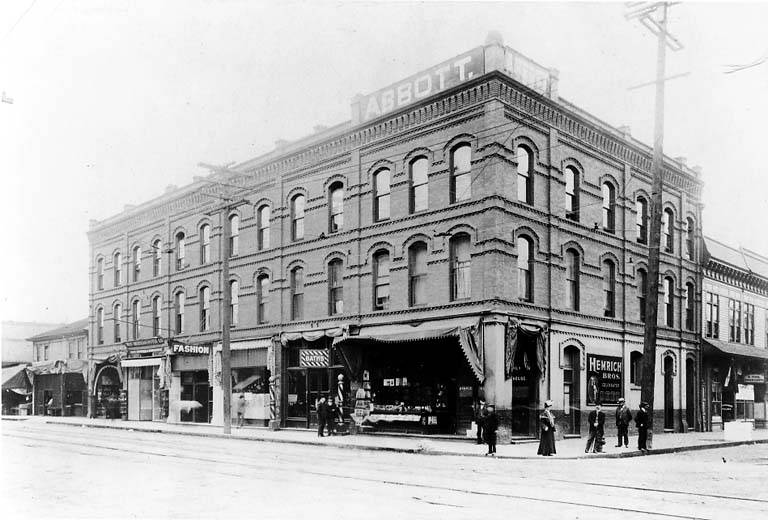
The Abbott Hotel at Pike and Third, designed and built by Fisher in 1890. He would spend his last years in Seattle as the hotel's manager.

Fisher began 1891 with an impressive list of buildings to his credit but large commissions became scarce as the economy began to cool. Besides finishing several buildings begun the previous year and repairing settling damage to an existing building, there were no new projects and Fisher turned to buying and selling real estate to supplement his income. Then in June 1891 Fisher was publicly accused of embezzlement by business associate and mill owner Fred Woodaman. Claiming to be owed a large amount by Fisher, Woodaman began spreading rumors that Fisher was cheating his creditors by transferring his properties to a friend's name and was even telling people that he had already skipped town. Other suits against Fisher soon followed. He countersued Woodaman in response for $15,000 for libel but the damage to his reputation and credit had already been done and his last classified ad as an architect appeared in Seattle newspapers on August 10, 1891. Only 2 days after his last ad as an architect, he was among those listed as being granted liquor licenses. Fisher spent the next year running the Abbott House Hotel at the Southeast corner of Pike Street and 3rd Avenue in a building that he had previously designed and built.

In early 1893, mere months after his marriage to Charlotte M. Willey (They would divorce by 1900), a former mistress that Fisher had traveled with from Colorado to Victoria brought a civil suit against him claiming to be his true wife. Although he was acquitted of any wrongdoing, the scandal ruined what was left of his reputation in Seattle. He had the contents of his home and office auctioned off and permanently removed to Los Angeles where he would form a new partnership with Carroll H. Brown. In Los Angeles he struggled to re-establish the career success he had enjoyed in Seattle, which had less to do with his reputation and more as a result of the Panic of 1893 which halted building projects across the nation. After a major commission for the Van Nuys Building in downtown Los Angeles fell through, his partnership with Brown was dissolved and he all but retired from architecture. After leading an unsuccessful 1897 expedition to Alaska during the Yukon Gold Rush, he returned to his first profession, carpentry, last appearing in the 1903 Los Angeles city Directory working as a construction superintendent for his former Seattle peer, John Parkinson who, unlike Fisher, had taken Los Angeles by storm upon his arrival a decade prior. He died around 1905 in relative obscurity. His official date of death as well as his final resting place is unknown.

== Work ==
Fisher's early commercial designs were of Victorian and Italianate influence and were typified by exposed brick with corbelling, selective exterior plastering and massive Aedicular window surrounds; motifs were reused to the extent that several buildings built between Victoria, Vancouver and Port Townsend in the mid-1880s were nearly identical. Romanesque elements heavily utilizing decorative terra cotta began to make their way into his designs by 1888 and would play a major role in his later work, such as the now demolished Burke block (1889–91), whose many elaborate terra cotta elements were incorporated into the public plaza surrounding the Henry M. Jackson Federal Building (1975).

On June 6, 1889, a fire destroyed most of Seattle's business district. The buildings were primarily constructed of wood so the large-scale rebuilding campaign focused on new "fireproof" buildings constructed of brick, stone and iron. Fisher designed many of the new buildings and some can still be seen in what is now the Pioneer Square neighborhood.

Fisher favored the Richardsonian Romanesque style which led to a unity of appearance in the district. He also tended to divide the facades of his buildings into a grid, a style influenced by Victorian architecture.

His best-known work is the Pioneer Building in Seattle. Designed and first proposed in 1888, It was completed in 1892 for Henry Yesler and it served as a "prestige office address" throughout the decade. It won an award from the American Institute of Architects for "being the finest building West of Chicago".

== Projects ==
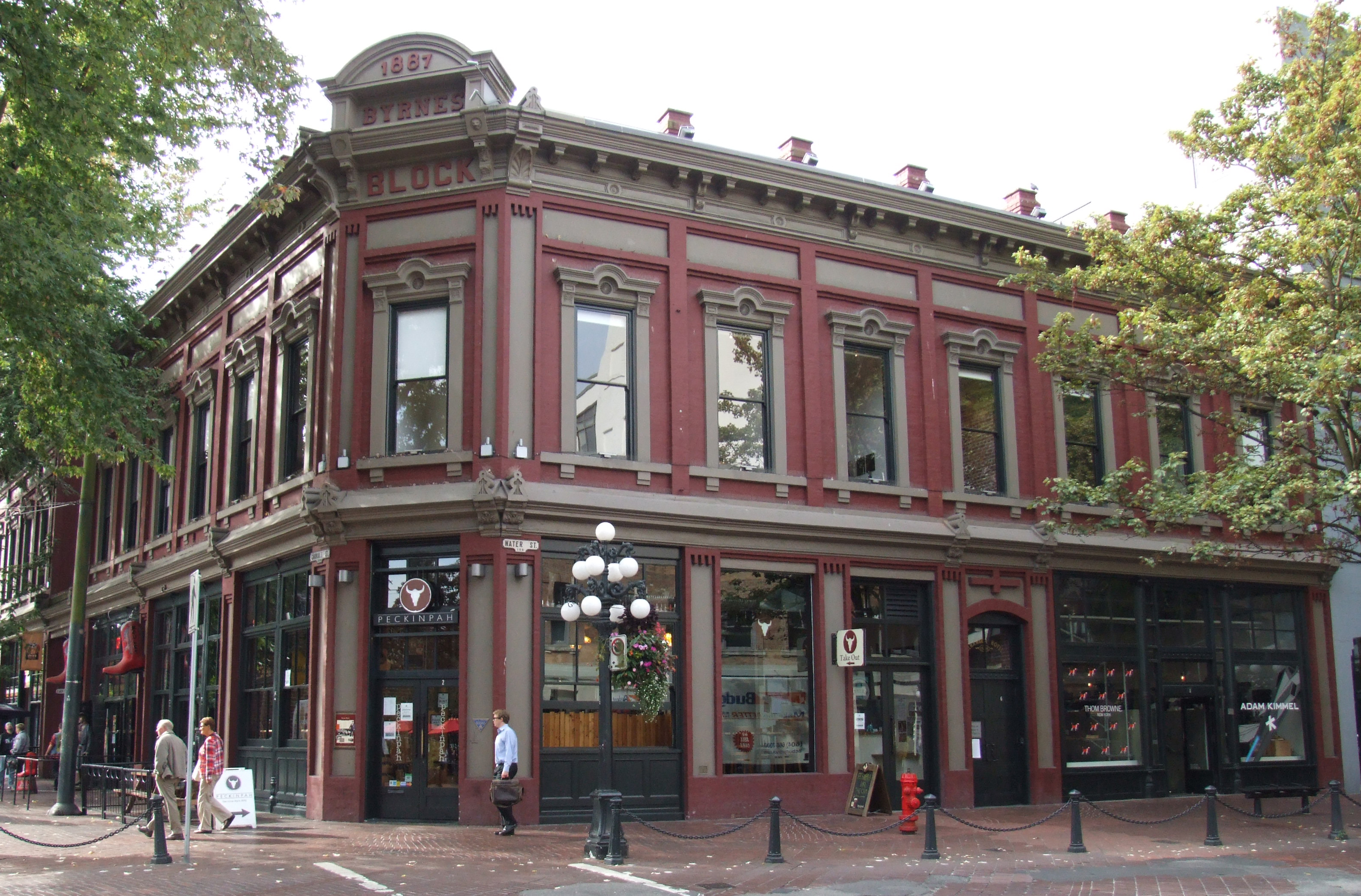
Byrnes Block in Vancouver BC, one of Fisher's earliest extant designs

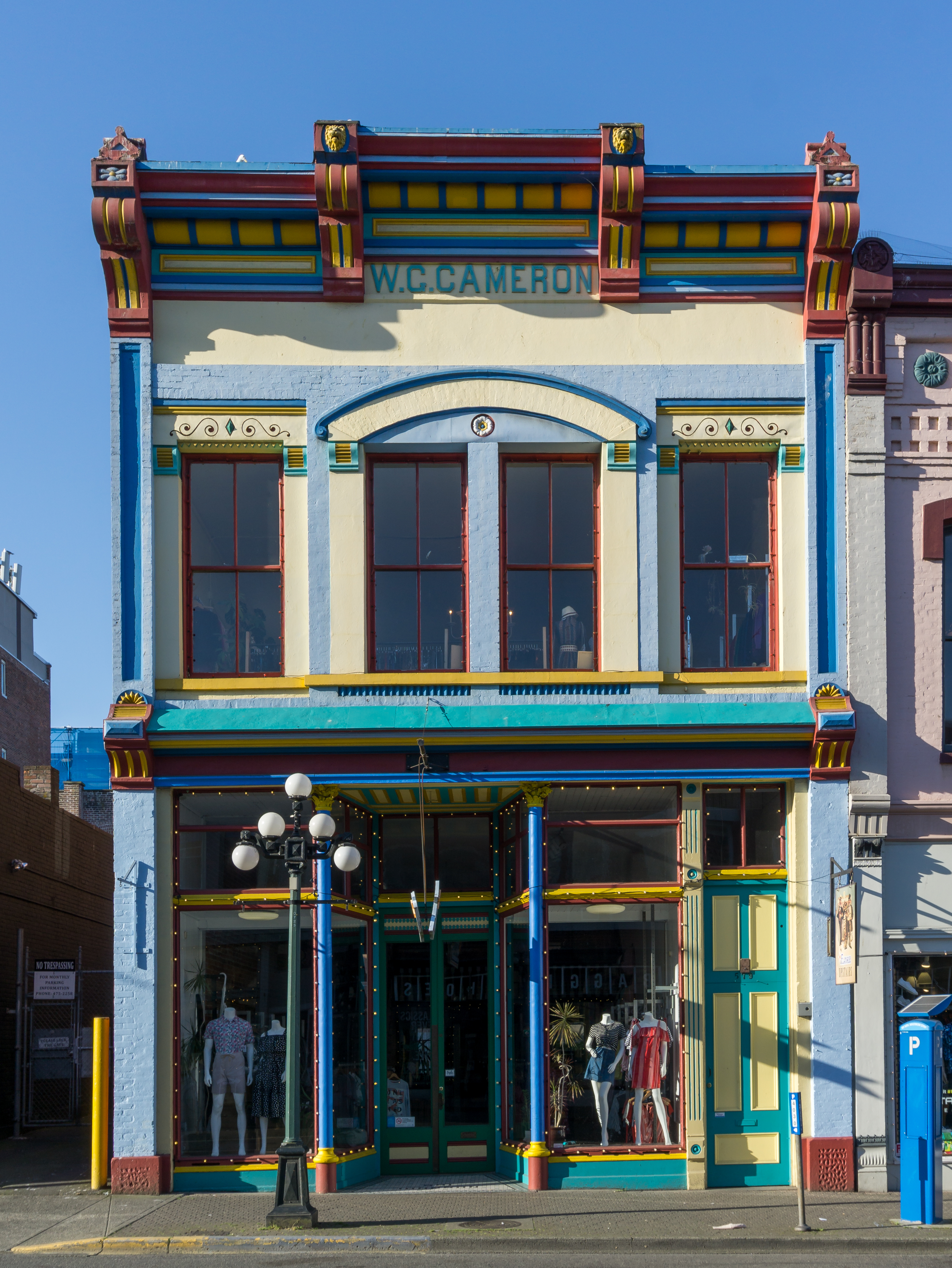
Cameron Building, Victoria, BC

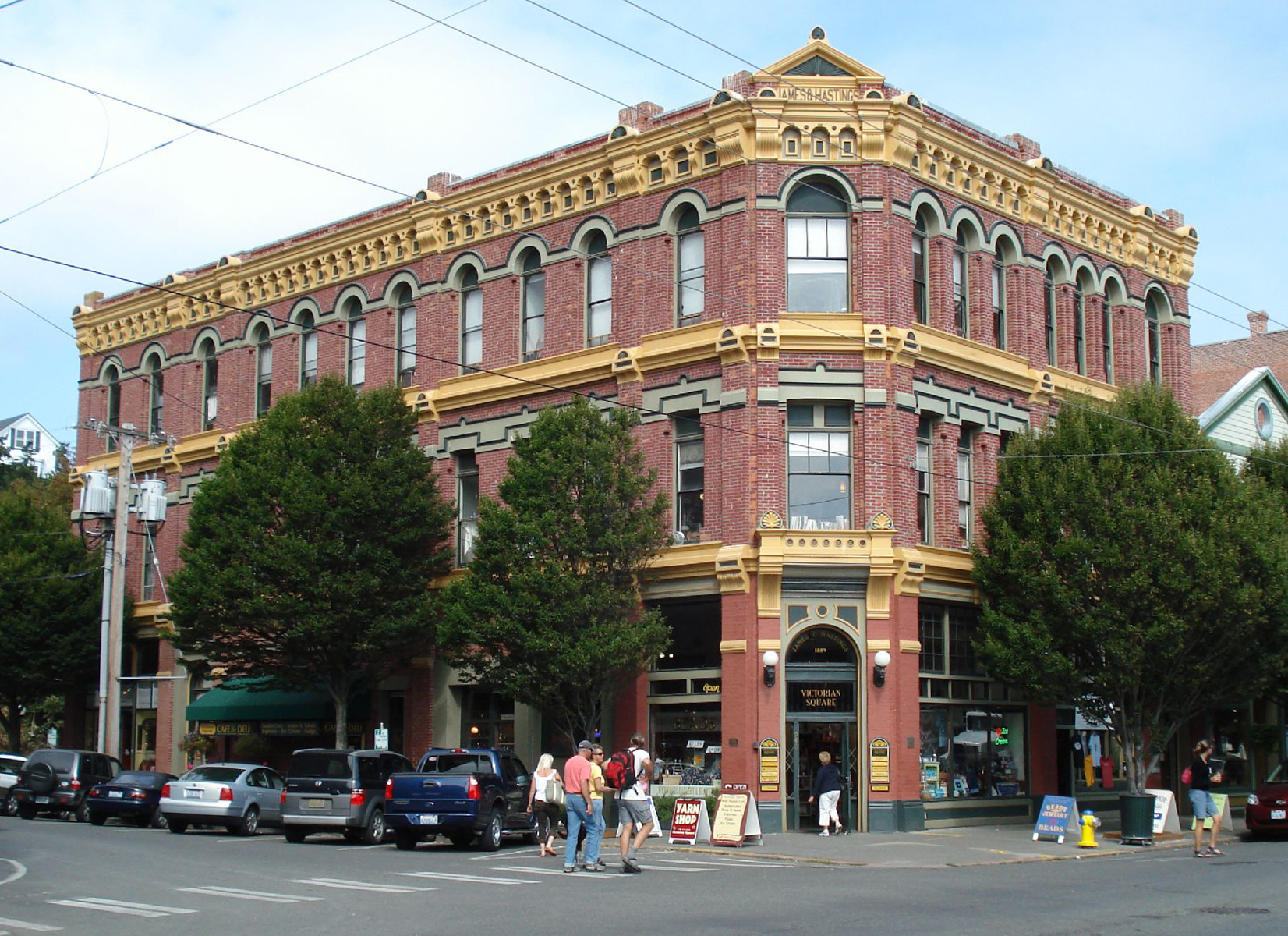
James & Hastings Building, Port Townsend

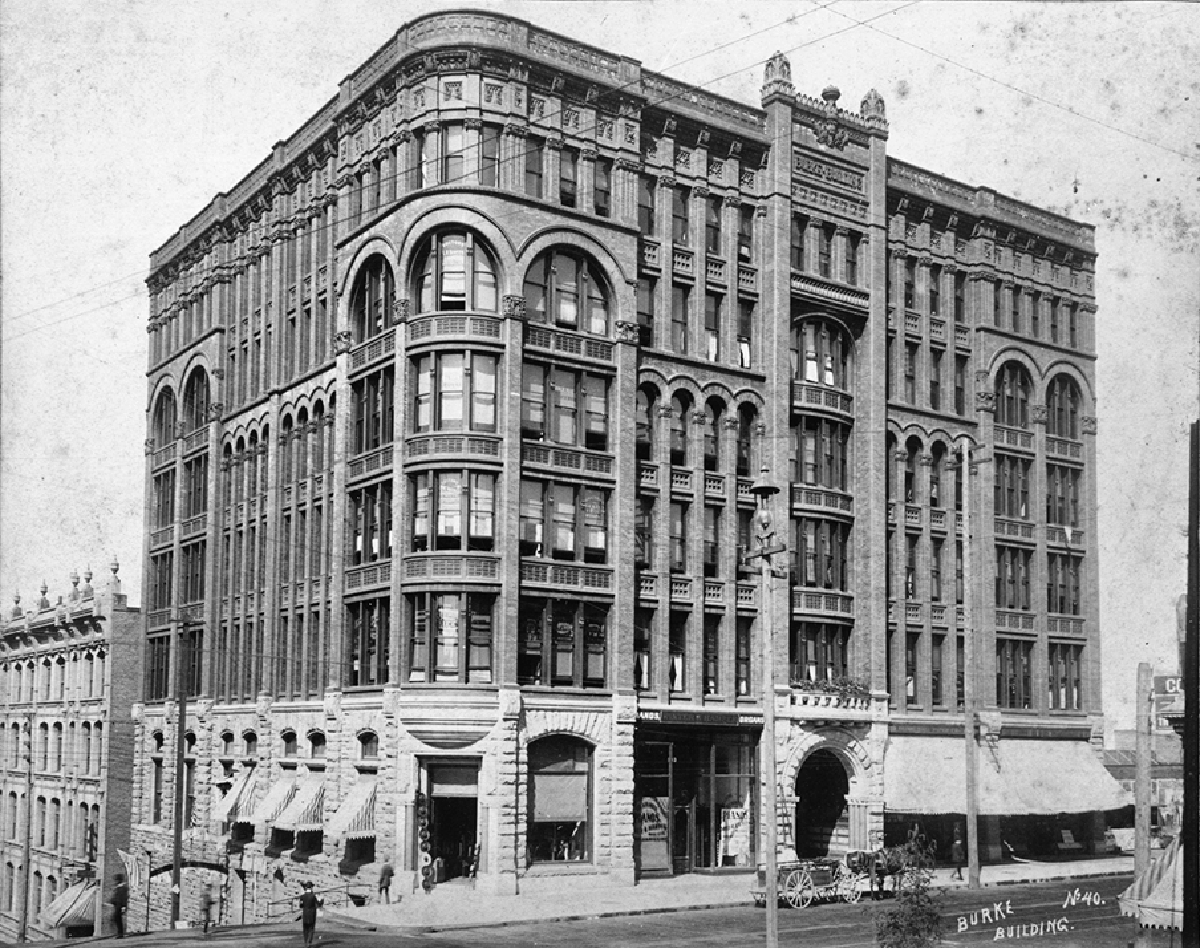
Burke Building, Seattle (Demolished)

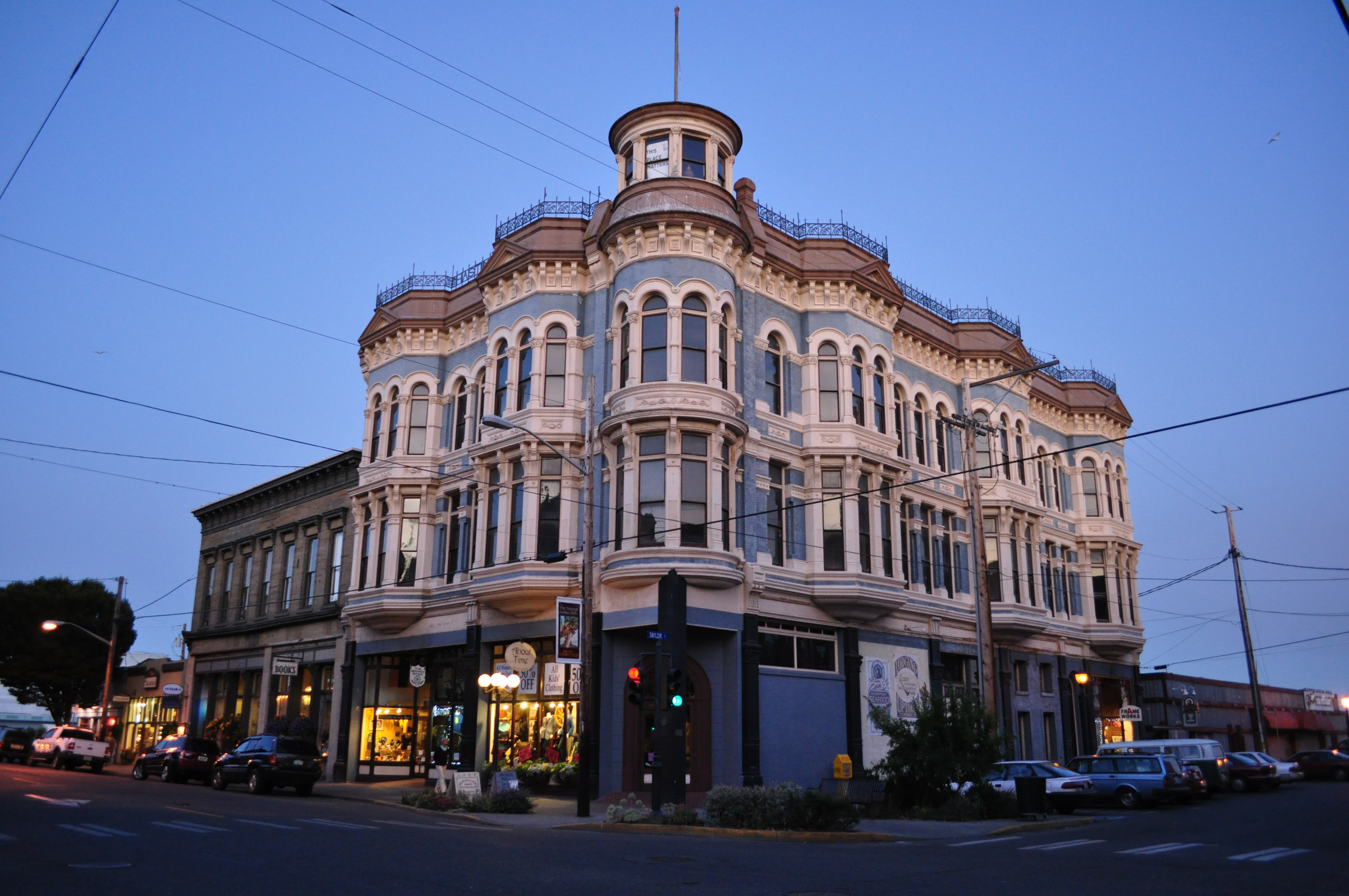
Hastings Building, Port Townsend

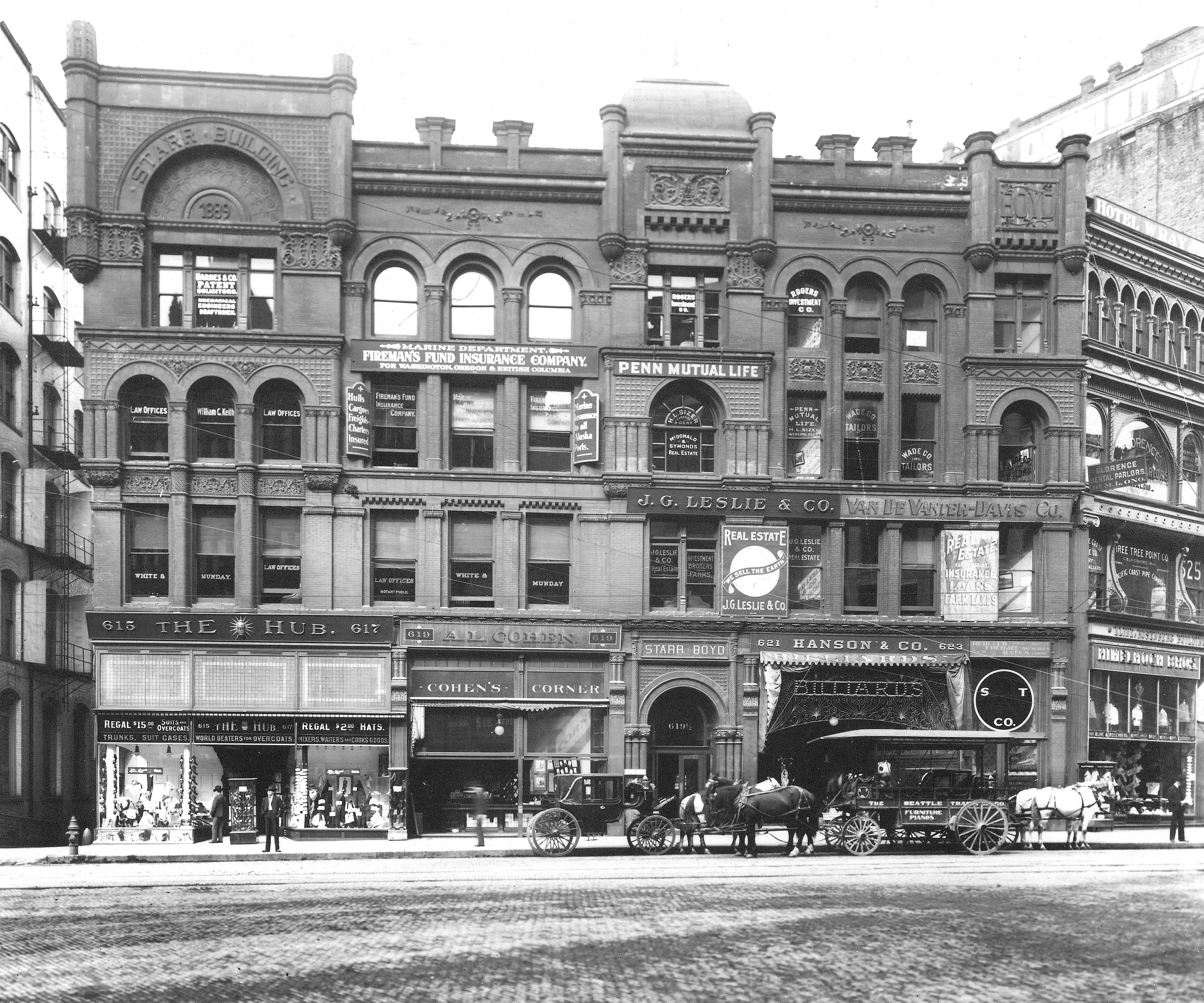
Starr-Boyd Building, Seattle (Demolished)

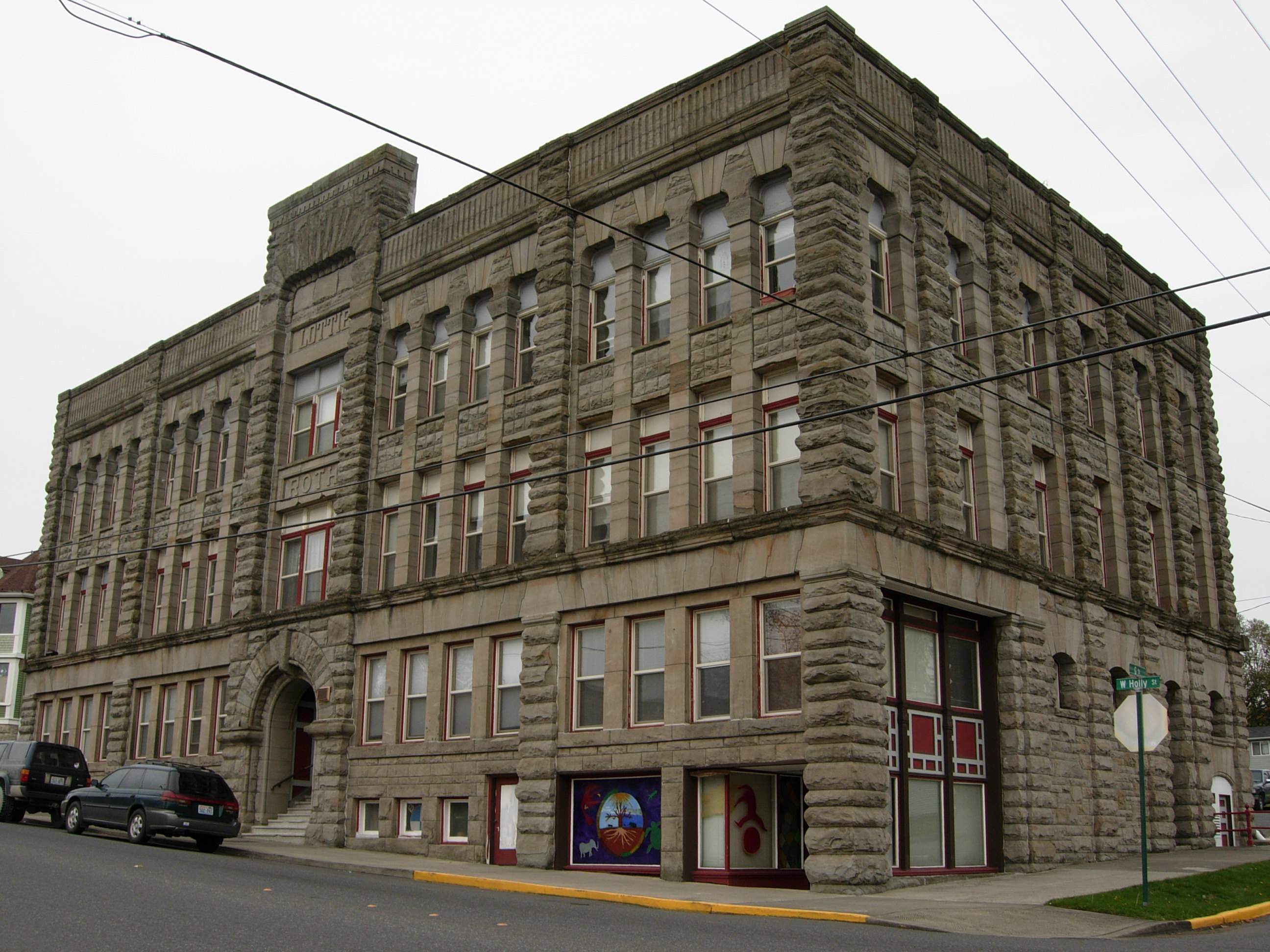
Lottie Roth Block, Bellingham

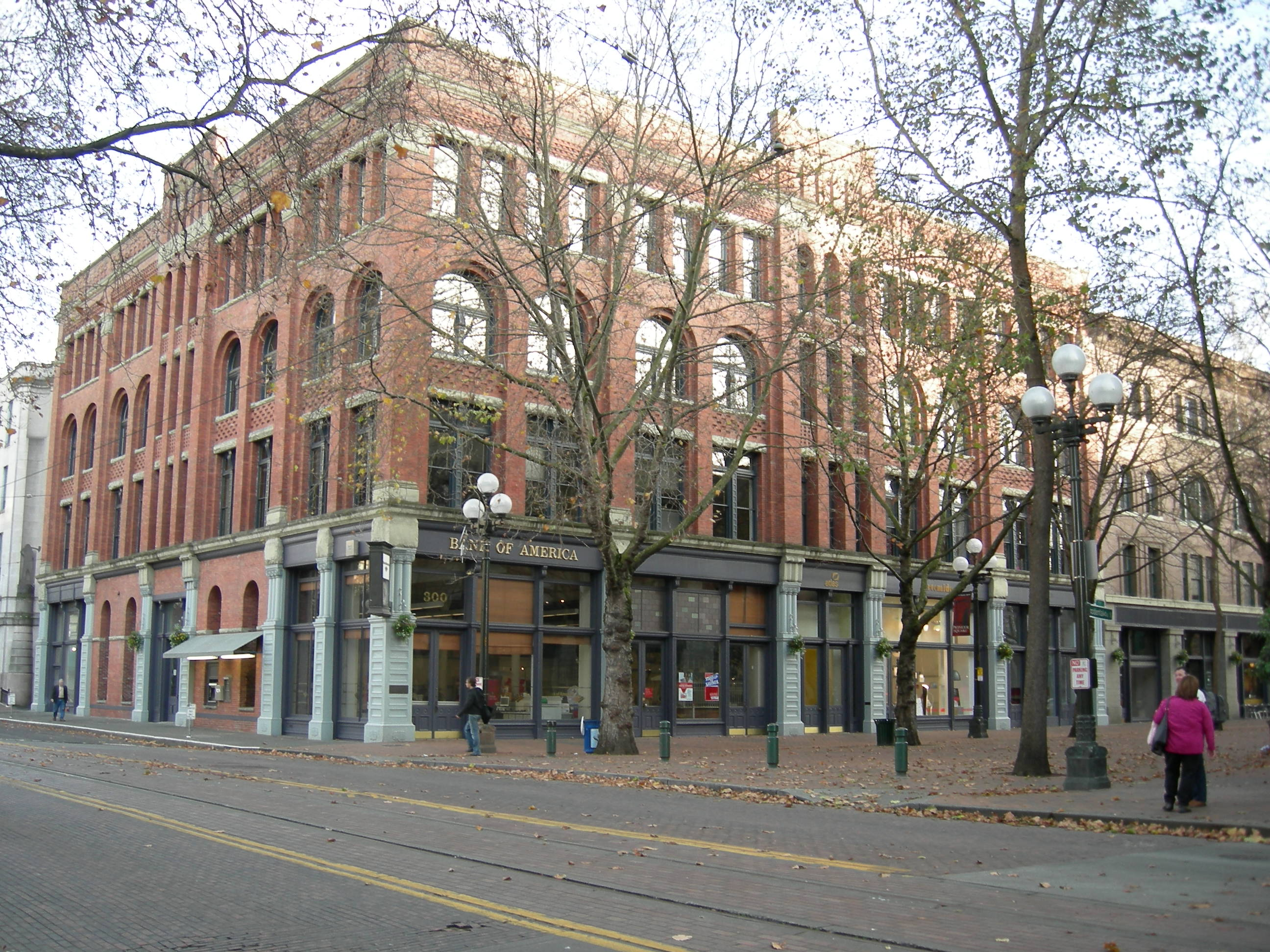
State Building, Seattle

=== Pre-Fire ===
- Spencer's Arcade (1886, Destroyed) - Government & Broad St, Victoria, BC
- Stelly Block [Clarence Hotel] (1886-7, Demolished) - Johnson & Blanshard St, Victoria, BC
- Denny Building (1886-7, Destroyed) - Broad St, Victoria, British Columbia
- Reid Residence (1886, Demolished?) - Esquimalt Road, Victoria, BC
- McCurdy Block (1887) - Water St & Taylor St, Port Townsend, WA
- Goldstream Hotel (1887, Destroyed) - Langford, BC
- 2 Houses for A.J. Langley (1887) - 1133 & 1141 Fort St, Victoria, BC
- Byrnes Block (1887) - Vancouver, British Columbia
- Willie Bakery (1887) - 537 Johnson St, Victoria, BC
- Seavy Block (1887, Destroyed) - Water St, Port Townsend, Washington
- Bank of British Columbia (1887, Destroyed) - Columbia & Mary St, New Westminster, British Columbia
- McLennan & McFeely Block (1887-8, Demolished) - 132 Cordova St, Vancouver, BC
- Pimbury Block (1887-8, Demolished) - Nanaimo, British Columbia
- Cameron Bldg (1888) - 581 Johnson St, Victoria, BC
- Young Building (White House) [New Facade] (1888, Demolished) - 67 Government St, Victoria, BC
- Sheam & Lee Building (1888) - 539-45 Fisgard St, Victoria, BC
- 4 Terrace Houses for A.A. Bell [Fisher & Clark] (1888, Demolished) - NW Corner of Bell St & 2nd Ave, Seattle, WA
- Craft & Norris Block (1888, Altered) - 95 Douglas St, Victoria, BC
- Armory Hall (1888, Destroyed) - Union Ave near 4th St, Seattle, WA
- Bow Block (1888, Destroyed) - 314 1st Ave S, Seattle, WA
- Korn Block (1888, Destroyed) - 119 Yesler Way, Seattle, WA
- James & Hastings Building [Fisher & Clark] (1888–89) - 940 Water St, Port Townsend, WA
- Pioneer Building [Fisher & Clark] (1889–91) - 600 1st Ave, Seattle, WA
- N.D. Hill Building (1889) - 635 Water St, Port Townsend, WA
- Hastings Building [Fisher & Clark] (1889) - 899 Water St, Port Townsend, WA
- Gilmore & Kirkman Building (1889–90, Destroyed) - 1225 1st Ave, Seattle, WA
- Y.M.C.A. Building (1889, only 1 floor built, demolished) - 1417 1st Ave Seattle, WA
- Denny Hotel [Fisher & Clark] (1889, Unbuilt) Denny Hill, Seattle, WA
- Scurry Terrace (1889, Demolished) - 3rd Ave & Cherry St, Seattle, WA
- Howard Lewis Residence (1889, Demolished) 10th Ave & James Street, Seattle, WA
- Burke's 'New York Building' (1889–90, Demolished) 2nd Ave & Marion Street, Seattle, WA
- Burke Building No.2 [The Burke] (1889, Demolished) 3rd Ave & Marion St, Seattle, WA
- Austin A. Bell Building (1889–90) - 2330 1st Ave, Seattle, Washington
- Sullivan Building (1889, Unbuilt) - NE corner Occidental Ave S & Main St, Seattle, WA
- Gatzert & McDonald Building (1889, Unbuilt) SE corner 1st Ave & Madison St, Seattle, WA
- Hull Building (1889) - 2405 1st Ave, Seattle, WA

=== Post-Fire ===
- Lowman & Hanford Building/Puget Sound Bank (1889, Demolished) 1st & Cherry, Seattle, WA (Note: Officially the first brick building completed after the fire, it was finished by August 1889 and was intended to be temporary, the two-story portion was replaced by the Lowman & Hanford Building in 1892 and the 1 story corner portion would stand until 1907, when the Lowman Building took its place.)
- Naher Terrace (1889, Demolished) - Yesler Way near 7th Ave, Seattle, WA
- Pease Building (1889, Demolished) - 1st Ave & Lenora St, Seattle, WA
- T. O'Brien Residence (1889, Demolished) - 9th Ave & King St, Seattle, WA
- J.L. Middlebrook Residence (1889, unknown) - Jackson Street Addition, Seattle, WA
- Seattle Times Building (1889, Demolished) - 113 Columbia St, Seattle, WA
- Methodist Protestant Church (1889–90, Demolished) - 3rd Ave & Pike St, Seattle, WA
- Trinity Episcopal Church (1889–90, Altered) - 8th Ave & James St, Seattle, WA
- Pease House [Hotel] (1889, Altered) - 2113 1st Ave, Seattle (Note: This was a 3-story wood frame building built for Mrs. M.D. Pease as a hotel, it has since lost its top two floors and now houses a Mud Bay pet store; no traces of Fisher's design remain.)
- Haller Block (1889–90, Destroyed) - 801 2nd Ave, Seattle, WA
- Starr-Boyd Bldg (1889–90, Destroyed) - 621 1st Ave, Seattle, WA
- Schwabacher Building (1889–90, altered) - 1st Ave S & Yesler Way, Seattle, WA
- Rengstorff Building (1889–90, Destroyed) - 815 2nd Ave, Seattle, WA
- New England Hotel (1889–90, Altered) - 219 1st Ave S, Seattle, WA
- Korn Block (1889–90) - 119 Yesler Way, Seattle, WA
- Feurer Building (1889–90, 1 floor of original design built (Note: This building comprises the western 30' of the current Mutual Life Building, completed in 1905 and would have supposedly followed the same intended design had Fisher's been carried through.)) - 92 Yesler Way, Seattle, WA
- Douthitt Building (1889–90, Demolished) - 2nd Ave north of Columbia, Seattle, WA
- Washington Building (1889–90, Destroyed) - 700 Block 1st Ave, Seattle, WA
- Sullivan Building (1889–91, Destroyed) - 714 1st Ave, Seattle, WA
- Scurry Residence (1890, Demolished) - 11th Ave & James St, Seattle, WA
- Fisher Building (1889–90, Demolished) - 3rd Ave & Pike St, Seattle, WA
- Bank of Commerce (1889–90) - 1st Ave & Yesler Way, Seattle, WA
- Yesler Building [Mutual Life Building] (1889–90, 1 floor of original design built) - 605 1st Ave, Seattle, WA
- E.H. Fisher Residence (1890–91, status unknown) - West of Yakima, WA
- Lottie Roth Block (1890–91) - W Holly St at G St, Bellingham, WA
- State Building (1890–91) - 300 Occidental Ave S, Seattle, WA
- Semi-Detached House at Washington St & 11th (now 10th) Ave (1890, Demolished) - Seattle, WA
- George & Nugent Building (1890, Demolished) - 211 S Washington St, Seattle
- J.W. George Building [Lebanon Building/Tourist Hotel] (1890–91, Destroyed) - 224 Occidental Ave S, Seattle, WA

=== Brown & Fisher, Los Angeles ===
- Griffith Block (1894, Demolished) - Azusa Ave, Azusa, CA
- 2 Houses for John Wallenslager (1894, possibly still standing) - W 17th & Toberman St, Los Angeles, CA
- Geo S. Gregson Residence (1894-5, status unknown) - Harper Tract, Los Angeles, CA
- 2 story building for J.W. Hinton (1894, status unknown) - Santee St, Los Angeles, CA
- Cottage for Emerson (1895, status unknown) - near Pico St, Los Angeles, CA
- D.A. Crichton Residence (1895, Demolished) - Flower St, near 15th, Los Angeles, CA
- Van Nuys Building (1895, unbuilt) - 4th & Main St, Los Angeles, CA
- Meek's Bakery Co. (1896, Demolished) - 6th & San Pedro St, Los Angeles, CA
