= Mutual Life Building (Seattle) =

- U.S. Historic district – Contributing property
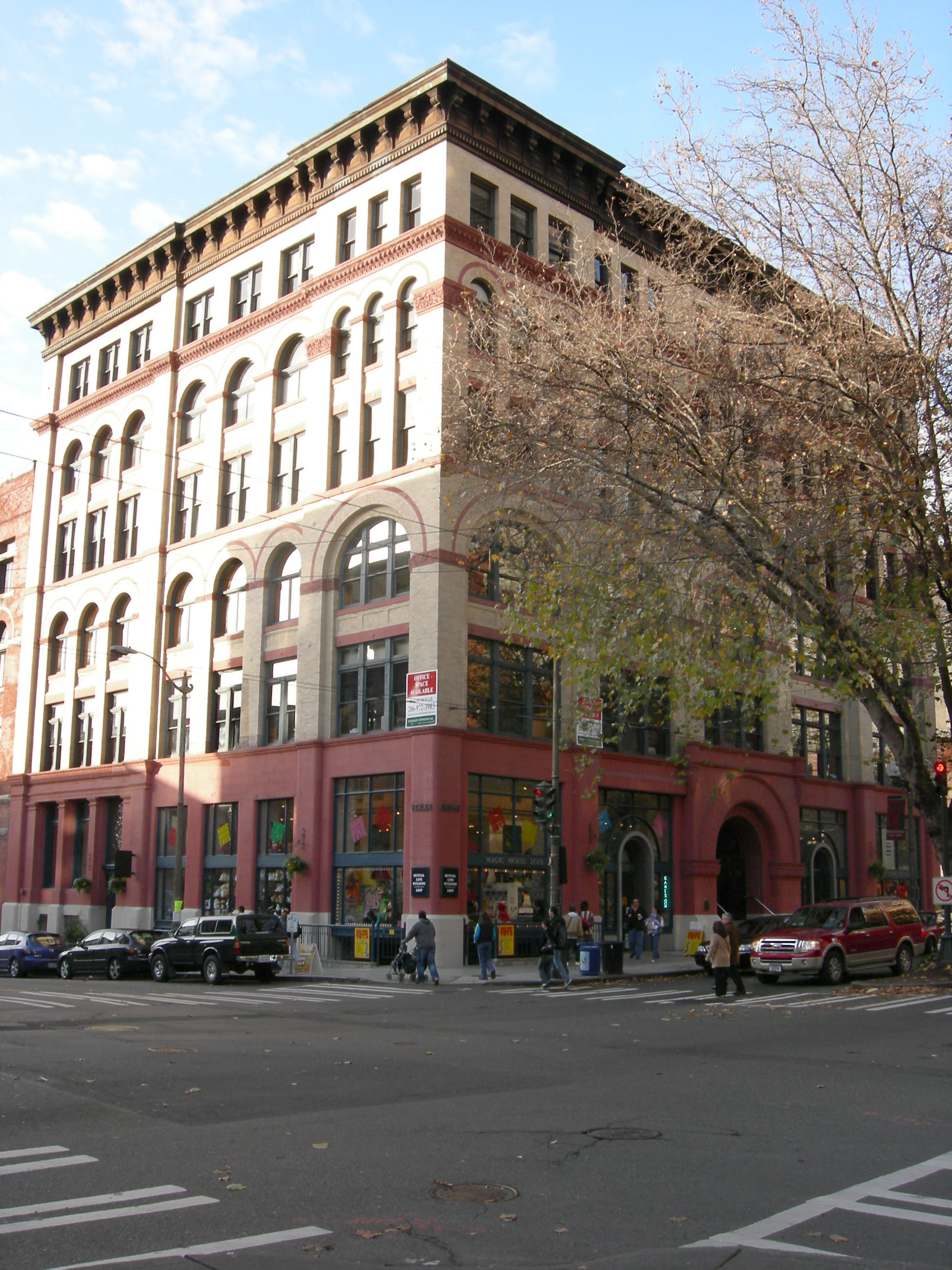
- The building's exterior, 2007

- Location within Downtown Seattle Location within Washington (state)
- Location: 605 1st Ave; Seattle, Washington
- Coordinates: 47°35′59.36″N 122°19′59.93″W
- Built: 1890, 1892, 1896 & 1904-5
- Architect: Elmer H. Fisher (1890); Emil De Neuf (1892); Clinton and Russell; William E. Boone (Supt.) (1896); James Blackwell (1904)
- Architectural style: Romanesque Revival
- Part of: Pioneer Square Historic District (ID70000086)
- Designated CP: June 22, 1970

The Mutual Life Building, originally known as the Yesler Building, is an historic office building located in Seattle's Pioneer Square neighborhood that anchors the West side of the square. The building sits on one of the most historic sites in the city; the original location of Henry Yesler's cookhouse that served his sawmill in the early 1850s and was one of Seattle's first community gathering spaces. It was also the site of the first sermon delivered and first lawsuit tried in King County. By the late 1880s Yesler had replaced the old shanties with several substantial brick buildings including the grand Yesler-Leary Building, which would all be destroyed by the Great Seattle Fire in 1889. The realignment of First Avenue to reconcile Seattle's clashing street grids immediately after the fire would split Yesler's corner into two pieces; the severed eastern corner would become part of Pioneer Square park, and on the western lot Yesler would begin construction of his eponymous block in 1890 to house the First National Bank, which had previously been located in the Yesler-Leary Building. Portland brewer Louis Feurer began construction of a conjoined building to the west of Yesler's at the same time. Progress of both would be stunted and the original plans of architect Elmer H. Fisher were dropped by the time construction resumed in 1892. It would take 4 phases and 4 different architects before the building reached its final form in 1905. The Mutual Life Insurance Company of New York only owned the building from 1896 to 1909, but it would retain their name even after the company moved out in 1916.

Though well maintained as an office building into the 1940s under the ownership of the Shafer Brothers, by the 1950s the building was largely vacant and deteriorating, becoming a poster child of the blight facing the Pioneer Square neighborhood and in the early 1960s was recognized as one of the most historically significant buildings on the square. The building became the birthplace of Seattle's historic preservation movement and was listed on the National Register of Historic Places in 1970 as a contributing property in the Pioneer Square Historic District but was not fully restored until the early 1980s, which returned its use to office space.

== History ==
=== Henry Yesler ===
In the wake of the Great Seattle Fire, the city took the opportunity to widen, raise and realign many downtown streets to reconcile the converging grids that met at Yesler Way which they had been attempting to fix for years. Yesler's property at 3 of the 4 corners of 1st and Yesler had stood in the way of these changes, and Yesler, being the frugal and stubborn man he was refused to surrender an inch of right of way. To firmly cement his property lines in 1883 he had one of Seattle's grandest buildings built on the corner that the city wanted to cut through, the Yesler-Leary Building. Designed by William E. Boone, the region's most prominent architect at the time, it was modeled after the triangular Phelan Building in San Francisco. The First National Bank, later known as Seafirst Bank, opened in the corner and the building soon became a busy gathering place.

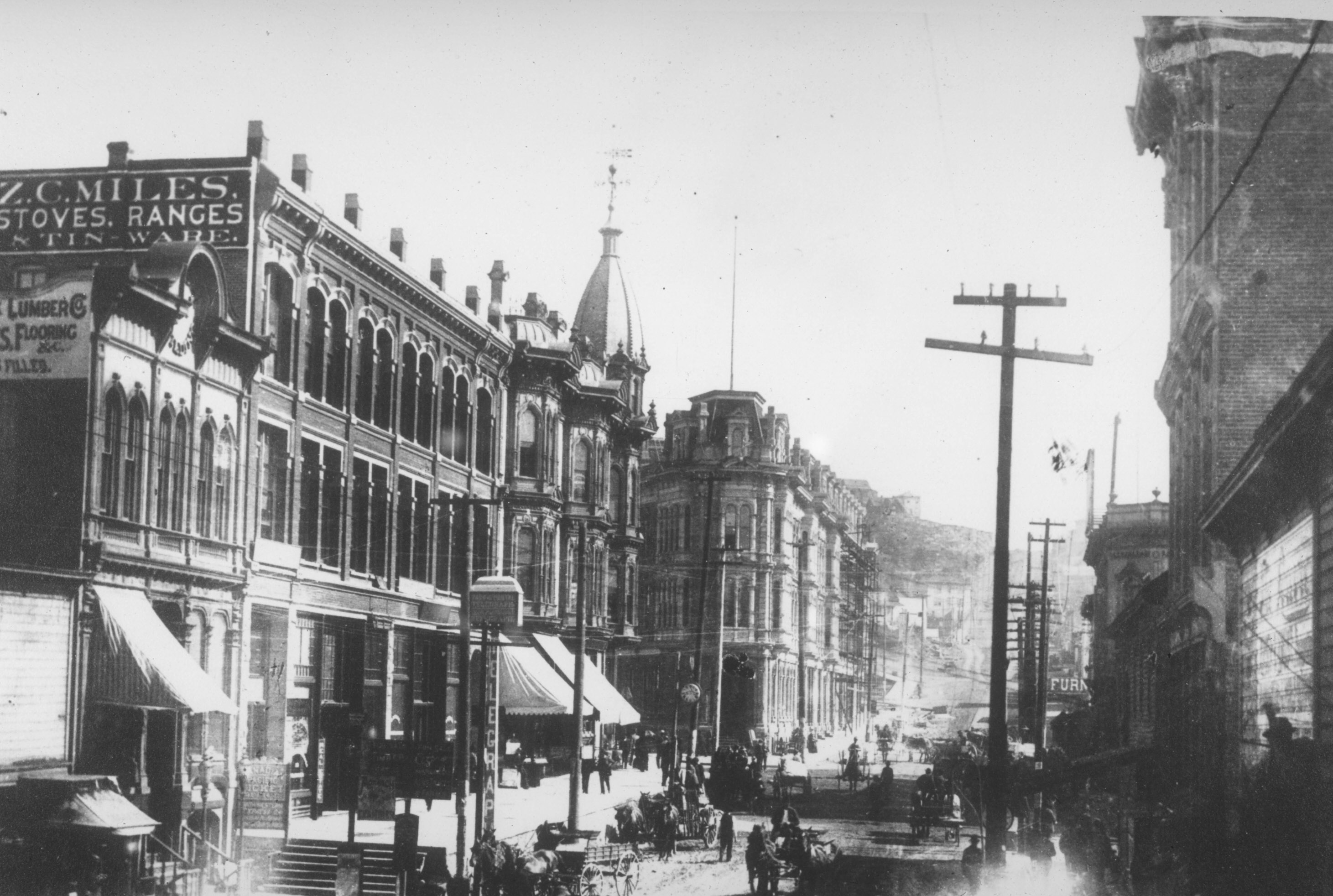
Looking East on Yesler Way c.1888-9. The Mutual life Building would occupy the site of the two buildings on the left.

Not long after the Yesler-Leary Building was completed an even larger 4-story annex of the same architecture with a central tower was proposed to fill the lot to the West between it and the Post Building, but these plans were shelved when Seattle's economy turned sour towards the end of 1884. (Note: These plans were apparently so certain, that the building was already depicted as complete and occupied on the July 1884 Sanborn map, though only at 3 floors.) A more conservative in style building known simply as the New Yesler Block (and also designed by Boone) would be built on the lot in 1888 but its life would be short lived. It is within the footprint of this building that the Mutual Life Building would eventually stand.

Yesler finally agreed to sell his corner lot to the city and in order to remove the jog separating Front Street (1st Avenue) and Commercial Street (1st Avenue South), the street was cut through Yesler's corner, creating Pioneer Square Park and leaving him with a roughly rectangular corner parcel where most of the New Yesler Block had been. The Western 30 feet of that lot, which Yesler had sold to John Leary in 1881 for construction of the original Post Building, had been purchased by German native and Portland, Oregon brewer Louis Feurer (Note: Feurer was president of the Gambrinus Brewing Company, one of the largest breweries in the Northwest at the time, once located east of downtown Portland between W Burnside St & NW Westover Road; In Seattle he would invest in more real estate in Belltown and Lake Union, but would spend most of his time in lawsuits with the city over various damages to his property. After selling his brewery and his unfinished building, he retired to Seattle, where he died in 1907 at age 64.) shortly after the fire for $35,000, who with Yesler would build their separate buildings with a unified appearance. About a year after the fire, after the dust had settled from regrades and widening, the two men began construction of their office buildings that would serve as the new home of the First National Bank as well as the Washington Savings Bank (No relation to Washington Mutual Savings). Yesler and Feurer both chose architect Elmer H. Fisher, who had designed for the latter the Pioneer Building and Bank of Commerce Buildings on neighboring corners of the square. In Fisher's original design Yesler's 6-story building and Feurer's 3-story building were to be clad in rusticated Salt Lake red sandstone, and would be the only buildings of their kind in the city. Feurer filed a permit for construction of his building in November 1889. Begun in late summer of 1890, construction proceeded slowly on Yesler's portion and a temporary roof was put over the completed first floor and basement as soon as it was fit for occupancy, with Feurer following suit. Despite reports at the time, the entire building would not be built at once, and not to the design originally proposed.

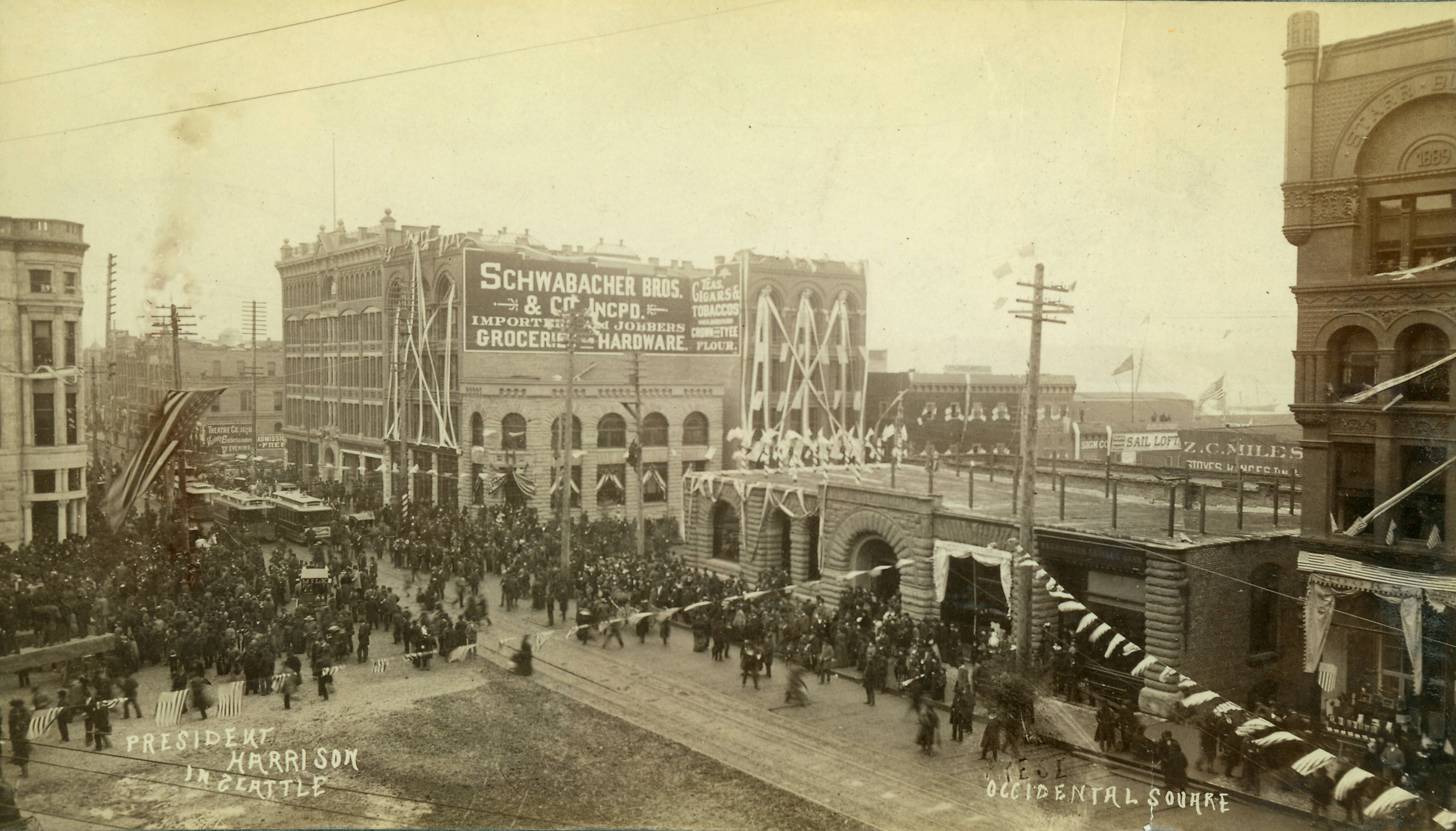
The Yesler Block in 1891, showing all that would be built of Elmer Fisher's original design.

By the time construction of the building recommenced in the summer of 1892, Fisher had suffered a series of legal and financial setbacks and was no longer practicing architecture. Emil De Neuf, former head draftsmen and now successor to Fisher, was retained by Yesler to draft a new design for the top 5 floors, to bring it more up to date; The upper floors would now be faced with buff pressed brick and only trimmed with red sandstone (this time sourced from Portage, Wisconsin) to unify it with the base. The interiors were to be lavishly decorated in marble, mahogany, Spanish cedar, glazed tile and the most modern plumbing system in the city, ultimately making it more expensive than the original design. Wilmot, Middlebrook & Davis were awarded the $35,000 general contract for this next phase of construction which initially only covered the second and third floors before work would pause again. That September it was announced that instead of just adding the two floors and stopping again, the building would be completed to its full 6 story design at once. This expansion however, would not include Louis Feurer's portion of the building at 92 Yesler Way, then occupied by Hamm & Schmitz's Seattle Saloon; this part of the building would remain single-storied and under Feurer's ownership for another decade.

Henry Yesler died in December 1892, within days of the completion of the building's structure, but it had yet to be furnished on the inside. Plastering and woodwork would be postponed until Yesler's estate could be sorted out and the first upstairs tenant, The Washington Club, wouldn't move in until the following September.

=== 1896–1909: The Mutual Life Insurance Company ===
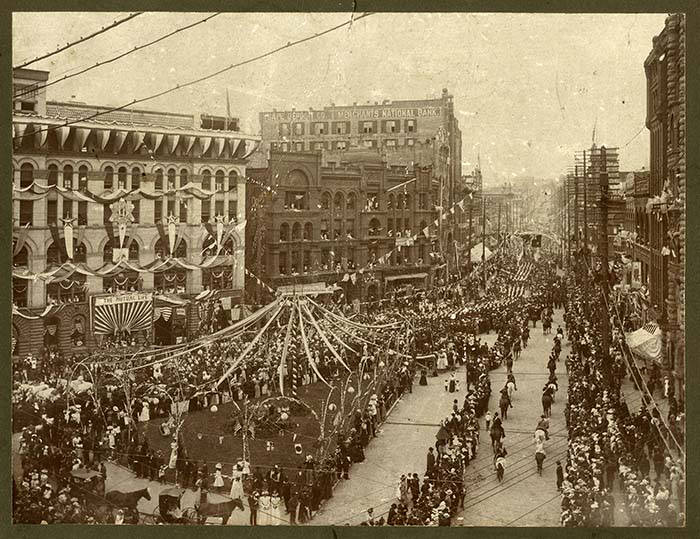
July 4, 1898, a rare glimpse of the building's De Neuf roofline. Scaffolding for the new cornice (covered in banners) can be seen just underneath.

After almost three years of tumultuous legal battles over Henry Yesler's estate were finally settled, the first order of business was to auction off his many Seattle properties, which began in July 1895. Of these, the Yesler Building garnered the most interest from buyers. Although all sales from the estate were required to be public, it was largely understood that the Mutual Life Insurance Company of New York would be the highest bidder, and they won the building for $130,000. The Mutual Life Insurance Company, which had been established in New York in 1843, opened their Seattle branch in 1890 with Fred L. Stinson as agent. First located in the Safe Deposit Building at the foot of Cherry Street, they moved to the Bailey (now Broderick) Building about a year before purchasing the Yesler Building. Sherwood Gillespy, recently installed as Mutual Life's agent overseeing the entire Northwest region, moved his offices into the building in early January 1896 at which time the building officially became known as the Mutual Life Building. That July they hired prominent local architect William E. Boone, who at that point had mostly set his practice aside to focus on civic affairs, to supervise alterations to the building and completion of the top 3 floors. Their first major change to the building would be replacing the stone relief above the main entrance arch that once said "Yesler Building" with their own name. (Note: Besides the Mutual Life Insurance Company, which occupied most of the building's second floor, the upper floors were fully occupied by attorneys, doctors, dentists, brokers and insurance agents. The Washington Savings Bank left its space at 106 1st Ave early on and was replaced by the local ticket office for the Canadian Pacific Railway.) The redesign, prepared by the prominent New York firm of Clinton and Russell (Note: Clinton & Russell, who had also designed a massive annex for Mutual Life's Manhattan headquarters, employed a young Abraham H. Albertson during this period, who would later go on to design many important commercial buildings in Washington State in the 1910s and 1920s.) would give the building its current projecting copper cornice, not originally envisioned by Fisher or De Neuf; this work would be completed by the end of 1898.

In July 1902, Mutual Life purchased Louis Feurer's 1-story building at 92 Yesler way for $50,000 with aims to expand the Mutual Life Building's floor space. On June 18, 1904, under the direction of agent Gillespy, work began on adding floors to the Feurer Building to bring it up to its neighbor's height. (Note: The 1904 Sanborn map shows a vacant lot at the site of the Feurer Building, suggesting it was demolished completely for the expansion.) This final phase was designed to blend in seamlessly with the existing façade but would be built using "absolutely fireproof" steel frame construction that as well as serving as a structural anchor to the rest of the building could support up to 3 additional floors if the need arose. As Emil De Neuf was reducing his practice in the city, Gillespy turned to architect James E. Blackwell, who happened to be a tenant in the building. The Gribble & Skene Company were awarded the $80,000 general contract, which would eventually inflate to over $120,000. During this addition the entire ground floor underwent a modernization which saw the heavily rusticated sandstone of the building's ground floor shaved down and smoothed.

=== 1909–1955: The Shafer Brothers ===
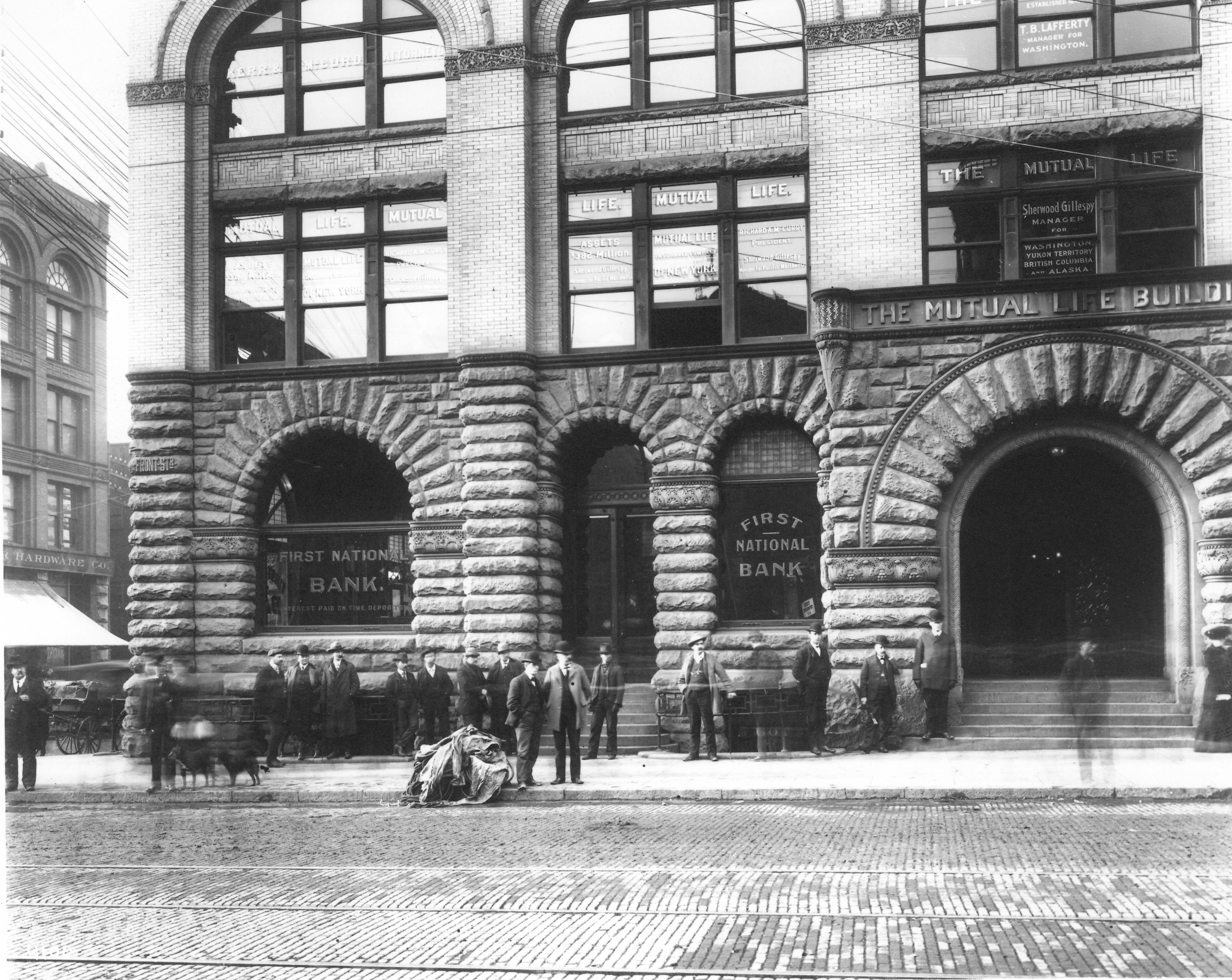
The First National Bank in 1903, prior to a remodeling that would smooth away most of the textured stone. In Elmer Fisher's original design the entire building would have been clad in this manner.

Following a 1907 law passed in New York State as a result of the Armstrong Investigation that prohibited insurance companies based in that state from owning property, Mutual Life put the building up for sale through Henry Broderick. It was sold in 1909 to the Shafer Brothers for $350,000 in what was seen as one of the most lucrative sales in recent history. The Shafer Brothers, Issie and Julius, were clothing merchants by trade who had made their fortune outfitting miners during the Klondike Gold Rush (Note: The Shafer Brothers, Austrian immigrants, came to Seattle in 1890 and opened their clothing store in 1902 at 2nd and University St in the Arcade Building and would begin purchasing real estate by 1906, before forming their own land company, which would erect the landmark Shafer Building at 6th and Pine in 1923.) and purchased the Mutual Life Building as a permanent investment, one of many Seattle buildings and properties they would eventually own as the Shafer Land Company. They established an office on the 4th floor and would maintain the building as first class office space for over 40 years. Mutual Life would retain a lease in the building for another decade before eventually moving uptown to the Stuart Building in the Metropolitan Tract in 1916 and later the 1411 4th Avenue Building.

In May 1910, ground floor anchor tenant the First National Bank moved across Pioneer Square to larger quarters in the Pioneer Building. The space was next occupied by the State Bank of Seattle which would themselves move to larger uptown quarters in August 1914; it would be the last bank to leave the square, which at one time had one on nearly every corner. While the building remained mostly intact architecturally, The ground floor would be remodeled multiple times over the next several decades, updating and widening storefronts and removing most of the arches from the former banking space.

On December 15, 1916, realtor Alexander Millar was found dead by a gunshot wound in his 5th floor office. First thought to be suicide, the killer, Tucson, Arizona miner Herbert Stokes, turned himself and the murder weapon into police almost immediately (before the police chief could even finish reading out the report) claiming that he felt Millar was swindling him. The two men had gone into a partnership on a patent for a telephone directory advertisement index and Millar would be in charge of payouts, which were not forthcoming. After several warnings, Stokes stormed into Millar's office brandishing his revolver and demanding his papers for the patent back and after being brushed off, shot the unarmed Millar dead in his chair. He would later be charged with manslaughter. On May 10, 1917, another man, broker Max Freed, was found dead by a gunshot wound in his office; this time it was determined to be a suicide.

During World War I, the Mutual Life Building was home to the United States Army recruiting office headquarters on the 5th floor, where victory pins and medals would be awarded to those who presented their discharge papers. The building would remain mostly occupied throughout the 1920s by various brokers, unions, stevedore firms and shipping companies but like many others would struggle with vacancies during the Great Depression. The Shafer Brothers would advertise in the newspapers frequently offering slashed rental rates as low as $1 per square foot but demand for office space on skid row would not improve after World War II, at least not for reputable businesses.

=== 1955–present: Decline and revival ===
In October 1955, the Mutual Life Building was purchased from the Shafer Brothers Land Company by Seattle dentist and real estate investor Dr. Sidney T. Magnuson for an undisclosed price. Henry Broderick, Inc, who had brokered the sale of the building 45 years prior, was again involved in the transaction. By this time Pioneer Square had been in decline for years and neighboring buildings were being demolished for parking lots rather than new development. The Mutual Life Building, though not in danger of demolition, was showing its age; its once bright buff brick darkened with decades of soot and pollution and the ground floor was now a hodgepodge of multi-colored facades and garish retail signage.

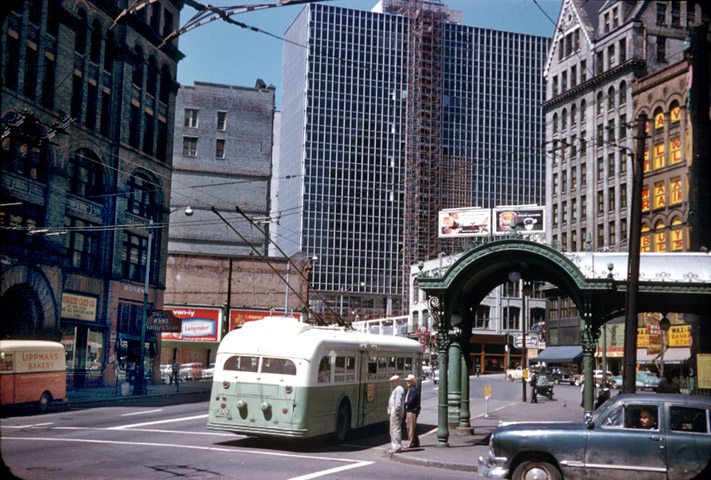
Pioneer Square c.1959, the dirty Mutual Life Building to the left.

The early 1960s saw the public rediscovery of Seattle's underground tunnels that raised awareness of the unique architecture of the Pioneer Square area and the poor condition its buildings were in. The Mutual Life Building, now mostly vacant, was recognized as one of the most important buildings on the square and well suited for renovation into studio units. The building's water-powered hydraulic elevator was identified as the last one operating in the city and possibly the country and its basement bank vaults reached by a long forgotten marble stairway were a popular destination for urban spelunkers.

In 1961, spurred on by Anne Hauber's Committee of 33 and the Municipal Art Commission, backers of a proposed ordinance to establish a historic sites council in Seattle met with community leaders in a union hall in the Mutual Life Building, officially kickstarting the city's historic preservation movement. Among those in attendance for a roundtable discussion were Henry Broderick, Joshua Green, Victor Steinbrueck, Ibsen Nelson, author Mary Bard Jensen, mayor Gordon S. Clinton and city councilman Harlan Nelson. Reflecting efforts to bring the neighborhood upscale, The Brittania Tavern, which had occupied the former bank vault space for decades, was replaced by Elroy's ice cream parlor, a popular component of Gay Nineties nostalgia, soon to be followed by more restaurants occupying the entire building and the beginnings of a cosmetic restoration that would spruce up the ground floor and finally wash away the decades of grime. In June 1970, the Pioneer Square Neighborhood was officially added to the National Register of Historic Places with the Mutual Life Building as a contributing structure and was later named a national historic site with a plaque ceremony in 1978.

With tax breaks made available by the Economic Recovery Tax Act of 1981, a $3 million loan from the Gateway Savings Bank of San Francisco, and a $920,000 Urban Development Action Grant, the building underwent a $5 million restoration in the early 1980s by developer Mutual Life Associates, headed by Peter Erickson and aided by the newly established Historic Seattle. The firms Hewitt/Daly/Isley and Olsen/Walker Architects, who had also collaborated on restorations of the Colman Building, Merrill Place and the National Building oversaw design of the project to return the Mutual Life Building to office use. By the end of the decade the building was almost fully occupied but due to high competition from a glut of new office space undercutting rental prices and rising interest rates caused by the Savings and loan crisis it was not enough to make back the money that had been loaned from the HUD grant and Mutual Life Associates filed for chapter 11 bankruptcy in July 1989. Though Mutual Life Associates would survive bankruptcy, they sold their building in 1996 to Emerald Island Limited Partnership who would sell the building ten years later to Historic Seattle, who had helped save the building from oblivion and whose offices had been located there since the 1980s.

In 2023, a proposal from Hybrid Architecture to convert the Mutual Life Building into a co-living space with 80 units of affordable housing won a citywide design competition. The competition, sponsored by the Seattle Office of Planning and Community Development, sought to explore reuse of office buildings left vacant by remote work in order to revitalize downtown areas.
