= Mud Bay (store) =

American pet store chain

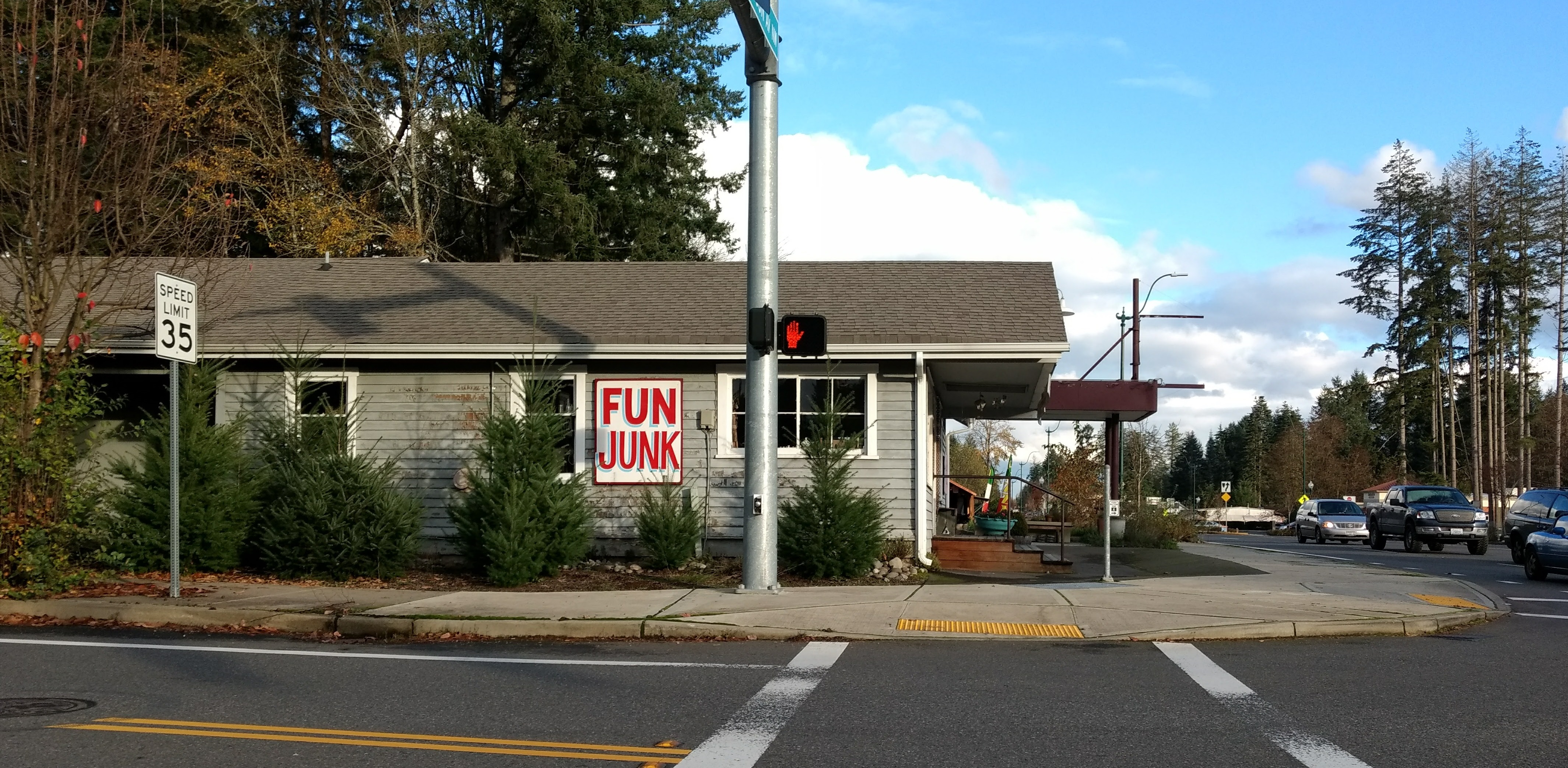
- The original Mud Bay Grainery location on Mud Bay Road
- Industry: Pet store
- Headquarters: Olympia, Washington, U.S.
- Number of locations: 58 (2019)
- Area served: Pacific Northwest
- Website: mudbay.com

Mud Bay is an American employee-owned pet store based in Olympia, Washington, with locations throughout the Pacific Northwest. The company was founded in 1988, in a 1905 feed store at Mud Bay Road and Kaiser Road in Olympia.

The first store on Mud Bay Road was originally called "Mud Bay Grainery", named after the previous occupant of the building, a health food store called "The Grainery". The owners soon re-spelled the business to "Mud Bay Granary", referencing the storage building for grain. In 2000, they acquired eight more stores and became a chain. In 2002, the company dropped the word "Granary" to become "Mud Bay" as it is now known. The chain expanded to 13 or 14 by 2004, and continued to expand through the 2009 recession: 17 stores by June 2009, 33 by 2015, 56 in Oregon and Washington by 2020. It was named Pet Business retailer of the year, 2015.

In 2015, Mud Bay announced that it would start an employee-stock ownership plan for its employees, effectively making it an employee-owned company. The co-CEOs, siblings Lars Wulff and Marissa Wulff, were inspired by The Great Game of Business to do so. On August 20, 2015, the owners and employees signed a "declaration of worker ownership" at the company's annual meeting at Green River Community College. For a few years after that, many of the company's decisions were made by a team called "The 20", most of whom were elected by employee-owner peers. Since the company reached over 500 employees in 2020, most decisions are now made by the executives, with the goal of standardizing all the 50+ stores.
