= Hull Building =

- U.S. National Register of Historic Places
- Seattle Landmark
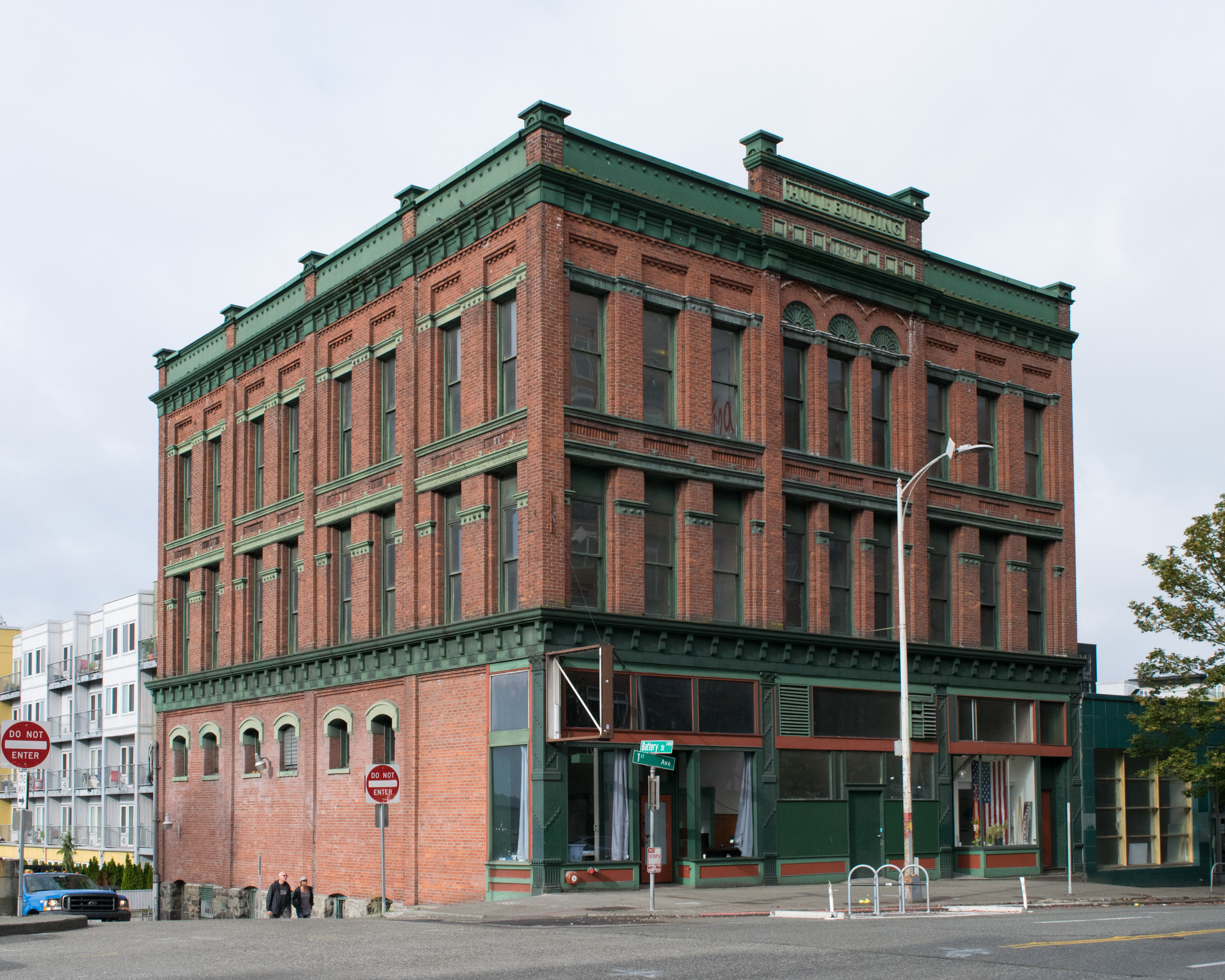
- The building's exterior in 2018

- Location within Washington (state)
- Location: 2401-2405 1st Avenue, Seattle, Washington
- Coordinates: 47°36′51″N 122°20′54″W
- Built: 1889
- Architect: Elmer H. Fisher
- Architectural style: Victorian
- NRHP reference No.: 83003340
- Added to NRHP: 1983

The Hull Building (also known as the A-1 Laundry Building) is a historic commercial building located at 2401-2405 1st Avenue in the Belltown neighborhood of Seattle, Washington. Designed by notable Northwest architect Elmer Fisher, It was constructed in the latter half of 1889 as an investment property by Seattle politician Alonzo Hull (1843-1929) and was added to the National Register of Historic Places on January 27, 1983. It is adjacent to the Battery Street Tunnel's south portal.

== History ==
The Hull Building was built in 1889 by Alonzo Hull (1843-1929), a Pennsylvania native and American Civil War veteran who had arrived in Seattle a year prior via Little Rock, Arkansas and quickly began buying property. He took an active role in the local Republican Party and served on the Seattle City Council throughout the 1890s where he helped establish the city's water system and was vital in securing the Cedar River Water shed as Seattle's primary water source. In February 1889 Hull purchased the lot at the Northwest corner of 1st Avenue (then known as Front Street) and Battery Street for $13,000 from Dr. Edward C. Kilbourne, kitty corner to William Bell's grand hotel that formed the nucleus of the burgeoning North Seattle neighborhood AKA Belltown. At Kilbourne's urging, Hull commissioned architect Elmer Fisher to design a 3-story brick building to occupy the lot with construction beginning that Spring.

Completed in January 1890, Hull's $30,000 building was one of the first substantial brick buildings completed in the neighborhood. Featuring a restrained Victorian motif with exposed corbelled brick, pressed tin trimmings and cast iron storefront columns, it was typical of Fisher's style just prior to the Great Seattle Fire. The building contained 3 store rooms facing First Avenue while the upper floors were used as working class apartments, home to the likes of cooks, stenographers, ship captains, and clerks and owners of the downstairs businesses. One of the building's earliest retail tenants was the Barnes & Co. Pharmacy; drug stores under various names would operate in the corner store for most of the early 20th century. The lack of commercial development in Belltown after the early 20th century helped preserve the building's character and eventually the upper floors fell vacant and have remained so to the present day. At some point the building's cornices were replaced with near replicas but otherwise the building has had minimal restoration work.

The Hull building was purchased by the Eng Family in 1958, who operated A-1 Laundry out the building's first floor and basement for 58 years, closing in 2016 and putting the building up for sale. It was purchased by Hull Building LLC.

== See also ==
- List of Seattle landmarks
- National Register of Historic Places listings in Seattle, Washington
