= S.S. Voigt =

American architect

Samuel Siegfried Voigt (1885–1937), commonly known as S.S. Voigt, was an architect based in Wichita, Kansas, who specialised in churches and school design. He was reported to have designed about 200 churches and more than 400 schools.

He was born in Leipzig, Germany, and came to Wichita at a young age. He worked for architect Fred G. McCune in Wichita and later established his own firm. He died unexpectedly after a short illness in 1937.

"Architect S.S. Voigt did not appear to favor a particular style in his school designs but rather embraced the popular styles of the times. His early school commissions were Progressive Era/Commercial Style buildings of the 1920s". He designed several Collegiate Gothic schools, including in 1921, 1928, and 1930. "By the mid-1930s, his school designs reflected Modern and Art Deco stylistic influences." "Kansas schools known to have been designed by Voigt are located in: Beeler, Caldwell, Chase, Coffey County, Derby, Elmdale, Harper, Lakin, Lorraine, Lost Springs, Leroy, Medicine Lodge, Moran, Piedmont, and Uttica, in addition to the 1931 Belleville High School."

Works include:

- St. Paul's African Methodist Episcopal Church (1914), Wichita
- Westside Presbyterian Church (1915), Wichita
- Barnes Building (1919), Wichita
- Fourth National Bank Building (1919), Wichita
- Salem Evangelical Church (1920), Wichita
- Rural High School District No. 2 (1921), Lost Springs, Kansas. Collegiate Gothic.
- Orpheum Theater (1922), Wichita (Note: Other sources say that the Orpheum Theater in Wichita was designed by another architect.)
- Dining room of Wolf Hotel (1923), Ellinwood, Kansas. NRHP-listed.
- Eureka Memorial Hall (1924), Eureka, Kansas
- Southwestern Osteopathic Sanitarium (1924), Wichita
- University Friends Church (1925), Wichita
- Midian Shrine Temple (1927), Wichita
- Southern Coffey County High School (1928), LeRoy, Kansas. Collegiate Gothic.
- Hotel Roberts (1930), Pratt, Kansas. NRHP-listed.
- Belleville High School (1931), Belleville, Kansas. NRHP-listed.
- New sanctuary of First Presbyterian Church of Abilene (1931), Abilene, Kansas. NRHP-listed.
- St. Mary's American Syrian Orthodox Church (1935), Wichita
- Anthony Theater (1936), Anthony, Kansas. NRHP-listed.
- Stanley African Methodist Episcopal Church (1937), Wichita
