= Belleville High School =

Belleville High School may refer to:

- Belleville High School (Belleville, Kansas), Belleville, Kansas
- Belleville High School (Belleville, Michigan), Belleville, Michigan
- Belleville High School (New Jersey), Belleville, New Jersey
- Belleville High School (Wisconsin), Belleville, Wisconsin
- Belleville High School-East, Belleville, Illinois
- Belleville High School-West, Belleville, Illinois
