= Anthony Theater =

- U.S. National Register of Historic Places
- Entrance of the Anthony Theater in 2026

- Location within Kansas Location within the United States
- Location: 220 W. Main St., Anthony, Kansas
- Coordinates: 37°09′08″N 98°01′53″W
- Area: less than one acre
- Built: 1936
- Built by: Fisher, A.N.
- Architect: S.S. Voigt
- Architectural style: Art Deco
- NRHP reference No.: 91000464
- Added to NRHP: April 18, 1991

The Anthony Theater, located at 220 W. Main St. in Anthony, Kansas, is an Art Deco-style theater built in 1936. It was listed on the National Register of Historic Places in 1991.

It was designed by architect S.S. Voigt. It is a two-story building with white concrete, buff brick, and copper brown tiles. It is 40 by 140 feet (12 m × 43 m) in plan.
