= Hotel Roberts (Pratt, Kansas) =

- U.S. National Register of Historic Places
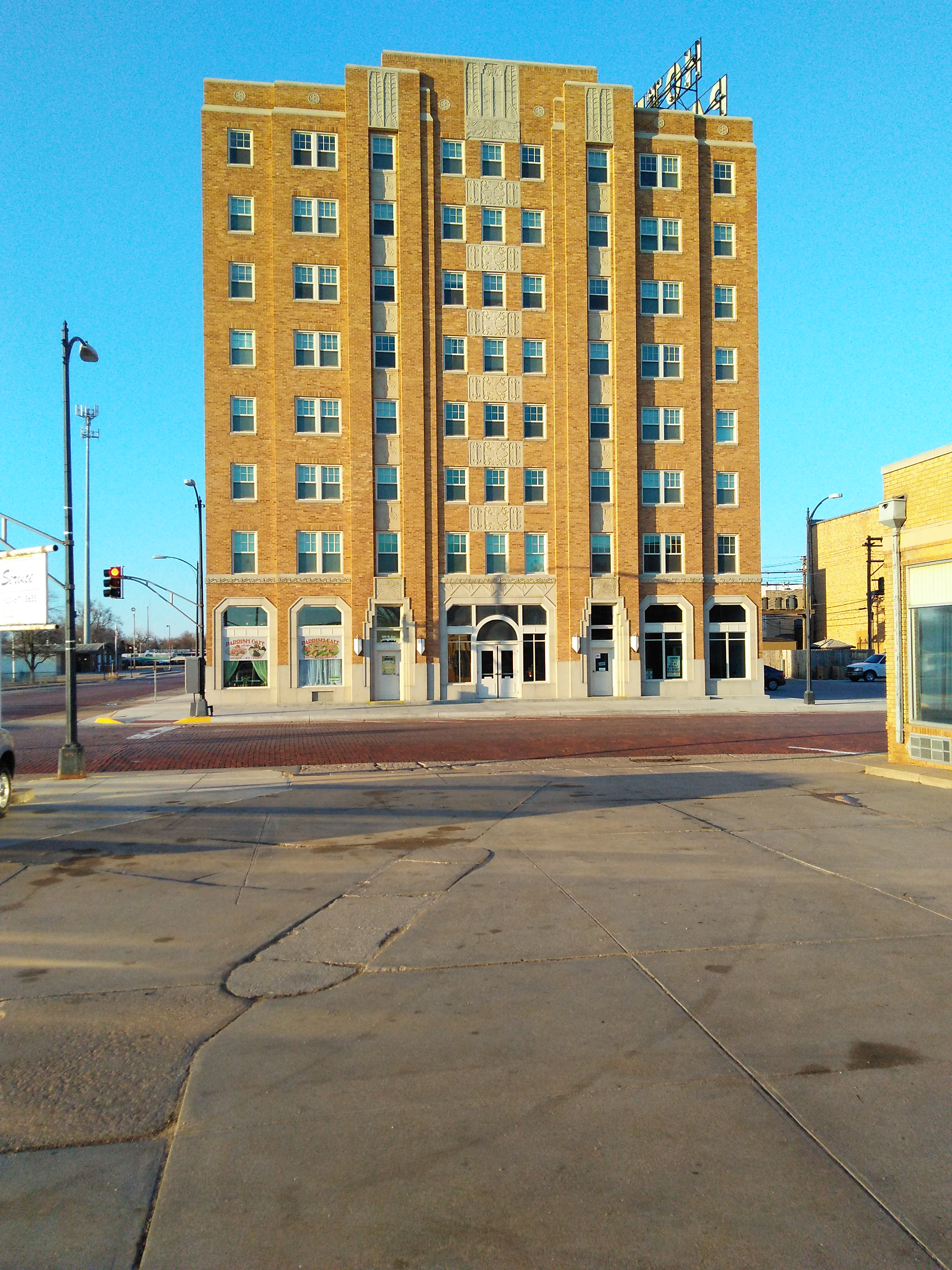
- The Hotel Roberts in 2018

- Location within Kansas Location within the United States
- Location: 120 W. 4th St. Pratt, Kansas
- Coordinates: 37°38′34″N 98°44′24″W
- Area: less than one acre
- Built: 1930
- Built by: Webster L. Elson
- Architect: S.S. Voigt
- NRHP reference No.: 14001122
- Added to NRHP: January 7, 2015

The Hotel Roberts in Pratt, Kansas, which has also been known as Hotel Parrish, was listed in the National Register of Historic Places in 2015.

It is an eight-storey hotel built in 1930. It has gold brick walls and an Art Deco style. It served as a hotel until the 1970s.

Its construction was facilitated by Pratt's Chamber of Commerce. It operated as Hotel Roberts from 1930 to 1959 when its name was changed to Hotel Parrish, under which name it operated until the 1970s when it closed.

Its NRHP nomination deems it "the largest and most highly styled historic hotel in Pratt" and "significant as an early and sophisticated example of the Art Deco style in central Kansas."
