= Grand Pacific Hotel (Seattle) =

Building in Seattle, Washington, U.S.

- U.S. National Register of Historic Places
- Seattle Landmark
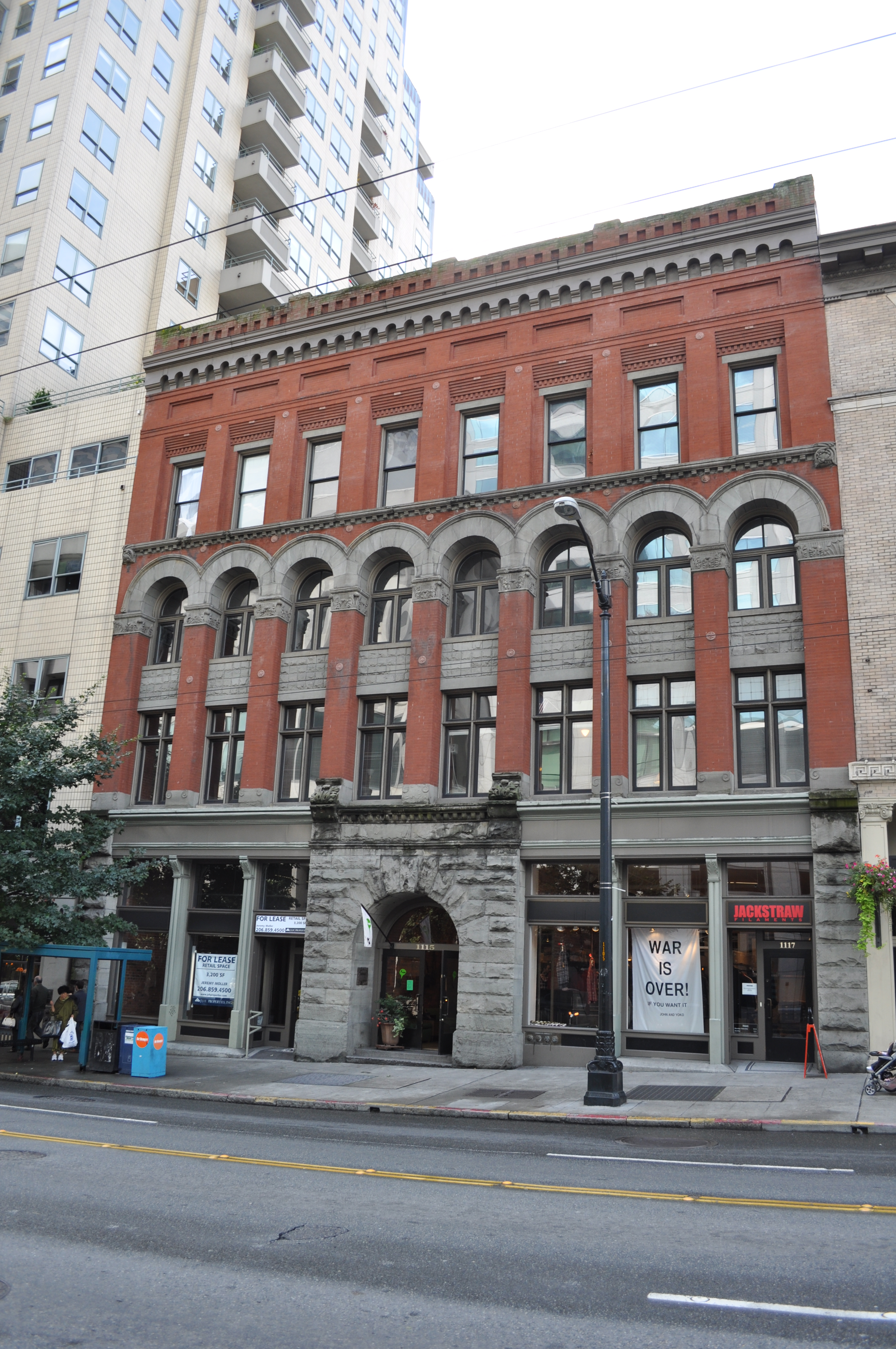
- The Grand Pacific Hotel, September 2007

- Location within Downtown Seattle
- Location: 1115-1117 1st Ave. & 1118 Post Ave, Seattle, Washington
- Coordinates: 47°36′36″N 122°20′10″W
- Built: 1890
- Architect: William E. Boone
- Architectural style: Richardsonian Romanesque
- NRHP reference No.: 82004236
- Added to NRHP: May 13, 1982

The Grand Pacific Hotel (first known as the Starr Building and sometimes the California Block (Note: This could possibly be a misattributed name as the rebuilt Toklas & Singerman Building at First & Cherry Streets was known as the California Store with the building sometimes referred to as the California Block.)) is a historic building in Seattle, Washington, United States. It located at 1115-1117 1st Avenue between Spring and Seneca Streets in the city's central business district. The building was designed in July 1889 and constructed in 1890 [Often incorrectly cited as 1898] during the building boom that followed the Great Seattle Fire of 1889. Though designed as an office building, the Grand Central had served as a Single room occupancy hotel nearly since its construction, with the Ye Kenilworth Inn on the upper floors during the 1890s. The hotel was refurnished and reopened in 1900 as the Grand Pacific Hotel, most likely named after the hotel of the same name in Chicago that had just recently been rebuilt. It played a role during the Yukon Gold Rush as one of many hotels that served traveling miners and also housed the offices for the Seattle Woolen Mill, an important outfitter for the Klondike.

The Grand Pacific Hotel is a substantial four-story brick-and-stone building designed in the Richardsonian Romanesque style and remains a rare surviving example of its kind outside of the Pioneer Square district. The Building was designed by one of Seattle's most important 19th century architects, William E. Boone, and is one of his earliest surviving projects. It was listed on the National Register of Historic Places in 1982 around the same time as the adjacent Colonial Hotel and both are Seattle city landmarks. The two hotels were interconnected during restoration in the early 1980s and today are collectively known as the Colonial Grand Pacific.

== History ==
=== Lewis Starr ===
The Grand Pacific Hotel was one of hundreds of substantial brick buildings put up in the aftermath of the Great Seattle Fire. It was constructed as the Starr Building for the estate of the late Lewis M. Starr by his widow and executrix of his estate Eliza Jane Starr. Captain Lewis M. Starr was a prominent west coast mariner and businessman, who by the late 1870s was the regional contractor for the USPS and controlled the principal steamboat business in Puget Sound started by his brother George E. Starr, whose name was memorialized on the line's flagship steamer. Starr would sell the steamship business to the newly formed Oregon Railroad and Navigation Company in 1880, the payout from which he would use to purchase his numerous Seattle real estate holdings and build a mansion in Oakland, California, (Note: The Starr mansion was once located at 980 5th Avenue in Oakland's East Peralta neighborhood. Torn down decades ago, the site is now an auto rebuild shop.) as well as becoming proprietor of the Ætna Iron Works in San Francisco. He spent the next decade traveling up and down the coast from his home, buying and developing investment properties and businesses in Seattle as well as Portland, Oregon, where he helped establish a bank and where another one of his brothers, A. M. Starr was mayor. Lewis Starr had constructed several large buildings in downtown Seattle with more proposed before dying in October 1887 after an extended illness.

=== The Building ===
Prior to the fire this property was occupied by a four-story (two stories above 1st Avenue, two below) brick building built in 1885 by lessee David Gilmore for his newly established bakery the Northwestern Cracker Company. They would relocate operations to 6th and Pine Streets after the fire. Many of Starr's Seattle properties would be rebuilt after the great fire with buildings bearing his name. While the Starr Estate had commissioned Elmer H. Fisher to design their building (co-owned with W.P. Boyd) on Pioneer Square, for this project they hired William E. Boone, Seattle's leading architect prior to the fire, and one who would hold his own into the early 1900s.

With the foundation and retaining walls begun in late 1889, the Starr Building was completed at a cost of $75,000 ($2.7 million in 2025 dollars) by contractor James McKendrick and as reported in the summer of 1890, $12,000 in stone, $3,000 in iron 1.2 million bricks and 3,000 ft of lumber had gone into its construction. Due to the dramatic slope of the property towards Elliott Bay, the four-story building had two additional floors below 1st Avenue, facing Post Alley, which housed various industrial enterprises. The Galt Brothers, a tile and fireplace accessory dealer, would first occupy the space in 1891 and The Seattle Woolen Mills would locate their offices in the lower floors during the Yukon Gold Rush.

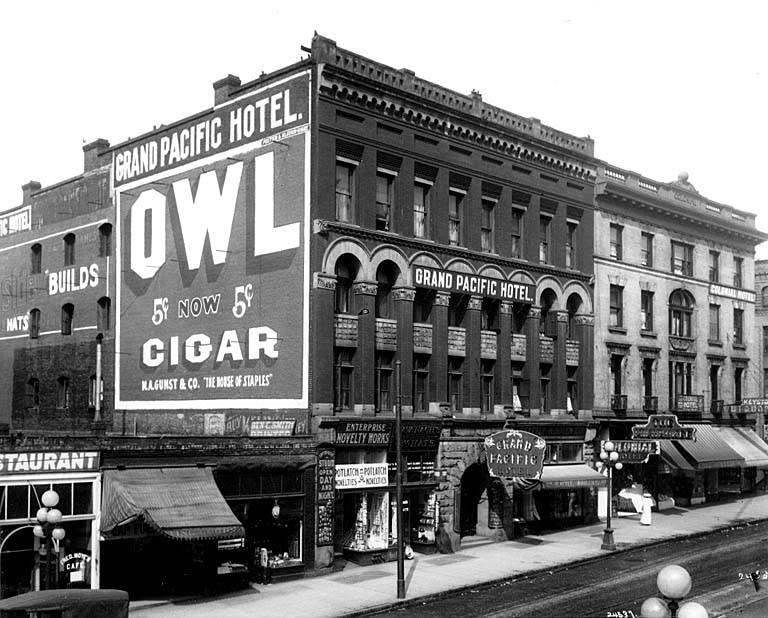
The Grand Pacific c.1912

For most of the decade the Starr Building stood out as the only fully-built structure on the block. Though designed for office space with 66 suites on its upper floors, contemporary reports of high demand for office space in Seattle turned out to be greatly exaggerated and as early as 1891, the building's upper floors were occupied by the Ye Kenilworth Inn, a Single resident occupancy hotel operated by Minnie Hayward. The Kenilworth was closed and its furnishings liquidated in November 1892 but was back open within a month under the proprietorship of Mrs. L.M. Kinnaman. In 1897 the hotel was purchased by Denver realtor Henry Harding for his sister-in-law to run. Harding turned out to be a prolific conman wanted in several states for theft and fraud and when it was discovered that the checks he had cashed with the Dexter Horton Bank were fraudulent, the hotel was surrendered to the bank to pay off the debt. By this time Harding had disappeared, having fled the country under the guise of a business meeting in Vancouver. He was eventually captured in Regina, Saskatchewan. After a succession of shady owners, the hotel was re branded around 1899 as the Grand Pacific Hotel, named after the recently remodeled hostelry in Chicago, which it is best known as today.

=== Later Owners and Restoration ===
In 1913 the Starr estate sold the building to real estate investor A. Rodgers for $125,000. In March 1914 the body of a young man was discovered in room 48, dead from an apparent suicide by ingesting Carbolic acid. A.J. Johnson, the proprietor of the hotel at the time would commit suicide just over a year later. In 1931 the building was nearly gutted by an early morning fire originating from one of the basement floors, then occupied by a wholesale fish company, that vented through the hotel's central court, where flames were said to shoot 75 feet into the air. All 67 guests were either able to escape or were rescued by firefighters.

The hotel continued to serve long-term guests up until October 1966, when Seattle slum clearing policies instituted by the newly formed Nuisance abatement board forced the now run-down hotel to close. Citing prohibitive repair costs, the building's then owner, Kerry Timber Co., evicted all the residents and closed off the building's top floors indefinitely. Beginning in the late 70s, The Grand Pacific and other historic buildings in the area were restored and redeveloped by Cornerstone Development Co, a subsidiary of Kerry Timber successor Weyerhaeuser as part of the Waterfront Center project, which combined new construction with older buildings restored for housing. During restoration, The Grand Pacific Hotel was interconnected with the Colonial Hotel to the north. The Grand Pacific Hotel was listed on the National Register of Historic Places on May 13, 1982.

== See also ==
- National Register of Historic Places listings in Seattle
