= Wolf Hotel =

- U.S. National Register of Historic Places
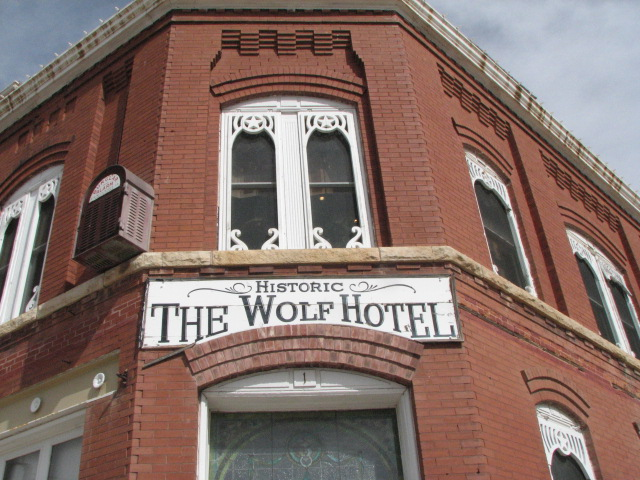
- The Wolf Hotel in 2021

- Location within Kansas Location within the United States
- Location: 104 E. Santa Fe, Ellinwood, Kansas
- Coordinates: 38°21′13″N 98°34′50″W
- Area: Less than one acre
- Built: 1894
- Architect: S.S. Voigt
- Architectural style: Italianate, Mission/spanish Revival
- NRHP reference No.: 02001295
- Added to NRHP: November 7, 2002

The Wolf Hotel, located at 104 E. Santa Fe in Ellinwood in Barton County, Kansas, was built in 1894. It was listed on the National Register of Historic Places in 2002.

It was designed by architect S.S. Voigt in Italianate style. It is a commercial two-part commercial block building which is 140 feet (43 m) deep (east to west) and 50 feet (15 m) wide at its west end. It is narrower, 30 feet (9.1 m) at the east end.
