= Barnes Building =

- U.S. National Register of Historic Places
- Seattle Landmark
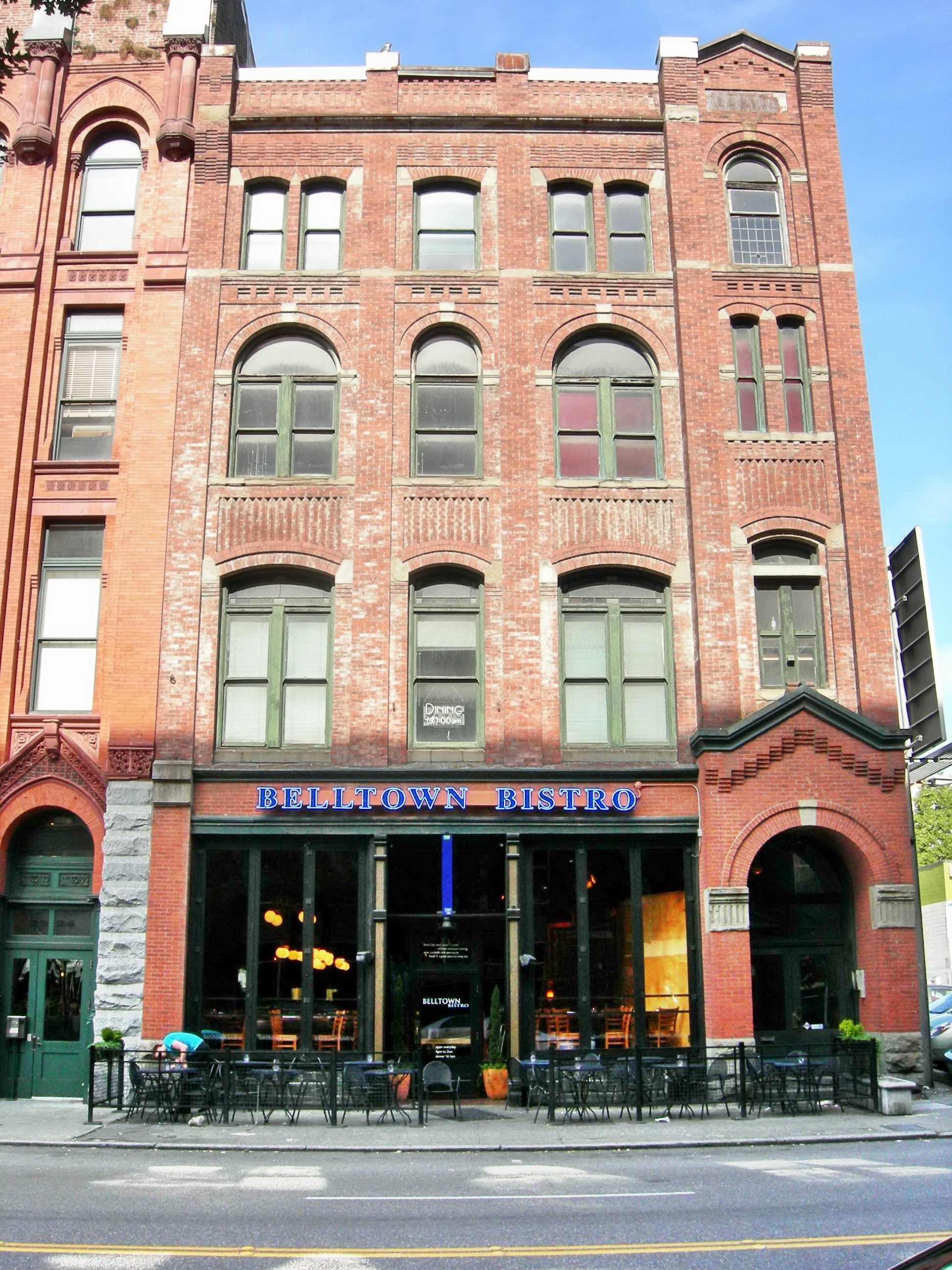
- The building's exterior in 2007

- Location within Downtown Seattle
- Location: 2322 1st Ave. Seattle, Washington
- Coordinates: 47°36′50″N 122°20′49″W
- Built: 1890
- Architect: William E. Boone, George Meeker
- Architectural style: Victorian
- NRHP reference No.: 75001853
- SEATL No.: 107754

Significant dates
- Added to NRHP: 1975-02-25
- Designated SEATL: October 23, 1978

The Barnes Building, originally known as the Odd Fellows' Block, the Masonic Temple from 1909 to 1915, and later Ingram Hall, is a historic fraternal and office building located at 2320-2322 1st Avenue in the Belltown neighborhood of Seattle, Washington. Designed in early 1889 but not constructed until late 1890 by Seattle Lodge No. 7 of the International Order of Odd Fellows and intended for use by all of the city's Odd Fellow lodges, it is the earliest known surviving work of Seattle architect William E. Boone and George Meeker and remains in an almost perfect state of preservation. The Barnes building has played an important role in the Belltown Community and Seattle's dance community. It was used by the Odd Fellows for 17 years before their departure to a newer, bigger hall in 1909 and was home to a variety of fraternal & secret societies throughout the early 20th century, with the Free and Accepted Masons being the primary tenant until their own Hall was built in 1915. The ground floor has been a host to a variety of tenants since 1890 ranging from furniture sales to dry goods to farm implement sales and sleeping bag manufacturing, most recently being home to several bars. It was added to the National Register of Historic Places as The Barnes Building on February 24, 1975.

== History ==
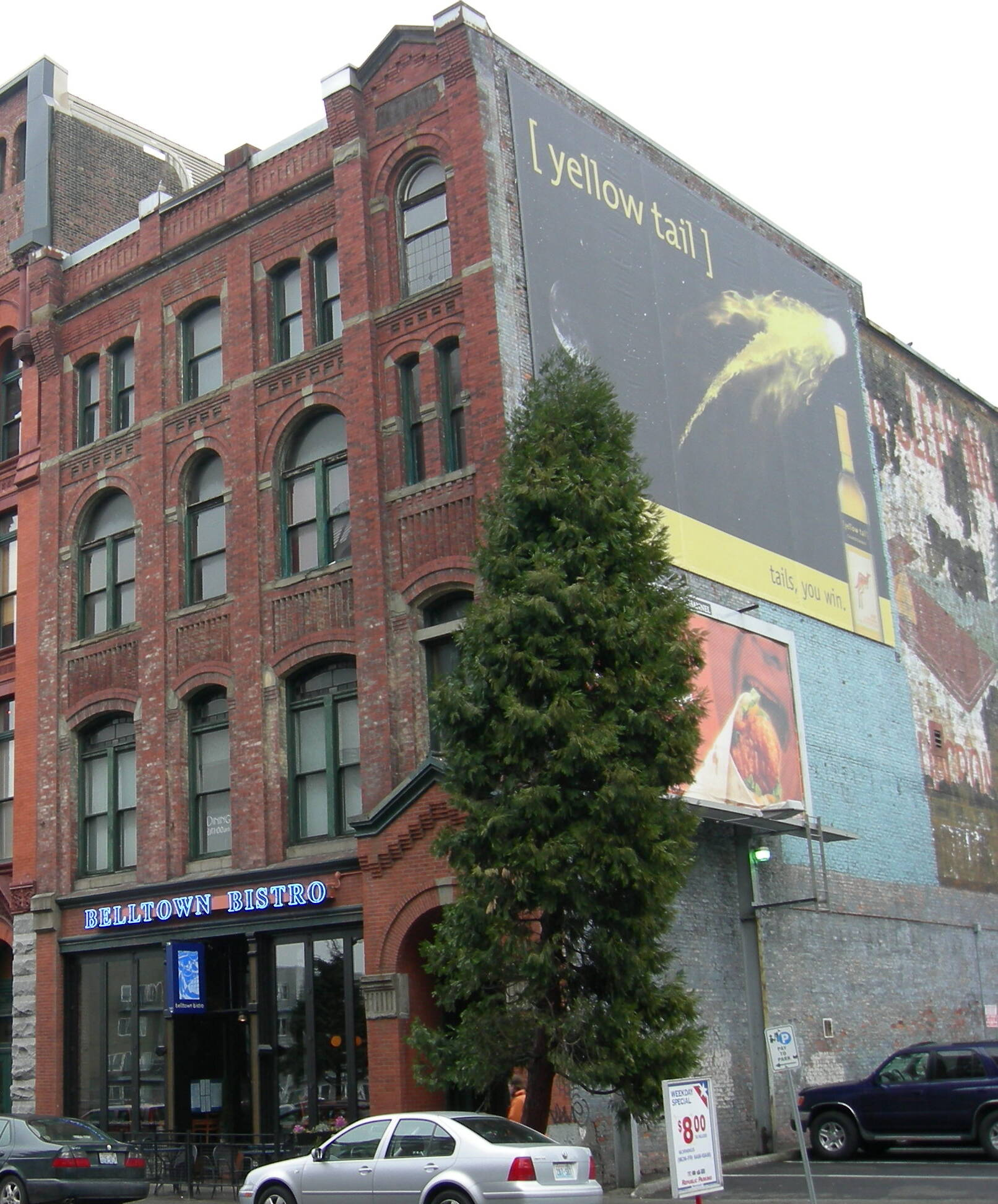
The building's exterior, 2007

Seattle Lodge No. 7 of the International Order of Odd Fellows, first organized in 1876, began meeting on this block the following year when Seattle pioneer and Belltown namesake William Nathaniel Bell had a hall constructed for their use on the lot where the Austin A. Bell Building currently stands. The cost of fitting out the hall was split evenly between Seattle's two major lodges, Olive Branch Lodge No. 4 and Seattle Lodge No. 7 and soon became host to numerous social & benevolent organizations. By the end of the 1880s Seattle Lodge No. 7 was the largest Odd Fellows lodge in the state with membership nearing 200. In early 1889, it was announced that the lodge planned to build a new substantial brick building on their lot. After reviewing several competing designs, they chose those of veteran architect William E. Boone, who at the time was partnered with George Meeker. The building, to cost $30,000 was to be four stories in height with a basement. The first floor would be devoted to a single retail space, while the second floor would have a large assembly hall in back with offices in front. The third and fourth floors would contain the Odd Fellows' meeting space and divided offices. While the plans for the building remained the same, the location would change slightly. With landlord Austin Bell wanting the lot adjacent to his late father's hotel to construct his own substantial building, the Odd fellows purchased the lot immediately south of their hall and planned to move the building, which they had also purchased from the Bell family, onto the lot until finances permitted the construction of their new building.

Construction finally began in late July 1890, just as the first wave of re-construction following the Great Seattle Fire was winding down. Despite the advancement of architectural styles in the wake of the fire, the Odd Fellows stuck with Boone's rusticated Victorian design. The old wooden hall was once again moved, to the corner of Depot and Wall streets where the lodge would continue to meet while their new building was built. (Note: The Odd Fellows had sold the relocated building to W.A. Flindall who operated a grocery store on the ground floor for about a year. The hall was destroyed by a fire in October 1891 at which point it was only being used for storage.) The cornerstone was laid in a ceremony on August 27, 1890 with over 200 lodge members and onlookers present. A time capsule was placed within the cornerstone containing copies of the lodge archives and other historical documents. Construction progressed rapidly- The lodge was completely under roof by October, the ground floor was occupied by the Belltown Furniture Company by November and fraternal functions were being held in the building by December, although the main meeting hall wasn't fully in use until January 1891.

Within a year the Belltown Furniture Company moved out of the first floor and the Seattle Dry Goods Store took its place, only for that store to go out of business by February 1893, likely a casualty of the Panic of 1893. The next tenant to occupy the ground floor around the turn of the century was the Seattle Vehicle and Implement Company, who sold Moline Wagons and John Deere implements.

By the early 1900s, the Odd Fellows began to outgrow their space, with various lodges being forced to rent extra space around the city for their needs. In 1905 the leading lodges of Seattle purchased land in the Capitol Hill neighborhood and constructed a new lodge, completed in 1908. After the Odd Fellows' departure from their building in 1909 the lodge rooms remained in use by other fraternal organizations including the Loyal Order of Moose and the Free and Accepted Masons, who had sold their own William Boone-designed building at Second and Pike to the Peoples Savings Bank for conversion into an office tower. At this point the building became known as the Masonic Temple until 1915, when the Masons too relocated to larger quarters on Capitol Hill. The other organizations remained and throughout the 1920s were joined by many social and religious organizations such as the Pentecostal Mission and the International Bible Students Association while somewhat ironically the ground floor was occupied by The Rheine, a beer parlor, opened soon after the repeal of prohibition. The Rheine's proprietor Atwill D. Miller also ran a dance hall above his bar known as Cap's Old Time Dance. During this time the building was referred to as Ingram Hall and soon became a popular place for all kinds of dances and dance classes. A ghost sign on the rear of the building that advertises "Ballroom Dancing" can still be seen today. In the 1970s the building was home to the Seattle Dance Center, opened by the First Chamber Dance Company, Seattle's first resident professional ballet company. The building, now being referred to as the Barnes Building, (Note: City Landmark and National Register documentation fails to mention the origin of this name.) was added to the National Register of Historic Places on February 24, 1975 and became a city of Seattle Landmark in 1978.

The building's basement was occupied by several light manufacturing firms throughout the 20th century including the Washington Quilt Company, which was destroyed by a fire on January 31, 1955 which also heavily damaged the ground floor, then occupied by the 1st Avenue Tavern, causing over $60,000 in damages without harming the building's structural integrity. The building was occupied by the Belltown Pub on the ground floor from 2010 until its closure on May 28, 2019, with the owners citing high operating costs. The Screwdriver Bar currently occupies the basement while the upper floors are rented out as Class C office space.
