= Tin Table =

Defunct restaurant in Seattle, Washington, U.S.

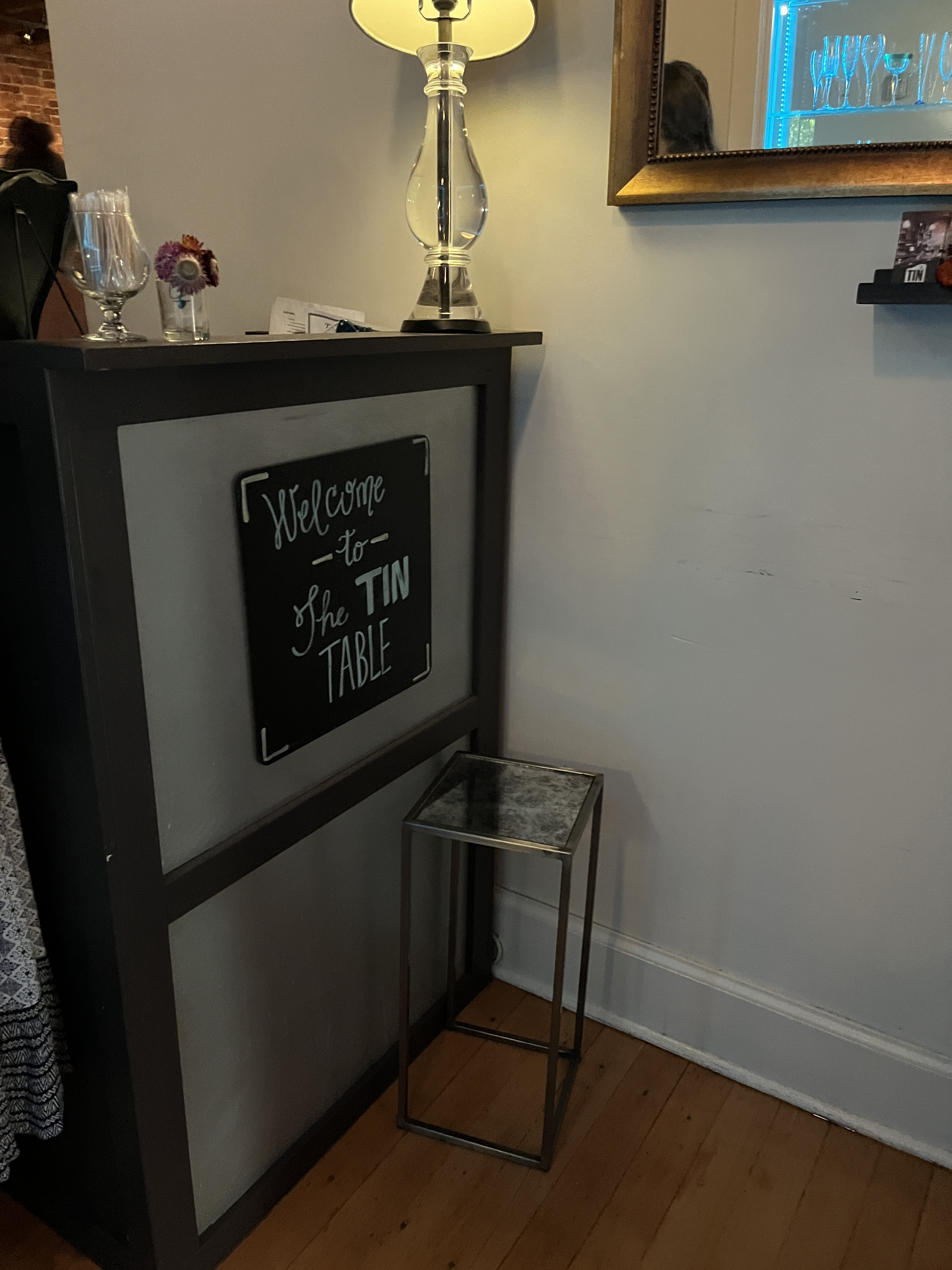
- Interior, 2023
- Interactive map of Tin Table

Restaurant information
- Established: 2009
- Owner: Hallie Kuperman
- Chef: Donna Looney
- Food type: Pacific Northwest
- Location: Seattle, Washington, United States
- Coordinates: 47.6151°N 122.3199°W
- Website: thetintable.com

Tin Table was a restaurant in Seattle, Washington, United States. Hallie Kuperman opened the restaurant in Capitol Hill's Oddfellows Hall in 2009, across from the Century Ballroom, which she also owned. Described as a "upscale" pub, the restaurant served Pacific Northwest cuisine. It has closed permanently.

== Description ==
Tin Table was an LGBTQ and woman-owned restaurant on the second floor of the Oddfellows Hall, on Capitol Hill. Described by Eater Seattle as an "upscale" pub, Tin Table had a lounge, a long bar, and exposed brick.

According to Tasting Table, the restaurant served "pub-style" Pacific Northwest cuisine such as duck pastrami, meatloaf, ricotta gnocchi, and truffle mashed potatoes. The menu included risotto, wings, bruschetta, steak frites, and the Floozy Burger, which had bacon, caramelized onion, cheese, and French fries). The brunch menu had brisket Benedicts, scrambles with Dungeness crab, Bloody Marys, and mimosas. The drink menu had the Spritz into Spring, which is a variation of a "classic" wine spritzer with Chareau, vodka, and vermouth. Happy hour was popular; the special menu had pastas, burgers, fries, and discounted drinks.

== History ==
Hallie Kuperman opened Tin Table in 2009, across from Century Ballroom, which she also opened in 1997. Frank Wielgosiek was a chef, as of 2012–2022. Michael Seidel joined as a pastry chef in 2012, which also allowed him to be the cakemaker for Century Ballroom. Donna Looney and Dan Wunderlich were also chefs at Tin Table.

Like many restaurants, Tin Table closed was forced to close temporarily upon the arrival of the COVID-19 pandemic. The restaurant re-opened with an updated menu in May 2020, and used a pulley system deliver food orders for pickup while maintaining social distance. Tin Table also used Century Ballroom as a dining area compliant with distancing requirements. For Thanksgiving in 2020, a take-out menu included herb roasted turkey, buttermilk rolls, winter squash, and yams. In December, the business and Century Ballroom launched a GoFundMe campaign to stay afloat. Tin Table began hosting free monthly lunch meetups for LGBTQ seniors in 2021, as part of the DineTogether program.

Novelist Kevin O'Brien referenced Tin Table in his books Terrified (2011) and The Night She Disappeared (2021); in the latter, the restaurant is described as a "chic, semi-bohemian eatery in Seattle's trendy Pike/Pine neighborhood".

Tin Table has closed permanently.

== Reception ==
In 2009, Seattle Metropolitan's Kathryn Robinson said she and her dining partner "were well-served by all manner of kindly hipsters, from the genuinely welcoming spiky-haired greeter at the door to the long-haired lovely who refilled our water glasses with nothin' but love". Seattle Magazine called Tin Table "sleek" and "sexy" in 2011. Julien Perry included the restaurants in Eater Seattle's 2021 list of the city's 23 best late night dining options, based on reader feedback.

== See also ==
- List of defunct restaurants of the United States
- List of Pacific Northwest restaurants
