= Caldwell Carnegie Library (Caldwell, Kansas) =

- U.S. National Register of Historic Places
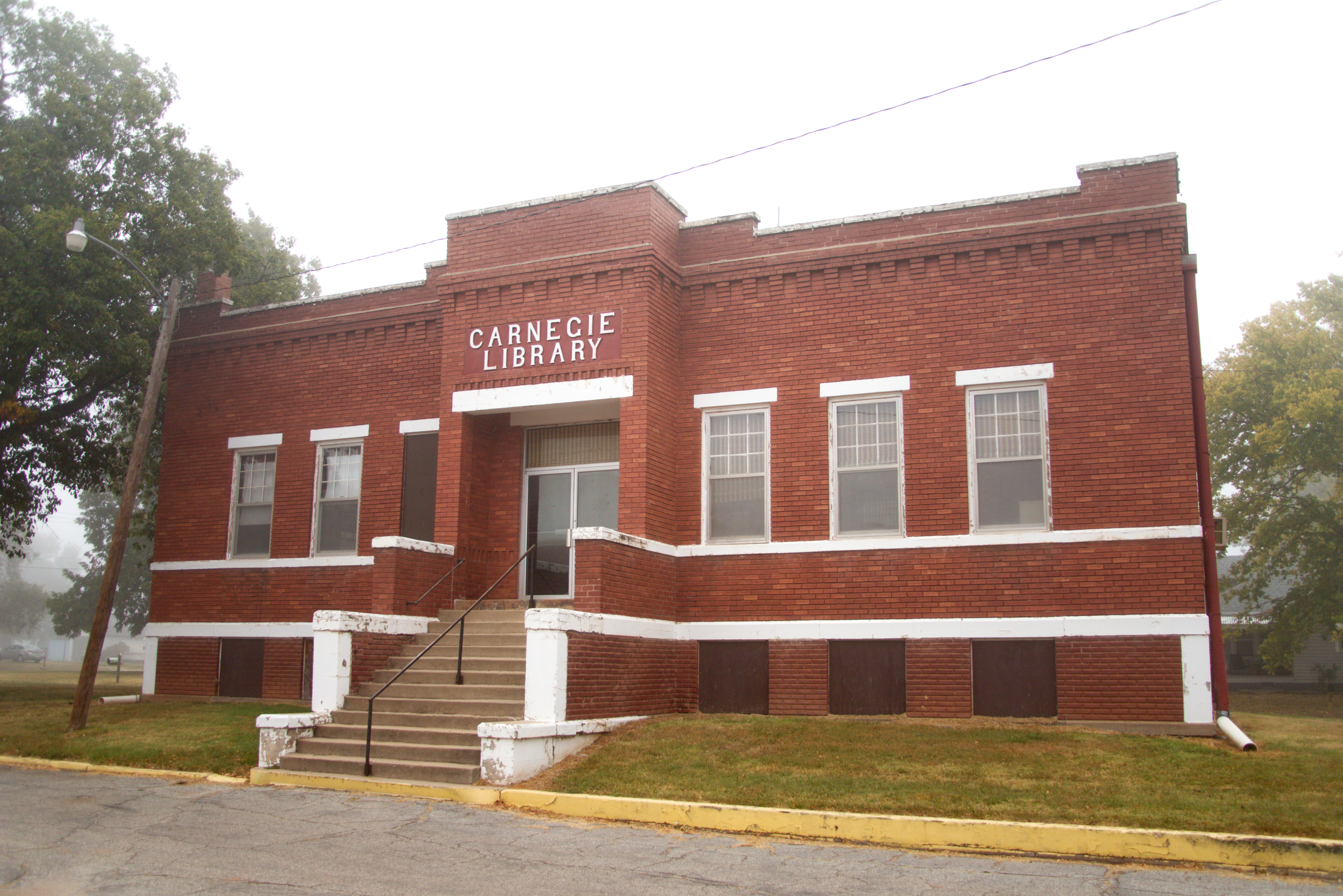
- Caldwell Carnegie Library (Caldwell, Kansas)

- Location within Kansas Location within the United States
- Location: 13 N. Osage St., Caldwell, Kansas
- Coordinates: 37°01′58″N 97°36′34″W
- Area: less than one acre
- Built: 1912
- Architect: Fred G. McCune
- NRHP reference No.: 83000443
- Added to NRHP: February 24, 1983

The Caldwell Carnegie Library, located at 13 N. Osage St. in Caldwell, Kansas, was completed in 1912. It was listed on the National Register of Historic Places in 1983.

It is a Carnegie library designed by Wichita architect Fred G. McCune. It is a 61 by 30 feet (18.6 m × 9.1 m) concrete block building with a brick veneer.

In 2006, the contents of the library moved to a new downtown location (120 South Main Street) and the building sat vacant. In 2023, the building was purchased by Mark Barrett and Morrison Browne for use as a private residence.
