= William E. Boone =

American architect

- Born: September 3, 1830; Luzerne County, Pennsylvania, U.S.
- Died: October 29, 1921 (aged 91); Seattle, Washington, U.S.
- Occupation: Architect

William Boone (3 September 1830, in Luzerne County, Pennsylvania – 29 October 1921, in Seattle, Washington) was an American architect who practiced mainly in Seattle, Washington from 1882 until 1905. He was one of the founders of the Washington State chapter of the American Institute of Architects as well as its first president. For the majority of the 1880s, he practiced with George Meeker as Boone and Meeker, Seattle's leading architectural firm at the time. In his later years he briefly worked with William H. Willcox as Boone and Willcox and later with James Corner as Boone and Corner. Boone was one of Seattle's most prominent pre-fire architects whose career lasted into the early 20th century outlasting many of his peers. Few of his buildings remain standing today, as many were destroyed in the Great Seattle fire including one of his most well known commissions, the Yesler – Leary Building, built for pioneer Henry Yesler whose mansion Boone also designed. After the fire, he founded the Washington State chapter of the American Institute of Architects and designed the first steel frame office building in Seattle, among several other large brick and public buildings that are still standing in the Pioneer Square district.

== Early life and career ==
William Ely Boone, said to be a direct descendant of frontiersman Daniel Boone, was born in Luzerne County, Pennsylvania near Kingston on September 3, 1830. He moved to Chicago as a young man and worked in construction as a carpenter for a railroad company before becoming involved with building design in Minneapolis from 1853 to 1856. he was lured further west by the Cariboo Gold Rush in British Columbia, where he reportedly struck it rich only to promptly lose it all from bad business decisions. In 1859 he relocated to the San Francisco Bay Area, where he worked as a journeyman architect-builder-contractor, securing over $1 million in projects during his brief residency. He only appears in the 1859 & 1860 San Francisco city directories, where he is listed as staying in the famous What Cheer House.

He first arrived in the Puget Sound region in 1870 where he appears in the 1870 United States census residing in Olympia, Washington. While there he managed the construction of several small structures in and around that city and oversaw the design and construction of the federal prison at nearby McNeil Island, Washington, whose numerous issues kept him busy for the next 3 years. He took an active role in the local Masonic lodge and was married in 1872 to local school teacher Mercie Slocum. Boone returned to the bay area periodically throughout the 1870s where he acted as contractor on public schools, homes, churches, Oakland's second city hall building, and several buildings for the California School for the Blind, all under the supervision of other architects.

== Seattle, Boone and Meeker ==
Boone relocated to Seattle permanently in 1881 where he worked on projects between there and Tacoma. In 1883, he formed the partnership of Boone and Meeker with George Meeker of Oakland, California, who is thought to have remained in Oakland for the majority of their partnership. In Seattle, Boone designed mostly commercial buildings, being responsible for most of the city's earliest brick buildings.

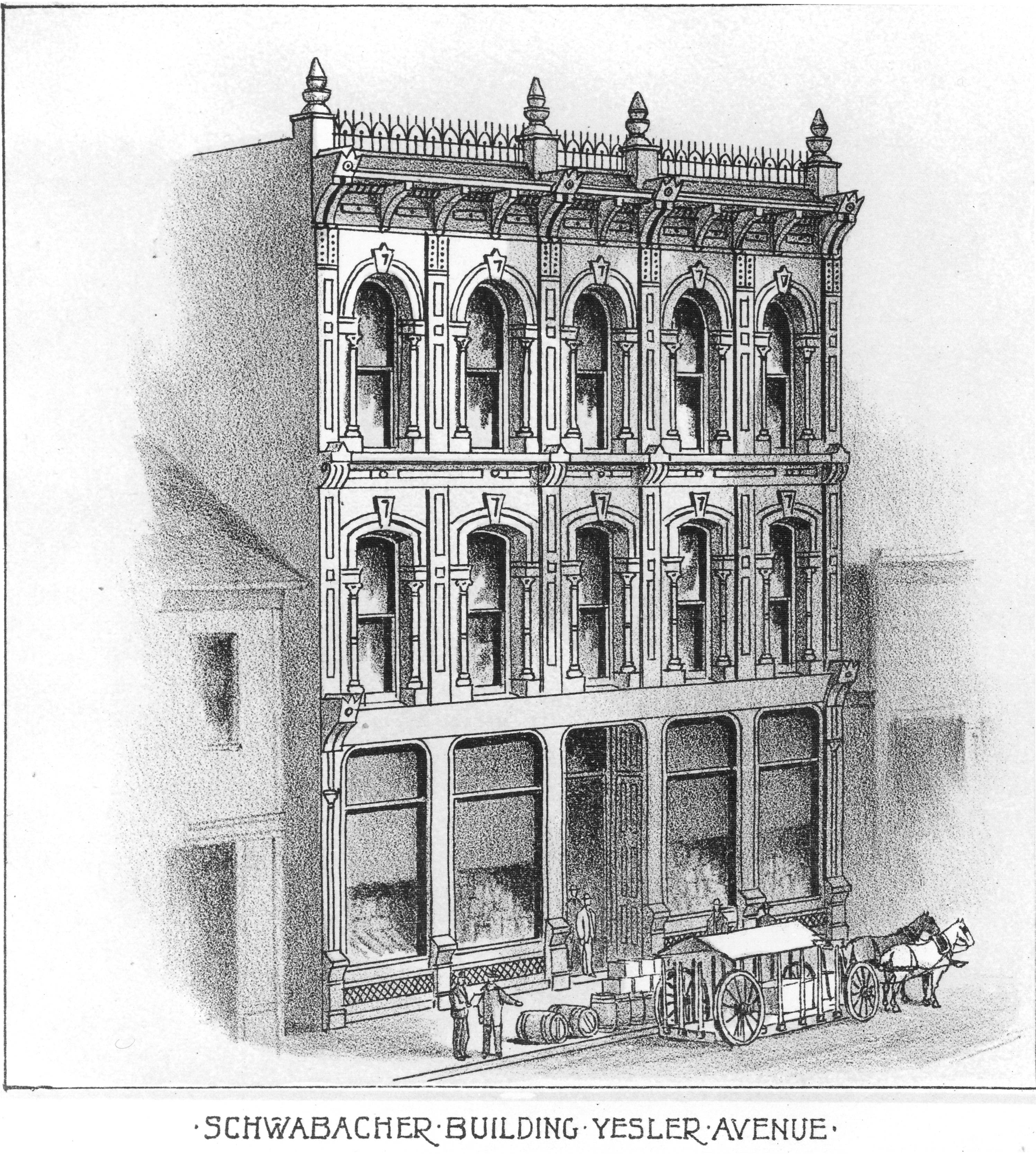
Schwabacher Building (1883, Destroyed)

In 1883, his design was chosen for Henry Yesler and John Leary's business block at the corner of Front (First) Street and Mill (Yesler) Street. The design, based on San Francisco's original Phelan Block (1878–1881, destroyed) featured high Italianate and Second Empire detail and a prominent octagonal turret. It was described by local newspapers as Seattle's "finest building and symbolic of the city's new metropolitan character." Boone and Meeker located their offices in the new building where they remained until the fire. Boone planned a four-story addition to the Yesler – Leary Building but as Seattle's first building boom began to wind down in 1884, these plans were shelved. The building was eventually built by Boone in 1888 but only at three floors and in a more subtle style.

At the same time as the Yesler – Leary Building, Boone was also preparing plans for a new residence for Henry Yesler. Completed in 1884, it was categorized as Eastlake style but combined elements of Victorian, Queen Anne and Eastlake. The home occupied an entire city block and was Seattle's largest home at the time. During 1884, Boone and Meeker shifted their focus to Tacoma, which had recently been selected as Northern Pacific Railway's West Coast terminus over Seattle, prompting a building boom there while Seattle's waned. There they designed the Annie Wright School and several other commercial and residential structures.

By 1887, Seattle's economy began to rebound and construction activity was picking back up. Boone and Meeker resumed their position as the city's leading architectural office with several large commercial projects. By the late 1880s, architectural trends in the Northwest were catching up with the east coast, moving away from the highly decorated Italianate buildings clad in stucco and cast iron and more towards rusticated stone and exposed brick. This was reflected in one of the firm's first projects of 1887, the Toklas & Singerman Building at the Southwest corner of First and Columbia Streets. The following year, Boone oversaw the construction of one of Seattle's first modern office buildings, the Boston Block at Second and Columbia. Designed by Boston firm Winslow & Wetherell, it was massive in size and practically unadorned. It reflected the principles of the Chicago School and would influence Boone's later work. The Boston Block housed the city's first passenger elevator and was one of the very few buildings in downtown to survive the great fire in 1889. In 1888 the firm submitted two different designs in a bid for Seattle's first two brick school houses. The school district wound up choosing both. Boone and Meeker's first projects in 1889 included the Ramona Hotel at 1st and Seneca Street (now demolished) and the I.O.O.F. Building in Belltown, one of his earliest known surviving designs.

== Post-fire years ==
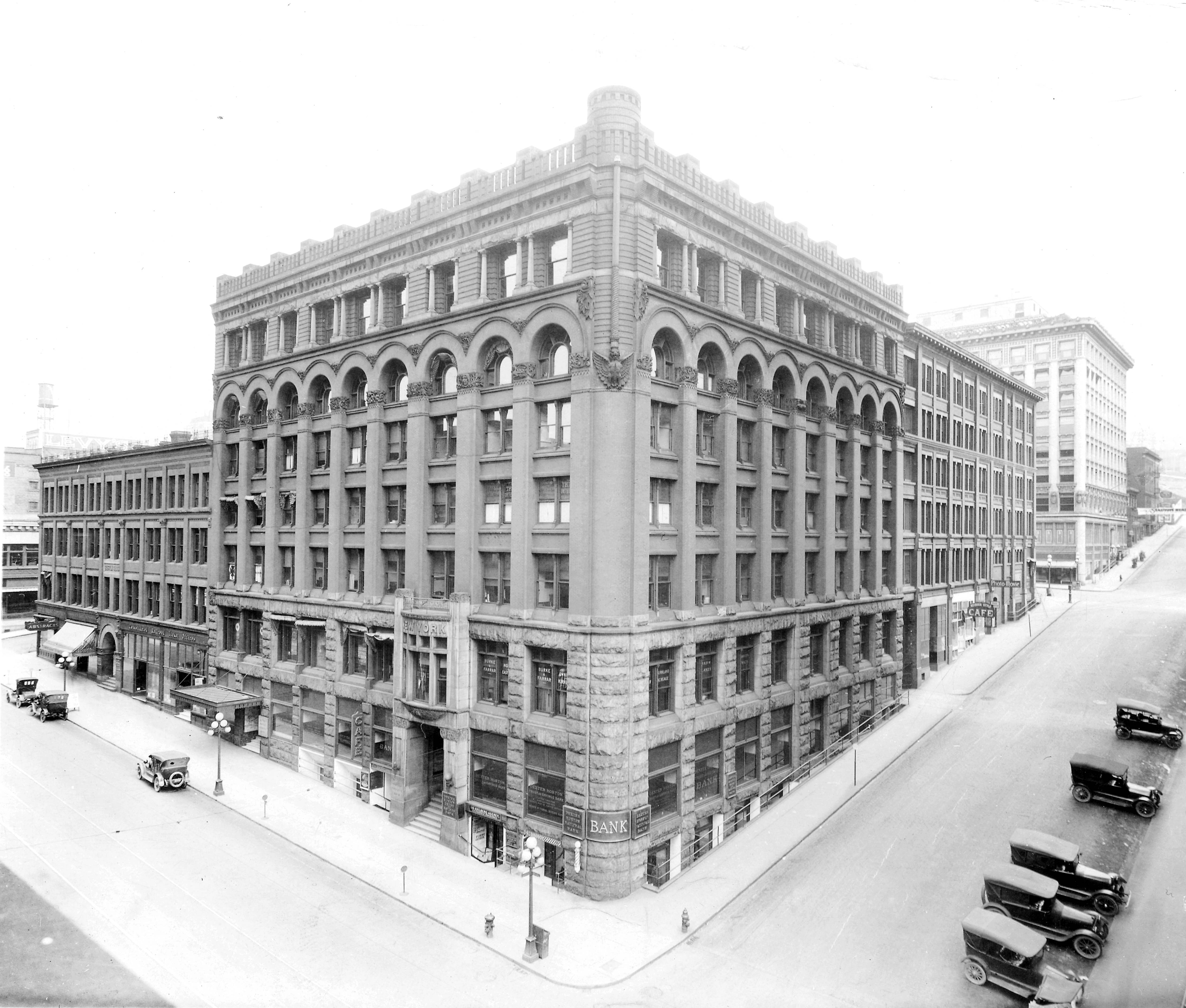
New York Block (1891–2, Demolished)

Following the destruction of his offices in the Yesler – Leary Building in the Great Seattle Fire, Boone moved the firm's offices into the Boston Block at Second Avenue and Columbia Street, which had only required minor repairs to make it habitable again. By 1890, Boone was entering his 60s and while most of his peers were retired or dead, he continued to adapt to rapidly modernizing architectural tastes. His partnership with Meeker was dissolved in 1889 and he was once again a solo architect.

The building boom following the great Seattle fire attracted many younger architects with fresh ideas such as the prolific Elmer Fisher to the area who soon unseated Boone as Seattle's top architect. Boone was still a respected architect in the Northwest and continued to receive sizable commissions, designing such buildings as the identical McKenny & Marshall–Walker Buildings in Olympia and Seattle, respectively, and the massive 7-story New York Block, Seattle's first steel-frame skyscraper. The New York Block was credited to the short-lived firm of Boone and William Willcox from 1891 to 1892 but the design is largely credited to Boone. Boone moved his offices into the New York Block following its completion. These later buildings displayed a more simplified design along the lines of Romanesque Revival architecture that emerged in the late 1880s, shaped by the influence of Henry Hobson Richardson, as well as Burnham and Root and other architects of the Chicago School, much in contrast to most of Boone's previous work and architectural knowledge. Boone and Willcox were also architects of the Plymouth Congregational Church, a building that reflected Willcox's previous experience in church design in the American Midwest.

In 1891, Boone and Willcox were selected to plan the new campus for the University of Washington. The plan that included 16 buildings was halted after ten days of construction as a result of flaws in the legislation that created the university. Boone and Willcox dissolved their partnership in June 1892 and when construction resumed on the university in 1893, the firm's plans were dropped in favor of a competition for a single main building won by Charles Saunders.

== Late career and death ==
Boone, as well as most architects during the time, had little work in the years following the Panic of 1893 and effectively retired, putting his focus on matters of the Seattle Chamber of commerce, of which he was a member. It appears he only designed several small residences and one commercial building during this time. In 1894, he helped instigate the Washington State chapter of the American Institute of Architects (AIA), laying the foundation for the architecture profession in Washington. Boone was elected the chapter's first president. Over the next several years, he only took on several small projects, collaborating with Edwin Houghton and other architects on residential and industrial improvements, and in 1896 supervised the completion of the Mutual Life Building. In 1899, with the economy in full rebound after the Yukon Gold Rush, he formed a new partnership with James Corner, who had formerly worked with Warren Skillings. Together they designed numerous large commercial buildings and warehouses that still stand in the Pioneer Square neighborhood. Many of these later buildings show a large influence of the Chicago School Style, with minimum ornamentation and facades dominated by large pivoting or picture windows, a style which Corner would continue to utilize after the dissolution of their partnership. One of their biggest projects and one of Boone's last was the stone-clad Seattle High School (later known as Broadway High School) in 1902 and 1903. After 1905 Boone reduced his practice activities and by 1910 had retired altogether. He died in Seattle in October 1921 at the age of 91.

== Projects ==
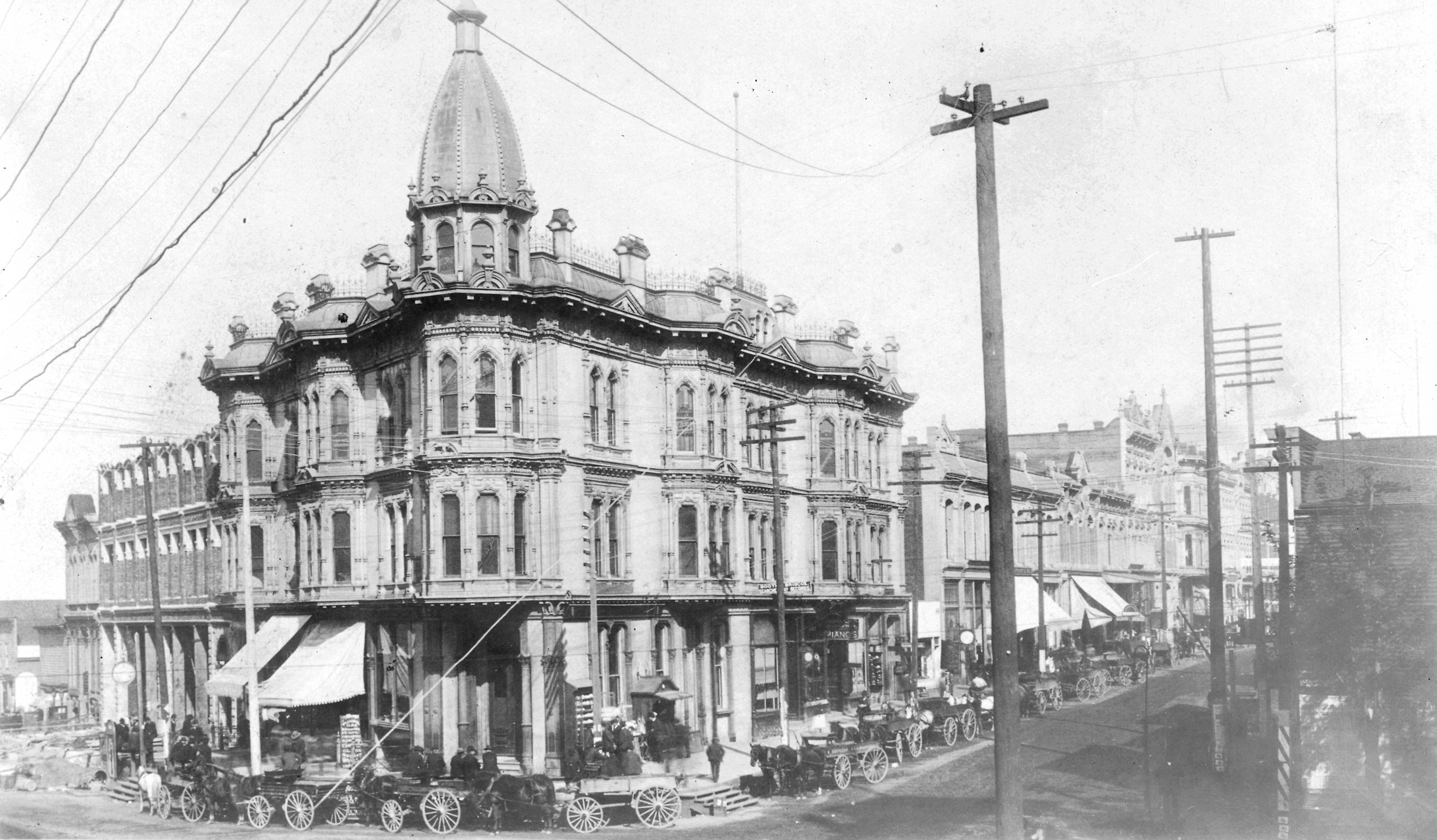
Yesler-Leary Building (New Yesler Block to the left) from the intersection of 1st Ave. and Yesler Way

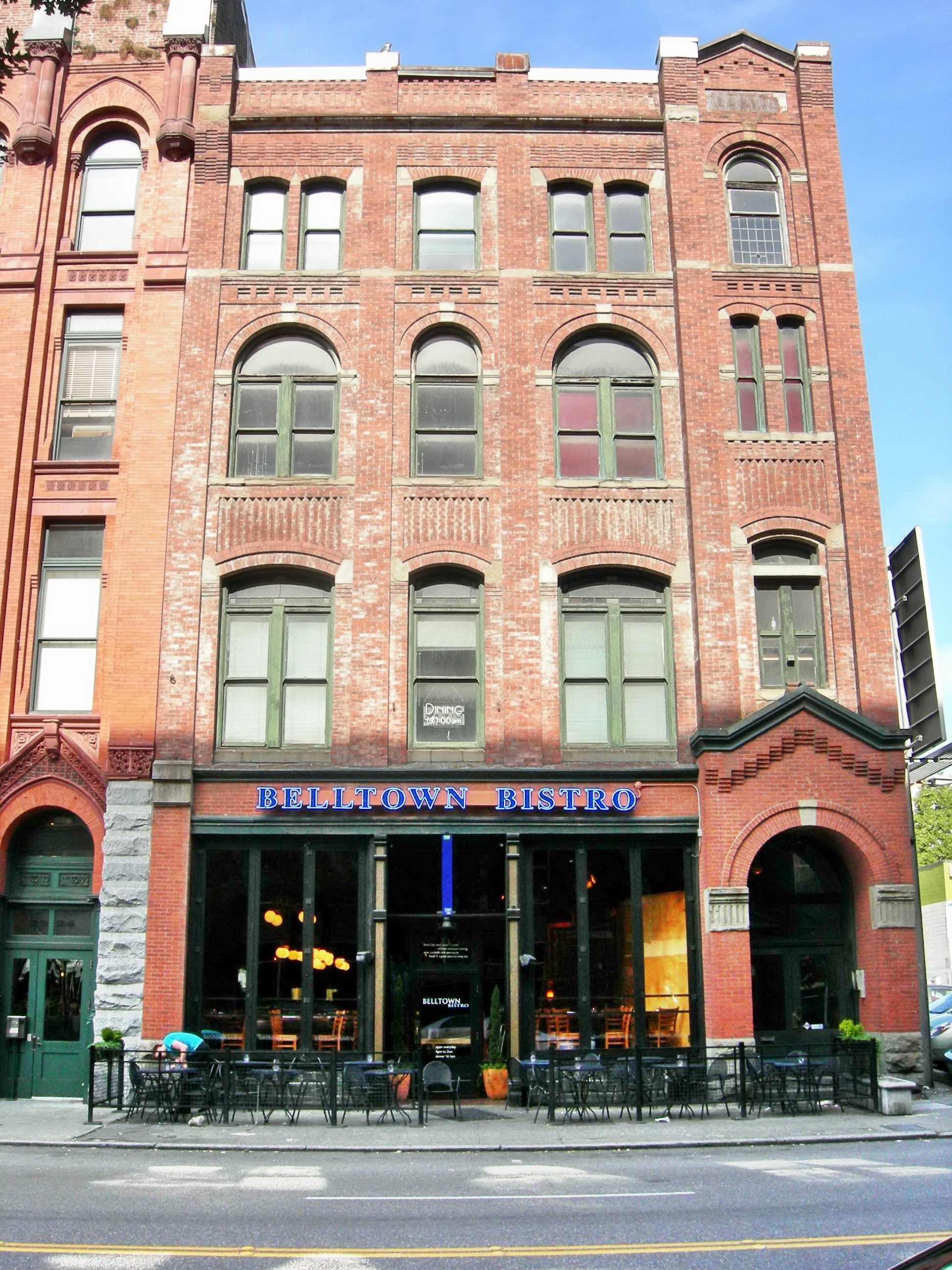
The Barnes Building (1890)

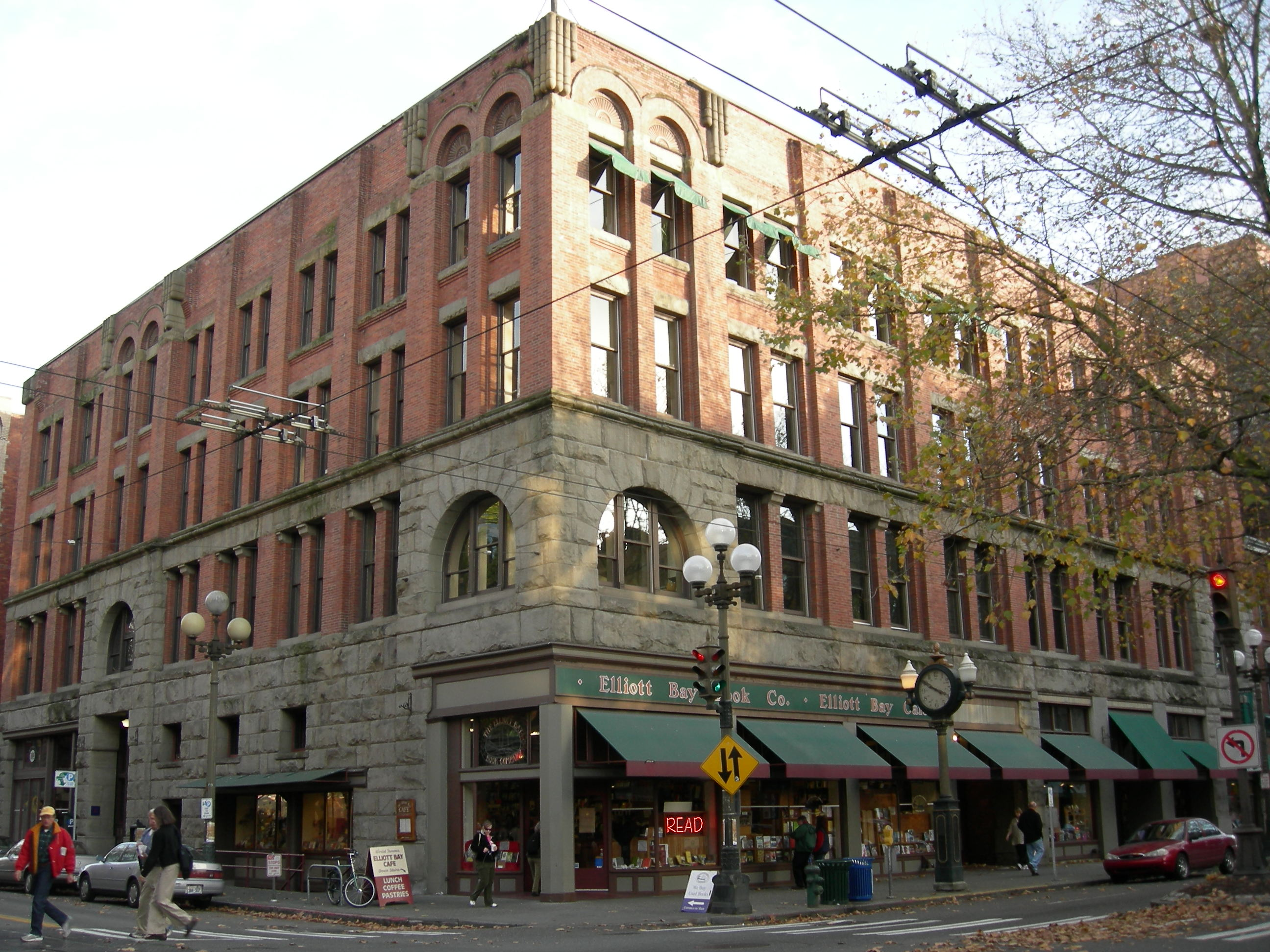
The Globe Building (1890–91)

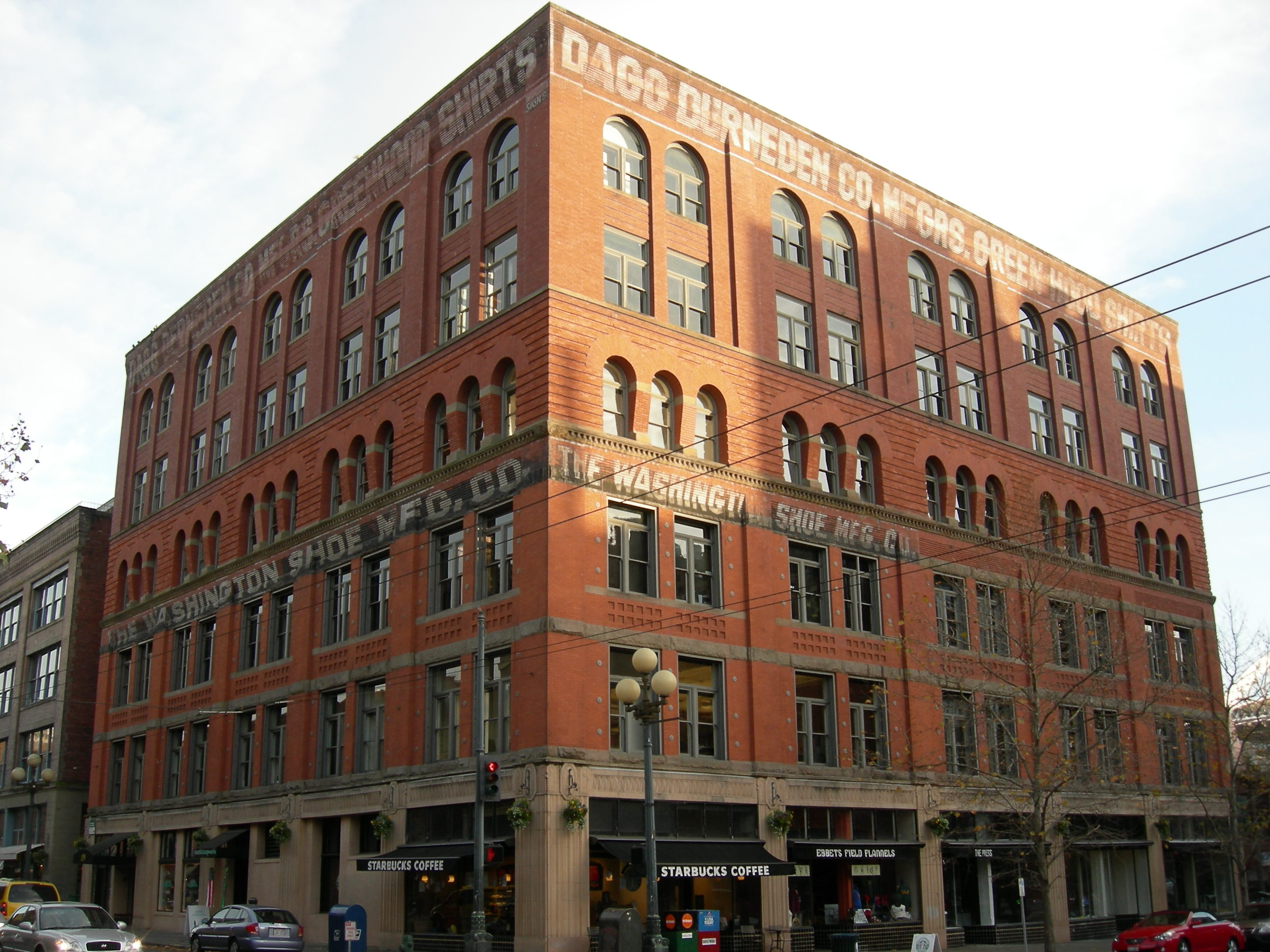
J.M. Frink (Now known as Washington Shoe) Building. The top 2 floors were a later addition

=== Boone and Meeker ===
- City Building (1882, Destroyed) – 3rd Street S. (now 2nd Ave S), Seattle
- Marshall Building (1882, Destroyed) – Commercial Street (now 1st Ave. S.), Seattle
- McNaught, Walker & Renton Building (1882–3, Destroyed) – Commercial Street (now 1st Ave. S.), Seattle
- Boyd & Poncin Building (1882, Destroyed) – Front Street (now 1st Ave.), Seattle
- Yesler – Leary Building (1882–3, Destroyed) – now NE corner of 1st Ave. and Yesler Way, Seattle
- Carliss P. Stone Block (1883, Destroyed) – Front Street (now 1st Ave.), Seattle
- Schwabacher Building (1883, Destroyed) – Yesler Way West of 1st Ave., Seattle
- Henry Yesler House (1883–4, Destroyed) – 3rd, 4th, James and Jefferson Streets, Seattle
- Wah Chong Building (1883, Destroyed) – S. 3rd St., Seattle
- Annie Wright Seminary (1883–4, Destroyed) – 611 Division Ave., Tacoma
- Villard Reception Pavilion (1883, Destroyed) Seattle
- Watson C. Squire Building [Pacific House] (1883–4, Destroyed) – S. 2nd Ave & Main St, Seattle
- Seattle Safe Deposit Building (1884, Destroyed) – Front Street (now 1st Ave.), Seattle
- Eben A. Osborne House (1884, Destroyed) – 1124 4th Ave., Seattle
- Fred Gasch House (1884, Destroyed) - NE Corner 7th Ave & Union St, Seattle
- Bishop Paddock House (1884, Destroyed) – Division & Tacoma Streets, Tacoma
- Wilkeson & Kandle Building (1884, Destroyed) – Pacific near 11th, Tacoma
- Henry A. Atkins House (1884, Destroyed) - SW corner 4th Ave & Columbia St, Seattle
- Gordon Hardware Building (1884, Destroyed) – Front Street (now 1st Ave.), Seattle
- Washington College (1885, Destroyed) – 714 Tacoma Ave. S., Tacoma
- Territorial Insane Asylum (1886–7, Destroyed) – Steilacoom
- Toklas & Singerman Building (1887, Destroyed) – 1st Ave. and Columbia, Seattle
- Charles L. Denny House (1887, Destroyed) – Seattle
- Yesler Block (1887–8, Destroyed) – adjoining Yesler – Leary Building, Seattle
- I.O.O.F. Building [Barnes Building] (designed 1889, built 1890) – 2320–2322 1st Ave., Seattle
- South School (1888–9, Demolished) – Seattle

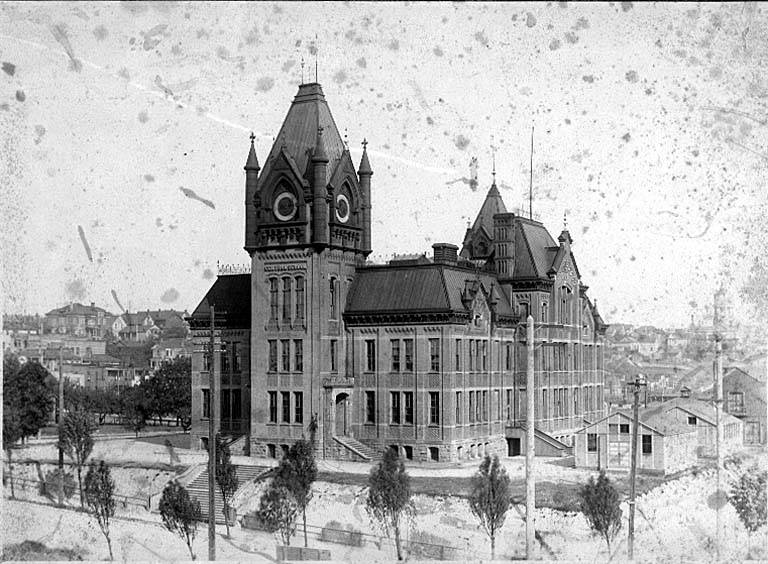
Central School (1888–89, demolished)

- Central School (1888–9, Demolished) – Seattle

=== William Boone ===
- Washington State Penitentiary (1873–4, Demolished) McNeil Island
- A.M. Brookes House (1887) Kinnear's Addition, Queen Anne, Seattle
- Mrs. Oren O. Denny Residence (1889, Demolished) 11th Ave & Seneca Street, Seattle
- Phinney Building [Carleton Block/Ramona Hotel] (1889, Demolished) – Seattle
- Sanderson Block [Merchants Cafe] (1889), Yesler Way, Seattle
- Wah Chong Building [Phoenix Hotel] (1889, Demolished) – 2nd Ave. S. and S. Washington Street, Seattle
- McNaught Building (1889, Destroyed) – S.E. corner of Second S. at Washington, Seattle
- Seattle Block [Dexter Horton Building] (1890, Demolished) – NW corner of 3rd & Cherry, Seattle
- Starr Block [Grand Pacific Hotel] (1890) - 1115-7 1st Ave, Seattle
- Sanderson Building (1890, Altered) - 409 2nd Ave Ext S, Seattle
- Post – Edwards Block [The Lusty Lady] (1890) 1315 1st Ave., Seattle
- Masonic Temple (1890–91, Demolished) Second and Pike Street, Seattle
- Marshall – Walker Building (1890–91) – 1st Ave. S. and Main, Seattle
- Leary – Walker Building (1893, Destroyed) – 2nd Ave., Seattle
- 3-story building for Cyrus Walker (1899, Destroyed) – NW corner of 2nd & Spring, Seattle
- Addition of second floor to building for H.C. Henry (1900, Altered) - 119 Jackson St, Seattle

=== Boone and Willcox ===
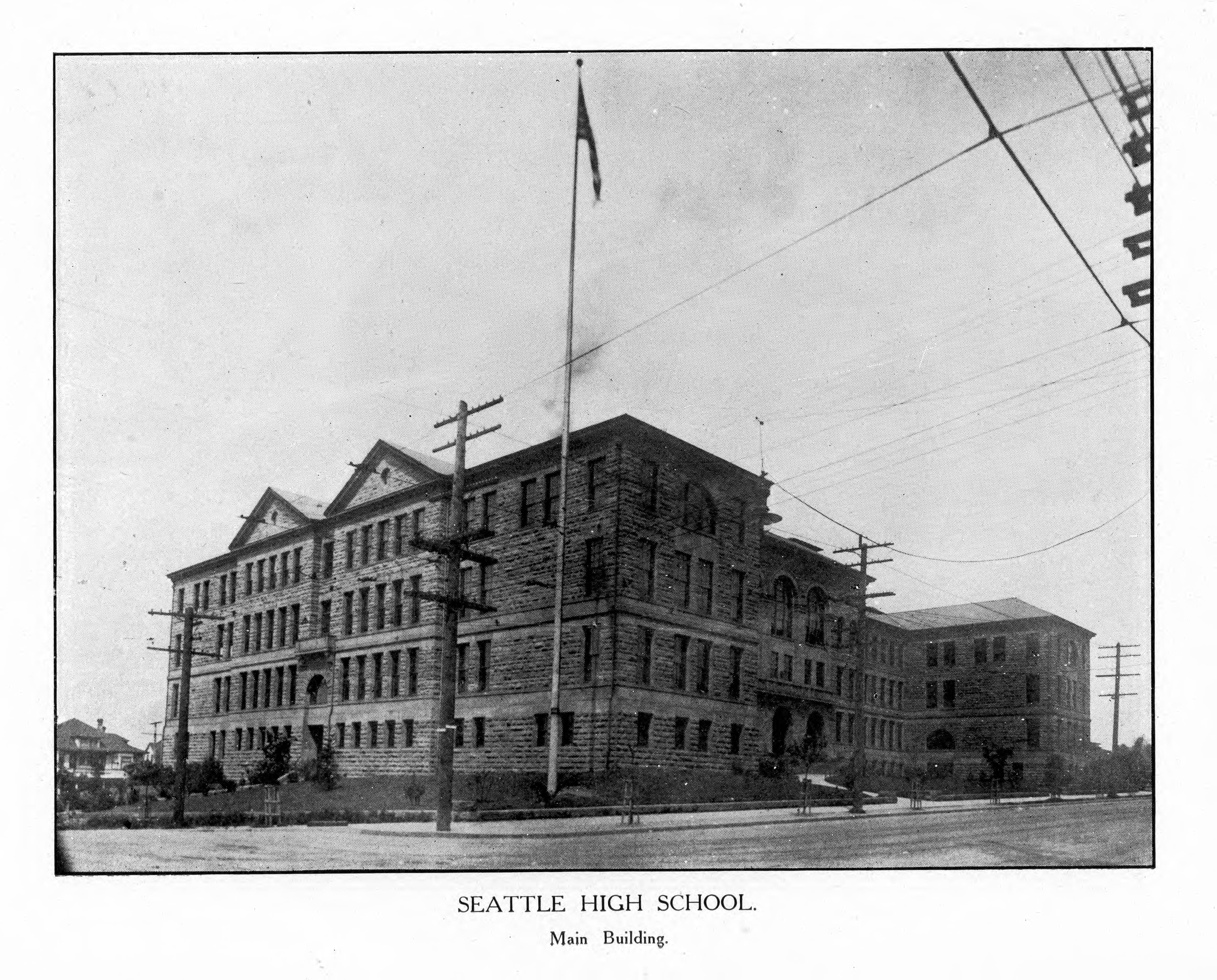
Seattle High School, one of Boone's last commissions

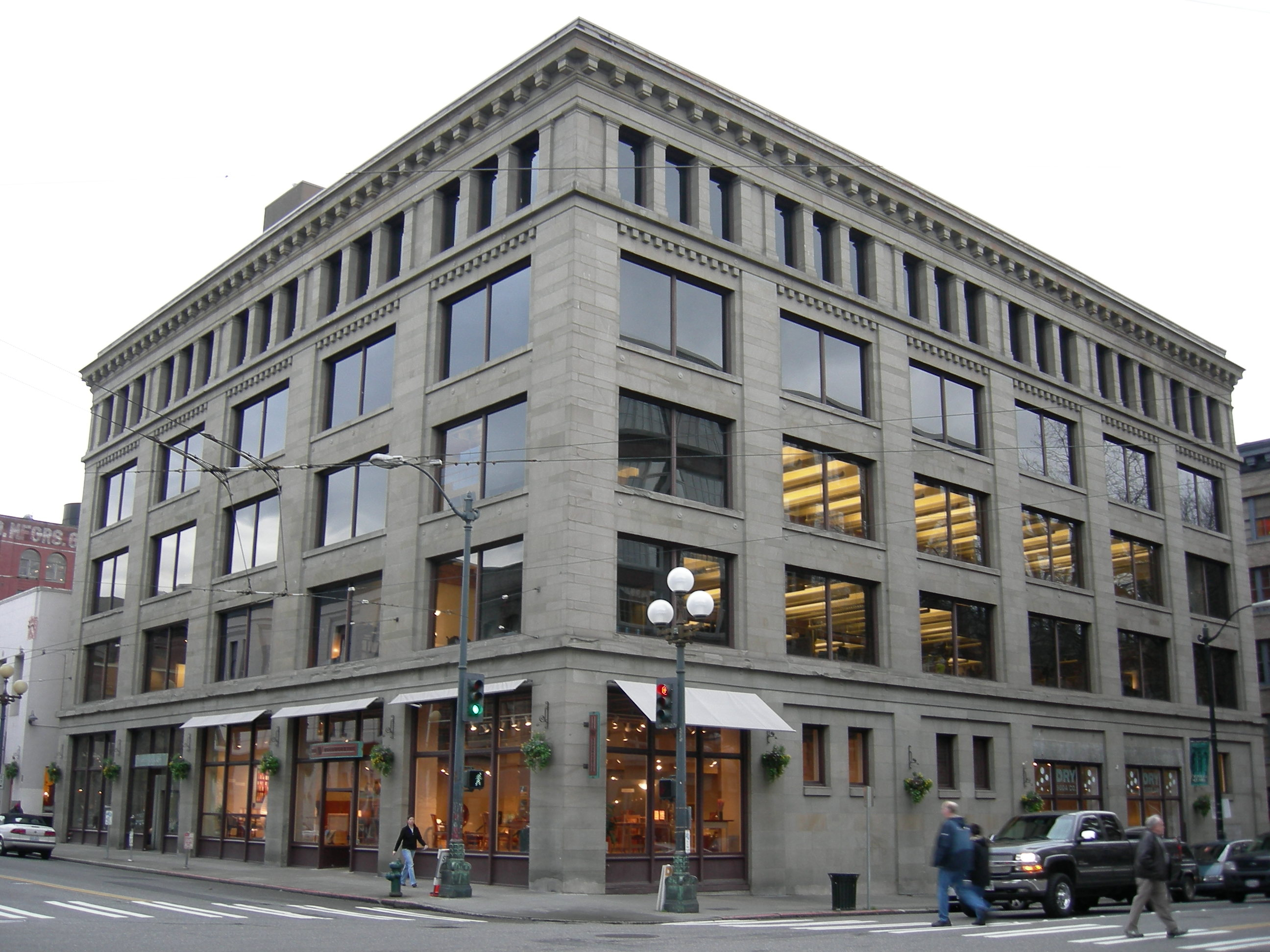
The Heritage Building (1904), one of several designed for lumber Baron Cyrus Walker

- New York Block (1890–92, Demolished) – NE Corner of 2nd & Cherry, Seattle
- McKenney Block (1890–91, Destroyed) – 4th & Capitol Way N., Olympia
- Baxter-Yesler Theater (1891, Unbuilt), SE Corner of Yesler & 3rd Ave S, Seattle
- St. Mark's Rectory (1891, Demolished) - Olive Way, Seattle
- Sander Block (1891, Altered) - 1012 1st Ave, Seattle
- John H. Sanderson House (1891, Destroyed) - 12th & Columbia, Seattle
- W.E. Armstrong House (1891, Unknown) - West Seattle
- Plymouth Congregational Church (1891–2, Destroyed) – 3rd & University, Seattle
- Walker Building (1891–2) [only 1 floor built] – 107 Occidental Ave S, Seattle
- J.M. Frink Building [Washington Shoe Building] (1891–2) – SE Corner of Occidental and Jackson, Seattle

=== Boone and Corner ===
- Seattle High School (Designed 1899, built 1900–3, became Broadway High School, a vocational school for WWII vets, and the campus is now part of a Seattle Central College. Demolished in the 1970s; surviving auditorium the Broadway Performance Hall was designed by Edgar Blair) – 1625 Broadway, Seattle
- Chapin Building 1 (1900, Demolished) - 1420-34 2nd Ave, Seattle
- Chapin Building 2 (1901) - 171 S Jackson St., Seattle
- Chapin Building 3 [Pythian Building] (1901) - 1423 1st Ave at Pike Place, Seattle
- Seater & Munro Building [Palace Hotel] (1901–2, Demolished) - 912 1st Ave, Seattle
- Longfellow Public School (1902, Demolished) - 2000 E Thomas St, Seattle
- Residence for Judge Julius A. Stratton (1902) - Denny-Blaine Addition, Seattle
- Cyrus Walker Building (1902, Demolished) - NE Corner 2nd Ave and University St, Seattle
- Pacific Drug Company [U.S. Rubber Building] (1902) - 319 3rd Ave S, Seattle
- Cyrus Walker Building (Adding 2 floors) (1902, Demolished) - 1101 2nd Ave, Seattle
- Stewart & Holmes Building (1903–4) - 207-11 3rd Ave S, Seattle
- Erickson Building [Shirley Hotel] (1904) - 1514 5th Ave, Seattle
- Talbot & Walker Building [Heritage Building] (1904) - 101 S Jackson St., Seattle
- Walker Block [Seattle Quilt Building] (1904) – 316 1st Ave. S, Seattle
