= Fred G. McCune =

American architect

Fred G. McCune was an architect based in Wichita, Kansas. Born in Corydon, Iowa, he graduated from Architecture College where he was working as a carpenter. In 1884 he moved to Wichita, working for the Rock Island and Santa Fe railroad as a maintenance worker. In 1894, he began his own architecture business.

He was a member of the Wichita Chamber of Commerce as well as the Order of Elks and Knights of Pythias.

Several of his works are listed on the U.S. National Register of Historic Places.

S.S. Voigt, a noted architect of churches and schools, worked for McCune for a period, before forming his own firm.

Works by McCune (with attribution) include:

- Caldwell Carnegie Library, 13 N. Osage St. Caldwell, Kansas (McCune, Fred G.), NRHP-listed
- Kingman Carnegie Library, 455 N. Main Kingman, Kansas (McCune, Fred C.), NRHP-listed
- Stoner Apartment Building, 938-940 North Market Wichita, Kansas (McCune, Fred C.), NRHP-listed
- One or more works in Wichita Historic Warehouse and Jobbers District, Wichita, Kansas (McCune, Fred G.), NRHP-listed
