= Oddfellows Hall (Seattle) =

Historic building in Seattle, Washington, U.S.

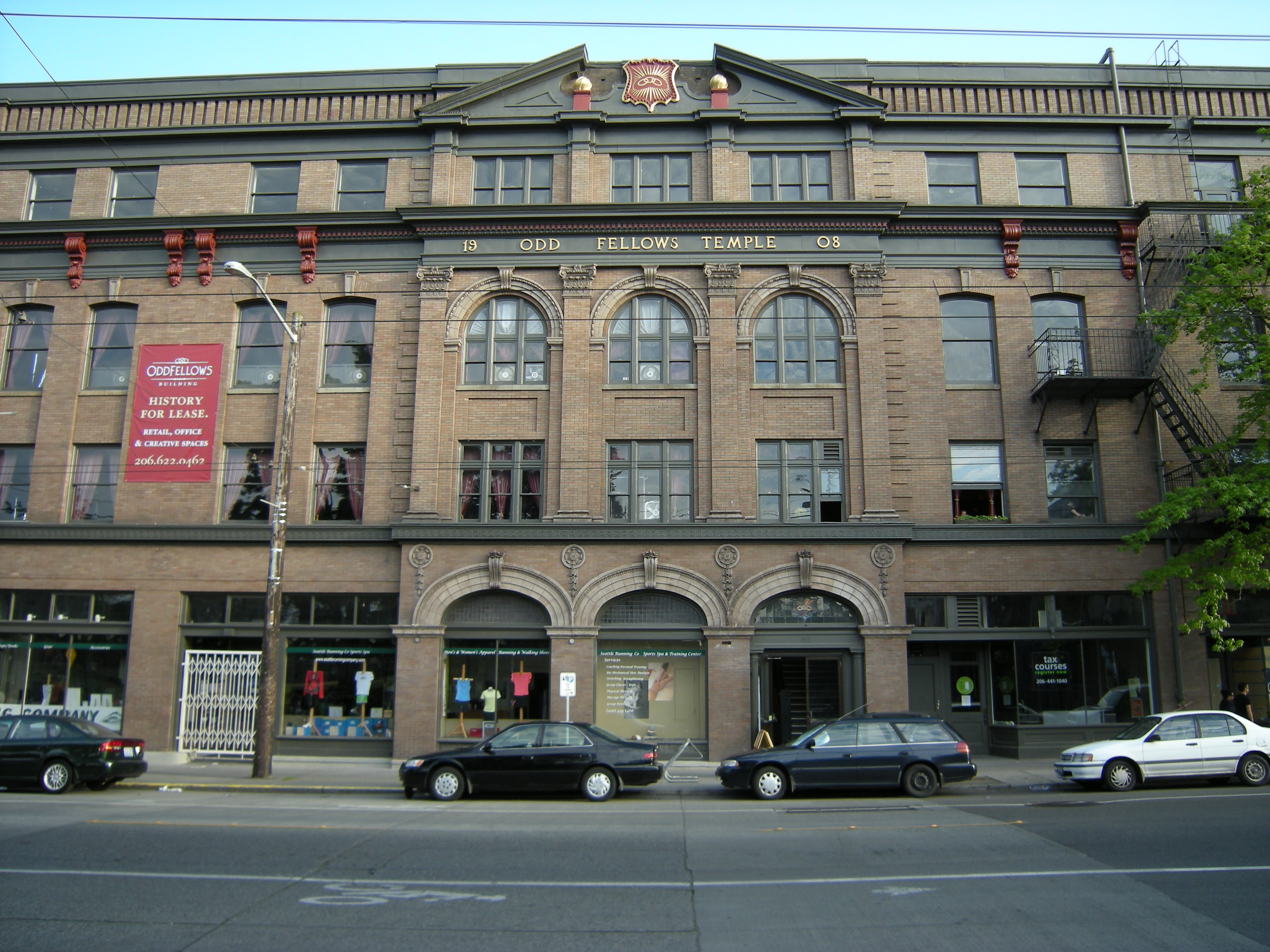
- Building in 2008

- Location within Downtown Seattle
- 47.6150°N 122.3197°W
- Location: East Pine Street and 10th Street, Seattle, Washington

History
- Built: 1908

Site notes
- Architect: C. A. Breitung
- Architectural style: Renaissance Revival

The Oddfellows Hall is a historic building in the Capitol Hill neighborhood of Seattle, Washington, built in 1908. It is located at East Pine Street and 10th Avenue, near Broadway.

In 2007, it had long served as "a cultural nucleus and point of convergence for community and arts organizations", but its continued status in that capacity was in question. As of November 2016, the only continuing art organization there was the Century Ballroom. It has housed the restaurants Oddfellows Cafe and Bar as well as Tin Table.
