= Belleville High School (Belleville, Kansas) =

- U.S. National Register of Historic Places
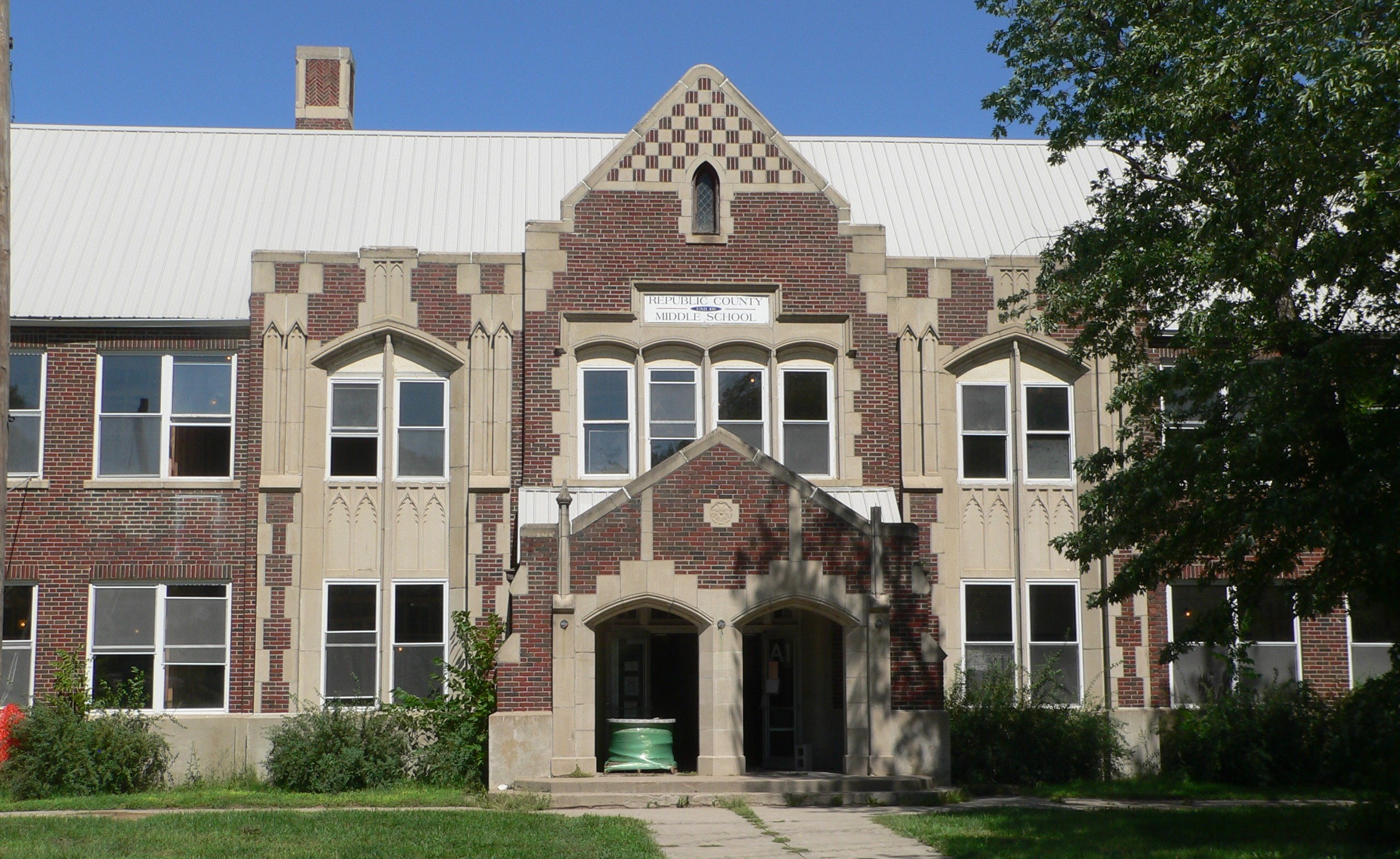
- Central portion of building, seen from across 18th Street

- Location within Kansas Location within the United States
- Location: 915 W. 18th St., Belleville, Kansas, U.S.
- Coordinates: 39°49′28″N 97°38′02″W
- Built: 1931
- Architect: S.S. Voigt
- NRHP reference No.: 13000434
- Added to NRHP: June 25, 2013

Belleville High School, later Republic County Middle School, is a school building constructed in 1931 in Belleville, Kansas. Architect S. S. Voigt designed the school in the Collegiate Gothic style. The red brick building features a limestone foundation and detail work, multiple gable roofs and gabled dormers, and windows with quoined surrounds.

The building served as Belleville's high school until 1962, then as the city's junior high school and middle school. At the end of the 2012–2013 school year, the school was closed and the property sold to a private developer, who declared his intention to convert it to an apartment complex dubbed Buffalo Apartments.

The school was added to the National Register of Historic Places on June 25, 2013.
