= Heisley =

Heisley is a surname. Notable people with the surname include:

- Michael Heisley (1937–2014), American businessman and sports owner
- Newt Heisley (1920–2009), American graphic designer

== See also ==
- Heisler
- Hensley (surname)
