= List of ministers of the Universal Life Church =

The Universal Life Church (or ULC) is a religious organization that offers anyone semi-immediate ordination as a ULC minister free of charge. The organization states that anyone can become a minister immediately, without having to go through the pre-ordination process required by other religious faiths. The ordination application, however, must be checked by a human in order to be official; therefore, true ordination usually takes a few days. The ULC's ordinations are issued in the belief that all people are already ordained by God and that the ULC is merely recognizing this fact.

The following is a list of notable people who have been ordained as ministers in the Universal Life Church.

== A ==
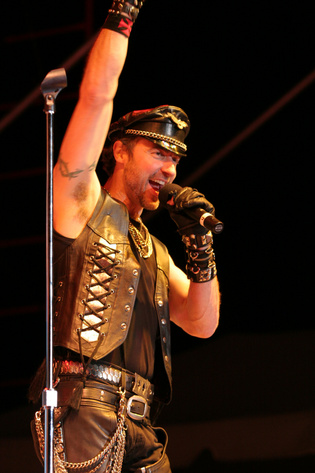
Eric Anzalone

Name	Known for	Citations
Adele	Singer/songwriter	
Eric Anzalone	Singer/actor/author member of the Village People	
Lewis Ashmore	Author	

== B ==
Name	Known for	Citations
Glenn Beck	American conservative political commentator	
Susan Block	American sexologist, author, filmmaker, therapist, cable TV talk show host and cultural commentator	
Richard Branson	English businessman, investor and founder of Virgin Group	
David Byrne	Scottish musician, and a founding member and principal songwriter of the American new wave band Talking Heads	

== C ==
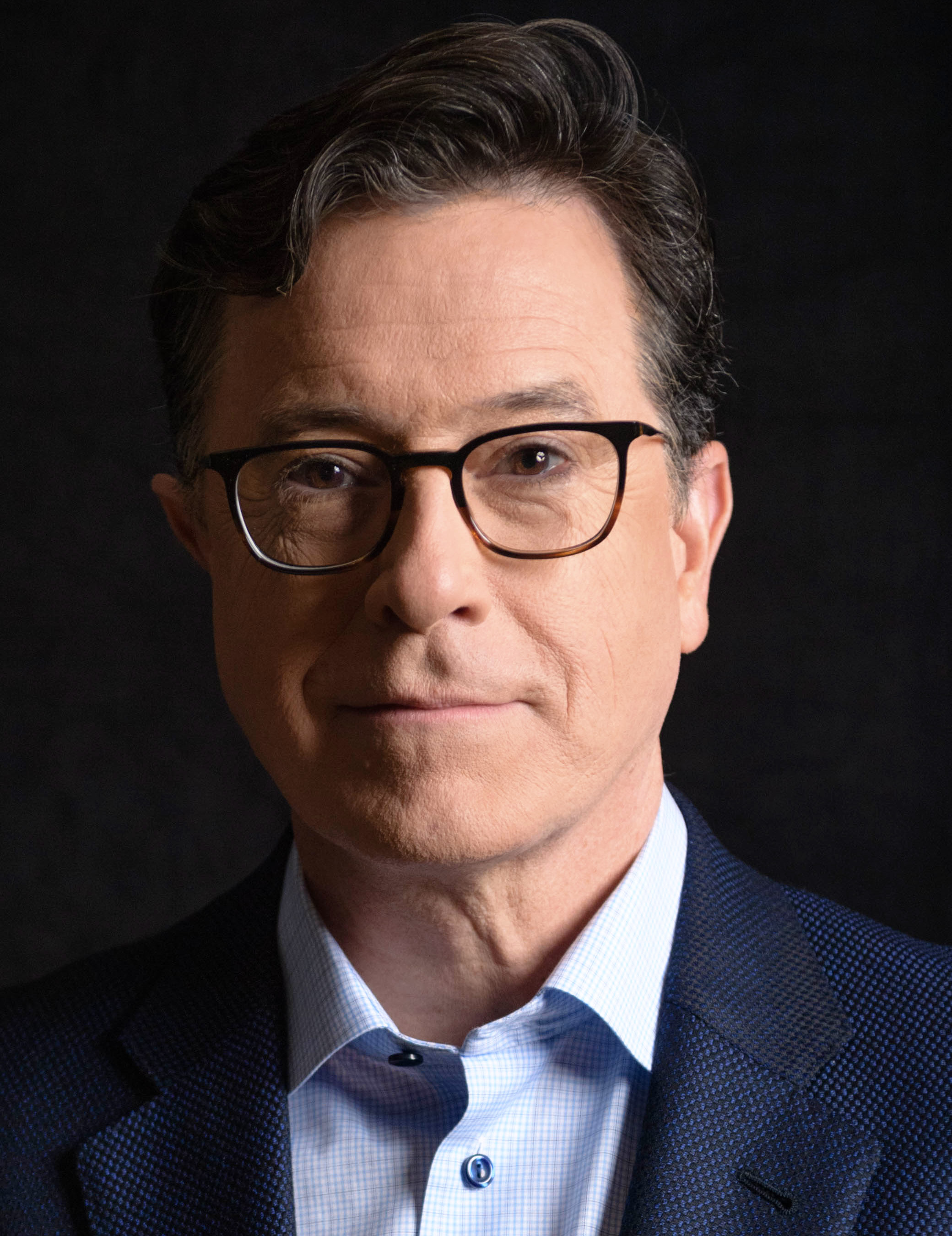
Stephen Colbert

Name	Known for	Citations
Cyd Charisse	American actress and dancer	
Stephen Colbert	American comedian, writer, producer, actor, media critic, and television host	
Bryan Cranston	American actor	
Benedict Cumberbatch	Actor from the United Kingdom of Great Britain and Northern Ireland	

== D ==
Name	Known for	Citations
Tony Danza	American actor	
Michael Dowd	American lecturer	
John C. Dvorak	American columnist and broadcaster in the areas of technology and computing	
Rob Dyrdek	American professional skateboarder, actor, entrepreneur, producer, and reality TV star.	

== E ==
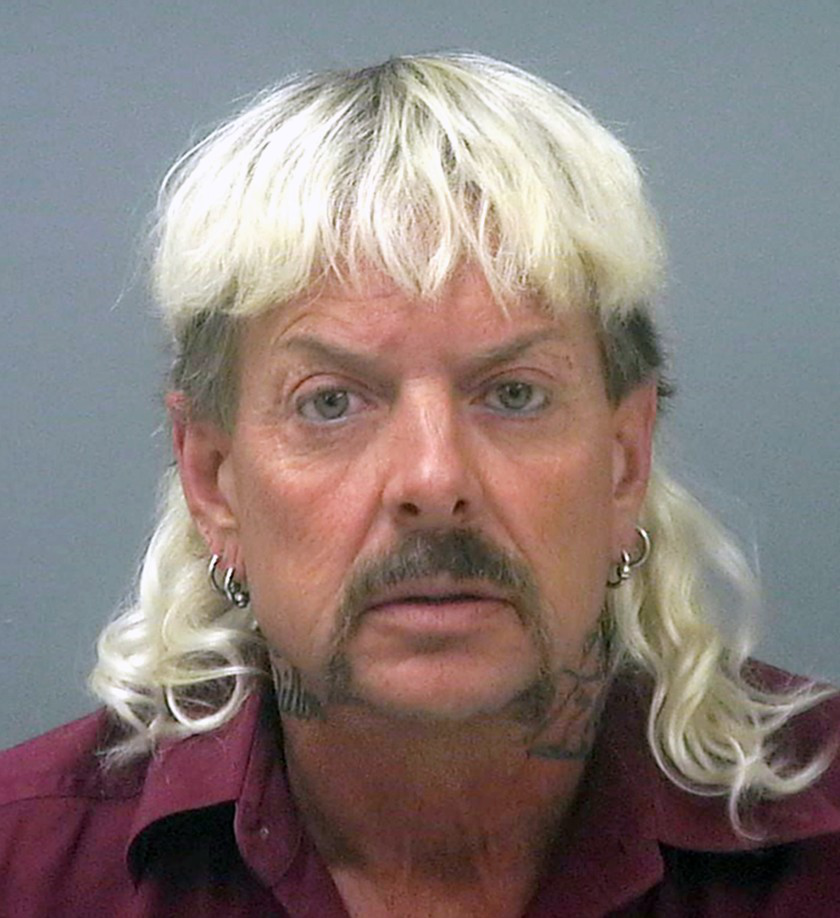
Joseph Maldonado-Passage

Name	Known for	Citations
Joseph Maldonado-Passage	American former zoo operator, convicted felon and focus of the 2020 documentary Tiger King.	

== F ==
Name	Known for	Citations
Andrew Barth Feldman	American actor and singer	
Guy Fieri	Chef and TV host	
Bobby Flay	Chef and TV host	

== G ==
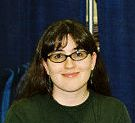
Shaenon K. Garrity

Name	Known for	Citations
Shaenon K. Garrity	American webcomics writer, artist and creator of Narbonic	
Jim Goad	American author and publisher	
Kathy Griffin	American actress, comedian, writer, producer and television host	
Jonathan Groff	American actor	

== H ==
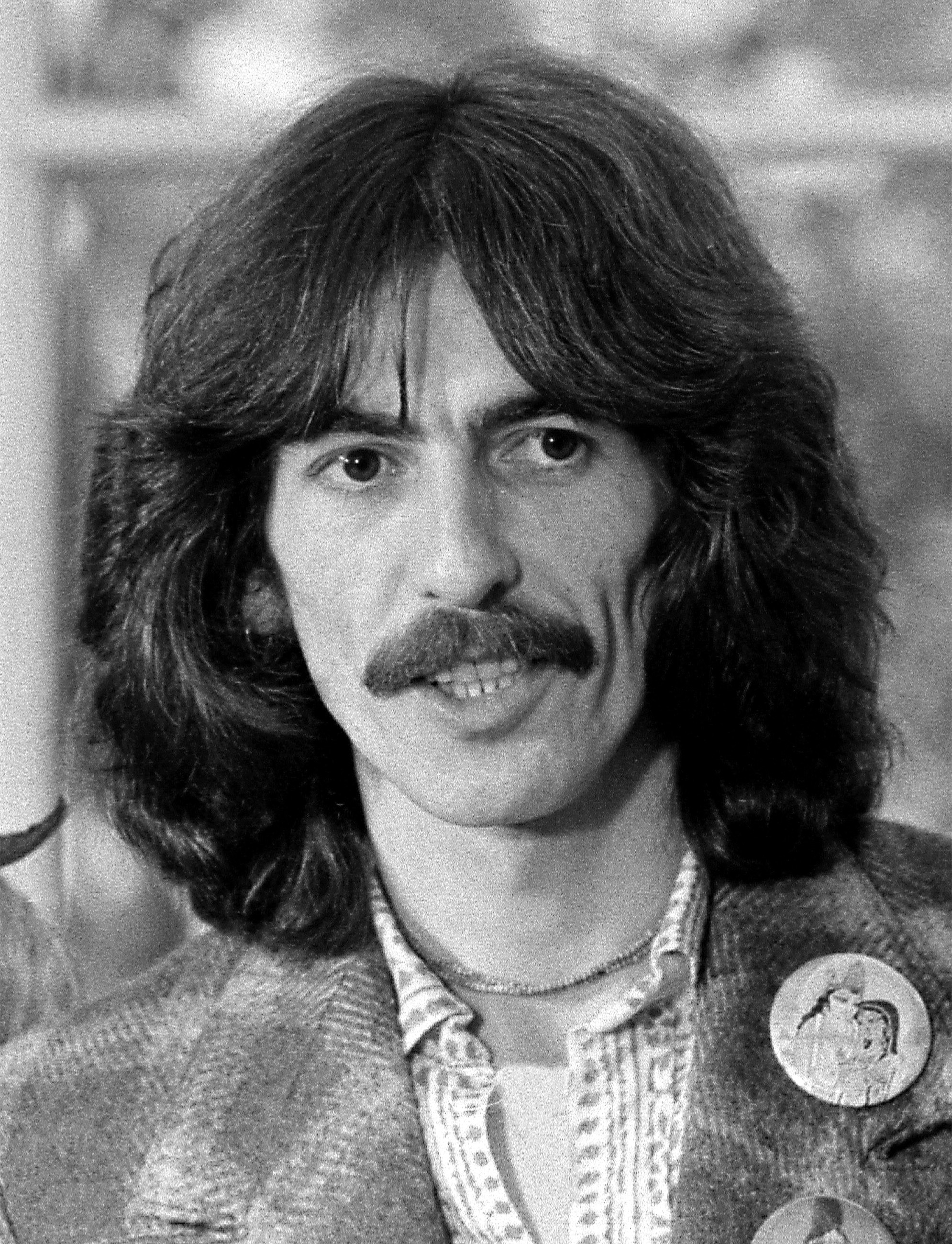
George Harrison

Name	Known for	Citations
Tom Hanks	Actor	
George Harrison	English musician, multi-instrumentalist, singer and songwriter, and music and film producer who achieved international fame as a member of The Beatles	
Andre Hensley	Third President of the Universal Life Church	
Kirby J. Hensley	Founder of the Universal Life Church	
Lida Hensley	Second President of the Universal Life Church	
Jonah Hill	Actor	
Jesse Hughes	American singer, musician and multi-instrumentalist. Frontman of the rock band Eagles of Death Metal.	

== J ==
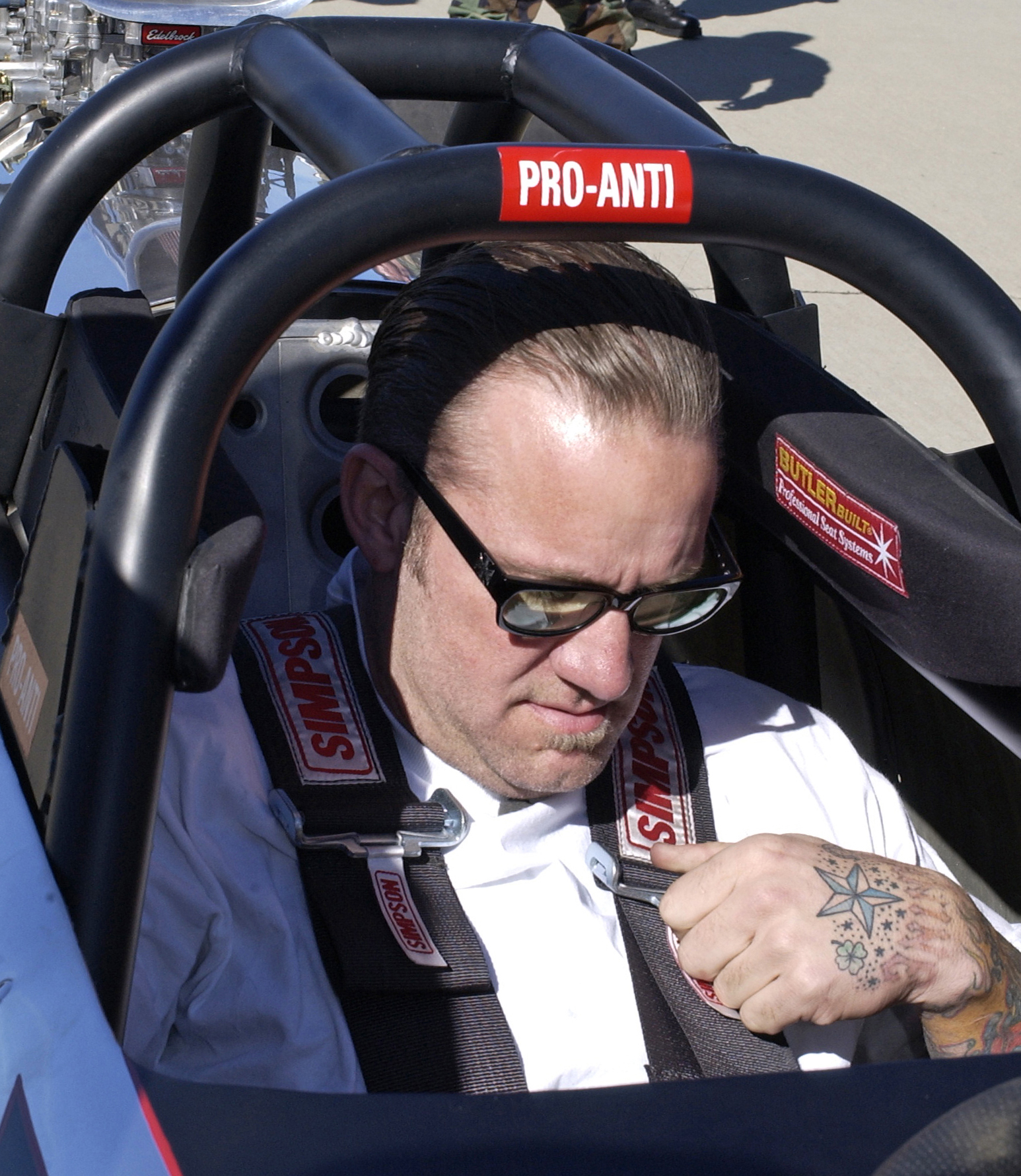
Jesse James

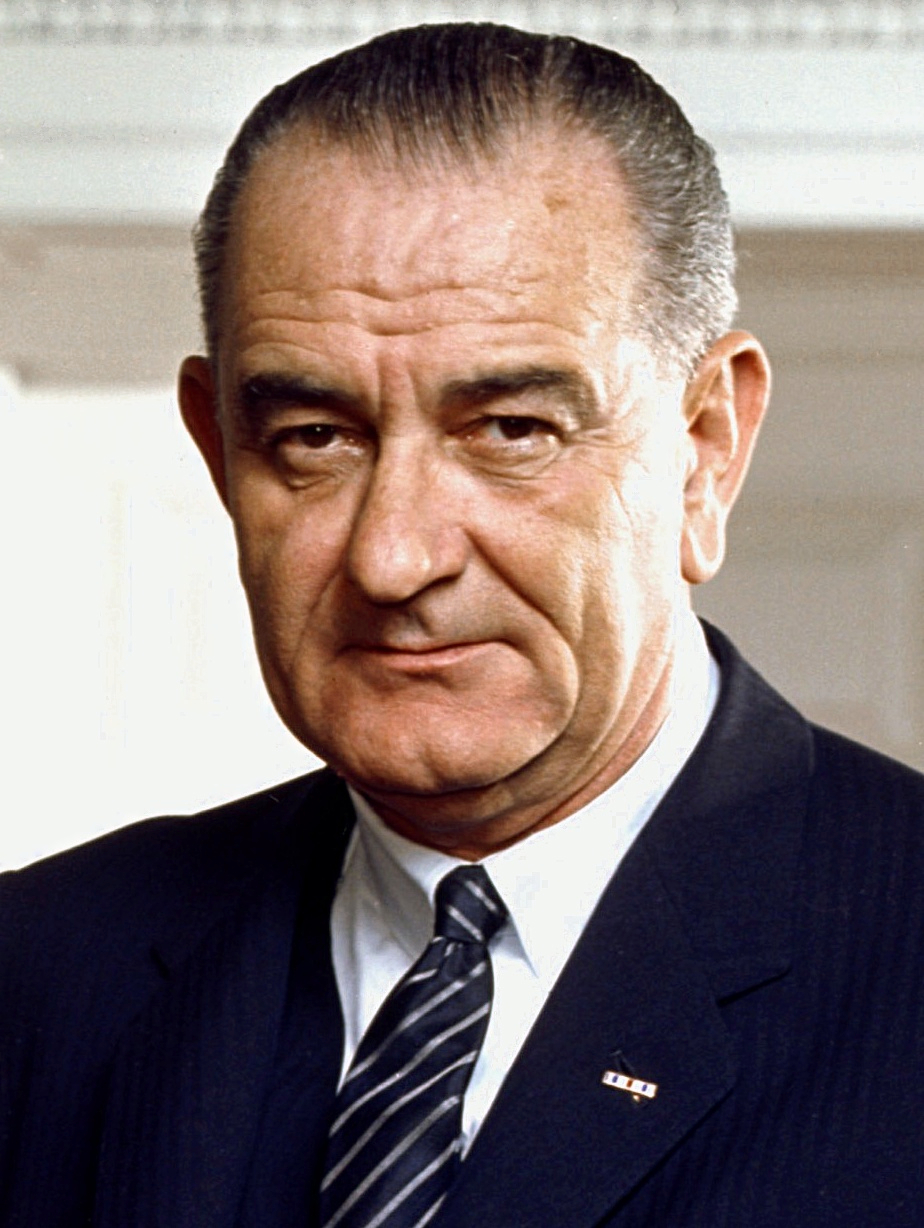
Lyndon B. Johnson

Name	Known for	Citations
Jesse James	American television personality and former CEO of Austin, Texas-based Austin Speed Shop	
Lindsay Jones	Voice actor, Achievement Hunter and on-screen personality at Rooster Teeth	
Dwayne Johnson	Actor and former professional wrestler	
Lyndon B. Johnson	Was the 36th president of the United States, serving from 1963 to 1969. He became president after the assassination of John F. Kennedy, under whom he had served as the 37th vice president from 1961 to 1963.	

== K ==
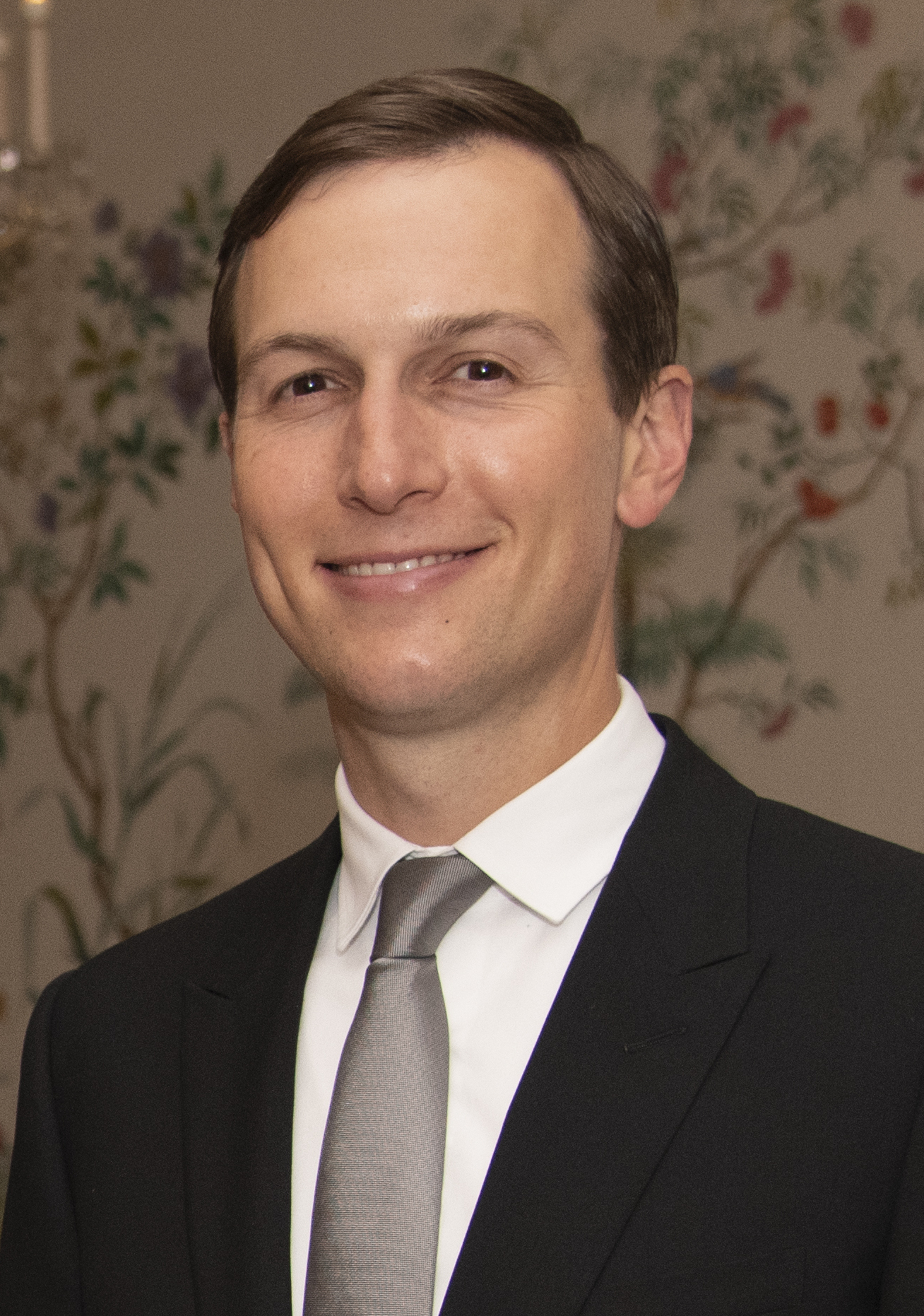
Jared Kushner

Name	Known for	Citations
Theo Katzman	American musician and member of Vulfpeck	
Jimmy Kimmel	TV host	
John Krasinski	Actor from America who played Jim Halpert on The Office	
Carson Kressley	American fashion expert with the television program Queer Eye for the Straight Guy	
Jared Kushner	Trump's Orthodox Jewish son-in-law claims to have been ordained; and a spokesperson for the ulc.org confirmed that Kushner is, in fact, ordained by ULC - according to usatoday.com	

== L ==
Name	Known for	Citations
Lady Gaga	American singer and songwriter	
Leo Laporte	American technology broadcaster, author and entrepreneur	
John Lennon	English musician, singer and songwriter who rose to worldwide fame as a founding member of the rock band The Beatles	
Courtney Love	American alternative rock singer, songwriter, musician, actress, visual artist, and widow of Kurt Cobain	
Theodore Lotherington	Founding member of noise rock band Nirvana If They Were Good	

== M ==
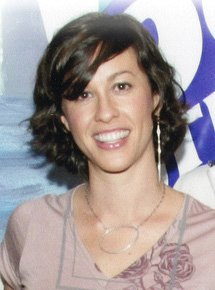
Alanis Morissette

Name	Known for	Citations
Paul McCartney	English singer, multi-instrumentalist and composer who gained worldwide fame as a member of The Beatles	
Fancy Ray McCloney	Stand-up comedian	
Ian McKellen	English actor	
Alanis Morissette	Singer	

== N ==
Name	Known for	Citations
Michael Newdow	American Atheist, attorney and emergency medicine physician	
Gavin Newsom	American politician and current Governor of California	
Stevie Nicks	American singer-songwriter	

== O ==
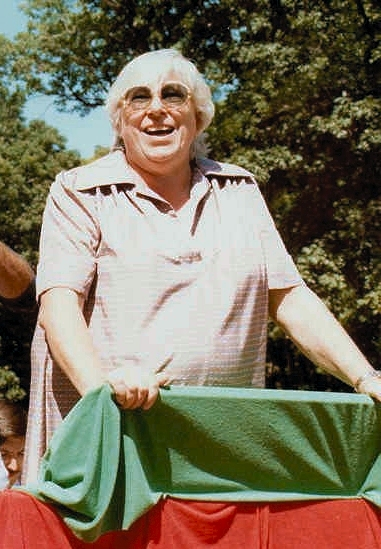
Madalyn Murray O'Hair

Name	Known for	Citations
Conan O'Brien	American television host, comedian, writer, producer and voice actor	
Madalyn Murray O'Hair	American atheist activist and founder of American Atheists, Inc.	

== P ==
Name	Known for	Citations
Mike Park	Korean American musician and progressive activist	
MatPat	American actor, writer, and YouTuber	
Anthony Perkins	American actor, director and singer ("Norman Bates" in Psycho, 1960, which established him as a horror icon)	
Jeff Probst	American game show host and an executive producer of Survivor.	

== R ==
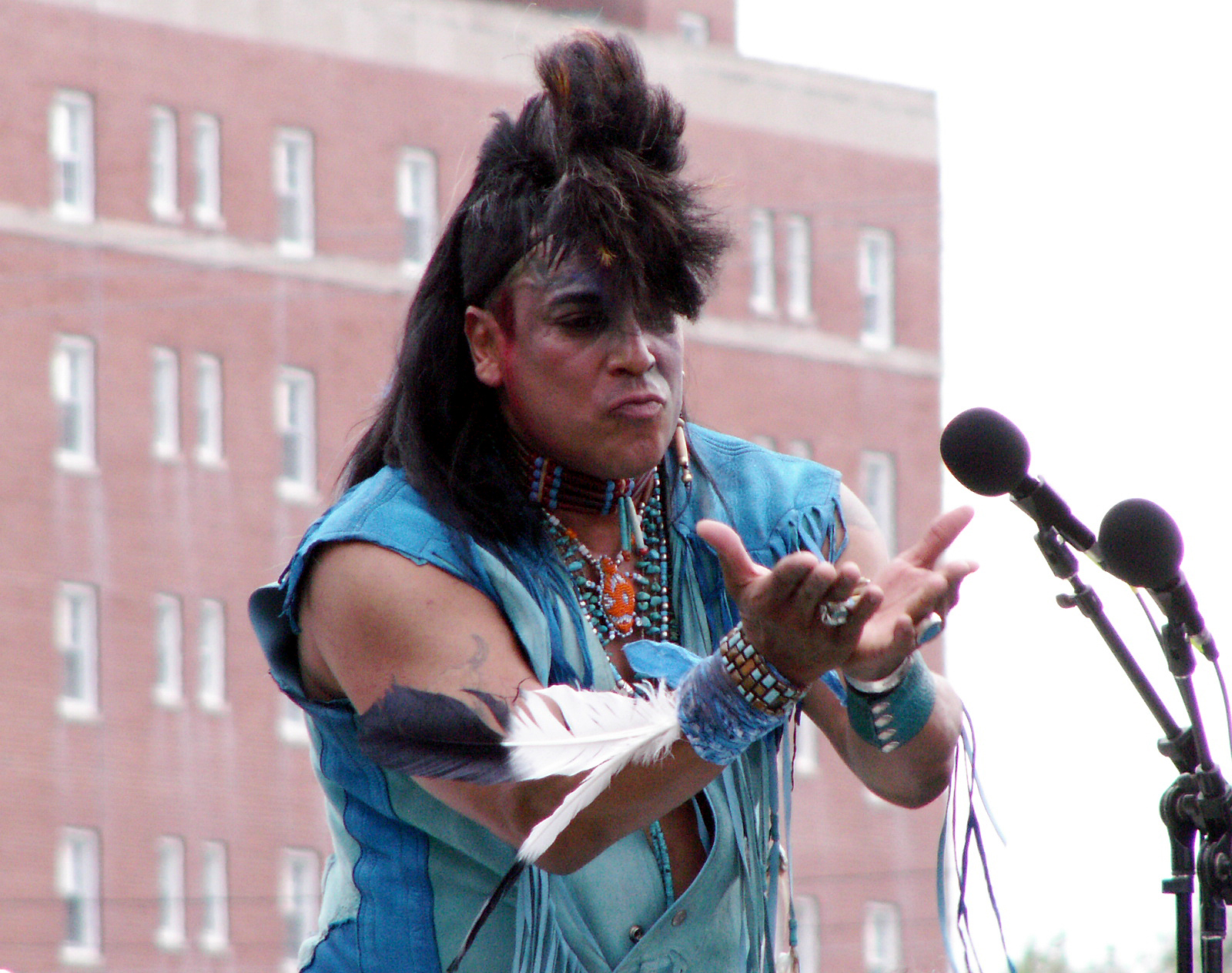
Felipe Rose

Name	Known for	Citations
Jerry Reinsdorf	American CPA, lawyer and an owner of the NBA's Chicago Bulls and the MLB's Chicago White Sox	
Joan Rivers	Actress	
Kyle Roche	American lawyer	
John Roderick	Lead singer and guitarist of the indie rock band The Long Winters, podcaster	
Felipe Rose	Founding member of the disco group the Village People	

== S ==
Homer Simpson uses the internet to become a minister.

Name	Known for	Citations
John Scalzi	American science fiction author, online writer, and former president of the Science Fiction and Fantasy Writers of America	
Jason Segel	American actor and comedian	
Michael Shermer	American science writer, historian of science, executive director of The Skeptics Society, and founding publisher of Skeptic magazine, a publication focused on investigating pseudoscientific and supernatural claims	
Homer Simpson	Homer (in The Simpsons) uses the internet to become a minister through a web page that he sees last, in one episode; ULC it's clearly alluded (due to the screen's "blue theme," which also features "dove emblem" above and "church emblem" below – compare with ULC websites from 2004)	
Kevin Smith	American screenwriter, actor, film producer, speaker and director, as well as popular comic book writer, author, comedian/raconteur and podcaster	
Gus Sorola	Video producer, actor and podcaster with Rooster Teeth	
Ivan Stang	American writer, filmmaker and broadcaster, and Sacred Scribe with the Church of the SubGenius	
Ringo Starr	English drummer, singer, songwriter and actor who gained worldwide fame as the drummer for The Beatles	
Mink Stole	Actress	
Sharon Stone	Sharon Stone is an American actress and film producer; she is the recipient of various accolades, including a Primetime Emmy Award, a Golden Globe Award, and a nomination for an Academy Award. She was named Officer of the Order of Arts and Letters in France in 2005 (Commander in 2021).	
Vermin Supreme	American performance artist and activist	
Ron Suresha	American author and activist	

== T ==
Name	Known for	Citations
George Takei	American actor, director, author, and activist	
Mickey Thomas	American singer for Starship	

== V ==
Name	Known for	Citations
Vanilla Ice	American rapper, actor and television host	

== W ==
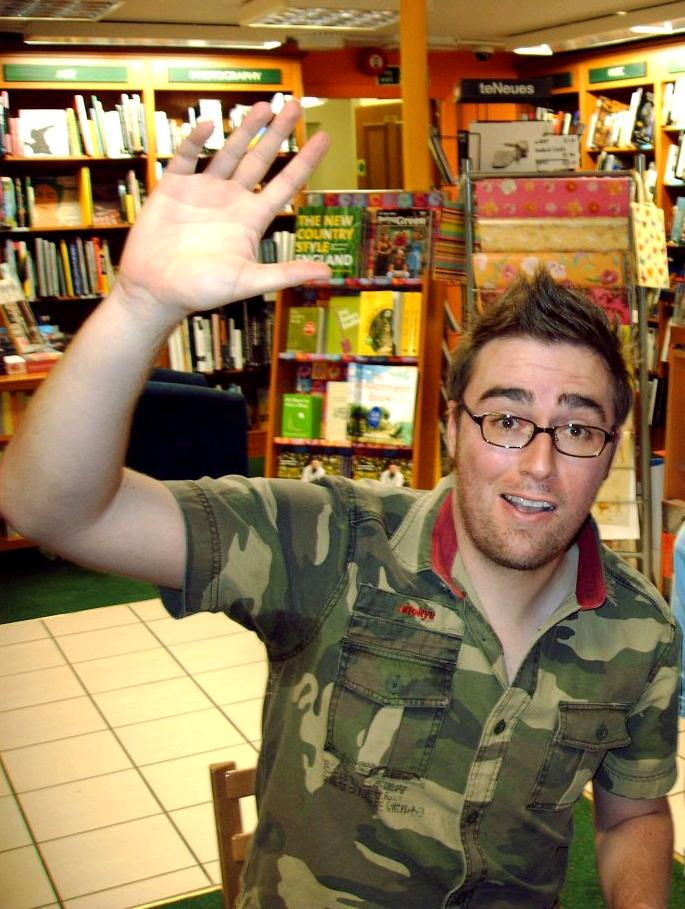
Danny Wallace

Name	Known for	Citations
Danny Wallace	British filmmaker, comedian, writer, actor and presenter of radio and television	
John Waters	American film director, screenwriter, actor, stand-up comedian, journalist, visual artist and art collector	
Jane Wiedlin	American musician, singer-songwriter and actress with The Go-Go's	
Mike Williams	American singer for Eyehategod and former associate editor for Metal Maniacs	
Wolfman Jack	American disc jockey	
