= 1964 United States presidential election in California =

- November 3, 1964
- Turnout: 88.38% (of registered voters) ▲0.06 pp 66.00% (of eligible voters) ▼2.77 pp

Nominee	Lyndon B. Johnson	Barry Goldwater
Party	Democratic	Republican
Home state	Texas	Arizona
Running mate	Hubert Humphrey	William E. Miller
Electoral vote	40	0
Popular vote	4,171,877	2,879,108
Percentage	59.11%	40.79%
County results
Johnson
50–60%
60–70%
70–80%
Goldwater
50–60%
President before election
Lyndon B. Johnson
Democratic
President-elect
Lyndon B. Johnson
Democratic

The 1964 United States presidential election in California took place on November 3, 1964, as part of the 1964 United States presidential election. State voters chose 40 representatives, or electors, to the Electoral College, who voted for president and vice president.

California voted for the incumbent Democratic President, Lyndon B. Johnson of Texas, in a landslide over the Republican nominee, Senator Barry Goldwater of Arizona.

As Johnson won nationally in a massive landslide, taking 61.05% of the vote nationwide, and dominating many Northeastern and Midwestern states by record landslide margins, California weighed in at about 4% more Republican than the national average in the 1964 election. Johnson dominated in liberal Northern California, breaking 60% in many counties and even breaking 70% in Plumas County and the city of San Francisco. However, the Western conservative Goldwater, from neighboring Arizona, appealed to residents of conservative Southern California, where Johnson failed to break his nationwide vote average in a single county. Goldwater indeed won six congressional districts in suburban areas of Los Angeles, Orange, and San Diego counties, and carried two heavily populated Southern California counties outright: Orange County and San Diego County, thus holding Johnson below the 60% mark statewide.

As of the 2024 presidential election, this is the last time that a Democrat has won the counties of Calaveras, Colusa, Glenn, Kern, Modoc and Tulare. Democrats would not win Marin County again until 1984 and Sonoma County until 1988. California as a whole, alongside Butte, Imperial, Riverside, Santa Barbara, Ventura, San Bernardino, San Luis Obispo, Monterey, San Joaquin, San Benito, and Saskiyou counties would not vote Democratic again until 1992 after which the state has always gone Democratic. Democrats would not win Nevada County again until 2008 and Inyo County until 2020.

California was Barry Goldwater's best state in the modern day "blue wall", which were states won by the Democrats in every presidential election from 1992 to 2012. Johnson was the only Democrat prior to 1992 to carry all of the states of that future "blue wall". This is also the most recent presidential election where Los Angeles County voted more Republican than the state as a whole, as well as the last in which California did not register the most votes cast by a state (New York had more).

== Results ==
Electoral results
Presidential candidate	Party	Home state	Popular vote		Electoral vote	Running mate		
Presidential candidate	Party	Home state	Count	Percentage	Electoral vote	Vice-presidential candidate	Home state	Electoral vote
Lyndon B. Johnson	Democratic	Texas	4,171,877	59.11%	40	Hubert Humphrey	Minnesota	40
Barry Goldwater	Republican	Arizona	2,879,108	40.79%	0	William E. Miller	New York	0
Write-in candidates	—	—	5,410	0.08%	0	—	—	0
Eric Hass	Socialist Labor	New York	489	0.01%	0	Henning A. Blomen	Massachusetts	0
Clifton DeBerry	Socialist Workers	New York	378	0.01%	0	Ed Shaw		0
E. Harold Munn	Prohibition Party	Michigan	305	0.00%	0	Mark R. Shaw	Massachusetts	0
Kirby J. Hensley	Universal Party	California	19	0.00%	0	Roscoe MacKenna		0
Total			7,057,586	100%	40			40
Needed to win					270			270

=== Results by county ===
County	Lyndon B. Johnson Democratic		Barry Goldwater Republican		Various candidates Other parties		Margin		Total votes cast
County	#	%	#	%	#	%	#	%	Total votes cast
Alameda	283,833	66.42%	142,998	33.46%	509	0.12%	140,835	32.96%	427,340
Alpine	91	42.33%	124	57.67%	0	0.00%	-33	-15.34%	215
Amador	3,410	66.89%	1,682	32.99%	6	0.12%	1,728	33.90%	5,098
Butte	20,831	51.54%	19,574	48.43%	14	0.03%	1,257	3.11%	40,419
Calaveras	3,145	58.27%	2,244	41.58%	8	0.15%	901	16.69%	5,397
Colusa	2,790	60.57%	1,811	39.32%	5	0.11%	979	21.25%	4,606
Contra Costa	113,071	63.44%	65,011	36.47%	163	0.09%	48,060	26.97%	178,245
Del Norte	3,652	63.77%	2,075	36.23%	0	0.00%	1,577	27.54%	5,727
El Dorado	8,810	60.30%	5,775	39.53%	25	0.17%	3,035	20.77%	14,610
Fresno	89,375	65.57%	46,792	34.33%	141	0.10%	42,583	31.24%	136,308
Glenn	3,937	54.01%	3,351	45.97%	2	0.02%	586	8.04%	7,290
Humboldt	25,515	66.27%	12,909	33.53%	75	0.20%	12,606	32.74%	38,499
Imperial	11,143	51.85%	10,330	48.06%	19	0.09%	813	3.79%	21,492
Inyo	3,161	53.44%	2,751	46.51%	3	0.05%	410	6.93%	5,915
Kern	64,174	58.71%	45,014	41.18%	120	0.11%	19,160	17.53%	109,308
Kings	13,073	69.39%	5,753	30.54%	14	0.07%	7,320	38.85%	18,840
Lake	4,680	56.37%	3,616	43.56%	6	0.07%	1,064	12.81%	8,302
Lassen	4,072	65.67%	2,124	34.25%	5	0.08%	1,948	31.42%	6,201
Los Angeles	1,568,300	57.43%	1,161,067	42.52%	1,551	0.05%	407,233	14.91%	2,730,918
Madera	9,391	67.75%	4,461	32.18%	10	0.07%	4,930	35.57%	13,862
Marin	46,462	61.65%	28,682	38.06%	220	0.29%	17,780	23.59%	75,364
Mariposa	1,704	57.41%	1,264	42.59%	0	0.00%	440	14.82%	2,968
Mendocino	11,869	65.12%	6,322	34.68%	36	0.20%	5,547	30.44%	18,227
Merced	19,431	68.74%	8,814	31.18%	24	0.08%	10,617	37.56%	28,269
Modoc	1,972	58.73%	1,386	41.27%	0	0.00%	586	17.46%	3,358
Mono	666	43.93%	850	56.07%	0	0.00%	-184	-12.14%	1,516
Monterey	40,093	61.83%	24,579	37.90%	172	0.27%	15,514	23.93%	64,844
Napa	19,580	62.74%	11,567	37.06%	63	0.20%	8,013	25.68%	31,210
Nevada	6,397	56.52%	4,899	43.29%	22	0.19%	1,498	13.23%	11,318
Orange	176,539	44.01%	224,196	55.89%	430	0.10%	-47,657	-11.88%	401,165
Placer	18,256	65.96%	9,389	33.92%	31	0.12%	8,867	32.04%	27,676
Plumas	4,019	70.35%	1,686	29.51%	8	0.14%	2,333	40.84%	5,713
Riverside	80,528	56.79%	61,165	43.14%	95	0.07%	19,363	13.65%	141,788
Sacramento	149,668	65.68%	77,871	34.17%	332	0.15%	71,797	31.51%	227,871
San Benito	3,779	60.59%	2,444	39.19%	14	0.22%	1,335	21.40%	6,237
San Bernardino	123,012	57.11%	92,145	42.78%	243	0.11%	30,867	14.33%	215,400
San Diego	211,808	49.69%	214,445	50.31%	33	0.00%	-2,637	-0.62%	426,286
San Francisco	230,758	71.24%	92,994	28.71%	156	0.05%	137,764	42.53%	323,908
San Joaquin	59,210	61.78%	36,546	38.13%	83	0.09%	22,664	23.65%	95,839
San Luis Obispo	22,252	59.84%	14,906	40.08%	28	0.08%	7,346	19.76%	37,186
San Mateo	140,978	64.32%	77,916	35.55%	297	0.13%	63,062	28.77%	219,191
Santa Barbara	48,381	55.94%	38,020	43.96%	85	0.10%	10,361	11.98%	86,486
Santa Clara	202,249	63.10%	117,420	36.63%	858	0.27%	84,829	26.47%	320,527
Santa Cruz	26,714	58.53%	18,836	41.27%	94	0.20%	7,878	17.26%	45,644
Shasta	19,142	67.52%	9,178	32.37%	30	0.11%	9,964	35.15%	28,350
Sierra	828	66.72%	413	33.28%	0	0.00%	415	33.44%	1,241
Siskiyou	9,126	63.66%	5,186	36.18%	23	0.16%	3,940	27.48%	14,335
Solano	34,930	69.53%	15,263	30.38%	47	0.09%	19,667	39.15%	50,240
Sonoma	44,354	61.49%	27,677	38.37%	105	0.14%	16,677	23.12%	72,136
Stanislaus	43,078	66.14%	21,973	33.74%	77	0.12%	21,105	32.40%	65,128
Sutter	6,787	48.33%	7,241	51.56%	16	0.11%	-454	-3.23%	14,044
Tehama	6,928	60.42%	4,529	39.50%	10	0.08%	2,399	20.92%	11,467
Trinity	2,175	63.25%	1,252	36.41%	12	0.34%	923	26.84%	3,439
Tulare	33,974	60.08%	22,527	39.83%	51	0.09%	11,447	20.25%	56,552
Tuolumne	4,939	63.16%	2,861	36.59%	20	0.25%	2,078	26.57%	7,820
Ventura	57,805	58.84%	40,264	40.99%	169	0.17%	17,541	17.85%	98,238
Yolo	18,266	69.52%	7,976	30.36%	32	0.12%	10,290	39.16%	26,274
Yuba	6,766	57.64%	4,964	42.29%	9	0.07%	1,802	15.35%	11,739
Total	4,171,877	59.11%	2,879,108	40.79%	6,601	0.10%	1,292,769	18.32%	7,057,586

==== Counties that flipped from Republican to Democratic ====
- Butte
- Calaveras
- Colusa
- Inyo
- Glenn
- Imperial
- Kern
- Lake
- Marin
- Mariposa
- Modoc
- Monterey
- Napa
- Nevada
- Riverside
- San Benito
- San Bernardino
- San Joaquin
- San Luis Obispo
- San Mateo
- Santa Cruz
- Santa Clara
- Santa Barbara
- Tehama
- Sonoma
- Tulare
- Yuba

=== Results by city ===
Official outcome by city and unincorporated areas of counties, of which Johnson won 370 and Goldwater won 80.
City	County	Lyndon B. Johnson Democratic		Barry Goldwater Republican		Margin		Total Votes
City	County	#	%	#	%	#	%	Total Votes
Alameda	Alameda	12,818	59.72%	8,645	40.28%	4,173	19.44%	21,463
Albany	Alameda	5,390	66.12%	2,762	33.88%	2,628	32.24%	8,152
Berkeley	Alameda	39,874	75.09%	13,228	24.91%	26,646	50.18%	53,102
Emeryville	Alameda	818	72.84%	305	27.16%	513	45.68%	1,123
Fremont	Alameda	16,754	62.97%	9,852	37.03%	6,902	25.94%	26,606
Hayward	Alameda	19,060	64.90%	10,308	35.10%	8,752	29.80%	29,368
Livermore	Alameda	5,474	55.24%	4,436	44.76%	1,038	10.47%	9,910
Newark	Alameda	4,150	68.48%	1,910	31.52%	2,240	36.96%	6,060
Oakland	Alameda	112,167	69.40%	49,458	30.60%	62,709	38.80%	161,625
Piedmont	Alameda	2,247	36.24%	3,953	63.76%	-1,706	-27.52%	6,200
Pleasanton	Alameda	1,148	57.00%	866	43.00%	282	14.00%	2,014
San Leandro	Alameda	19,618	63.90%	11,084	36.10%	8,534	27.80%	30,702
Union City	Alameda	1,865	80.84%	442	19.16%	1,423	61.68%	2,307
Unincorporated Area	Alameda	31,326	61.67%	19,473	38.33%	11,853	23.33%	50,799
Unapportioned Absentees	Alameda	10,695	63.85%	6,056	36.15%	4,639	27.69%	16,751
New Resident Vote	Alameda	429	66.10%	220	33.90%	209	32.20%	649
Unincorporated Area	Alpine	91	42.33%	124	57.67%	-33	-15.35%	215
Amador City	Amador	37	59.68%	25	40.32%	12	19.35%	62
Ione	Amador	448	64.09%	251	35.91%	197	28.18%	699
Jackson	Amador	637	71.98%	248	28.02%	389	43.95%	885
Plymouth	Amador	143	70.79%	59	29.21%	84	41.58%	202
Sutter Creek	Amador	442	65.00%	238	35.00%	204	30.00%	680
Unincorporated Area	Amador	1,478	65.46%	780	34.54%	698	30.91%	2,258
Unapportioned Absentees	Amador	223	73.84%	79	26.16%	144	47.68%	302
New Resident Vote	Amador	2	50.00%	2	50.00%	0	0.00%	4
Biggs	Butte	249	67.66%	119	32.34%	130	35.33%	368
Chico	Butte	3,347	51.19%	3,191	48.81%	156	2.39%	6,538
Gridley	Butte	758	57.38%	563	42.62%	195	14.76%	1,321
Oroville	Butte	1,771	54.56%	1,475	45.44%	296	9.12%	3,246
Unincorporated Area	Butte	13,682	50.77%	13,267	49.23%	415	1.54%	26,949
Unapportioned Absentees	Butte	1,010	51.50%	951	48.50%	59	3.01%	1,961
New Resident Vote	Butte	14	63.64%	8	36.36%	6	27.27%	22
Angels	Calaveras	470	68.61%	215	31.39%	255	37.23%	685
Unincorporated Area	Calaveras	2,445	56.77%	1,862	43.23%	583	13.54%	4,307
Unapportioned Absentees	Calaveras	226	57.51%	167	42.49%	59	15.01%	393
New Resident Vote	Calaveras	4	100.00%	0	0.00%	4	100.00%	4
Colusa	Colusa	849	63.08%	497	36.92%	352	26.15%	1,346
Williams	Colusa	334	62.43%	201	37.57%	133	24.86%	535
Unincorporated Area	Colusa	1,459	59.07%	1,011	40.93%	448	18.14%	2,470
Unapportioned Absentees	Colusa	143	58.61%	101	41.39%	42	17.21%	244
New Resident Vote	Colusa	5	83.33%	1	16.67%	4	66.67%	6
Antioch	Contra Costa	6,192	77.76%	1,771	22.24%	4,421	55.52%	7,963
Brentwood	Contra Costa	499	67.43%	241	32.57%	258	34.86%	740
Clayton	Contra Costa	159	56.58%	122	43.42%	37	13.17%	281
Concord	Contra Costa	13,491	66.17%	6,896	33.83%	6,595	32.35%	20,387
El Cerrito	Contra Costa	6,442	58.38%	4,593	41.62%	1,849	16.76%	11,035
Hercules	Contra Costa	77	53.47%	67	46.53%	10	6.94%	144
Martinez	Contra Costa	3,103	71.38%	1,244	28.62%	1,859	42.77%	4,347
Pinole	Contra Costa	1,961	60.49%	1,281	39.51%	680	20.97%	3,242
Pittsburg	Contra Costa	6,466	85.94%	1,058	14.06%	5,408	71.88%	7,524
Pleasant Hill	Contra Costa	4,730	59.74%	3,187	40.26%	1,543	19.49%	7,917
Richmond	Contra Costa	18,331	71.11%	7,448	28.89%	10,883	42.22%	25,779
San Pablo	Contra Costa	4,270	70.66%	1,773	29.34%	2,497	41.32%	6,043
Walnut Creek	Contra Costa	3,789	55.66%	3,018	44.34%	771	11.33%	6,807
Unincorporated Area	Contra Costa	38,859	57.20%	29,073	42.80%	9,786	14.41%	67,932
Unapportioned Absentees	Contra Costa	4,573	60.11%	3,035	39.89%	1,538	20.22%	7,608
New Resident Vote	Contra Costa	129	38.74%	204	61.26%	-75	-22.52%	333
Crescent City	Del Norte	564	59.18%	389	40.82%	175	18.36%	953
Unincorporated Area	Del Norte	2,876	65.45%	1,518	34.55%	1,358	30.91%	4,394
Unapportioned Absentees	Del Norte	199	55.90%	157	44.10%	42	11.80%	356
New Resident Vote	Del Norte	13	54.17%	11	45.83%	2	8.33%	24
Placerville	El Dorado	1,145	58.90%	799	41.10%	346	17.80%	1,944
Unincorporated Area	El Dorado	7,204	60.98%	4,610	39.02%	2,594	21.96%	11,814
Unapportioned Absentees	El Dorado	457	55.94%	360	44.06%	97	11.87%	817
New Resident Vote	El Dorado	4	40.00%	6	60.00%	-2	-20.00%	10
Clovis	Fresno	2,075	67.52%	998	32.48%	1,077	35.05%	3,073
Coalinga	Fresno	1,568	65.69%	819	34.31%	749	31.38%	2,387
Firebaugh	Fresno	457	75.91%	145	24.09%	312	51.83%	602
Fowler	Fresno	454	72.18%	175	27.82%	279	44.36%	629
Fresno	Fresno	39,427	68.34%	18,268	31.66%	21,159	36.67%	57,695
Huron	Fresno	186	84.16%	35	15.84%	151	68.33%	221
Kerman	Fresno	461	67.60%	221	32.40%	240	35.19%	682
Kingsburg	Fresno	812	57.59%	598	42.41%	214	15.18%	1,410
Mendota	Fresno	304	75.25%	100	24.75%	204	50.50%	404
Orange Cove	Fresno	452	76.87%	136	23.13%	316	53.74%	588
Parlier	Fresno	255	73.07%	94	26.93%	161	46.13%	349
Reedley	Fresno	1,421	55.73%	1,129	44.27%	292	11.45%	2,550
Sanger	Fresno	2,091	76.04%	659	23.96%	1,432	52.07%	2,750
San Joaquin	Fresno	136	66.67%	68	33.33%	68	33.33%	204
Selma	Fresno	1,464	65.53%	770	34.47%	694	31.07%	2,234
Unincorporated Area	Fresno	33,803	62.44%	20,332	37.56%	13,471	24.88%	54,135
Unapportioned Absentees	Fresno	3,964	64.16%	2,214	35.84%	1,750	28.33%	6,178
New Resident Vote	Fresno	45	59.21%	31	40.79%	14	18.42%	76
Orland	Glenn	648	56.10%	507	43.90%	141	12.21%	1,155
Willows	Glenn	1,020	59.79%	686	40.21%	334	19.58%	1,706
Unincorporated Area	Glenn	2,087	51.23%	1,987	48.77%	100	2.45%	4,074
Unapportioned Absentees	Glenn	176	50.87%	170	49.13%	6	1.73%	346
New Resident Vote	Glenn	6	85.71%	1	14.29%	5	71.43%	7
Arcata	Humboldt	1,329	69.65%	579	30.35%	750	39.31%	1,908
Blue Lake	Humboldt	338	74.61%	115	25.39%	223	49.23%	453
Eureka	Humboldt	6,879	65.17%	3,677	34.83%	3,202	30.33%	10,556
Ferndale	Humboldt	324	55.38%	261	44.62%	63	10.77%	585
Fortuna	Humboldt	891	63.60%	510	36.40%	381	27.19%	1,401
Trinidad	Humboldt	89	63.57%	51	36.43%	38	27.14%	140
Unincorporated Area	Humboldt	14,195	67.35%	6,881	32.65%	7,314	34.70%	21,076
Unapportioned Absentees	Humboldt	1,437	63.64%	821	36.36%	616	27.28%	2,258
New Resident Vote	Humboldt	33	70.21%	14	29.79%	19	40.43%	47
Brawley	Imperial	2,088	54.16%	1,767	45.84%	321	8.33%	3,855
Calexico	Imperial	1,215	67.35%	589	32.65%	626	34.70%	1,804
Calipatria	Imperial	306	59.42%	209	40.58%	97	18.83%	515
El Centro	Imperial	2,927	48.89%	3,060	51.11%	-133	-2.22%	5,987
Holtville	Imperial	585	54.88%	481	45.12%	104	9.76%	1,066
Imperial	Imperial	576	56.69%	440	43.31%	136	13.39%	1,016
Westmorland	Imperial	235	64.21%	131	35.79%	104	28.42%	366
Unincorporated Area	Imperial	2,737	47.77%	2,992	52.23%	-255	-4.45%	5,729
Unapportioned Absentees	Imperial	472	41.84%	656	58.16%	-184	-16.31%	1,128
New Resident Vote	Imperial	2	28.57%	5	71.43%	-3	-42.86%	7
Bishop	Inyo	629	48.99%	655	51.01%	-26	-2.02%	1,284
Unincorporated Area	Inyo	2,264	54.87%	1,862	45.13%	402	9.74%	4,126
Unapportioned Absentees	Inyo	268	53.39%	234	46.61%	34	6.77%	502
Arvin	Kern	880	69.02%	395	30.98%	485	38.04%	1,275
Bakersfield	Kern	15,230	56.62%	11,667	43.38%	3,563	13.25%	26,897
Delano	Kern	2,560	68.36%	1,185	31.64%	1,375	36.72%	3,745
Maricopa	Kern	164	68.05%	77	31.95%	87	36.10%	241
McFarland	Kern	555	65.84%	288	34.16%	267	31.67%	843
Ridgecrest	Kern	1,351	54.72%	1,118	45.28%	233	9.44%	2,469
Shafter	Kern	925	50.38%	911	49.62%	14	0.76%	1,836
Taft	Kern	1,049	57.23%	784	42.77%	265	14.46%	1,833
Tehachapi	Kern	760	63.65%	434	36.35%	326	27.30%	1,194
Wasco	Kern	1,547	66.42%	782	33.58%	765	32.85%	2,329
Unincorporated Area	Kern	36,470	59.08%	25,262	40.92%	11,208	18.16%	61,732
Unapportioned Absentees	Kern	2,595	56.17%	2,025	43.83%	570	12.34%	4,620
New Resident Vote	Kern	88	50.57%	86	49.43%	2	1.15%	174
Corcoran	Kings	1,083	66.24%	552	33.76%	531	32.48%	1,635
Hanford	Kings	2,958	69.18%	1,318	30.82%	1,640	38.35%	4,276
Lemoore	Kings	927	69.75%	402	30.25%	525	39.50%	1,329
Unincorporated Area	Kings	7,538	70.70%	3,124	29.30%	4,414	41.40%	10,662
Unapportioned Absentees	Kings	551	61.84%	340	38.16%	211	23.68%	891
New Resident Vote	Kings	16	48.48%	17	51.52%	-1	-3.03%	33
Lakeport	Lake	639	53.38%	558	46.62%	81	6.77%	1,197
Unincorporated Area	Lake	3,675	56.50%	2,830	43.50%	845	12.99%	6,505
Unapportioned Absentees	Lake	366	61.62%	228	38.38%	138	23.23%	594
Susanville	Lassen	1,929	68.45%	889	31.55%	1,040	36.91%	2,818
Unincorporated Area	Lassen	1,931	63.62%	1,104	36.38%	827	27.25%	3,035
Unapportioned Absentees	Lassen	207	61.98%	127	38.02%	80	23.95%	334
New Resident Vote	Lassen	5	55.56%	4	44.44%	1	11.11%	9
Alhambra	Los Angeles	14,234	47.68%	15,618	52.32%	-1,384	-4.64%	29,852
Arcadia	Los Angeles	7,218	31.01%	16,055	68.99%	-8,837	-37.97%	23,273
Artesia	Los Angeles	1,936	56.61%	1,484	43.39%	452	13.22%	3,420
Avalon	Los Angeles	370	51.60%	347	48.40%	23	3.21%	717
Azusa	Los Angeles	4,423	60.85%	2,846	39.15%	1,577	21.69%	7,269
Baldwin Park	Los Angeles	7,802	65.23%	4,158	34.77%	3,644	30.47%	11,960
Bell	Los Angeles	4,848	59.90%	3,245	40.10%	1,603	19.81%	8,093
Bellflower	Los Angeles	10,624	56.33%	8,236	43.67%	2,388	12.66%	18,860
Bell Gardens	Los Angeles	5,138	72.02%	1,996	27.98%	3,142	44.04%	7,134
Beverly Hills	Los Angeles	11,832	64.90%	6,399	35.10%	5,433	29.80%	18,231
Bradbury	Los Angeles	78	23.01%	261	76.99%	-183	-53.98%	339
Burbank	Los Angeles	20,606	49.00%	21,449	51.00%	-843	-2.00%	42,055
Claremont	Los Angeles	3,309	43.53%	4,292	56.47%	-983	-12.93%	7,601
Commerce	Los Angeles	2,449	81.99%	538	18.01%	1,911	63.98%	2,987
Compton	Los Angeles	21,213	79.68%	5,411	20.32%	15,802	59.35%	26,624
Covina	Los Angeles	4,932	43.67%	6,361	56.33%	-1,429	-12.65%	11,293
Cudahy	Los Angeles	2,249	63.50%	1,293	36.50%	956	26.99%	3,542
Culver City	Los Angeles	7,776	57.35%	5,782	42.65%	1,994	14.71%	13,558
Dairy Valley	Los Angeles	430	43.22%	565	56.78%	-135	-13.57%	995
Downey	Los Angeles	17,528	48.29%	18,770	51.71%	-1,242	-3.42%	36,298
Duarte	Los Angeles	2,722	54.07%	2,312	45.93%	410	8.14%	5,034
El Monte	Los Angeles	8,181	60.71%	5,294	39.29%	2,887	21.42%	13,475
El Segundo	Los Angeles	2,761	46.00%	3,241	54.00%	-480	-8.00%	6,002
Gardena	Los Angeles	8,367	55.64%	6,672	44.36%	1,695	11.27%	15,039
Glendale	Los Angeles	22,527	36.64%	38,948	63.36%	-16,421	-26.71%	61,475
Glendora	Los Angeles	4,481	40.64%	6,546	59.36%	-2,065	-18.73%	11,027
Hawaiian Gardens	Los Angeles	507	69.74%	220	30.26%	287	39.48%	727
Hawthorne	Los Angeles	8,748	53.14%	7,714	46.86%	1,034	6.28%	16,462
Hermosa Beach	Los Angeles	3,456	47.69%	3,791	52.31%	-335	-4.62%	7,247
Hidden Hills	Los Angeles	191	33.45%	380	66.55%	-189	-33.10%	571
Huntington Park	Los Angeles	7,108	55.29%	5,747	44.71%	1,361	10.59%	12,855
Industry	Los Angeles	94	55.62%	75	44.38%	19	11.24%	169
Inglewood	Los Angeles	17,387	45.75%	20,615	54.25%	-3,228	-8.49%	38,002
Irwindale	Los Angeles	212	83.14%	43	16.86%	169	66.27%	255
Lakewood	Los Angeles	18,825	58.07%	13,591	41.93%	5,234	16.15%	32,416
La Mirada	Los Angeles	5,012	49.16%	5,183	50.84%	-171	-1.68%	10,195
La Puente	Los Angeles	5,278	69.43%	2,324	30.57%	2,954	38.86%	7,602
La Verne	Los Angeles	1,579	52.69%	1,418	47.31%	161	5.37%	2,997
Lawndale	Los Angeles	3,898	59.96%	2,603	40.04%	1,295	19.92%	6,501
Lomita	Los Angeles	3,676	57.42%	2,726	42.58%	950	14.84%	6,402
Long Beach	Los Angeles	80,204	52.70%	71,997	47.30%	8,207	5.39%	152,201
Los Angeles	Los Angeles	696,234	64.50%	383,144	35.50%	313,090	29.01%	1,079,378
Lynwood	Los Angeles	7,791	54.46%	6,516	45.54%	1,275	8.91%	14,307
Manhattan Beach	Los Angeles	6,687	42.37%	9,096	57.63%	-2,409	-15.26%	15,783
Maywood	Los Angeles	3,541	63.06%	2,074	36.94%	1,467	26.13%	5,615
Monrovia	Los Angeles	5,991	47.02%	6,750	52.98%	-759	-5.96%	12,741
Montebello	Los Angeles	10,707	65.46%	5,650	34.54%	5,057	30.92%	16,357
Monterey Park	Los Angeles	11,418	59.41%	7,802	40.59%	3,616	18.81%	19,220
Norwalk	Los Angeles	17,027	65.24%	9,072	34.76%	7,955	30.48%	26,099
Palmdale	Los Angeles	1,511	50.35%	1,490	49.65%	21	0.70%	3,001
Palos Verdes Estates	Los Angeles	1,570	27.53%	4,133	72.47%	-2,563	-44.94%	5,703
Paramount	Los Angeles	5,789	64.00%	3,256	36.00%	2,533	28.00%	9,045
Pasadena	Los Angeles	25,897	47.44%	28,691	52.56%	-2,794	-5.12%	54,588
Pico Rivera	Los Angeles	12,251	68.55%	5,620	31.45%	6,631	37.10%	17,871
Pomona	Los Angeles	15,681	52.92%	13,953	47.08%	1,728	5.83%	29,634
Redondo Beach	Los Angeles	9,597	52.53%	8,672	47.47%	925	5.06%	18,269
Rolling Hills	Los Angeles	196	21.40%	720	78.60%	-524	-57.21%	916
Rolling Hills Estates	Los Angeles	672	28.80%	1,661	71.20%	-989	-42.39%	2,333
Rosemead	Los Angeles	3,787	55.63%	3,021	44.37%	766	11.25%	6,808
San Dimas	Los Angeles	1,838	50.08%	1,832	49.92%	6	0.16%	3,670
San Fernando	Los Angeles	3,491	60.52%	2,277	39.48%	1,214	21.05%	5,768
San Gabriel	Los Angeles	5,296	43.98%	6,746	56.02%	-1,450	-12.04%	12,042
San Marino	Los Angeles	1,241	15.97%	6,532	84.03%	-5,291	-68.07%	7,773
Santa Fe Springs	Los Angeles	3,314	70.87%	1,362	29.13%	1,952	41.75%	4,676
Santa Monica	Los Angeles	19,497	51.55%	18,324	48.45%	1,173	3.10%	37,821
Sierra Madre	Los Angeles	2,007	38.16%	3,253	61.84%	-1,246	-23.69%	5,260
Signal Hill	Los Angeles	987	52.75%	884	47.25%	103	5.51%	1,871
South El Monte	Los Angeles	993	72.06%	385	27.94%	608	44.12%	1,378
South Gate	Los Angeles	13,960	56.63%	10,693	43.37%	3,267	13.25%	24,653
South Pasadena	Los Angeles	3,616	33.60%	7,146	66.40%	-3,530	-32.80%	10,762
Temple City	Los Angeles	6,128	44.28%	7,711	55.72%	-1,583	-11.44%	13,839
Torrance	Los Angeles	23,179	48.62%	24,491	51.38%	-1,312	-2.75%	47,670
Vernon	Los Angeles	49	69.01%	22	30.99%	27	38.03%	71
Walnut	Los Angeles	463	47.05%	521	52.95%	-58	-5.89%	984
West Covina	Los Angeles	11,089	46.11%	12,959	53.89%	-1,870	-7.78%	24,048
Whittier	Los Angeles	12,764	40.04%	19,115	59.96%	-6,351	-19.92%	31,879
Unincorporated Area	Los Angeles	219,642	57.62%	161,535	42.38%	58,107	15.24%	381,177
Unapportioned Absentees	Los Angeles	45,799	50.04%	45,729	49.96%	70	0.08%	91,528
New Resident Vote	Los Angeles	2,391	58.69%	1,683	41.31%	708	17.38%	4,074
Chowchilla	Madera	1,066	67.98%	502	32.02%	564	35.97%	1,568
Madera	Madera	3,593	72.51%	1,362	27.49%	2,231	45.03%	4,955
Unincorporated Area	Madera	4,236	64.64%	2,317	35.36%	1,919	29.28%	6,553
Unapportioned Absentees	Madera	495	64.20%	276	35.80%	219	28.40%	771
New Resident Vote	Madera	1	20.00%	4	80.00%	-3	-60.00%	5
Belvedere	Marin	526	45.94%	619	54.06%	-93	-8.12%	1,145
Corte Madera	Marin	2,044	61.57%	1,276	38.43%	768	23.13%	3,320
Fairfax	Marin	1,977	66.99%	974	33.01%	1,003	33.99%	2,951
Larkspur	Marin	2,010	59.80%	1,351	40.20%	659	19.61%	3,361
Mill Valley	Marin	3,367	62.23%	2,044	37.77%	1,323	24.45%	5,411
Novato	Marin	4,093	64.22%	2,280	35.78%	1,813	28.45%	6,373
Ross	Marin	569	46.99%	642	53.01%	-73	-6.03%	1,211
San Anselmo	Marin	3,717	64.68%	2,030	35.32%	1,687	29.35%	5,747
San Rafael	Marin	8,044	61.75%	4,982	38.25%	3,062	23.51%	13,026
Sausalito	Marin	1,992	65.70%	1,040	34.30%	952	31.40%	3,032
Tiburon	Marin	1,105	57.82%	806	42.18%	299	15.65%	1,911
Unincorporated Area	Marin	14,095	61.42%	8,852	38.58%	5,243	22.85%	22,947
Unapportioned Absentees	Marin	2,771	62.42%	1,668	37.58%	1,103	24.85%	4,439
New Resident Vote	Marin	152	56.30%	118	43.70%	34	12.59%	270
Unincorporated Area	Mariposa	1,704	57.41%	1,264	42.59%	440	14.82%	2,968
Fort Bragg	Mendocino	1,310	75.29%	430	24.71%	880	50.57%	1,740
Point Arena	Mendocino	70	41.67%	98	58.33%	-28	-16.67%	168
Ukiah	Mendocino	2,574	65.55%	1,353	34.45%	1,221	31.09%	3,927
Willits	Mendocino	731	65.62%	383	34.38%	348	31.24%	1,114
Unincorporated Area	Mendocino	6,611	64.07%	3,708	35.93%	2,903	28.13%	10,319
Unapportioned Absentees	Mendocino	573	62.28%	347	37.72%	226	24.57%	920
New Resident Vote	Mendocino	0	0.00%	3	100.00%	-3	-100.00%	3
Atwater	Merced	1,262	68.51%	580	31.49%	682	37.02%	1,842
Dos Palos	Merced	575	64.61%	315	35.39%	260	29.21%	890
Gustine	Merced	899	82.86%	186	17.14%	713	65.71%	1,085
Livingston	Merced	374	68.75%	170	31.25%	204	37.50%	544
Los Banos	Merced	2,292	76.89%	689	23.11%	1,603	53.77%	2,981
Merced	Merced	4,214	67.22%	2,055	32.78%	2,159	34.44%	6,269
Unincorporated Area	Merced	8,812	67.16%	4,308	32.84%	4,504	34.33%	13,120
Unapportioned Absentees	Merced	987	66.33%	501	33.67%	486	32.66%	1,488
New Resident Vote	Merced	16	61.54%	10	38.46%	6	23.08%	26
Alturas	Modoc	789	73.26%	288	26.74%	501	46.52%	1,077
Unincorporated Area	Modoc	991	49.80%	999	50.20%	-8	-0.40%	1,990
Unapportioned Absentees	Modoc	192	66.44%	97	33.56%	95	32.87%	289
New Resident Vote	Modoc	0	0.00%	2	100.00%	-2	-100.00%	2
Unincorporated Area	Mono	666	43.93%	850	56.07%	-184	-12.14%	1,516
Carmel-by-the-Sea	Monterey	1,242	49.88%	1,248	50.12%	-6	-0.24%	2,490
Del Rey Oaks	Monterey	422	59.35%	289	40.65%	133	18.71%	711
Gonzales	Monterey	398	69.70%	173	30.30%	225	39.40%	571
Greenfield	Monterey	285	56.66%	218	43.34%	67	13.32%	503
King City	Monterey	617	55.04%	504	44.96%	113	10.08%	1,121
Monterey	Monterey	4,692	67.38%	2,272	32.62%	2,420	34.75%	6,964
Pacific Grove	Monterey	2,909	57.72%	2,131	42.28%	778	15.44%	5,040
Salinas	Monterey	11,208	63.90%	6,333	36.10%	4,875	27.79%	17,541
Sand City	Monterey	61	72.62%	23	27.38%	38	45.24%	84
Seaside	Monterey	3,985	76.65%	1,214	23.35%	2,771	53.30%	5,199
Soledad	Monterey	524	73.18%	192	26.82%	332	46.37%	716
Unincorporated Area	Monterey	11,082	57.36%	8,238	42.64%	2,844	14.72%	19,320
Unapportioned Absentees	Monterey	2,588	60.44%	1,694	39.56%	894	20.88%	4,282
New Resident Vote	Monterey	80	61.54%	50	38.46%	30	23.08%	130
Calistoga	Napa	557	63.01%	327	36.99%	230	26.02%	884
Napa	Napa	8,287	66.41%	4,192	33.59%	4,095	32.82%	12,479
St. Helena	Napa	799	53.95%	682	46.05%	117	7.90%	1,481
Unincorporated Area	Napa	8,841	60.73%	5,717	39.27%	3,124	21.46%	14,558
Unapportioned Absentees	Napa	1,085	62.83%	642	37.17%	443	25.65%	1,727
New Resident Vote	Napa	11	61.11%	7	38.89%	4	22.22%	18
Grass Valley	Nevada	1,343	60.52%	876	39.48%	467	21.05%	2,219
Nevada City	Nevada	679	59.67%	459	40.33%	220	19.33%	1,138
Unincorporated Area	Nevada	3,965	55.48%	3,182	44.52%	783	10.96%	7,147
Unapportioned Absentees	Nevada	406	51.65%	380	48.35%	26	3.31%	786
New Resident Vote	Nevada	4	66.67%	2	33.33%	2	33.33%	6
Anaheim	Orange	22,559	44.30%	28,367	55.70%	-5,808	-11.40%	50,926
Brea	Orange	1,920	39.89%	2,893	60.11%	-973	-20.22%	4,813
Buena Park	Orange	9,681	51.79%	9,010	48.21%	671	3.59%	18,691
Costa Mesa	Orange	9,275	42.17%	12,717	57.83%	-3,442	-15.65%	21,992
Cypress	Orange	2,076	54.88%	1,707	45.12%	369	9.75%	3,783
Dairyland	Orange	52	29.38%	125	70.62%	-73	-41.24%	177
Fountain Valley	Orange	1,393	49.31%	1,432	50.69%	-39	-1.38%	2,825
Fullerton	Orange	11,833	41.08%	16,973	58.92%	-5,140	-17.84%	28,806
Garden Grove	Orange	19,737	51.01%	18,959	48.99%	778	2.01%	38,696
Huntington Beach	Orange	10,168	49.18%	10,509	50.82%	-341	-1.65%	20,677
Laguna Beach	Orange	1,872	32.05%	3,968	67.95%	-2,096	-35.89%	5,840
La Habra	Orange	5,998	44.46%	7,494	55.54%	-1,496	-11.09%	13,492
Los Alamitos	Orange	1,231	52.38%	1,119	47.62%	112	4.77%	2,350
Newport Beach	Orange	4,623	26.57%	12,775	73.43%	-8,152	-46.86%	17,398
Orange	Orange	8,943	37.95%	14,622	62.05%	-5,679	-24.10%	23,565
Placentia	Orange	1,989	47.82%	2,170	52.18%	-181	-4.35%	4,159
San Clemente	Orange	1,868	34.65%	3,523	65.35%	-1,655	-30.70%	5,391
San Juan Capistrano	Orange	251	41.56%	353	58.44%	-102	-16.89%	604
Santa Ana	Orange	21,040	47.53%	23,225	52.47%	-2,185	-4.94%	44,265
Seal Beach	Orange	4,606	45.57%	5,502	54.43%	-896	-8.86%	10,108
Stanton	Orange	2,594	55.25%	2,101	44.75%	493	10.50%	4,695
Tustin	Orange	1,011	35.62%	1,827	64.38%	-816	-28.75%	2,838
Villa Park	Orange	131	23.86%	418	76.14%	-287	-52.28%	549
Westminster	Orange	8,557	56.71%	6,531	43.29%	2,026	13.43%	15,088
Unincorporated Area	Orange	16,529	38.63%	26,257	61.37%	-9,728	-22.74%	42,786
Unapportioned Absentees	Orange	6,040	40.42%	8,902	59.58%	-2,862	-19.15%	14,942
New Resident Vote	Orange	562	43.94%	717	56.06%	-155	-12.12%	1,279
Auburn	Placer	1,596	58.23%	1,145	41.77%	451	16.45%	2,741
Colfax	Placer	274	71.73%	108	28.27%	166	43.46%	382
Lincoln	Placer	851	75.91%	270	24.09%	581	51.83%	1,121
Rocklin	Placer	563	74.67%	191	25.33%	372	49.34%	754
Roseville	Placer	4,988	74.31%	1,724	25.69%	3,264	48.63%	6,712
Unincorporated Area	Placer	8,758	62.65%	5,221	37.35%	3,537	25.30%	13,979
Unapportioned Absentees	Placer	1,223	62.85%	723	37.15%	500	25.69%	1,946
New Resident Vote	Placer	3	30.00%	7	70.00%	-4	-40.00%	10
Portola	Plumas	580	84.67%	105	15.33%	475	69.34%	685
Unincorporated Area	Plumas	3,005	67.45%	1,450	32.55%	1,555	34.90%	4,455
Unapportioned Absentees	Plumas	434	76.81%	131	23.19%	303	53.63%	565
Banning	Riverside	2,740	57.58%	2,019	42.42%	721	15.15%	4,759
Beaumont	Riverside	1,173	56.83%	891	43.17%	282	13.66%	2,064
Blythe	Riverside	1,208	60.98%	773	39.02%	435	21.96%	1,981
Cabazon	Riverside	262	66.67%	131	33.33%	131	33.33%	393
Coachella	Riverside	869	83.72%	169	16.28%	700	67.44%	1,038
Corona	Riverside	4,033	61.29%	2,547	38.71%	1,486	22.58%	6,580
Desert Hot Springs	Riverside	665	58.75%	467	41.25%	198	17.49%	1,132
Elsinore	Riverside	1,026	73.76%	365	26.24%	661	47.52%	1,391
Hemet	Riverside	1,987	50.04%	1,984	49.96%	3	0.08%	3,971
Indio	Riverside	2,231	64.74%	1,215	35.26%	1,016	29.48%	3,446
Palm Springs	Riverside	3,605	50.08%	3,593	49.92%	12	0.17%	7,198
Perris	Riverside	486	65.41%	257	34.59%	229	30.82%	743
Riverside	Riverside	27,527	56.40%	21,282	43.60%	6,245	12.79%	48,809
San Jacinto	Riverside	667	56.19%	520	43.81%	147	12.38%	1,187
Unincorporated Area	Riverside	28,263	56.78%	21,512	43.22%	6,751	13.56%	49,775
Unapportioned Absentees	Riverside	3,652	52.27%	3,335	47.73%	317	4.54%	6,987
New Resident Vote	Riverside	134	56.07%	105	43.93%	29	12.13%	239
Folsom	Sacramento	1,343	60.39%	881	39.61%	462	20.77%	2,224
Galt	Sacramento	518	59.95%	346	40.05%	172	19.91%	864
Isleton	Sacramento	229	73.87%	81	26.13%	148	47.74%	310
North Sacramento	Sacramento	3,849	74.00%	1,352	26.00%	2,497	48.01%	5,201
Sacramento	Sacramento	65,697	69.91%	28,270	30.09%	37,427	39.83%	93,967
Unincorporated Area	Sacramento	71,534	62.32%	43,254	37.68%	28,280	24.64%	114,788
Unapportioned Absentees	Sacramento	6,360	63.95%	3,585	36.05%	2,775	27.90%	9,945
New Resident Vote	Sacramento	138	57.50%	102	42.50%	36	15.00%	240
Hollister	San Benito	1,610	64.48%	887	35.52%	723	28.95%	2,497
San Juan Bautista	San Benito	335	78.27%	93	21.73%	242	56.54%	428
Unincorporated Area	San Benito	1,644	55.60%	1,313	44.40%	331	11.19%	2,957
Unapportioned Absentees	San Benito	182	55.83%	144	44.17%	38	11.66%	326
New Resident Vote	San Benito	8	53.33%	7	46.67%	1	6.67%	15
Barstow	San Bernardino	2,968	65.19%	1,585	34.81%	1,383	30.38%	4,553
Chino	San Bernardino	2,154	56.88%	1,633	43.12%	521	13.76%	3,787
Colton	San Bernardino	4,831	75.25%	1,589	24.75%	3,242	50.50%	6,420
Fontana	San Bernardino	4,345	66.95%	2,145	33.05%	2,200	33.90%	6,490
Montclair	San Bernardino	3,164	54.47%	2,645	45.53%	519	8.93%	5,809
Needles	San Bernardino	778	62.29%	471	37.71%	307	24.58%	1,249
Ontario	San Bernardino	10,863	53.62%	9,397	46.38%	1,466	7.24%	20,260
Redlands	San Bernardino	6,086	46.50%	7,003	53.50%	-917	-7.01%	13,089
Rialto	San Bernardino	5,032	58.98%	3,500	41.02%	1,532	17.96%	8,532
San Bernardino	San Bernardino	23,930	63.95%	13,488	36.05%	10,442	27.91%	37,418
Upland	San Bernardino	4,353	44.88%	5,346	55.12%	-993	-10.24%	9,699
Victorville	San Bernardino	1,342	50.07%	1,338	49.93%	4	0.15%	2,680
Unincorporated Area	San Bernardino	47,635	56.07%	37,327	43.93%	10,308	12.13%	84,962
Unapportioned Absentees	San Bernardino	5,377	54.14%	4,554	45.86%	823	8.29%	9,931
New Resident Vote	San Bernardino	154	55.40%	124	44.60%	30	10.79%	278
Carlsbad	San Diego	2,049	47.53%	2,262	52.47%	-213	-4.94%	4,311
Chula Vista	San Diego	10,030	50.97%	9,648	49.03%	382	1.94%	19,678
Coronado	San Diego	1,725	36.86%	2,955	63.14%	-1,230	-26.28%	4,680
Del Mar	San Diego	654	40.37%	966	59.63%	-312	-19.26%	1,620
El Cajon	San Diego	9,659	51.81%	8,984	48.19%	675	3.62%	18,643
Escondido	San Diego	4,899	44.92%	6,008	55.08%	-1,109	-10.17%	10,907
Imperial Beach	San Diego	2,219	54.55%	1,849	45.45%	370	9.10%	4,068
La Mesa	San Diego	7,394	43.28%	9,690	56.72%	-2,296	-13.44%	17,084
National City	San Diego	6,097	59.99%	4,067	40.01%	2,030	19.97%	10,164
Oceanside	San Diego	4,951	53.31%	4,336	46.69%	615	6.62%	9,287
San Diego	San Diego	112,469	51.38%	106,422	48.62%	6,047	2.76%	218,891
San Marcos	San Diego	574	46.52%	660	53.48%	-86	-6.97%	1,234
Vista	San Diego	3,350	42.29%	4,571	57.71%	-1,221	-15.41%	7,921
Unincorporated Area	San Diego	33,877	46.05%	39,691	53.95%	-5,814	-7.90%	73,568
Unapportioned Absentees	San Diego	11,518	49.15%	11,917	50.85%	-399	-1.70%	23,435
New Resident Vote	San Diego	343	45.01%	419	54.99%	-76	-9.97%	762
San Francisco	San Francisco	230,758	71.28%	92,994	28.72%	137,764	42.55%	323,752
Escalon	San Joaquin	509	61.85%	314	38.15%	195	23.69%	823
Lodi	San Joaquin	5,176	48.42%	5,513	51.58%	-337	-3.15%	10,689
Manteca	San Joaquin	2,499	68.24%	1,163	31.76%	1,336	36.48%	3,662
Ripon	San Joaquin	420	45.36%	506	54.64%	-86	-9.29%	926
Stockton	San Joaquin	21,485	66.11%	11,014	33.89%	10,471	32.22%	32,499
Tracy	San Joaquin	3,107	66.29%	1,580	33.71%	1,527	32.58%	4,687
Unincorporated Area	San Joaquin	23,428	61.48%	14,677	38.52%	8,751	22.97%	38,105
Unapportioned Absentees	San Joaquin	2,541	59.42%	1,735	40.58%	806	18.85%	4,276
New Resident Vote	San Joaquin	45	50.56%	44	49.44%	1	1.12%	89
Arroyo Grande	San Luis Obispo	1,520	56.17%	1,186	43.83%	334	12.34%	2,706
Grover City	San Luis Obispo	1,343	68.66%	613	31.34%	730	37.32%	1,956
Morro Bay	San Luis Obispo	1,710	60.32%	1,125	39.68%	585	20.63%	2,835
El Paso de Robles	San Luis Obispo	1,434	55.18%	1,165	44.82%	269	10.35%	2,599
Pismo Beach	San Luis Obispo	488	58.16%	351	41.84%	137	16.33%	839
San Luis Obispo	San Luis Obispo	6,106	62.24%	3,705	37.76%	2,401	24.47%	9,811
Unincorporated Area	San Luis Obispo	7,979	58.21%	5,729	41.79%	2,250	16.41%	13,708
Unapportioned Absentees	San Luis Obispo	1,648	61.91%	1,014	38.09%	634	23.82%	2,662
New Resident Vote	San Luis Obispo	24	57.14%	18	42.86%	6	14.29%	42
Atherton	San Mateo	1,587	42.04%	2,188	57.96%	-601	-15.92%	3,775
Belmont	San Mateo	5,260	63.06%	3,081	36.94%	2,179	26.12%	8,341
Brisbane	San Mateo	803	72.28%	308	27.72%	495	44.55%	1,111
Burlingame	San Mateo	6,941	55.44%	5,578	44.56%	1,363	10.89%	12,519
Colma	San Mateo	110	63.58%	63	36.42%	47	27.17%	173
Daly City	San Mateo	15,505	70.66%	6,438	29.34%	9,067	41.32%	21,943
Half Moon Bay	San Mateo	775	73.81%	275	26.19%	500	47.62%	1,050
Hillsborough	San Mateo	1,507	37.66%	2,495	62.34%	-988	-24.69%	4,002
Menlo Park	San Mateo	7,575	61.59%	4,724	38.41%	2,851	23.18%	12,299
Millbrae	San Mateo	5,300	61.46%	3,324	38.54%	1,976	22.91%	8,624
Pacifica	San Mateo	6,744	70.74%	2,790	29.26%	3,954	41.47%	9,534
Portola Valley	San Mateo	873	53.46%	760	46.54%	113	6.92%	1,633
Redwood City	San Mateo	14,587	66.61%	7,311	33.39%	7,276	33.23%	21,898
San Bruno	San Mateo	9,423	68.53%	4,327	31.47%	5,096	37.06%	13,750
San Carlos	San Mateo	6,828	57.72%	5,002	42.28%	1,826	15.44%	11,830
San Mateo	San Mateo	20,807	63.77%	11,822	36.23%	8,985	27.54%	32,629
South San Francisco	San Mateo	11,144	73.43%	4,032	26.57%	7,112	46.86%	15,176
Woodside	San Mateo	948	46.00%	1,113	54.00%	-165	-8.01%	2,061
Unincorporated Area	San Mateo	17,915	68.98%	8,057	31.02%	9,858	37.96%	25,972
Unapportioned Absentees	San Mateo	6,068	60.23%	4,006	39.77%	2,062	20.47%	10,074
New Resident Vote	San Mateo	278	55.60%	222	44.40%	56	11.20%	500
Guadalupe	Santa Barbara	520	72.73%	195	27.27%	325	45.45%	715
Lompoc	Santa Barbara	3,549	54.17%	3,002	45.83%	547	8.35%	6,551
Santa Barbara	Santa Barbara	17,266	60.40%	11,321	39.60%	5,945	20.80%	28,587
Santa Maria	Santa Barbara	5,796	52.88%	5,165	47.12%	631	5.76%	10,961
Unincorporated Area	Santa Barbara	18,403	54.15%	15,585	45.85%	2,818	8.29%	33,988
Unapportioned Absentees	Santa Barbara	2,634	50.25%	2,608	49.75%	26	0.50%	5,242
New Resident Vote	Santa Barbara	213	59.66%	144	40.34%	69	19.33%	357
Alviso	Santa Clara	258	88.36%	34	11.64%	224	76.71%	292
Campbell	Santa Clara	4,428	63.29%	2,568	36.71%	1,860	26.59%	6,996
Cupertino	Santa Clara	2,110	55.79%	1,672	44.21%	438	11.58%	3,782
Gilroy	Santa Clara	2,227	68.40%	1,029	31.60%	1,198	36.79%	3,256
Los Altos	Santa Clara	5,526	51.18%	5,271	48.82%	255	2.36%	10,797
Los Altos Hills	Santa Clara	1,152	50.53%	1,128	49.47%	24	1.05%	2,280
Los Gatos	Santa Clara	3,609	54.21%	3,048	45.79%	561	8.43%	6,657
Milpitas	Santa Clara	3,064	71.92%	1,196	28.08%	1,868	43.85%	4,260
Monte Sereno	Santa Clara	500	50.86%	483	49.14%	17	1.73%	983
Morgan Hill	Santa Clara	804	61.47%	504	38.53%	300	22.94%	1,308
Mountain View	Santa Clara	9,923	64.96%	5,353	35.04%	4,570	29.92%	15,276
Palo Alto	Santa Clara	15,542	63.61%	8,891	36.39%	6,651	27.22%	24,433
San Jose	Santa Clara	73,296	65.34%	38,888	34.66%	34,408	30.67%	112,184
Santa Clara	Santa Clara	18,498	67.90%	8,746	32.10%	9,752	35.80%	27,244
Saratoga	Santa Clara	4,062	47.73%	4,449	52.27%	-387	-4.55%	8,511
Sunnyvale	Santa Clara	16,423	61.72%	10,188	38.28%	6,235	23.43%	26,611
Unincorporated Area	Santa Clara	32,646	63.74%	18,572	36.26%	14,074	27.48%	51,218
Unapportioned Absentees	Santa Clara	7,575	60.40%	4,966	39.60%	2,609	20.80%	12,541
New Resident Vote	Santa Clara	606	58.27%	434	41.73%	172	16.54%	1,040
Capitola	Santa Cruz	962	58.55%	681	41.45%	281	17.10%	1,643
Santa Cruz	Santa Cruz	7,356	57.93%	5,341	42.07%	2,015	15.87%	12,697
Watsonville	Santa Cruz	3,414	69.69%	1,485	30.31%	1,929	39.38%	4,899
Unincorporated Area	Santa Cruz	13,677	57.24%	10,219	42.76%	3,458	14.47%	23,896
Unapportioned Absentees	Santa Cruz	1,290	54.29%	1,086	45.71%	204	8.59%	2,376
New Resident Vote	Santa Cruz	15	38.46%	24	61.54%	-9	-23.08%	39
Anderson	Shasta	1,464	71.94%	571	28.06%	893	43.88%	2,035
Redding	Shasta	3,846	65.04%	2,067	34.96%	1,779	30.09%	5,913
Unincorporated Area	Shasta	12,859	68.33%	5,960	31.67%	6,899	36.66%	18,819
Unapportioned Absentees	Shasta	926	63.04%	543	36.96%	383	26.07%	1,469
New Resident Vote	Shasta	47	55.95%	37	44.05%	10	11.90%	84
Loyalton	Sierra	339	86.48%	53	13.52%	286	72.96%	392
Unincorporated Area	Sierra	432	58.54%	306	41.46%	126	17.07%	738
Unapportioned Absentees	Sierra	57	51.35%	54	48.65%	3	2.70%	111
Dorris	Siskiyou	254	61.95%	156	38.05%	98	23.90%	410
Dunsmuir	Siskiyou	798	76.29%	248	23.71%	550	52.58%	1,046
Etna	Siskiyou	152	53.52%	132	46.48%	20	7.04%	284
Fort Jones	Siskiyou	118	52.44%	107	47.56%	11	4.89%	225
Montague	Siskiyou	189	61.56%	118	38.44%	71	23.13%	307
Mt. Shasta	Siskiyou	717	69.61%	313	30.39%	404	39.22%	1,030
Tulelake	Siskiyou	113	36.10%	200	63.90%	-87	-27.80%	313
Weed	Siskiyou	1,028	81.98%	226	18.02%	802	63.96%	1,254
Yreka	Siskiyou	1,236	58.80%	866	41.20%	370	17.60%	2,102
Unincorporated Area	Siskiyou	3,723	59.69%	2,514	40.31%	1,209	19.38%	6,237
Unapportioned Absentees	Siskiyou	796	72.50%	302	27.50%	494	44.99%	1,098
New Resident Vote	Siskiyou	2	33.33%	4	66.67%	-2	-33.33%	6
Benicia	Solano	1,856	71.99%	722	28.01%	1,134	43.99%	2,578
Dixon	Solano	765	60.09%	508	39.91%	257	20.19%	1,273
Fairfield	Solano	3,974	68.73%	1,808	31.27%	2,166	37.46%	5,782
Rio Vista	Solano	649	57.89%	472	42.11%	177	15.79%	1,121
Suisun City	Solano	346	75.38%	113	24.62%	233	50.76%	459
Vacaville	Solano	2,686	65.98%	1,385	34.02%	1,301	31.96%	4,071
Vallejo	Solano	18,675	72.61%	7,045	27.39%	11,630	45.22%	25,720
Unincorporated Area	Solano	4,078	64.12%	2,282	35.88%	1,796	28.24%	6,360
Unapportioned Absentees	Solano	1,892	67.21%	923	32.79%	969	34.42%	2,815
New Resident Vote	Solano	9	64.29%	5	35.71%	4	28.57%	14
Cloverdale	Sonoma	768	69.50%	337	30.50%	431	39.00%	1,105
Cotati	Sonoma	352	71.69%	139	28.31%	213	43.38%	491
Healdsburg	Sonoma	1,314	61.23%	832	38.77%	482	22.46%	2,146
Petaluma	Sonoma	4,578	66.72%	2,283	33.28%	2,295	33.45%	6,861
Rohnert Park	Sonoma	726	66.42%	367	33.58%	359	32.85%	1,093
Santa Rosa	Sonoma	10,133	59.60%	6,870	40.40%	3,263	19.19%	17,003
Sebastopol	Sonoma	883	58.44%	628	41.56%	255	16.88%	1,511
Sonoma	Sonoma	1,057	59.52%	719	40.48%	338	19.03%	1,776
Unincorporated Area	Sonoma	22,368	61.56%	13,969	38.44%	8,399	23.11%	36,337
Unapportioned Absentees	Sonoma	2,132	59.17%	1,471	40.83%	661	18.35%	3,603
New Resident Vote	Sonoma	43	40.95%	62	59.05%	-19	-18.10%	105
Ceres	Stanislaus	1,151	72.48%	437	27.52%	714	44.96%	1,588
Modesto	Stanislaus	11,825	64.28%	6,570	35.72%	5,255	28.57%	18,395
Newman	Stanislaus	729	78.47%	200	21.53%	529	56.94%	929
Oakdale	Stanislaus	1,564	64.76%	851	35.24%	713	29.52%	2,415
Patterson	Stanislaus	551	64.07%	309	35.93%	242	28.14%	860
Riverbank	Stanislaus	862	82.41%	184	17.59%	678	64.82%	1,046
Turlock	Stanislaus	2,434	56.75%	1,855	43.25%	579	13.50%	4,289
Unincorporated Area	Stanislaus	21,983	67.99%	10,348	32.01%	11,635	35.99%	32,331
Unapportioned Absentees	Stanislaus	1,929	61.93%	1,186	38.07%	743	23.85%	3,115
New Resident Vote	Stanislaus	50	60.24%	33	39.76%	17	20.48%	83
Live Oak	Sutter	450	56.60%	345	43.40%	105	13.21%	795
Yuba City	Sutter	2,329	49.81%	2,347	50.19%	-18	-0.38%	4,676
Unincorporated Area	Sutter	3,663	46.76%	4,171	53.24%	-508	-6.48%	7,834
Unapportioned Absentees	Sutter	339	47.48%	375	52.52%	-36	-5.04%	714
New Resident Vote	Sutter	6	66.67%	3	33.33%	3	33.33%	9
Corning	Tehama	731	57.38%	543	42.62%	188	14.76%	1,274
Red Bluff	Tehama	2,020	65.29%	1,074	34.71%	946	30.58%	3,094
Tehama	Tehama	74	57.81%	54	42.19%	20	15.63%	128
Unincorporated Area	Tehama	3,724	58.54%	2,637	41.46%	1,087	17.09%	6,361
Unapportioned Absentees	Tehama	371	62.88%	219	37.12%	152	25.76%	590
New Resident Vote	Tehama	8	80.00%	2	20.00%	6	60.00%	10
Unincorporated Area	Trinity	2,175	63.47%	1,252	36.53%	923	26.93%	3,427
Dinuba	Tulare	1,427	60.29%	940	39.71%	487	20.57%	2,367
Exeter	Tulare	910	56.56%	699	43.44%	211	13.11%	1,609
Farmersville	Tulare	549	72.52%	208	27.48%	341	45.05%	757
Lindsay	Tulare	989	54.85%	814	45.15%	175	9.71%	1,803
Porterville	Tulare	1,924	56.13%	1,504	43.87%	420	12.25%	3,428
Tulare	Tulare	3,652	73.25%	1,334	26.75%	2,318	46.49%	4,986
Visalia	Tulare	3,729	50.28%	3,687	49.72%	42	0.57%	7,416
Woodlake	Tulare	457	63.38%	264	36.62%	193	26.77%	721
Unincorporated Area	Tulare	19,088	61.13%	12,137	38.87%	6,951	22.26%	31,225
Unapportioned Absentees	Tulare	1,233	57.19%	923	42.81%	310	14.38%	2,156
New Resident Vote	Tulare	16	48.48%	17	51.52%	-1	-3.03%	33
Sonora	Tuolumne	867	63.19%	505	36.81%	362	26.38%	1,372
Unincorporated Area	Tuolumne	3,665	63.17%	2,137	36.83%	1,528	26.34%	5,802
Unapportioned Absentees	Tuolumne	403	64.79%	219	35.21%	184	29.58%	622
New Resident Vote	Tuolumne	4	100.00%	0	0.00%	4	100.00%	4
Camarillo	Ventura	1,960	55.03%	1,602	44.97%	358	10.05%	3,562
Fillmore	Ventura	1,120	63.24%	651	36.76%	469	26.48%	1,771
Ojai	Ventura	1,306	57.26%	975	42.74%	331	14.51%	2,281
Oxnard	Ventura	10,412	65.39%	5,510	34.61%	4,902	30.79%	15,922
Port Hueneme	Ventura	2,012	63.41%	1,161	36.59%	851	26.82%	3,173
Santa Paula	Ventura	3,226	63.11%	1,886	36.89%	1,340	26.21%	5,112
Thousand Oaks	Ventura	3,094	45.02%	3,779	54.98%	-685	-9.97%	6,873
Ventura	Ventura	10,191	61.88%	6,279	38.12%	3,912	23.75%	16,470
Unincorporated Area	Ventura	21,764	57.53%	16,069	42.47%	5,695	15.05%	37,833
Unapportioned Absentees	Ventura	2,477	53.31%	2,169	46.69%	308	6.63%	4,646
New Resident Vote	Ventura	243	57.04%	183	42.96%	60	14.08%	426
Davis	Yolo	3,493	69.31%	1,547	30.69%	1,946	38.61%	5,040
Winters	Yolo	470	69.22%	209	30.78%	261	38.44%	679
Woodland	Yolo	4,127	67.64%	1,974	32.36%	2,153	35.29%	6,101
Unincorporated Area	Yolo	9,258	71.01%	3,780	28.99%	5,478	42.02%	13,038
Unapportioned Absentees	Yolo	864	65.95%	446	34.05%	418	31.91%	1,310
New Resident Vote	Yolo	54	72.97%	20	27.03%	34	45.95%	74
Marysville	Yuba	1,903	50.25%	1,884	49.75%	19	0.50%	3,787
Wheatland	Yuba	262	62.53%	157	37.47%	105	25.06%	419
Unincorporated Area	Yuba	4,171	61.18%	2,647	38.82%	1,524	22.35%	6,818
Unapportioned Absentees	Yuba	419	60.99%	268	39.01%	151	21.98%	687
New Resident Vote	Yuba	11	57.89%	8	42.11%	3	15.79%	19
Totals (Note: Statewide candidate vote percentages and the total vote number differ here because California's Supplement to Statement of Vote does not count write in votes as part of the city totals.)		4,171,877	59.17%	2,879,108	40.83%	1,292,769	18.33%	7,050,985
