= Hensley (surname) =

Hensley is an English surname. Notable people with the surname include:

- Andre Hensley, leader of the Universal Life Church
- Casey Hensley, American musician and record producer
- Cindy Hensley McCain, American businesswoman, philanthropist, and humanitarian, and the widow of John McCain
- Clay Hensley, American former professional baseball pitcher
- David Hensley, American baseball player
- Dick Hensley, American former professional football player
- George Went Hensley, American Pentecostal minister
- Gerald Hensley, New Zealand diplomat and public servant
- Jack Hensley, American hostage murdered by insurgents in Iraq in 2004
- Jaymi Hensley, English singer (Union J)
- Jim Hensley, American businessman
- Jimmy Hensley, American race driver
- John Hensley, American actor
- Jon Hensley, American actor, singer and songwriter
- Joe L. Hensley, American lawyer and author
- Joseph Hensley, Canadian politician
- Kelley Menighan Hensley, American actress
- Ken Hensley, English musician and producer
- Kirby J. Hensley, American founder of the Universal Life Church
- Lisa Hensley (microbiologist), American microbiologist
- Lisa Hensley (actress), Australian actress
- Pamela Hensley, American actress and author
- Shuler Hensley, American singer and actor
- Violet Hensley, American luthier and musician
- Patsy Cline (born Virginia Patterson Hensley; 1932–1963), American singer
