= Heissler =

Heissler is a surname. Notable people with the surname include:

- Carl Heissler (1823–1878), Austrian violinist and violist
- Drew Heissler, better known as Pokey LaFarge, American bluegrass singer
- Donat John Count Heissler of Heitersheim (1648–1696), Impérial and Royal Marshal ( KK) of the Austria-Hungary empire
- Déborah Heissler (born 1976), French author

== See also ==
- Heisler
