= Lewis Ashmore =

Lewis Ashmore

Lewis Leland Ashmore (October 18, 1931 – March 24, 2008) was a 20th-century American religious leader and a member of the board of directors and the founding vice president of the Universal Life Church founded by Kirby J. Hensley.

When Ashmore helped his friend Kirby J. Hensley to found the Universal Life Church in Modesto, California (1959-1962), they were both freelance southern ministers who had migrated to California. A Mississippi native, he ran a church in Tehachapi, California. While a member of the church he wrote the book The Modesto Messiah: The Famous Mail-Order Minister. According to his obituary in the Bakersfield Californian, Mr Ashmore left behind an unfinished movie project of the same title.

Ashmore was a noted exorcist having performed hundreds of exorcisms since the 1950s. "For decades Rev. Lewis Ashmore cast out devils during tent revivals in the Central Valley. People foamed at the mouth, talked back to him in a strange voice and writhed uncontrollably on the ground." Aged 75, two years before he died, Ashmore concluded that demonic possession could be explained in the 21st century by modern medicine. "Back in Christ’s day, these mental conditions weren’t yet diagnosed,” he said. “All exorcisms can be explained by psychology and science."

== Published works ==
- Ashmore, Lewis (1977). The Modesto messiah: The famous mail-order minister. Universal Press. ISBN 0-918950-01-5.
