= Déborah Heissler =

French poet (born 1976)

Deborah Heissler
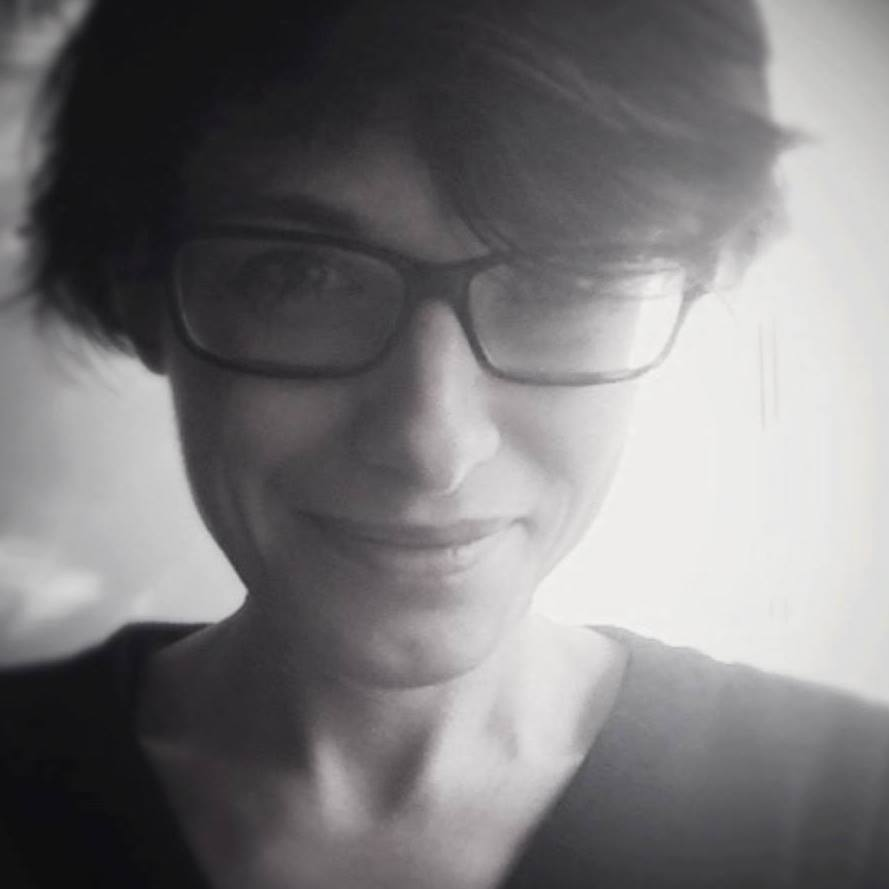
- Deborah Heissler
- Born: 5 May 1976; Mulhouse, France
- Occupation: Writer
- Writing career
- Language: French
- Years active: Since 2000
- Period: 20th – 21st century
- Genre: Poetry
- Notable works: Sorrowful Songs (2015) Chiaroscuro (2013); Comme un morceau de nuit, découpé dans son étoffe (2010) Près d'eux, la nuit sous la neige (2005)
- Notable awards: Louis Guillaume Prose Poetry Award (2012), France Yvan Goll Francophone Poetry Award (2011), France Bleustein-Blanchet Foundation Prize (2005), France

Deborah Heissler (born 5 May 1976 in Mulhouse, France) is a contemporary French author. Her works of poetry have garnered critical acclaim and numerous awards, including the Louis Guillaume Prose Poetry Award (2012), the Yvan Goll Francophone Poetry Award (2011) and the Bleustein-Blanchet Foundation Prize (2005).

== Background ==
From 1980 to 1998, training on the piano. In 1988 she won a writing scholarship Antoinette and Pol Neveux of the French Academy.

From 1994 to 2008, she devoted herself to the study of Contemporary Literature and was graduated of the University of Haute Alsace in Culture and Information Science (2008) in Mulhouse (France). She held a PhD in French Literature (2005), joined the Center for European Literary Studies at the University of Haute Alsace (2001–2008) and published at the same time her first collection of poems awarded by the Bleustein-Blanchet Foundation Prize for the Vocation (Près d'eux, la nuit sous la neige, Cheyne, 2005).

Then she became visiting Student at the Library-Museum of the Paris Opera in 2007, conducted research work on Roger Pic's Paris Opera Ballet photographs dedicated to dance in the 1960s and there discovered Jiří Kylián, Pina Bausch, Angelin Preljocaj, William Christie and Nicolas Le Riche.

She then left the National Library of France for India, China, Thailand and finally Vietnam where she taught French as a Foreign Language in several Universities and French Language Departments. Her stay at the University of Xiangtan in Hunan (China) provided her many photographs and poems. Like a swatch of night cut out of its own cloth, Cheyne publisher, 2010 –partly written in Hunan, China– was recognized by the Yvan Goll International Prize for French Poetry in 2011 as well as the Louis Guillaume Prose Poetry Award in 2012.

Since the publication of her second collection in spring 2011, she has obtained a writing scholarship from the CRLFC (Franche-Comté, France) and published Chiaroscuro, Æncrages & Co publisher, (2013). The CNL (Paris, France) awarded her a writing scholarship for the "Maison de la poésie de Rennes" in spring 2013.

She became member of the Louis Guillaume Prose Poetry Award in January 2015 and member of the Revue Nunc Poetry Award in January 2017.

== Works of poetry ==
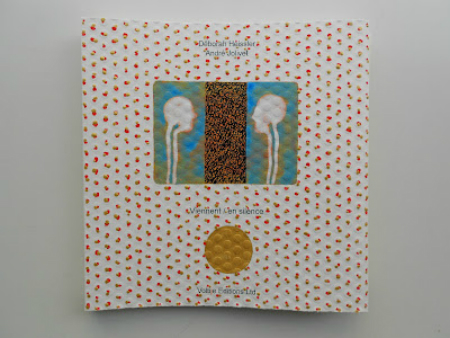
Viennent / en silence, [artists book] with artwork by André Jolivet, 9 copies 27 x 27 cm, Voltije Éditions, 2012.

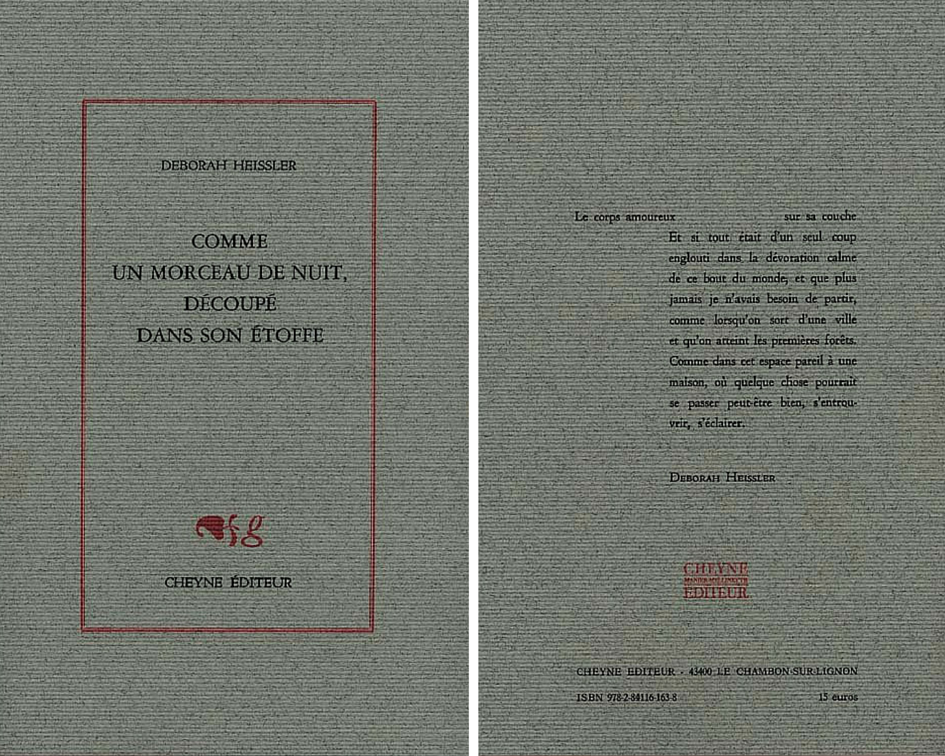
Comme un morceau de nuit, découpé dans son étoffe (Like a swatch of night cut out of its own cloth), preface by Dominique Sorrente, Cheyne publisher, coll. Grise, Chambon-sur-Lignon, France, 2010. Silence. First it's a cloud of apricot trees in flower, yellow or ivory, like a thousand little butterflies sown in the fresh grass, moving in the glow of lamplight when night ascends. Fragments of dreams. You can see the red sun setting on the foliage, like an enormous mass of incandescent steel. Then there were the trees a little farther off, straightening their fragile frames, the woolen blue pincushion flower like an eye and that tumult of milk in the deep stone, and finally the moan of the air beaten by a flock of blue woodpigeons – a silken challenge perhaps, or one of crackled leather. "Kaimamiru/Glimpse" in Like a swatch of night cut out of its own cloth, translated into English by Jacob Bromberg (2013)

Poems (previously unpublished) read in French by Deborah Heissler.

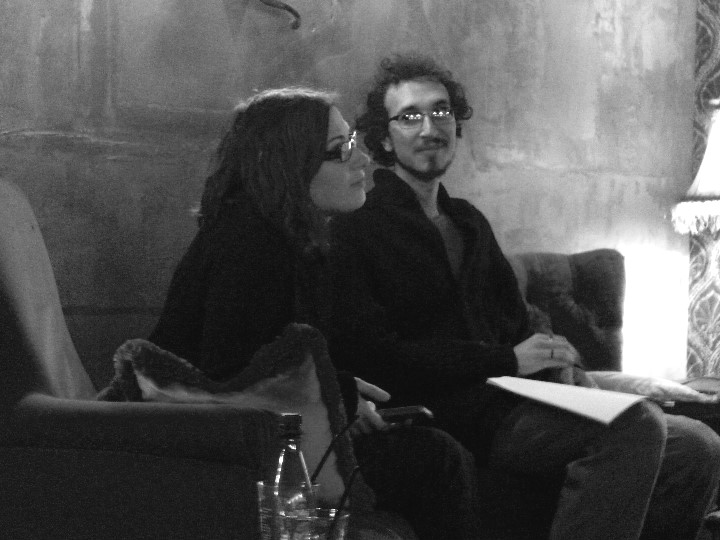
Déborah Heissler and Jacob Bromberg at Café Delaville (Ivy Writers Reading Series, Paris, 2013).

=== Collections ===
- Les Nuits et les Jours [with artwork by Joanna Kaiser (Poland)], preface by Cole Swensen (USA), Æncrages & Co, coll. Ecri(peind)re, Baume-les-Dames (France), 2020
- Collisions douces [with artwork by Philippe Agostini, Armand Dupuy and Roland Chopard], Æncrages & Co publisher, France, 2017
- Tristesse et beauté. Hommage à Yasunari Kawabata [with artwork by Philippe Agostini], France, 2017
- Morte Saison. Hommage à Nicolas Bouvier [with artwork by Philippe Agostini], France, 2017
- Sorrowful Songs [with artwork by Peter Maslow (USA)], preface by Claude Chambard (France), Æncrages & Co publisher, coll. Voix de chants, Baume-les-Dames, France, 2015.
- Kanten [with artwork by Michel Remaud], printed in 7 copies, 5 planches sous coffret, France, 2015.
- A la lisière des champs, [with artwork by Michel Remaud], L3V, printed in 7 copies, 1 of them can be seen at Marie Thamin mt-galerie, France, 2015.
- Little big book Artist, Le monde d'Eros, [with artwork by André Jolivet], Voltije Ltd, France, 2015.
- Chiaroscuro [with artwork by André Jolivet (France)], Æncrages & Co publisher, coll. Voix de chants, Baume-les-Dames, France, 2013.
- Viennent / en silence [with artwork by André Jolivet], Voltije Ltd, France, 2012.
- Comme un morceau de nuit, découpé dans son étoffe (Like a swatch of night cut out of its own cloth), preface by Dominique Sorrente, Cheyne publisher, coll. Grise, Chambon-sur-Lignon, France, 2010.
- Près d'eux, la nuit sous la neige, Cheyne publisher, coll. Vocation, Chambon-sur-Lignon, France, 2005.

=== Uncollected Poems ===
- L'Orientale, [poem] in Les Cahiers slaves, Paris IV – Sorbonne, France, 2009.
- Sur l'arbre de Judée, [prose] in Les Cahiers slaves, Paris IV – Sorbonne, France, 2005.
- Scherzando, [prose] in Les Cahiers slaves, Paris IV – Sorbonne, France, 2008.
- Offrant-e, [poem] in Paroles d'argile, SCDE, Paris IV – Sorbonne, France, 2004.

=== Anthologies ===
- Deux figures dansantes graduellement (2005), in Gare maritime, anthologie écrite et sonore de poésie contemporaine, Nantes, France, 2014.
- Loin (2010), in Terres de femmes 102 femmes poètes contemporaines, ed. Angèle Paoli, 2013.
- Tu (previously unpublished), in L'Anthologie poétique francophone de voix féminines contemporaines, Voix d'encre, Montélimar, France, 2012.
- — cette rumeur (2005), in L'Année poétique 2007 [preface by Bruno Doucey], Seghers, Paris, France, 2007.

=== Journals ===
Other works have appeared in literary journals such as the "Revue D'Ici là" (France), in Bacchanales (France), Diptyque (France), Nunc (France), the Nouvelle revue d'esthétique (PUF) (France), Raise. Magazine photographique (France), or elsewhere in Paris Lit up (United States) and SET (United States) with translations into English by Jacob Bromberg, in Buenos Aires Poetry (Argentina) with translations into Spanish by Mariano Rolando Andrade.

== Non Fiction ==
=== Criticism I, Peer-reviewed Journals ===
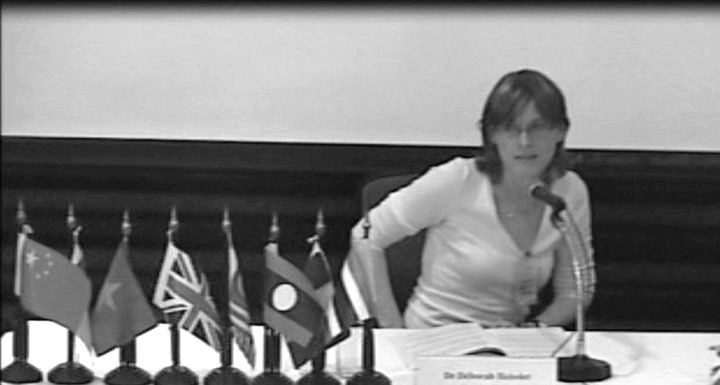
Déborah Heissler, Naresuan University of Phitsanulok, Thailand (Summer 2010).

- Et non-pas rien que sa trace de cendre : absence et effet(s) de présence dans A la lumière d'hiver de Philippe Jaccottet, Signes de feu, 2009, dir. Eric Lysøe, Paris, L'Harmattan, coll. Orizons Universités – Domaine littéraire, p. 195–204.
- L'usage du blanc et de cela que rien ne mesure. Muzik, Muzik […] il parlait de Mozart (Robert Antelme, L'Espèce humaine), Éducation – Littérature – Culture, 2008, dir. Anne Bandry, Paris, L'Harmattan, coll. Orizons Universités – Domaine littéraire, p. 155–163.
- L'exercice des labyrinthes comme l'expérience de l'abîme : Paris de Julien Green, in Creliana, no 6, Babel-Labyrinthe : destins (post)-modernes de deux mythes, 2007, Mulhouse, p. 181–192.
- Écrire en peintre : le cantabile de la neige chez Philippe Jacottet, in Ombre et Lumière dans la poésie belge et suisse de langue française, 2007, dir. P. Schnyder et E. Lysøe, Strasbourg, Presses universitaires de Strasbourg, coll. Europes littéraires, p. 323–332.
- D'un lieu, l'autre – entre identité et invention de soi : 13 poèmes inspirés du haïku de Sylviane Dupuis, in Visions de la Suisse : projets et rejets, 2005, dir. P. Schnyder, Presses universitaires de Strasbourg, coll. Helvetica, p. 327–338.
- Requiem blanc et or – les couleurs du crépuscule, in Les Chemins de Gustave Roud, 2004, dir. P. Schnyder, Strasbourg, Presses universitaires de Strasbourg, coll. Europes littéraires, p. 105–130.
- Miroir et matière de seuil, in Creliana, no 3, Portes et fenêtres, 2004, Mulhouse, p. 91–103.
- Les Poésies d'André Walter ou l'Itinéraire symbolique, vie et mort d'un poète, in André Gide et la tentation de la modernité, 2002, P. Schnyder et R. Kopp dir., Paris, Gallimard, Les Cahiers de la NRF, p. 242–269.

=== Criticism II, Literary Journals ===
- Les Notes, Laura Fiori, Fragments d'un imaginaire amoureux, Notes, Laura Fiori by Martin Ziegler, éd. L. Mauguin, 2011 (2011).
- Julien Gracq, vol. 6, Les Tensions de l’écriture. Adieu au romanesque et persistance de la fiction, Lettres Modernes Minard, Caen, 2008 (2011).
- Souvenir du soleil by Margarita Xanthakou, éd. L. Mauguin, 2009 (2010).
- Ô ter abcède by Martin Ziegler, éd. L. Mauguin, 1997 (2007).

=== Criticism III Fine Arts, Musée Critique de la Sorbonne ===
- La main du peintre on an artwork by Zao Wou-Ki – Hommage à Michaux, trois panneaux (1999–2000) (2009).
- L’homme qui tombe on an artwork by Pieter Brueghel l'Ancien – The fall of Icarus, oil on canvas, Brussels, Royal Museums of Fine Arts of Belgium (2008).
- À la lumière d’hiver on an artwork by Vincent van Gogh – Pont-levis à Nieuw-Amsterdam, aquarelle, 1883, Museum voor Stad en Lande (2008).
- Fugit tempus on an artwork by Pierre Paul Sevin – Manufacture de papier en Auvergne, 1693, inks, Paris, Bibliothèque de l’Institut (2008).

== Literary events ==
Late
for the present, I suppose

accentuated each time
you see, quick enough
this fraction of earth
underfoot

that upright speech
imprints,
like the whole of being
resumes

We've hit on something
like lightning
strikes

Deborah Heissler, "A few simple figures" in Près d'eux la nuit sous la neige, 2005, Cheyne publisher. Translated into English by Jacob Bromberg (2013).

=== Readings ===
She has been invited since 2005 to several readings and meetings at Unesco for the Day of Poetry, then at the Alliance Française of Paris—an international organization that aims to promote French language and culture around the world—and later at the Lectures sous l'arbre, a Festival organized by her publisher in France. She was also invited to read at Poés'Arts—the Festival organized by her publisher Æncrages & Co in Baume les Dames—featuring Philippe Claudel, Michel Butor, Françoise Ascal or Sabine Huynh and Armand Dupuy among others.

=== Book Fairs ===
She was invited to a Book Fair in Salins-les-Bains (France), to a Book Fair in Paris featuring Luis Mizon and Fabrice Caravaca. She was invited to the Printemps des poètes in Paris, Bordeaux, Baume-les-Dames to read or sign with Claude Chambard, André Velter, Jean-Baptiste Para, Roland Choppard and Armand Dupuy among others. She also read for Ivy Writers Parisa bilingual reading series co-organized at Delaville Café and Berkeley Books of Paris by two American translators and poets Michelle Noteboom and Jennifer K Dick. Her poems were also read at the 11th edition of the Festival Présences à Frontenay in 2015 featuring three Chinese poets, Shucai Chen, Chun Sue and Chu Chen.

=== Symposiums and musical events ===
She was invited to read in many other literary events in France and more particularly at the Maison de la poésie in Rennes accompanied by her translator Jacob Bromberg, at the Maison de la poésie in Nantes and at the Maison de la poésie in Paris during a symposium dedicated to Louis Guillaume and the prose poem alongside poets Yekta and Jeanine Baude. She also participated at literary events elsewhere in France accompanied by the young violinist Elsa Grether playing Bach and Eugène Ysaÿe or by the violinist Agathe Llorca in a Klezmer repertoire of traditional music of Eastern Europe.
