= Joanna Kaiser =

Polish painter

- Born: 1967 (age 58–59); Kraków, Poland
- Occupations: Teacher, painter
- Writing career
- Language: Polish
- Years active: 2000–present
- Period: 20th–21st century
- Genres: Drawings, paintings
- Literary movement: Néo-expressionism

Joanna Kaiser (born 1967) is a Polish artist. Between 1986 and 1991 she studied at the Academy of Fine Arts in Kraków. After graduation in drawing, she started to work as an assistant at the department of Graphic Arts. Now as a faculty professor she teaches drawing. Joanna Kaiser is a draughtsman, painter and printmaker currently living and working in Kraków, Poland.

== Background ==
- In 2000 and 2001 she attended the University of Connecticut, US, on a Fulbright Scholarship.
- Since the early 1990s she has been a member of a neo-expressionist art group Trzy Oczy.
- She had 14 solo shows in Poland and abroad:, and took part in over 70 group exhibitions all over the world.

Her latest book was produced in collaboration with Déborah Heissler and published by Æncrages & Co editions in Francee

Les Nuits et les Jours [in collaboration with Joanna Kaiser (Poland)], preface by Cole Swensen (United States), Æncrages & Co, coll. Ecri(peind)re, Baume-les-Dames, France, 2020.

== Works in collections ==
- Historical Museum, Kraków
- Museum of Modern Art, Radom, Poland
- Benton Museum, UCONN, Storrs, US
- Kate Kollwitz Museum, Berlin
