= Dominique Sorrente =

French poet

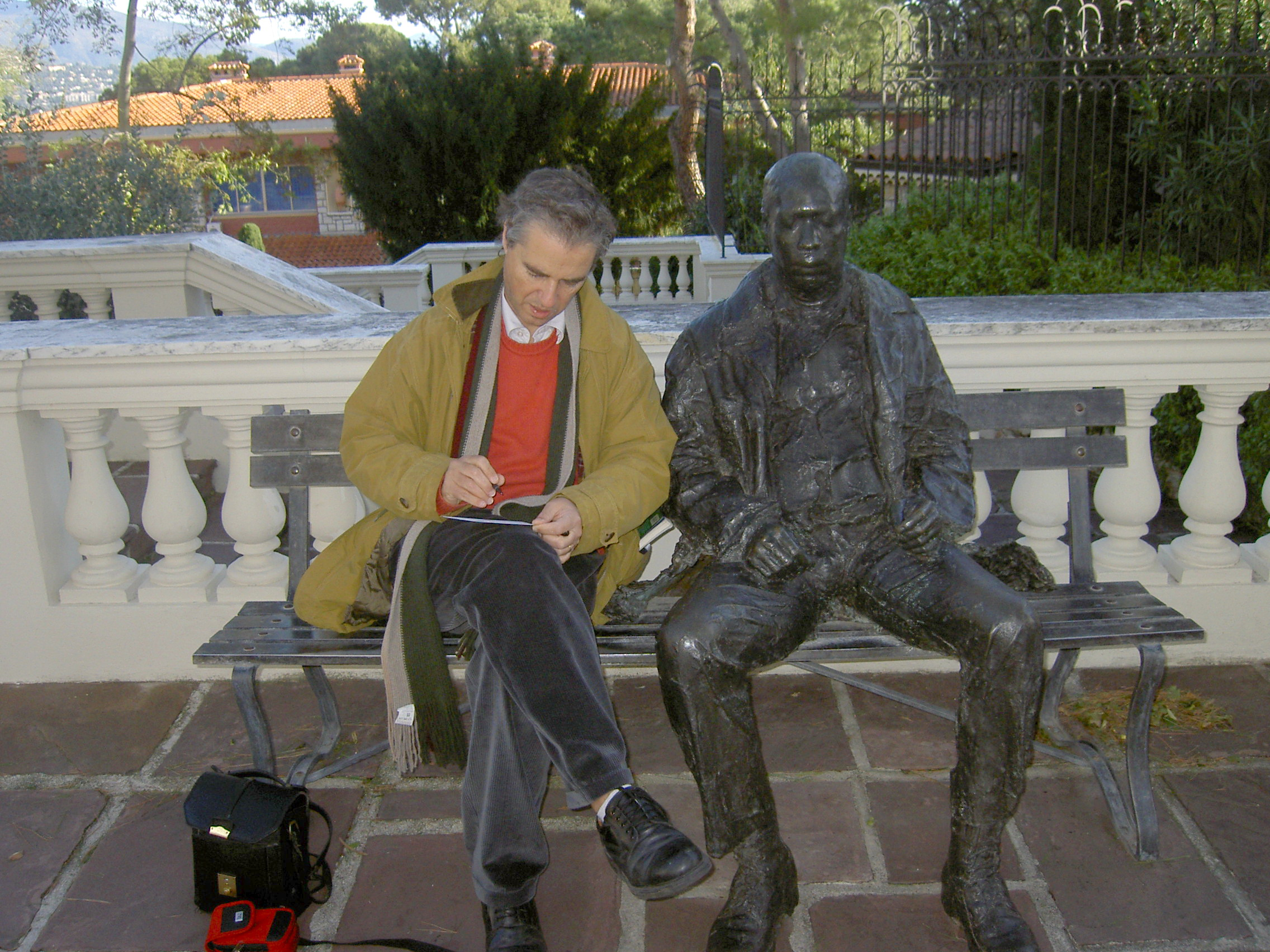
D. Sorrente

Dominique Sorrente is a French poet. He was elected laureate by the Marseille Academy in 1983, and Guy Levis Mano laureate in 1984.

== Biography ==
Dominique Sorrente was born in Nevers (Nièvre) in 1953. He spent his childhood in various cities and regions of France: Marseille, the Morvan’s forests and the Vendée, on the Atlantic coast. After receiving a Jesuit education, he moved in 1970 to Aix-en-Provence where he began to write poetry. When he was 17 years old, he met the poet, Christian Guez-Ricord (1948-1988) who was to have a lasting influence on his work.

In 1975, in Paris, he founded the journal Avalanche which he edited for four years with the novelist, Michel Orcel. After studying Political Sciences and European Studies in Paris, then in Bruges (Belgium), he returned to Marseille where he became a teacher.

His first book, Citadelles et Mers (1978) was published by Mediterranean and International Review Sud. He later became a member of the committee of Sud until its demise in 1997. In 1982, Jean-François Manier an editor at Cheyne editions accepted Sorrente's manuscript La Lampe allumée sur Patmos.

Dominique Sorrente was elected laureate by the Marseille Academy in 1983, and Guy Levis Mano laureate in 1984; he subsequently received several literary Prizes: Luc Bérimont, Antonin Artaud and Louis Guillaume as well as two grants from the Centre national du livre (French Ministry of Culture). Later on, he became a member of different boards such as the Jean Malrieu Prize. Recently (June 2008) he received the Sainte-Victoire Prize in Aix-en-Provence.

Dominique Sorrente has published some twenty books and anthologies, including a bilingual poetry collection, A Crayon for the Rainbow (Publibook, 2003). A new book was published in March 2007, called Mandala des jours (Publibook).

Dominique Sorrente’s writing has also been published in several journals, both in France and abroad. Poems have been translated into English, but also in German, Romanian, Italian and Chinese.

Besides his work as a poet, Dominique Sorrente gives regular readings, lectures and seminars in France and internationally (Prague, Venice, Marrakech, Naples…). He participates regularly in literary events in France, such as the Printemps des Poètes. In 2007, he was invited to the first “Primavera dei poeti” in Turin (Italy).

In 1999, a retrospective exhibition Voix, poème, encre & compagnie dedicated to Dominique Sorrente and other collaborating artists (painters, musicians, sculptors, poets) was organized in Aix-en-Provence by the Saint-John Perse Foundation created in honour of the Nobel Prize winner.

In 1999 Sorrente set up a new meeting-place for poetry in a small sea harbour called the Vallon des Auffes, Marseille, called The Scriptorium. This movement is based on "intuitive poetry" and the desire to stimulate creative links among artists. With the rhythm of semaphore (a time for appearing / a time for vanishing…), it seeks to promote all the resources of poetry in the heart of the city, through conferences, lectures and original experiences called: “intervals”, “poetic caravans”, “literary meals”, “transcontinental events”… An international seminar was held in May 2002 with writers coming from all around the world. For the Unesco International Poetry Day, the Scriptorium organized in 2008 the first edition of La Transcontinentale gathering poets of different continents.

Dominique Sorrente has also held a position as Professor in Culture and Humanities at the Euromed School of Management and in different Graduate Schools in France. He bases his educational research on his central concern for creative management and poetry. He has taught European studies, Ethical Issues and Cultural Management.

In 2006, Dominique Sorrente was selected for an international Residence in Lavigny Castle (Switzerland) by the Ledig-Rowohlt Foundation. In 2007, he was selected by L&Arc (%culturel Migros) for the international artists’ residence in the site of the abbey of Romainmôtier (Switzerland) where he returned in May 2008.

The first prototype of a new concept of poetical DVD, called Pictodramathis (Entracte 1: Lettre à une habitante en chemin – “A missive to a pioneer denizen”) was developed by Sorrente with the photograph and painter, Daniel Vincentscreened at the Salon du Livre in Paris (March 2007).

== Bibliography ==
- Citadelles et Mers (Sud, 1978)
- L'Apparent de Lumière (Les Heures, 1980)
- Ephémérides (Le Lamparo, 1980)
- La Lampe allumée sur Patmos (Cheyne, 1982)
- La Combe obscure (Cheyne, 1985)
- Une Route au milieu de la Nuit (Froissart, 1985)
- Les Voix de Neige (Cheyne, 1988)
- Petite suite des Heures (Cheyne, 1991)
- Une seule phrase pour Salzbourg (Cheyne, 1994)
- Aimer la poésie (Cheyne, 1995)
- La Terre accoisée (Cheyne, 1998)
- Le petit livre de Qo (Cheyne, 2001)
- Un crayon pour l'arc-en-ciel / A crayon for the rainbow (Publibook, 2003)
- Mandala des Jours (Publibook, 2007)
