= Heisler =

Heisler is a surname. Notable people with the surname include:

- Charlene Heisler (1961–1999), Canadian astronomer
- Gregory Heisler (born 1954), American photographer
- L. Heisler Ball (1861–1932), American physician and politician from Delaware
- Marcy Heisler (born 1967), musical theater writer and performer
- Mike Heisler, American comic book writer
- Randy Heisler (born 1961), American discus thrower
- Stuart Heisler (1896–1979), film and television director
- Todd Heisler (born 1972), American photojournalist

== Fictional ==
- Conrad Heisler, character in The Angry Hills (film)
- Heisler Beer, a fictional brand of beer seen in movies and television shows
- Klaus Heisler, a talking fish character in the American television series American Dad!

== See also ==
- Heisler locomotive, a geared steam locomotive

== Other ==
- Heissler
