= Universal Life Church =

Religious organization

- Logo of the Universal Life Church
- Region: Worldwide
- Headquarters: Modesto, California, U.S.
- Founder: Kirby J. Hensley
- Origin: May 2, 1962; Modesto, California, U.S.
- Members: 18,000,000+ ordained
- Official website: www.ulchq.com

The Universal Life Church (ULC) is an American non-denominational religious organization founded in 1962 by Kirby J. Hensley. Its creed is "Do that which is right". The Universal Life Church advocates for religious freedom, offering legal ordination to become a minister free of charge to anyone who wishes to join. The ULC has ordained ministers from a wide range of backgrounds and beliefs, including atheists, Christians, Jews, Neopagans and Wiccans.

The ULC's popularity stems in part from rising interest in having friends or family officiate weddings; surveys reported that one-quarter to one-half of couples married in the United States in 2020 had a friend or family member officiate their wedding ceremony. This trend has attracted a range of celebrities to become ordained including Adele, Benedict Cumberbatch, Ian McKellen, Stevie Nicks, Conan O'Brien, and Steven Tyler.

Appellate courts in Virginia have held that they will not recognize marriages solemnized by ULC ministers, with litigation on the question ongoing as of 2025, while appellate courts in North Carolina have held that such marriages may be voidable. Courts in Indiana, Mississippi, Pennsylvania, Texas, and Utah have specifically held such marriages to be valid, while government officials in Alabama, South Carolina, and Washington have opined that the marriages are acceptable under each state's respective laws.

== History ==
=== Foundation and early growth ===
The Universal Life Church was founded by Kirby J. Hensley, "a self-educated Baptist minister who was deeply influenced by his reading in world religion". Religious scholar James R. Lewis wrote that Hensley "began to conceive of a church that would, on the one hand, offer complete freedom of religion, and could, on the other hand, bring all people of all religions together, instead of separating them". With this aim, he established "a new religion that would emphasize what all religions have in common", creating in 1959 the "Life Church" in Modesto, California. He first held services in his garage, and incorporated the organization in 1962.

The ULC began issuing mail-order ordinations shortly after its incorporation. The church's growth was affected in part by social movements; during the Vietnam War, a widely circulated rumor claimed that ordination would qualify one for a legal exemption from the draft. Ordination requests increased dramatically, but the rumor proved to be false. The ULC and its founder, Hensley, were also featured in several publications during this time, including Rolling Stone, which further increased public awareness of the church. In the late 1960s, Hensley "became something of a folk hero among the young", particularly with college students, whom he would mass-ordain at speaking events. In accordance with the Law of California that exempts religious schools from accreditation, he offered an honorary Doctor of Divinity degree from the ULC for a free-will offering of twenty dollars, including "ten free lessons explaining how to set up a church". By 1974, the church had ordained over 1 million ministers. Also in 1974, a federal judge declared that the ULC was qualified for a religious tax exemption.

=== Later expansion and division ===
The Universal Life Church ran into difficulties as new branches of the ULC were granted charters and began moving off in different directions. The Modesto group struggled to maintain control over these other entities as ULC affiliates grew in number. There are multiple groups operating under the ULC name, most of which are unaffiliated in practice. During this period, the Internal Revenue Service (IRS) became suspicious about tax avoidance efforts within the church, eventually determining that Hensley, the Modesto ULC, and affiliated churches chartered under its name were promoting tax avoidance schemes within church periodicals. As a result, the IRS withdrew ULC Modesto's tax-exempt status in 1984. Over the next 16 years, Hensley and his family battled the IRS in court over disputed tax payments. The matter was eventually settled in 2000 when the Modesto group agreed to pay $1.5 million in back taxes.

By 1999, the ULC had begun offering ordinations online. News coverage about journalists and celebrities getting ordained to perform weddings helped boost the popularity of online ordination. As more people became aware of non-traditional officiants presiding over wedding ceremonies, ULC membership rolls rose. Between 1962 and 2008, the ULC issued more than 18 million ordinations worldwide. A large number of people seeking ULC ordination do so in order to be able to legally officiate at weddings or perform other spiritual rites. A 2007 article noted that "[a]bout 70 percent of people who become ordained through the Universal Life Church do so... to officiate at weddings". According to a 2016 internal survey conducted by wedding website The Knot and reported by the Baltimore Sun, 43% of couples in the U.S. in 2016 chose to have a friend or family member officiate their wedding, up from 29% in 2009. Another example of a person becoming ordained through ULC in order to perform a religious ritual is that of a Native American in Cincinnati, Ohio, who needed such an affiliation to perform smudging ceremonies as part of the prayer ritual for other Native Americans in area hospitals.

Following Kirby Hensley's death in 1999, an organizational split led to the creation of the ULC Monastery (ULCM, also using the name Universal Life Church Ministries; now based in Seattle), which remains unaffiliated with the Modesto group. The ULCM formally split from the ULC in 2006 following financial, legal, and philosophical disputes between the two bodies and began ordaining ministers independently.

== Beliefs and practices ==
The U.S. Department of the Army publication, Religious Requirements and Practices: A Handbook for Chaplains, summarized the doctrines of the ULC as follows:

The Universal Life Church has only one belief. They believe in that which is right and in every person's right to interpret what is right. The Universal Life Church has no creed or authoritative book such as a Bible. Those wishing to learn about the Church can obtain its periodical Universal Life and other materials that it publishes from its international headquarters. No specific ethical guidelines except to do "what is right". ... The Universal Life Church is open and accepting of people of all religions. It is opposed only to those religions that attempt to deny religious freedom. Any minister in the ULC can ordain new members. ... The Universal Life Church has no specific holidays, though local congregations celebrate a wide variety of them. There are two gatherings (conventions) each year in the spring and in the fall, at which the members and ministers meet for celebration and to conduct business.

According to Lewis, Hensley personally believed in reincarnation, in a merely human Jesus, and "in the reunification of all religions and governments under the Universal Life banner during thirty years of turmoil around the year 2000". (Note: the ULC stated that "in St. John 15:16, it says that God called you and has ordained you," as even without viewing Jesus as God, Hensley—in writings compiled between the mid-1980s and 1994—understood that the man Jesus acted out a role after studying the Old Testament in order to act with exactness; thus, it is clear that authentic truths from that Old Testament could also be conveyed—for example, that the Father can choose, ordain, and grant directly—which is the focus of John 15:16, a verse explicitly cited by the ULC as true.) None of these beliefs were doctrinal to the ULC, which allowed members to follow their own doctrines. The U.S. Army's Handbook for Chaplains also notes that the ULC "has a very loose structure", with those ordained being given "a set of instructions on how to form a congregation", but otherwise operating with complete autonomy. It further notes that those ordained "may perform any of the functions normally associated with the clergy, including the conducting of weddings, funerals, etc.", and that "[g]roup worship is not required, but local congregations are required to hold regular meetings". The ULC is noted to have no medical or dietary restrictions, and no specific burial requirements. With respect to military service, the handbook notes that the ULC maintains no doctrinal opposition to military service, but "respects the individual opinion of its members".

== Legal status ==
The legitimacy of ULC ordination has been challenged in legal venues, primarily with respect to the questions of whether it constitutes a religious affiliation for tax purposes, and whether ordinations legally permit recipients to perform weddings in various jurisdictions. Lewis notes that the American Internal Revenue Service has generally assumed a negative predisposition towards the ULC, and has sought to eliminate the organization's tax-exempt status. A number of legal cases have addressed this question, as well as the ordination question, with varying results.

As of 2025, all U.S. states recognize ministers of the Universal Life Church as wedding celebrants except for certain counties in Virginia, with litigation with respect to those counties ongoing as of 2025. In those counties, the solemnization of a marriage by a minister of the Universal Life Church (who is not otherwise authorized) may result in questioning of the validity of the marriage. Historically, such ordinations were more broadly contentious, with Professor Robert Rains, writing in the University of Miami Law Review in 2020 that "even a reasonably intelligent (and suspicious) person could be readily misled by the ULC into believing that by becoming a ULC minister he can legally perform marriages throughout the United States, and beyond". In Canada, ULC ministers are currently not authorized to solemnize marriage in any province or territory. In places where being a ULC minister does not legally authorize a person to solemnize marriages, ULC ministers intending to do so must also meet other requirements, which might include registering as a notary public, justice of the peace, or marriage commissioner.

== Criticism ==
The ULC has occasionally been criticized for its openness and ease of ordination. Some people, usually as a joke, submit ordination requests for their pets. The ULC has tried to curb the ordination of pets, but if the name on the application appears to be legitimate, the application will probably be granted. The ULC website warns against fraudulent ordination requests, including attempts to ordain pets: "No one is rejected because of their name, but we must protect the integrity of the records against those who fraudulently submit requests for pets, obscene names, etc. Applying for ordination in the name of a fictitious person or animal, or the submission of a person's name without his or her permission is fraud, and may subject you to prosecution!". In 2015, The New York Times wrote that the ULC "pumps out ordinations at an assembly-line pace, almost mocking a process that usually requires years of seminary study".

== See also ==
- List of ministers of the Universal Life Church
- Dog Commune
