= Kirby J. Hensley =

President and founder of Universal Life Church

Kirby James Hensley
- Hensley c. 1977
- Born: July 23, 1911
- Died: March 19, 1999 (aged 87)
- Occupations: President and founder of Universal Life Church
- Years active: 1934–1999

Kirby James Hensley (July 23, 1911 – March 19, 1999) was an American minister. He was the president and founder of the Universal Life Church.

== Biography ==
The second of seven children, Hensley was born on July 23, 1911, in the mountains of Low Gap, Yancey County, North Carolina. For more than 65 years he studied and preached religion throughout the United States. He was functionally illiterate; he hired others to read the Bible for him and later listened to recordings of the Bible on tape. Hensley "studied and preached religion" in this manner for 65 years.

Hensley received a doctoral degree (via mail) from an institution named Hollywood University of Los Angeles, then an honorary doctorate in a domain of science from a school in Nebraska.

He was ordained in a branch of the Baptist Church, but after several years he left the denomination and attended the Pentecostal churches in the area. He married his first wife Nora in a Pentecostal ceremony; they had two daughters together. He also pastored in Oklahoma and California.

Hensley later divorced Nora and moved back to North Carolina, where he met his second wife, Lida. During their forty-six-year marriage, they had one daughter and two sons.

Hensley founded the Universal Life Church in 1962. He remained president of the church until his death on March 19, 1999. He compiled many sermons and once appeared on 60 Minutes (also available in printed version — final highlight on page 24, still with Morley Safer, who concludes: "I certainly liked him. He was a wonderful character.").

He ran for President of the United States as the Universal Party's candidate in 1964 and 1968, with Roscoe MacKenna as his running mate.

In the mid-1980s, Hensley called himself the King of Aqualandia and sold citizenship documents, as well as church ordinations, for $35.

== Sources ==
- Ashmore, Lewis (1977). The Modesto messiah: The famous mail-order minister. Universal Press. ISBN 0-918950-01-5.
- Hensley, Kirby J. (1986). The Buffer Zone. Universal Life Church. ASIN B00071NQX0.

Non-profit organization positions
Preceded by Office created	President of the Universal Life Church; 1962–1999	Succeeded by Lida Hensley
