= The Monastery (community center) =

Seattle church and night club

Monastery
- Universal Life Church Monastery
- Interactive map of Monastery
- Address: 1900 Boren Avenue, Seattle, Washington, US
- Coordinates: 47.6173°N 122.3328°W
- Owner: George Freeman
- Type: church

Construction
- Opened: 1977
- Years active: 8

The Monastery was a church in Seattle, Washington, United States, open from 1977 to 1985. Minister George Freeman established and operated it as part of the broader Universal Life Church Monastery religious organization. It was simultaneously a gay church, a gay nightclub, an LGBTQ community center, and a homeless shelter for queer youth. In a typical event, it would host DJs playing dance music at night, then at 2am, Freeman would stop the music and party to deliver a sermon.

Throughout its existence, Freeman defended the organization against opponents including Seattle officials, police, and the organization Parents in Arms as they accused the Monastery of various offenses including alcohol violations and being a public nuisance. In the end, Seattle's government closed the venue and also enacted the Teen Dance Ordinance to ban anything similar. Freeman was a public figure in the media throughout this, with him advocating for civic rights while others denounced him.

== Description ==
In the eight years of the Monastery, nobody was ever stabbed, nobody was ever killed, nobody ever OD'd, nobody ever died. The only security we ever used were two people at the front door, the ushers. And yet we ran the gamut of black people, white people, young people, old people, gay people, straight people. All in one head space. The most integrated institution ever to exist in this city! Probably it will never exist again.

— George Freeman, The Stranger

In 1977, George Freeman used his own savings to establish the Monastery at 1900 Boren Avenue in Seattle. The church hosted dance parties and welcomed gay people. Commentators also described the church as a gay nightclub. The church encouraged joyful celebration and taught that homosexuality and bisexuality were equally valid to heterosexuality. Freeman's objective was to establish a network of gay churches where people could openly express their sexuality while enjoying music in a party setting with alcohol. Freeman also offered refuge in the church for homeless children and runaways, and at one point, 15 homeless youth were living there.

The Monastery was a private membership organization which required social club registration to enter. While anyone over age 16 could join, only certain people over age 21 had access to a private space where alcohol was available and consumed.

The Monastery affiliated with the broader Universal Life Church, which praised the Monastery's activities and advocated for it against criticism in 1983 and 1985.

== Legal issues ==
=== October 1977 police action ===
On October 9, 1977, police entered the Monastery during a social event. The police were not in uniform and were attempting an undercover operation, but Monastery patrons immediately identified them as outsiders. The police then claimed the right to use the building's public address system to tell everyone to leave the building. When Freeman refused to give them the microphone, they arrested him and two guests ages 18 and 22 for obstruction of justice. Police also charged Freeman with dispensing alcohol, and as evidence, they identified one empty beer can in a waste container, two glasses containing liquid which might have been alcohol, and the smell of cannabis.

The case went to trial at the Seattle Municipal Court where Freeman was found not guilty. Freeman remarked that the police in the church failed to find alcohol. He said that when the police told him to end the event at the church, he turned the music off when the event was scheduled to end; not before, and not because the police told him to do so. He accused police of harassing church patrons. He said that as a church hosting membership events he had lists of attendees and members, and that in this round of police interaction the police again demanded that he turn over the church's membership list to them. Freeman argued that the police wanted the list so that they could harass them. In response to the arrests the Washington Coalition for Sexual Minority Rights planned a rally in protest at the Public Safety Building. 75 people demonstrated at that protest. Freeman gave a report of the situation to the American Civil Liberties Union.

=== May 1978 police action ===
On May 19, 1978, Freeman hosted a fundraiser at the Monastery in opposition to Seattle Initiative 13, which was a proposed government regulation to permit employers and landlords to fire and evict people if they were known to be homosexual. The event's presenters were LGBT-rights activist Jerry DeGrieck, the Seattle Committee Against (Initiative) 13, and the Washington Coalition for Sexual Minorities. In advance of the event the organizers had applied for and received a banquet permit, which is a license to host a private banquet with alcohol. 300 people attended the banquet. At 9pm police came and issued Freeman a citation for serving alcohol. Seattle police officer David Estes was the lead organizer who registered and promoted Seattle Initiative 13. Attendees at the event accused the police of being anti-gay and supportive of their fellow police officer's initiative.

=== 1979 name dispute ===
In 1976 a Christian church near Seattle established itself with the name "The Sanctuary". In 1980 Freeman was using the name "the Sanctuary" to describe the Monastery church and disco. The Christian church sued the Monastery for use of the same name as a type of Intellectual property infringement. In response, Freeman said that lots of churches use the name "sanctuary" so there is no problem. As a way of helping people understand the difference between the Monastery and the other church, Freeman said that at the Monastery they played music like "We Are Family" and "Born to be Alive". Freeman also said that the sexuality of Jesus was not heterosexuality. When served the lawsuit, Freeman said that the other church had never contacted him, and that he was hearing their complaint for the first time through the legal filing.

=== July 1979 police action ===
In April 1980 the Seattle court fined Freeman $150 for serving alcohol in the Monastery without a license in the summer of 1979. Undercover police had paid $7 for what the church called a tithe before they entered the Monastery on June 30 and July 14 1979. The police sought alcohol, but plain orange juice was the only drink available. Freeman's private residence was in a restricted part of the church. The undercover police asked Freeman for permission to go into this area, and Freeman personally allowed them. When in that restricted area, there was unattended alcohol available for any guest to serve themselves. Freeman did not have a banquet permit for the evening and the Monastery did not have a liquor license. Freeman's lawyer was John Henry Browne. During the court proceedings those present noted that the Monastery was a registered religious organization with the Universal Life Church. The prosecutor remarked that the activities of the Monastery were not religious. Freeman did not appeal the fine.

=== July 1980 police action ===
On March 13, 1981, Freeman was convicted in court for having violated Washington state liquor law in summer of 1980. Previously undercover police had entered the Monastery on July 19, 26, and August 2, 1980. They observed that the Monastery had public and private areas. The private area was marked with a sign which read, "Residential Area – by invitation only". Freeman's residence was in that private area. Freeman allowed certain people to enter his home and have alcohol there. The prosecutor requested the maximum penalty for Freeman, which was a fine of $300 for each of the three days the police came.

=== December 1980 police action ===
In December 1980 police raided the Spokane branch of the church. The stated cause of the raid was a complaint from the Washington State Liquor Control Board. At the time of the raid, Freeman claimed that the Liquor Control Board was discriminating against Spokane gay bars by failing to grant liquor licenses in response to their outstanding applications. When the police raided the Spokane church, they took the membership lists. Freeman claimed that the police had no need to take the list, and by taking it, the police were carelessly exposing personal data of gay people and increasing their risk of experiencing harassment for being gay.

When Freeman went to court he was convicted and had to pay $4 in court costs while penalties of 30 days in jail and a $50 fine were a suspended sentence. Soon after, Freeman closed the Spokane church.

=== March 1981 tobacco machine ===
Until March 1981 the Monastery had a cigarette machine inside. Freeman was fined $20 for having the machine without a having a business license. At court the judge noted that churches do not need to have a license for such machines, and since the machine was not in a business, the regulation did not apply.

=== April 1981 police raid ===
Police alleged to have observed liquor law violations at the Monastery on April 7, 1981. The matter went to court where Freeman was sentenced to 60 days in jail and a $900 fine. Freeman claimed in court that he was a victim of discrimination, but the judge disagreed. A representative of the Washington State Liquor Board testified, and said that the Monastery was ineligible for a liquor license due to staying open past 2am. The judge scolded the liquor board for having unclear, unpublished criteria for deciding when an organization may have permits and licenses.

=== May 1981 Freeman sues government ===
In May 1981 Freeman filed a lawsuit alleging harassment by Seattle government agencies and individuals, and seeking $4 million as the legal remedy. Freeman described that he is a minister of the Universal Life Church, and that by the First Amendment to the United States Constitution he can operate his church as he wishes. He explained that the Monastery receives money like any church, but that there is no excess or profit. He explained that to enter the Monastery, he requests but does not require patrons to donate $7. There is no alcohol available in the main church area. For certain people who are checked and over age 21, he permits to enter a closed part of the church which is his home, and some people there have alcohol. Freeman described that he is repeatedly arrested and wanted it to stop.

=== September 1982 police action ===
At 2:30am on Saturday, September 11, 1982, a police raid of 30 officers entered the Monastery and issued 250 citations to people at the Monastery for being present in a place where alcohol was being illegally served. Their stated reason for the raid was multiple liquor violations, which they said they had observed in previous undercover operations. The raid did not close the Monastery, and it was open as usual the night after the raid.

There were 224 people who received citations. The news media described those cited as gay men of all ages and also male and female teenagers. News described the church at this time as unknown, except to homosexual men, teenagers, and the police. In the venue overall, the youngest person cited was age 15, and the oldest was age 47. Freeman said that the Monastery was a homeless shelter for youth homelessness and had 15 minor youths living there.

Police noted that the Monastery had public and private areas, and that the alcohol was in the private balcony area. There were 50 people in the private balcony, two of which were found to be age 17 and the only ones present under age 21. Freeman would later clarify that the two underage males were residents living in the Monastery. Police sought and took the Monastery book member registry, which listed 4000 people.

Police detained everyone present and compelled them to be photographed over a 2-hour period. The only three people arrested that night were Freeman and the two boys. Police reported taking all the alcohol they found.

After the raid, those cited coordinated with each other to request individual jury trials for everyone. This action baffled the court system, which could not accommodate that many trials. In October 1982 the police dropped the charges against everyone in the raid except for three adults in the balcony. Police claimed that a total of 15 people were near alcohol, but at court they could only identify those three from the photos they took. At court, Judge John W. Darrah found no evidence that other people were consuming alcohol.

When the charges were dropped, one of the two boys arrested was in a youth detention center, and rather than be returned to his parents, his father requested that the boy be allowed to return to live at the Monastery. For the three who kept their charges, one entered a diversion program, one got their charge dismissed, and the other demanded a hearing on constitutionality. 199 people had no further court interaction in this case. 20 of them agreed to do community service. Seattle Mayor Charles Royer made a new alcohol ordinance following this occurrence.

Later in February 1983, the prosecutor filed charges against Freeman himself for findings during the raid. In a related hearing, a judge found that the law the police used to raid the Monastery was too vague to apply in this situation. The prosecutor filed charges against Freeman for new and different reasons.

In response to all this, Freeman claimed that the police had a continuing program of harassment against him and his church. He said that the police were chilling the freedom of religion and freedom of association of all church members. He said that his activities and those of the Monastery were religious, and that the police were vindictive. He also called the police repetitive. Freeman said that it was great that the charges were dropped against church members. When Freeman was charged with crimes months after the raid, he commented that the reason for the delay was that the police originally found no reason to charge him, but since everyone else won in court, they had to accuse him of something to justify the $50,000 that they spent on the raid.

=== April 1983 police raid ===
On Saturday, April 2, 1983, at 2:35am police entered the Monastery and cited 61 people for alcohol related offenses. Freeman was arrested for distributing liquor without a license. Police seized all the alcohol in the building, which was 2 bottles of champagne and 4 kegs of beer.

In court Freeman explained that the Monastery building was separated into a public disco and his private residence, and that the alcohol was in his private residence. He characterized the accusations as a disturbance of his private life, and remarked "I can't even have a beer with friends at home". Freeman was sentenced to pay a $3000 fine. Freeman attributed his conviction to racism in the legal system, and said, "The gut issue is that I'm black and I'm queer. That bothers a lot of people. So what we have is a vice squad that has a mandate to prosecute sin."

In 1986 Freeman faced a total of 10 months of jail time which combined convictions from alcohol violations in 1981 this 1983 one.

=== July 1983 Freeman sues media ===
In July 1983 Freeman filed lawsuits against television station KIRO-TV and newspaper The Seattle Times. Freeman complained that both had described the Monastery as a "homosexual discotheque church", and that KIRO TV used videos of the Monastery as a way of explaining the HIV/AIDS epidemic.

=== Parents in Arms ===
In 1984, a Seattle area attorney established a community organization called Parents in Arms. The organization had the goal of closing the Monastery and petitioning the Seattle City Council for nightlife regulation.

David Crosby, the attorney who established the organization, did so after his 14-year-old son chose to run away and become homeless after a history of teenage rebellion and attending drug rehabilitation services. Crosby asked Freeman to deny his son entrance to the Monastery. Freeman expressed his belief that if a young person prefers homelessness over staying at home, then they have a right to leave.

Crosby sent legal letters to the Monastery. Freeman made copies of those letters, and distributed them to Monastery members. Crosby accused Freeman of rallying church members against him, and of inciting church members to threaten his life.

=== April 1985 abatement of Monastery ===
In April 1985 Seattle prosecutor Norm Maleng filed to have the city close the Monastery as a public nuisance in need of nuisance abatement. David Crosby with his organization Parents in Arms joined the prosecution as witnesses against the Monastery and Freeman.

In telling the story of the Monastery, news media discussed Freeman's personal history and accusations against him regarding alcohol distribution. The Seattle Times noted that seven local nightclubs admitted teenagers, and warned that although the public may imagine that their events were sock hops, instead they were hubs of street gang activity. In the midst of this, the filmmaker who produced the 1984 documentary Streetwise described how the street youth in their film experienced the Monastery.

Prosecutor Maleng filed many affidavits in which police and parents alleged various criminal behavior in the Monastery. Freeman dismissed all accusations, saying that they represented the fears of parents whose children were engaged in typical teenage rebellion. Freeman said that the Monastery does not condone drug use. Freeman said that he was experiencing harassment due to being black and queer, and also discrimination based on conflict between Christianity and homosexuality.

One complaint about the Monastery was that people sold drugs inside. Police declined to name particular drugs which were sold, claiming that there were so many different types that they were unable to remember them all. They compared the drug buying experience to shopping at a supermarket. One officer who was undercover in the Monastery testified that they encountered a drug dealer who was wearing a trench coat lined with pre-filled syringes full of drugs, which they sold out of their jacket for immediate use by Monastery patrons.

Police criticized the Monastery's unisex public toilets because people could use them regardless of gender. Inside the Monastery, girls were allowed to kiss other girls, which the police found problematic. Police said that multiple male prostitutes approached them unsolicited to offer sex for sale. The police also alleged that teenage panhandlers begged the police for money to buy drugs. The police described how the Monastery had a movie projector which it used to screen violent movies that were harmful to watch. They observed that the Monastery's events hosted about 600 people, mostly teenagers, and that attendees viewed the Monastery as a place to get drugs, do drugs, and hookup. Various accounts reported observing either unconscious people at the Monastery, such as a girl suffering from a drug overdose on the street near the club, or a boy passed out in the toilet.

The prosecution's best evidence was from a former Monastery member who self-identified as having sold drugs there and who testified to gain immunity from prosecution. This person told the court that almost every night at the Monastery, someone would overdose on drugs and that other attendees would restrain the overdosing person until an ambulance took them away. They testified that the number of drug dealers operating out of the Monastery ranged from 3 to 7 depending on the night. Furthermore, testimonies alleged that less successful drug dealers would sell only $300–600 of drugs per night, but that other individuals sold much more. Stringer described that typical church activities included nude dancing on the dance floor, sexual intercourse in the hot tub, and oral sex throughout the venue. When Freeman cross-examined Stringer asking him why he was testifying, Stringer explained that he was doing so to atone for his wrongdoing.

The court asked a local social worker about the Monastery. This social worker was an employee for the youth homeless shelter, and their specialty was supporting homeless teenage sex workers. He told the court that one of his clients was a 13 year old sex worker, and that this boy reported being a member of the Monastery, and that he visited the Monastery with this boy.

The trial lasted 10 days, and ordered the Monastery closed at its conclusion. Freeman complained of discrimination for being black and queer.

== Legacy ==
The Teen Dance Ordinance was a Seattle local ordinance which had the effect of prohibiting people under age 21 from attending music and entertainment events from 1985 to 2002. Freeman described it as the "George Freeman Law", explaining that the point of the law was to prevent the establishment of another venue like the Monastery. In 1995, Krist Novoselic of the Seattle rock band Nirvana formed a political action committee which had the goal of getting the Teen Dance Ordinance repealed and promoting Seattle's music scene. This organization was key in the repeal of the ordinance in 2002.

In 1988 Freeman planned a night club near Seattle University. A representative of the university ordered students to avoid the night club and asked the city to close it, arguing that it was harmful to students. Freeman opened the club as a community center but prohibited dancing. The university administration noted that Freeman had a reputation of being homosexual. George Bakan, the editor of Seattle Gay News, said that the fear and complaints were unwarranted, and that the complaints were only due to discrimination due to Freeman being black and gay.

The Universal Life Church Monastery is a multi-religious interfaith ministry that has an online ordination program. It first established a website that allowed individuals to apply for ordination in 1995. George Freeman is its minister.

== Further consideration ==
- Zwickel, Jonathan; Martin, Matt; Gates, Jim (29 August 2024). "Let the Kids Dance! Part 1: City Gone Crazy". KUOW-FM. NPR.
