= George Freeman (minister) =

American religious leader

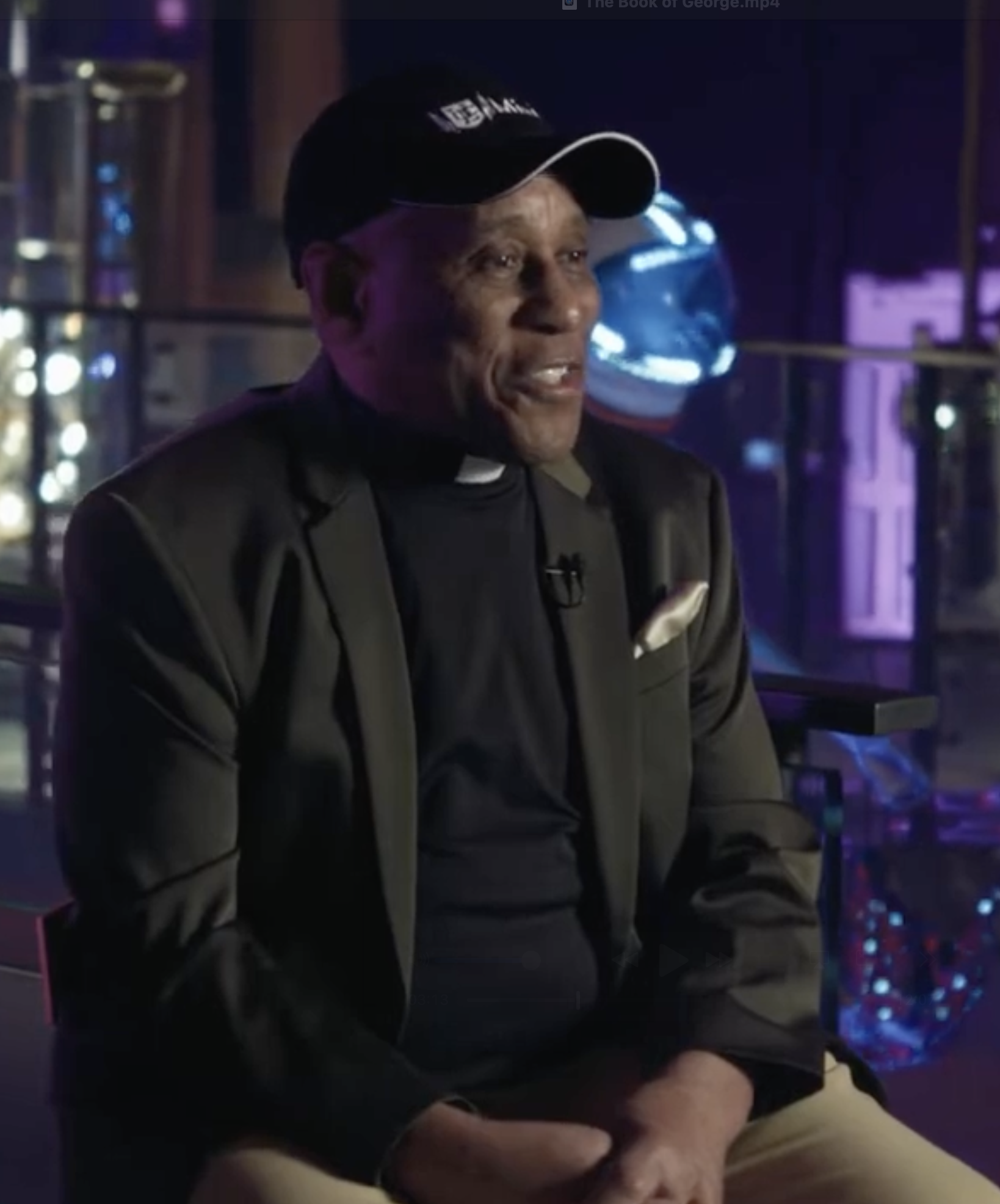
- Freeman in 2025
- Born: 1939 (age 86–87); Spokane, Washington, US
- Education: New York City College
- Occupation: Chaplain
- Years active: 1977–present
- Website: www.georgefreeman.com

George Freeman (born 1938/39) is an American religious leader who is the founder and chaplain of the Universal Life Church Monastery, which is a religious organization known for freely offering ordination to anyone who requests it through the Internet. From 1978 to 1988, Freeman was the minister who ran the Seattle gay church, The Monastery. The Monastery was simultaneously a church, a gay nightclub, an LGBTQ community center, and a homeless shelter for queer youth. Although The Monastery had a base of supporters, it also had strong opposition including Seattle officials, police, and the organization Parents in Arms. In the end, Seattle's government closed the venue and also enacted the Teen Dance Ordinance to ban anything similar. Freeman was a public figure in the media throughout this, with him advocating for civic rights while others denounced him.

As a youth growing up in Spokane, Washington, Freeman experienced racial discrimination for being black and homophobia for being bisexual. When he was 26 years old he was convicted of robbery in New York, and served 4 years in prison. After his release, the New York City government commended him for his participation in rehabilitation and career success.

In 1995 Freeman began operating the Monastery as a website in the network of the Universal Life Church. In 2006 the Monastery and the original Universal Life Church split legally and financially. Freeman has led the Universal Life Church Monastery ever since.

Freeman has twice campaigned to join Seattle City Council, but neither time was elected. As minister, political candidate, and in his personal life, Freeman's activist causes include freedom of religion, opposition to racial discrimination and homophobia, and city initiatives to reduce homelessness.

== Early life ==
George Freeman was born in 1938 or 1939. He grew up in Spokane, Washington. His uncle was a Pentecostal minister. While a youth he worked for the Spokane Daily Chronicle. As a young man he recognized his identity as a black bisexual man, and experienced grief from discrimination. He attempted suicide twice.

In 1965 Freeman joined a team of thieves who committed 8 robberies over a period of two weeks. That same year he was arrested and remained in prison 4½ years until he was released on parole. His first job out of prison was making bumpers for cars. He took a clerk position at the Fortune Society, which is a New York City-based rehabilitation organization, and later was promoted to manager there. Following that he sold plastics for Bemis Company. In 1972 he joined radio station WOR-FM selling air time, and in 1974 at age 35 was earning $21,000/year in this role. For this career progression, New York City Commissioner George F. McGrath described Freeman as a good model participant of the parole system working, and also recognized Freeman's desire to be politically active. Speaking of his experience, Freeman said, "It was hell, but for every negative stroke I've received in my life, I've had two positive strokes to counter it."

== Religious activities ==
=== The Monastery ===
In 1977 Freeman used his own savings to establish a church called The Monastery on Boren Street in Seattle. The church hosted dance parties and welcomed gay people. The church had a public reputation for being a gay nightclub, and Freeman also described it as a shelter for homeless youth. It was a membership organization which required social club registration to enter. At 2am, Freeman would pause the music and party to give a sermon.

Through the church, Freeman encouraged joyful celebration and taught that homosexuality and bisexuality were equally valid to heterosexuality. Freeman's objective was to establish a network of gay churches where people could openly express their sexuality while enjoying music in a party setting with alcohol. He explained that churches routinely serve sacramental wine and do not require an alcohol license to do so.

Various community members objected to the church and its programs. A writer for The Seattle Times characterized it as a "teenage hellhole", and warned that the city closely monitor Freeman's activities. The closure of the Monastery led to Seattle establishing the Teen Dance Ordinance to regulate city nightlife.

=== Universal Life Church ===
Freeman established The Monastery in alignment with an existing organization, the Universal Life Church. In 1983, the Universal Life Church reviewed The Monastery, and reported that Freeman's management was in compliance with the standards of the broader church. That probe also considered complaints against the Freeman and judged them to be without merit. In response to later court actions, the church leadership gave the opinion that Freeman was the target of a conspiracy which had the effect of depriving people of religious freedom. In 1985 the Universal Life Church made the offer to hear, recognize, and arbitrate anyone's complaints about Freeman or the Monastery.

=== Universal Life Church Monastery ===
The Universal Life Church Monastery first established a website that allowed individuals to apply for ordination in 1995. It split from the Modesto-based Universal Life Church in 2006 following financial and legal disputes between the two bodies. Universal Life Church Monastery then began ordaining ministers through its own website.

=== Legal issues ===
Freeman recognizes that he has been called to court on numerous occasions but dismisses the validity of accusations against him. In response to Freeman's practice of appearing in court without a lawyer, Seattle newspaper The Stranger quipped that in matters of both law and theology he was known for representing himself. Freeman was not convicted.

Freeman was charged with distributing alcohol without a liquor license on several occasions. In the late 1970s in Spokane he was convicted of a misdemeanor liquor violation. He was charged twice with liquor violations in Seattle, and acquitted in 1977 but convicted in 1979. The penalty for that conviction was a fine of $150, which he accepted while insisting his innocence but declining to appeal. In 1981 he was charged with distributing alcohol in both Seattle and Spokane. On appeal, one of Freeman's 1981 convictions was upheld, and he was sentenced to 60 days in jail and a $900 fine. He spent one week in jail for the 1981 conviction. On May 14, 1986, Freeman was incarcerated in Seattle for 1981 and 1983 convictions for distributing alcohol. His sentence was for 10 months.

When the Monastery was operational as a disco, Freeman also used part of the building as his home. Freeman characterized conviction as an intrusion on his home life with the remark, "I can't even have a beer with friends at home".

== Politics ==
In the 1999, 2006, and 2021 elections for Seattle City Council, Freeman stood as candidate for election. He was not elected. His campaign platform included support for city public works projects., homelessness services, tax on guns, and work release programs for convicted persons.
