= George Freeman =

George Freeman may refer to:

- George W. Freeman (1789–1858), Episcopal bishop in America
- George Freeman (bookmaker) (1935–1990), Australian racing identity
- George Freeman (comics) (born 1951), Canadian comic book penciller, inker, and colorist
- George Freeman (cricketer) (1843–1895), English first-class cricketer
- George Freeman (guitarist) (1927–2025), American jazz guitarist
- George Freeman (newspaper editor), Irish-American newspaper editor
- George Freeman (politician) (born 1967), Member of UK Parliament for Mid-Norfolk
- George Freeman (pianist), American jazz pianist, composer, and producer
- George Freeman (minister), American leader of the Universal Life Church Monastery
