= George McGrath =

George McGrath may refer to:

- George McGrath (field hockey)
- George McGrath (footballer)
- George McGrath (jockey) (1943–2022), Irish jockey
- George F. McGrath (died 1988), United States police commissioner
