= Advanced Security Training Institute =

- Formation: 2003
- Founder: Yisroel Stefansky
- Headquarters: Brooklyn, New York

The Advanced Security Training Institute (ASTI) is an American nonprofit organization that instructs law enforcement, emergency responders, veterans, and other professionals in security and safety methods through trainings in Israel. Founded in 2003 by Israeli and American dual citizen Yisroel Stefansky, ASTI is based in Brooklyn, New York.

== Background ==
American law enforcement training programs in Israel are held by the ASTI, Anti-Defamation League, American Israel Public Affairs Committee, the Jewish Institute for National Security in America, and the Georgia International Law Enforcement Exchange.

== History ==
ASTI received tax exempt status in 2016.

In August 2025, the Seattle Gay News reported that Stefansky had "built a network inside Seattle's government", citing public records showing communications between Stefansky and director of Seattle’s Office of Emergency Management (OEM), Curry Mayer, former Seattle Fire Department Deputy Chief Jay Hagen, Rebecca Gonzalez and Charles Cordova, Seattle Fire Department Chiefs, and Ed Murray, former Seattle Mayor.

In 2026, Prism Reports published an investigative report series titled "The ASTI Files". The reports included an article on Pierce County Sheriff’s Office (PCSO) Detective Chris Adamson, who was involved in the involved in 2009 alleged Army spying scandal in Washington state, had participated in ASTI trainings in Israel. Another report described ASTI group training lectures that included stereotypes of Muslims, including portraying devoute Muslims as inherently dangerous.
