= Malawi Network of AIDS Services =

Non-governmental organisation in Malawi

Malawi Network of AIDS Services (MANASO) is a membership-based organization in Malawi that aims at facilitating other community organisations to work in harmony in advancing the fight against HIV/AIDS in Malawi. It is a local non-governmental organization primarily dedicated to contributing to the reduction of HIV and minimizing of suffering caused by the HIV epidemic in Malawi. The organisation archives its roles through coordination and capacity building, as well as mobilization. The organizations also tends to allocate resources to AIDS Service Organizations (ASOs) in Malawi. The organisation is registered under the state laws of Malawi and follows requirements of the statutory. The organisation was found in 1996 to coordinate and network the activities of AIDS Service Organisations in Malawi.
