= Inter Alia =

Inter Alia or Inter alia may refer to:

- Inter alia, a Latin phrase for "among other things"
- Inter Alia (play), by Suzie Miller, 2025
- In·ter a·li·a, a 2017 album by At the Drive-In
- Inter Alia, a 1997 album by Marcus Johnson
