= Samaritans Foundation =

Australian charity

Samaritans Foundation (or Samaritans) is an Australian-based charity operating in New South Wales. The organisation provides a number of social support services for the homeless and people with disabilities.

== History ==
The roots of Samaritans was the Newcastle Anglican Board of Social Work operated by the Anglican Church in Newcastle. On October 14, 1984, the Newcastle Anglican Board of Social Work was redefined as the Samaritans Foundation (or “Samaritans”) with the expressed mission to “assist in the expansion of the social and community service work within the Diocese.” The organisation's early work began with a few key services including emergency relief, a family centre and op shops.

== Homeless shelters ==
Samaritans operates a number of homelessness support services including youth refuges and women's shelters.

=== Youth refuges ===
Samaritans operates two youth refuges providing emergency accommodation for homeless youth. The refuges are:

- Samaritans Youth Accommodation (Newcastle), formerly known as Clarendene House; and,
- Samaritans Youth Accommodation (Maitland), formerly known as Maitland Youth Crisis Centre.

=== Women's shelters ===
Following the NSW government's Going Home Staying Home homelessness program, a number of women's refuges were closed, while others which had previously been feminist run domestic violence refuges were handed over to large charity providers. In the wake of the reforms, Samaritans took over operations of the Kempsey Women's Refuge, now operating as the Kempsey Homeless Support Service for Women.

== People ==
In February 2016, Samaritans appointed Peter Gardiner as the organisation's new CEO. The previous CEO, Cec Shevels, had held the post for 25 years before announcing his retirement from the Anglican organisation.

== See also ==
- Homelessness in Australia
