= Parents in Arms =

Civic organization

Parents in Arms was a community organization active in the 1980s in Seattle which petitioned the Seattle City Council for the creation of the Teen Dance Ordinance. Seattle-area attorney David Crosby established it in 1985 when his 14-year-old son Ian ran away from home after various acts of teenage rebellion. The closure of The Monastery, a church and disco with gay youth patrons, was an objective of the organization.

== Crosby family ==
In fall 1984 parents David C. Crosby and Maureen Crosby became concerned that Ian, their 14-year-old son and only child, had been leaving their Renton, Washington home to party at teen nightlife clubs in Seattle. Crosby was an attorney, and he used his knowledge of legal systems to organize a civic response.

Ian began to engage in teenage rebellion He offended his parents by getting a Mohawk hairstyle. During arguments Ian recited lyrics at his parents from the David Bowie song, "Changes", which also upset them. He became disinterested in school and got poor grades. Because of arguments with his parents he preferred to spend as much time away from home as possible, only returning there to sleep when he had nowhere else to go. He tried living at home with minimal parental interaction so his parents began to enforce rules on him. After some time his parents gave him an ultimatum: he could join troubled teenager programs in either wilderness therapy or drug rehabilitation. Instead, Ian ran away from home to live as a homeless youth on the streets in Seattle. When Ian was free of his parents, one of his activities was attending nightlife events at the Monastery. Crosby eventually found Ian and promised that he would not send him away. Instead he sent him to drug rehabilitation in the Midwestern United States, which was another region of the country. Ian left that treatment facility as a runaway on December 31, 1984. While a runaway, Ian moved in with an adult gay man in the gay village of Capitol Hill, Seattle. While his son was a runaway, Crosby asked George Freeman, who was operator of the Monastery, to prohibit his son from that organization. In response, Freeman said that at age 14 Ian had a right to leave his parents' home if he wished. Crosby gave Freeman a written letter making requests about Ian and the Monastery, and in response, Freeman made copies of that letter which he shared freely with anyone at the Monastery. Crosby took offense at the publication of his requests.

== Organization goals ==
Because of Ian's behavior and his views on Seattle nightlife, Crosby established Parents in Arms as a civic organization to seek new city regulations. Crosby set the tone of the organization as militant, ready to fight, in support of police and prosecutors, and in opposition to nightlife. The first goal of Parents in Arms was to close the Monastery.

Crosby complained that in Seattle, young people who wished to leave home could find support systems outside their families to help them do so. He also complained that drug rehabilitation centers would only admit teenagers who consented to treatment, when he felt that parents should be able to involuntarily commit their minor children if they were engaged in substance abuse. Crosby wanted a teen curfew law in Seattle. Parents in Arms viewed teen nightclubs as corrupting to youth and sought to eliminate them. Crosby said that the age for clubs should be 16.

Activities that Parents in Arms supported instead included joining youth farming organizations such as 4-H or Future Farmers of America. Life as portrayed in the 1960s Andy Griffith Show was also described as a model. Supporters felt that rural teenagers had better lifestyles because they were cleaner and healthier, and unlike the scruffy Seattle Center youths who had wild hairstyles and wore makeup. While supporters recognized that rural teenagers also used illicit drugs, the parents felt that drug use was more problematic in urban settings.

== Reactions ==
Crosby said that after establishing Parents in Arms, he, his wife, and his son Ian became the target of death threats.

In February 1985 George Freeman, chaplain of the Monastery, attended a Parents in Arms meeting with a group of supporters. In response to accusations, Freeman said that he and the Monastery do not condone drug use. Daniel Zimmerman, a representative of the Universal Life Church, offered to mediate the dispute between Crosby and the Monastery. Parents in Arms compiled a large amount of evidence and accusations against Freeman, the Monastery, and Seattle nightlife. Years later, Freeman reiterated that none of this evidence was true, and remarked that the accusations never led to convictions.

In a May 1985 protest attended by hundreds of teenagers, a counter-protest group called Youth in Arms got signatures of support on a written statement to counter the accusations of Parents in Arms. The teenagers claimed that Parents in Arms was portraying them as drug-crazed perverts, when actually they were typical kids doing normal social activities. The teenagers acknowledged that drug use exists and that some young people have sex, but that at the Monastery and in general they were normal people being blamed for extreme behavior. One commented that if the clubs were closed, then suddenly the 1000 teenagers who go out for socializing will no longer have a place to go. Many teenagers reported that they went to nightclubs and neither used drugs nor observed drug use, including a group presenting for the Lynnwood High School newspaper. Another report shared was from the Washington State Board of Tax Appeals, which praised the Monastery for having a business model which was able to arrange housing and counseling to counter youth homelessness. Another group which protested in favor of the Monastery was Kids in Action.

== Teen Dance Ordinance ==
In 1985 Seattle prosecutor Norm Maleng sought Nuisance abatement for the Monastery. Parents in Arms hired attorney William Lee Dwyer to advocate for their case. At one point the judge assigned to the case was Terrence A. Carroll. Carroll disqualified himself because he was a juvenile court judge with strong views on runaway youth. Crosby persuaded Carroll to agree to join him as a witness supporting Parents in Arms in the trial. In court Crosby said that his son was in drug therapy because of the Monastery and Seattle nightlife. Freeman expressed that the pool of judges overseeing the case were biased against the perspective of youth nightlife supporters.

The result was that city closed the Monastery, and that closure began the planning of teen dance regulation in Seattle.

After the closure of the Monastery, Mike Zeitner, the vice president of Parents in Arms, opposed the opening of other teen dance clubs. Zeitner's two 17-year old sons had run away from his home earlier that year. Parents in Arms also opposed another teen night club, Skoochies, from moving into the building formerly occupied by the Monastery.
