= George Freeman (pianist) =

American jazz musician

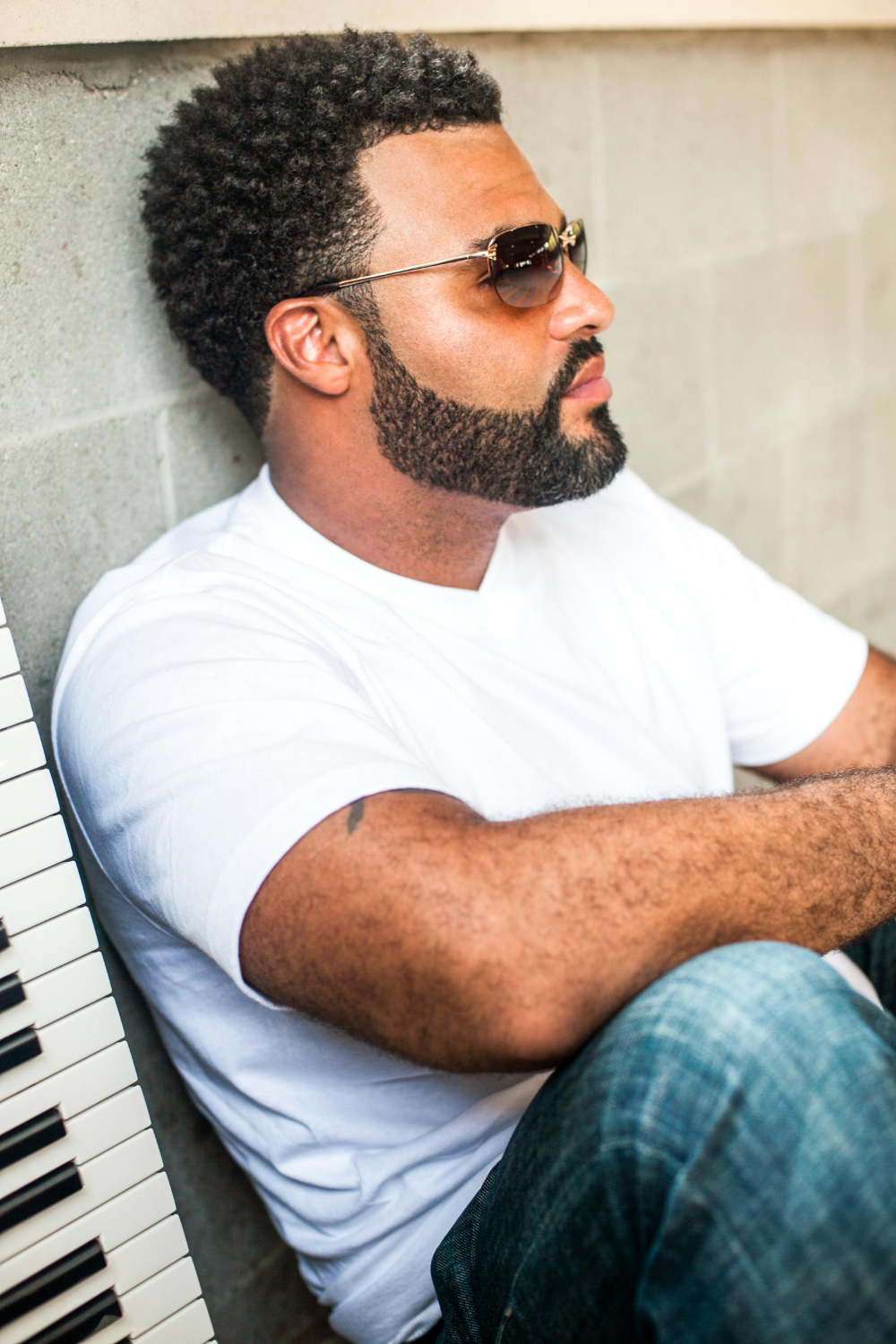
George Freeman, American Jazz Pianist

George Freeman is an American jazz pianist, composer, and producer, from North Carolina.

- Freeman's musical career began on a professional level when he first accompanied Pamela Williams, jazz saxophonist, at the 1st Annual Jazz on the River Festival in Fayetteville, North Carolina, for then WFSS 91.9, in October 2006. From that point, Freeman worked behind the scenes writing, arranging, playing, producing and directing for other jazz artists to include Karen Briggs, Eric Darius, Marcus Johnson and many others.
- On September 21, 2011, he and then Main Street the Band, played for the late Vesta Williams at her final performance on September 17, 2011, in Portsmouth, Virginia at the Autumn Jazz Explosion. Part of this performance is viewable on the Vesta Williams - Unsung documentary, which was released on January 2, 2012.
- In 2015, Freeman released his first album, Make It Happen, for Low Key Productions. The first single, "Night Lights", released to radio in March 2015, and placed 27th on the Billboard Smooth Jazz Song Chart on May 30, 2015.

== Discography ==
Year	Album/Single	Genre	Label
2019	Limitless	Jazz	Low Key Productions
2017	Neo Jingle Bells	Jazz/Holiday	Low Key Productions
2015	Make It Happen	Jazz	Low Key Productions
