= Teen Dance Ordinance =

1980s Seattle regulation

The Teen Dance Ordinance was a controversial Seattle law which severely curtailed the ability of concert and club promoters to hold events for underaged patrons. The organization Parents in Arms advocated for its creation.

During its existence from 1985 to 2002, it was routinely criticized for its severity (often labeled "draconian") and its effects on the local music scene and industry. After several unsuccessful attempts to repeal it through lobbying and later court action, it was finally repealed and replaced with the All-Ages Dance Ordinance.

== History ==
From 1977 to 1985, teen dances were unregulated in Seattle. Activities at underage clubs were attracting the attention of the public and an LGBTQ community centre called The Monastery was a particular target for anti-LGBTQ rhetoric. The Monastery was run by George Freeman and was affiliated with the Universal Life Church, whose dance events were religious services within the church. During daytime hours it was a youth center that attracted runaways and homeless youth.

The Teen Dance Ordinance (TDO) was conceived and passed the City Council on July 29, 1985, to stop abuses at underage clubs. It was amended in 1988. Key among its provisions were:

- Age limits: Underage dances (allowing those under 18 to attend) may only admit patrons age 15-20 unsupervised. Anyone younger would require a parent or guardian chaperone and anyone older would need to be accompanying a youth under 18.
- Security requirement: Two off-duty police officers were required on premises, with one off-duty officer outside to patrol the area.
- Insurance: $1,000,000 in liability insurance was required;
- Exemptions: Non-profits and schools were exempt from these restrictions.

With these requirements, teen dances outside of schools were virtually banned in the city, as no promoter would undertake the costs involved. For a city the size of Seattle, shows that would only allow 15- to 20-year-olds could not draw a large enough crowd for the event to break even. In addition to the $1 million insurance bond, hiring off-duty officers was a huge expense. The non-profit exemption meant the ordinance did not apply to the Monastery; it was closed using pre-existing civil abatement laws. In the 15 years of the ordinance, almost no one applied for a promoter's license for youth events, and no one has been prosecuted with it.

While the ordinance only regulated "dances," the distinction between a concert and a dance was not outlined by law, and the police were accused of defining a dance so liberally that the dancing done in the audience of a concert was enough to qualify the entire event as a "dance." All-ages concerts were thus subject to being shut down by police who were vigilant in making sure promoters did not skirt the law. As a result, some nationally touring acts refused to do shows in Seattle because they insisted on all-ages audiences. With Seattle becoming an epicenter for alternative rock and the grunge scene in the early 1990s, teens had to go to neighboring cities to attend concerts and dances.

Proponents of the TDO said that the ordinance ensured the safety of underage patrons and discouraged gatherings where youth consumed drugs and alcohol. They also invoked the memory of the Monastery, where they said adults preyed upon vulnerable kids susceptible to offers of drugs or quick cash. Excluding adults from underage youth would, in their eyes, create a "bubble of safety."

The repeal of the ordinance was a key goal of JAMPAC, a musicians' and promoters' political action committee founded by Krist Novoselic of Nirvana. Since its founding in 1995, the group lobbied the City Council to repeal the TDO.

The ordinance was a focal point for a vocal young activist community in Seattle, notably those consolidated as The All Ages Music Organization, and later by the Music and Youth Task Force, which allowed for youth and public officials to meet regularly to find resolution to conflicting points of view.

A new ordinance proposed to replace the TDO was passed by the City Council in 2000, however it was quickly vetoed by Mayor Paul Schell. The veto caused JAMPAC to launch a suit against the City of Seattle, claiming that the TDO's virtual outlawing of dance infringed on the First Amendment right to free expression. A judge however ruled for the City on JAMPAC's suit in May 2002, claiming there was no infringement on the First Amendment and that the matter is a political one for the council to decide, not the courts. Nevertheless, during the course of the suit, Schell was voted out of office (in the aftermath of the disastrous WTO meetings of 1999) and the new mayor Greg Nickels, a proponent of the bill, resubmitted the ordinance to the council. The new All-ages Dance Ordinance, written by members of the Music and Youth Task Force, was passed on August 12, 2002, replacing the TDO.

== All-Ages Dance Ordinance ==
The provisions of the All-Ages Dance Ordinance (AADO) eased restrictions to accommodate new youth events. They include:

- a definition of a dance as an event where dancing is the primary activity intended
- allowing all-ages events to occur if alcohol will not be served
- requiring only the requesting of off-duty officers at an event, to be granted by the Seattle Police Guild
- elimination of the $1 million insurance requirement

The new rules, while more liberal than before, still disappointed many activists who pushed for the TDO's repeal. They viewed the new ordinance as only moderate changes to the rules and not liberal enough to actually encourage all ages shows. Proponents of the TDO also criticize the new AADO, saying the new all-ages events are now ignored by the police, and that the new law is confusing and ignored by unlicensed promoters. Raves have also been points of criticism; they have now been classified as concerts and are outside the scope of the ordinance while frequent use of MDMA by attendees have been reported.

In March 2006, in the aftermath of the Capitol Hill massacre where a gunman shot several partygoers after a rave, The Seattle Times editorialized against the new dance rules and called for the city's all-ages dance rules to be "thoroughly re-examined and re-tooled." Local community leaders however have so far ignored such pleas, noting that the incident was the work of a deranged gunman whose intent to kill could not be stopped with new city laws.

== See also ==
- Nightlife legislation of the United States
