= George McGrath (footballer) =

Australian rules footballer

Personal information
- Full name: George McGrath
- Born: 16 November 1935
- Original team: Warrnambool
- Height: 184 cm (6 ft 0 in)
- Weight: 92 kg (203 lb)
- Position: Halfback

Playing career^{1}
Years	Club	Games (Goals)
1956, 1958–62	Geelong	71 (0)
- ^{1} Playing statistics correct to the end of 1962.

George McGrath (born 16 November 1935) is a former Australian rules footballer who played with Geelong in the Victorian Football League (VFL).
