= George Bakan =

American activist (1941–2020)

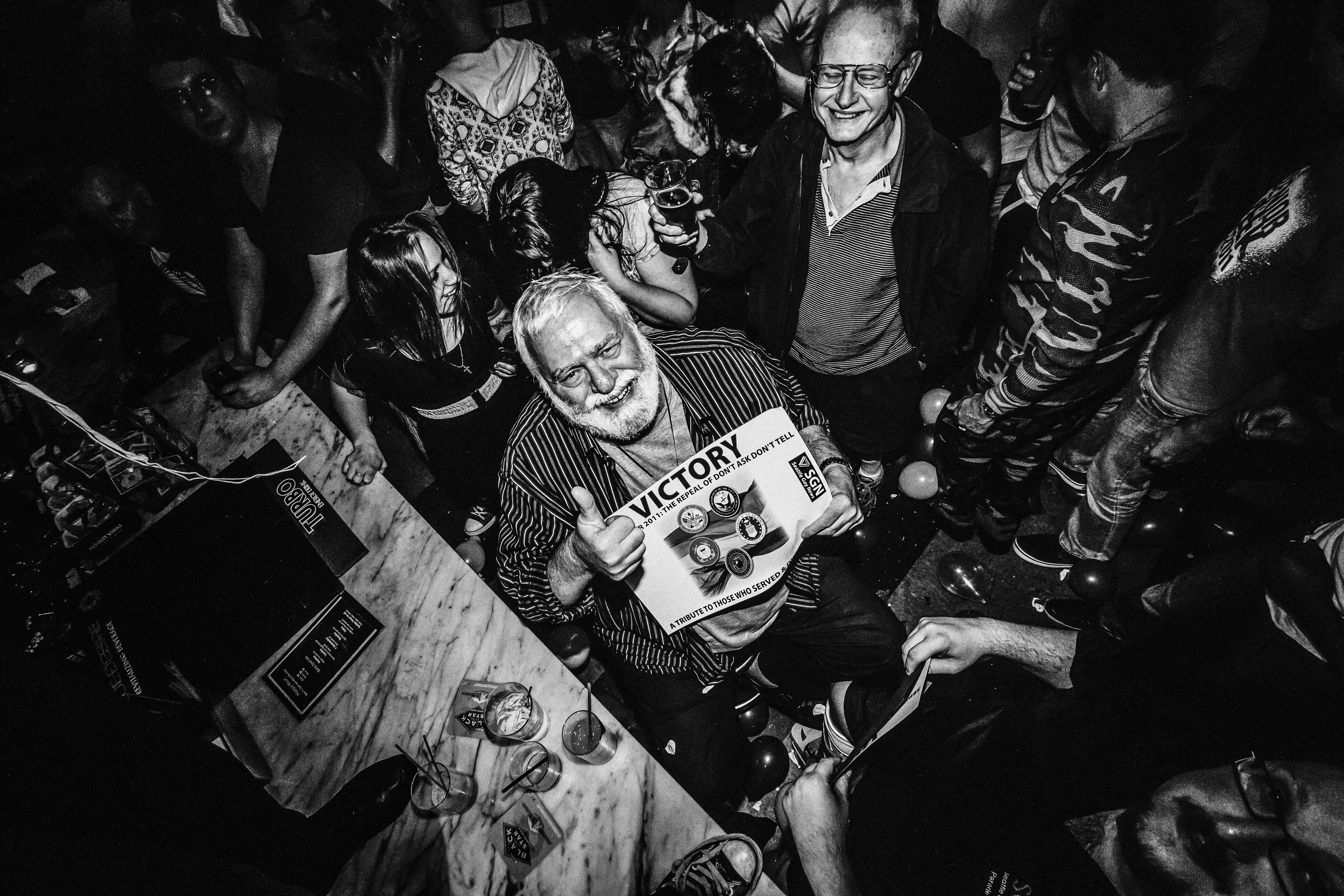
- Born: Rudolph George Bakan; October 3, 1941; Seattle, Washington
- Died: June 7, 2020 (aged 78); Seattle, Washington
- Occupations: Activist, Editor
- Known for: LGBT activism
- Honours: George Bakan Day

George Bakan was an American organizer for LGBT movements and the editor-in-chief of Seattle Gay News. He died in 2020 at age 78.

== Early life ==
Rudolph George Bakan was born in Seattle, Washington. He grew up in rural Bellevue, then moved with his family to Pasco, Washington around 1960. He attended Columbia Basin College in fall 1960 where he was president of the Columbia Basin Young Democrats.

== Seattle Gay News ==
Bakan was the editor of Seattle Gay News from 1983 until his death in 2020.

== Activism ==
Speaking of Bakan's death, former Seattle City Council member Tom Rasmussen said that Bakan may have been Seattle's most influential advocate for LGBT rights. noted Bakan's activities in favor of women’s rights, addressing Homelessness, and Prisoners' rights.

Bakan was an organizer of Seattle Pride, an HIV/AIDS activist, and an advocate for LGBT retirement home availability. He was a regional coordinator for the 1987 Second National March on Washington for Lesbian and Gay Rights and the 1993 March on Washington for Lesbian, Gay and Bi Equal Rights and Liberation.

With Marsha C. Botzer of the Ingersoll Gender Center, Bakan was an advocate for including bisexual and transgender people in LGBT activism, during the time when it was not certain that everyone would do activism together.

In 2013 Neighbors bar held a party in honor of Bakan's activism.

== Death ==
Bakan died at his desk surrounded by Seattle Gay News issues.

Bakan had arranged that his daughter Angela Cragin take over role as owner and publisher of Seattle Gay News, which she did.

At his memorial Seattle Mayor Jenny Durkan described him a legendary gay activist in Seattle. The city dedicated November 13, 2021 as "George Bakan Day".

== Further consideration ==
- Legacy project video series
  - Bakan, George (March 27, 2020). "George Bakan: Being Young and Gay in Seattle" (video). Legacy Project.
  - Bakan, George (March 27, 2020). "George Bakan: Seattle History" (video). Legacy Project.
- Raketty, Renee (June 25, 2021). "George Bakan: A giant who used the SGN to make Queer history". Seattle Gay News.
