= Teenage rebellion =

Developmental process for adolescents to become independent

Teenage rebellion is a part of social development in adolescents in order for them to develop an identity independent from their parents or family and a capacity for independent decision-making. Teenage rebellion usually begins at around 13 years old, while for some it may start to happen 1–2 years before puberty. It then ends at around 18–24 years old. They may experiment with different roles, behaviors, and ideologies as part of this process of developing an identity. Teenage rebellion has been recognized within psychology as a set of behavioral traits that supersede class, culture, or race; some psychologists, however, have disputed the universality of the phenomenon.

According to the terror management theory, the child's allegiance to parental authority and worldviews can weaken after the discovery that parents, like themselves and everyone else, are mortal. This realization creates an unconscious need for security that is broader than what the parents alone provide. This can lead to new cultural allegiances, in the search for a more enduring sense of meaning. Teenagers seek to perceive themselves a valued contributor to aspects of culture that more convincingly outlive or transcend the mortal individual's lifespan. However, since the parents also instill their cultural beliefs onto the child, if the child does not come to associate their parents' mortality with their cultural beliefs, the chances of rebellion decrease.

== Nature ==
There remains some debate as to whether the causes of teenage rebellion are completely natural or necessary. Some posit that an adolescent's failure to achieve a sense of identity can result in role confusion and an inability to choose a vocation, and/or that these pressures may develop from being viewed as adults. Indeed, in the Western world the age at which one is considered an adult (in both the cultural and legal sense) has advanced from the early teens in earlier centuries to the late teens – or even, in today's society, one's early twenties. However, simply focusing on contemporary western or western-influenced cultures cannot answer the question of "universality". For example, if our hunter–gatherer ancestors or historic agrarian cultures had different patterns of behaviour, this would suggest that "teenage rebellion" is not "completely natural".

In Scientific American, however, Harvard psychologist Robert Epstein disparaged the notion of "the immature brain that supposedly causes teen problems" as largely a myth, and wrote that the turbulence often seen as typical of these years is not "a universal developmental phenomenon." Epstein alternatively contends that external factors – notably "treating older and older people as children while also isolating them from adults and passing laws to restrict their behavior" – are more likely responsible for the angst seen among many American teens. Likewise, in an article by Robin Lustig of BBC, academic Cynthia Lightfoot states that what is now considered youth culture was created by the advent of compulsory formal education in the United States, due to the unprecedented separation of younger and older people that resulted from it. Lustig notes that the efflorescence of rebellious attitudes in teenagers of other countries has been concurrent with the introduction of Western culture into those countries.

== Rebellion against peer norms ==
While teenage rebellion can involve a violation of the law or other rules, it can be limited to a violation of societal norms, including those established by teenagers themselves. According to Rebecca Schraffenberger, her peers saw her bookishness and shyness "as vulnerability and ... made a game of preying upon it. I wasted a couple of years trying to conform and fit in, to wear the clothes from Benetton and buy the ultra-trendy Guess jeans. By the time I was fifteen, I gave up." Thus, Schraffenberger abandoned societal norms for an alternative minority goth culture. Much of goth culture defies majority teenage norms by its interest in subjects such as death, dark music, depression, and emotional demonstration.

== The socio-emotional network ==
Temple University psychologist Laurence Steinberg suggests that "stopping systems within the brain make adolescents more susceptible to engaging in risky or dangerous behavior." Steinberg states that "research does not support the stereotype of adolescents as irrational individuals who believe they are invulnerable and who are unaware, inattentive to, or unconcerned about the potential harms of risky behavior." He argues that risk-taking declines between adolescence and adulthood, because of the maturation of the cognitive control system, which strengthens the ability to inhibit impulsive behavior. Teenage risk-taking is the product of an interaction between the socio-emotional and cognitive control networks, and adolescence is a period in which the former becomes more assertive at puberty while the latter gains strength over a longer period of time. However, much of the time this network is not highly active. So when the socio-emotional network is not highly activated (for example, when individuals are not emotionally excited or are alone), the cognitive control network is strong enough to impose regulatory control over impulsive and risky behavior. In the presence of peers or under conditions of emotional arousal, however, the socio-emotional network becomes sufficiently activated to diminish the regulatory effectiveness of the cognitive control network. During adolescence, the cognitive control network matures, so that by adulthood, even under conditions of heightened arousal in the socio-emotional network inclinations toward risk-taking can be modulated.

A Cornell study from 2006 determined that teens are more likely to consider risk while making a decision, and for a longer period of time, than adults. They are more likely to overestimate the risks, in fact. Teens will also take risks because they find the reward, such as instant gratification or peer acceptance, more valuable. To further this theory, Cowan determined that future college attendees' academic aptitude and the reality of their realization of their actual college experience are negatively correlated. Many teenagers often have idealized and exaggerated expectations about their college experience, expecting it to be an unending period of happiness, excitement, and fulfillment. Therefore taking risk when valuing things such as popular media and peer acceptance. Casey, speaks on the imbalance between the socioemotional and limbic systems during adolescence, relative to childhood and adulthood. According to Casey teenagers commit suboptimal choices and actions due to their inability, or lack thereof, to consider, "nonlinear changes." This being due to the delayed development of the cognitive control system (Prefrontal Cortex) means that teenagers may struggle to weigh the potential consequences of their actions fully. This is theorized to be because of the quicker development of the limbic system, which plays vital roles in emotions, memories and arousal. Thus influencing individuals of this age to act on emotions rather than critical thinking.

== Popular culture ==
The phenomenon has been categorized by mainstream media and popular culture, and is a very common subject in music and film. Popular culture allows large diverse groups of people to identify indiscriminately and to feel represented. Not only does it serve as a way of inclusion in society as it joins the masses on standards of acceptable forms of behavior but it also forges a sense of identity, meaning and purpose that chains the individuals of a society. Many historians have analyzed the way that film influenced the teenage generation and culture. Thomas Doherty stated that film was one of the first forms of media to evolve from mass culture to teen culture, and that thanks to film the teen idol fever started. An example of films that projected images of youth is Rebel Without a Cause, which was extremely influential at the time and created a new idea of young people. The film reflects juvenile delinquency along with confusion, uncertainty and fright of both teenagers and adults. Likewise, Blackboard Jungle is a film that focuses on juvenile delinquency and explains the reasons why teenagers behave the way they do, as well as the pedagogical issues that attack educators and students in a very fragile education system. Apart from the film industry, The Beatles influenced enormously in a social and cultural change. The band developed both personal freedom expressed by physical appearance and experimentation with drugs, which induced introspective and passive behavior, as opposed to alcohol. Their music challenged the generations of outdated parents and favored fun and adventure among teenagers. The Beatles became a liberating force for millions of teenagers who would then become activists, hippies and protests of social and cultural change. Many psychologists saw Beatlemania as a rebellion and a reaction against their conservative elders. Another example in music was "Rock Around the Clock", which not only was one of the first American rock n’ roll recordings but also it was considered the teenage National Anthem. Considering the film and music industries, the specialist John Storey defines popular culture as something that arises from the people rather than imposed upon them. In other words, popular culture is shaped and designed by its consumers and that is why it is, without exception, intervened with teenage rebellion.

== Historical background ==
The word "teenager" (also spelled "teen ager" or "teen-ager") emerged in 1922 as a noun derived from the adjective "teenage." Earlier terms include "teener," recorded in American English from 1894, and the noun "teen" meaning a teen-aged person, which dates back to 1818 but remained uncommon until the 20th century. Even though a lot of publications of the 1950s sought to explain this adolescence change, it was not until the twentieth century that historians began to analyze this phenomenon. The study of teenage rebellion has no definitive categories since scholars have given a multitude of causes for this behavioral evolution in society. Theodore Roszak was one of the first historians to analyze the teenage rebellion from the 1950s. According to Roszak, this individual movement could be compared to the Romantic Movement or even the Renaissance as people during those time periods struggled for independence the same way the youth of his society did. In his book The Making of a Counter Culture, Roszak stated that teenage rebellion at the time was actually nothing more than a phase that each society goes through periodically. In other words, this longing for identity teenagers experience can be explained by being a part of a society. William O'Neill theorized that Americans in the 1950s were so deeply affected by events such as World War II and the Cold War that the youth of the time were simply neglected and this led them to rebel. James Gilbert agreed with O'Neill that the people who grew up during World War II were particularly affected and influenced from being raised by a war generation. Gilbert also added that the media contributed to this phenomenon by celebrating teenage delinquency with movies, music, and magazines. It is difficult to determine the extent to which mass media played a role in inspiring some bouts of juvenile delinquency in the suburbs. W.T. Lhamon discusses how the power of the teenage culture was not at first evident to those who capitalized on it. Eventually, society realized that changes in manners, values, and styles were not simply a trend but a growing expression of teenage rebellion against what teens viewed as conservative ideals they disagreed with. According to Lhamon, the youth culture was and still is something that has greater control in society than many realize. Numerous historians have attributed the source of the American teenage rebellion to many different factors throughout the years, such as the economic expansion, the wartime effects, media consumption, and the United States becoming increasingly conformist, politically conservative, and intolerant.

== See also ==
- Generation gap
- Family honor
- Transgenerational trauma
- Positive adult development
