= Universal Life Church Monastery =

Multi-religious interfaith ministry

Coordinates: 47°34′44.79″N 122°20′10.26″W

- Classification: Non-denominational
- Brother: George Freeman
- Region: Worldwide
- Headquarters: Seattle, Washington
- Origin: 1977
- Separated from: Universal Life Church
- Ministers: 20 million (2011)
- Official website: themonastery.org

The Universal Life Church Monastery (ULCM) is a multi-religious interfaith ministry that has an online ordination program, which allows individuals to preside over weddings, baptisms, and funerals in the United States depending on state and county laws. George Freeman is president of the Seattle, Washington–based ministry. It claims to have ordained 20 million ministers.

== History ==
The Universal Life Church Monastery was founded in 1977 as an offshoot of the Universal Life Church. The church first established a website that allowed individuals to apply for ordination in 1995. Universal Life Church Monastery formally split from the Modesto-based Universal Life Church in 2006 following financial and legal disputes between the two bodies. Universal Life Church Monastery then began ordaining ministers through its own website.

== Beliefs ==
Universal Life Church Monastery's mantra is "We are all children of the same universe." It also has two core tenets:

- Do only that which is right.
- Every individual is free to practice their religion in the manner of their choosing, as mandated by the First Amendment, so long as that expression does not impinge upon the rights or freedoms of others and is in accordance with the government's laws.

The monastery's stated mission is to ordain anyone regardless of their spiritual or religious denomination. As of 2019, the church had stated that it is almost finished renovating a physical building to serve as a house of worship, and conducts ordination through its website. According to the church, ordination allows its ministers to perform marriages, funerals, baptisms, and exorcisms. It provides ordination services free of charge.

== See also ==
- Universal Life Church
- List of ministers of the Universal Life Church
