= George F. McGrath =

George F. McGrath (died 1988) was a United States police commissioner.

John Lindsay, the Mayor of New York City, appointed McGrath as the New York City Commissioner of Correction in 1966. McGrath was formerly Commissioner of Correction in Massachusetts from 1959 - 1965.

In 1970 McGrath oversaw various inmate protests at the Manhattan Central Detention Complex. Ed Koch surveyed the inmates and reported their claims that guards at the prison frequently assaulted them. McGrath was among the leadership who responded to the Attica Prison riot.

In 1971 McGrath quit his post at the jail.

McGrath died in 1988.
