= Seattle Gay News =

LGBTQ newspaper in Seattle, Washington, U.S.

Seattle Gay News (SGN)
- Type: Weekly newspaper
- Format: Tabloid
- Owners: JT&A (former); James Arnold (former); George Bakan (former); Angela Cragin (2020-2023); Mike Schultz (2023-2024); Renee Raketty (2024–present)
- Publisher: James Arnold (former)
- Editor: Jim Tully (1974-1984); George Bakan (1984-2020); A.V. Eichenbaum (2021-2023); Benny Loy (2023–present)
- Founded: 1974
- Headquarters: Seattle, Washington, US
- Website: www.sgn.org
- Free online archives: issuu.com/sgn.org

The Seattle Gay News is a weekly newspaper aimed at the Seattle and Puget Sound area LGBT community in the U.S. state of Washington. As of 2023, the SGN is distributed to every library in the King County Library System, Seattle Public Library System, and Pierce County Library System, as well as roughly 115 other locations in Seattle, Tacoma, Bellingham, Spokane and Ocean Shores.

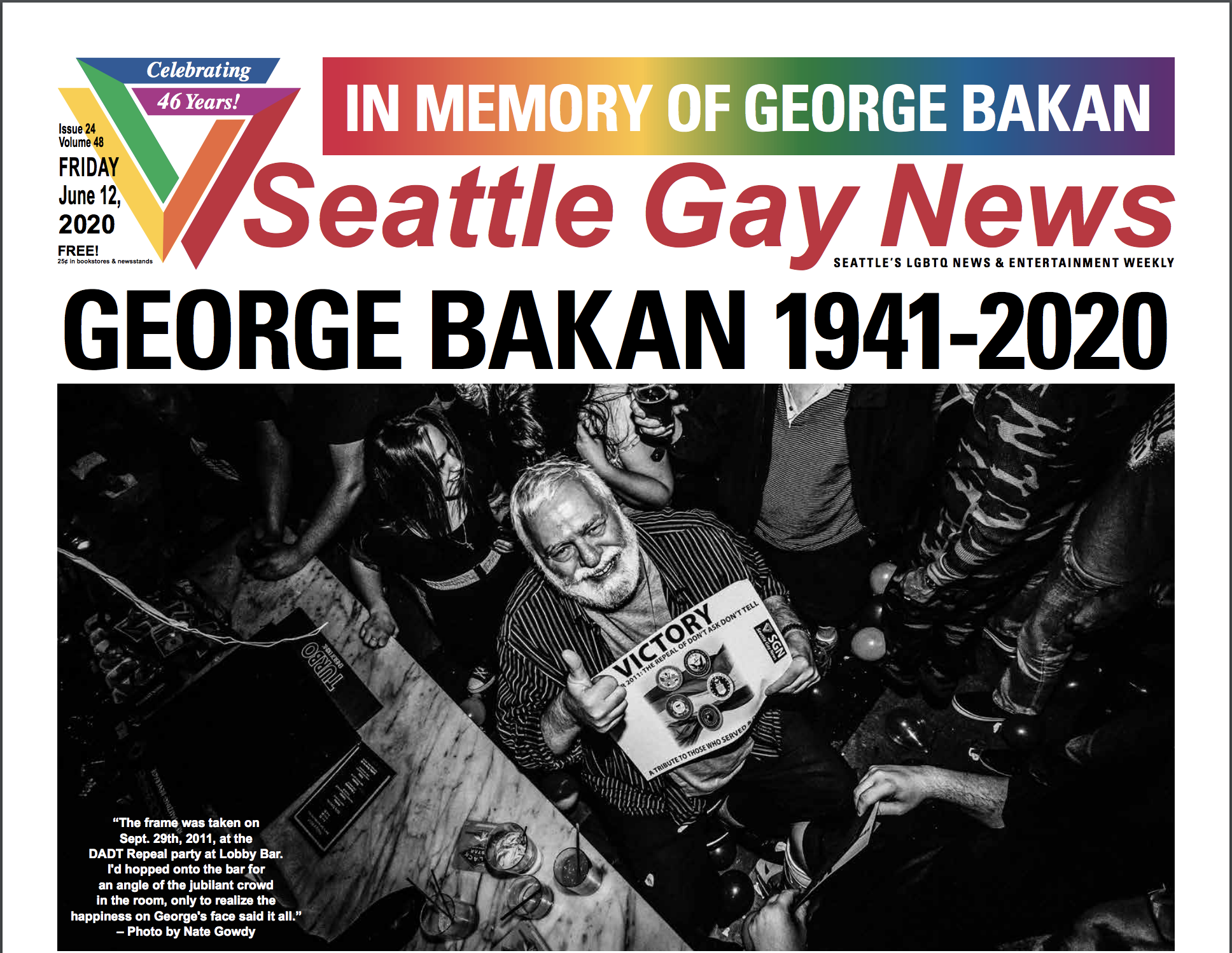
Former editor George Bakan celebrated the adoption of the Don't Ask, Don't Tell Repeal Act of 2010

== History ==
The newspaper was founded in 1974 by Jim Tully and Jim Arnold. Editor George Bakan, an LGBTQ+ activist in Seattle, acted as head of the SGN from 1984 until his death from a sudden heart attack in 2020. His daughter Angela Cragin then took over his role at the paper.

In 2021, staff began restructuring the paper to improve its diversity and inclusivity. In the same year, SGN launched a podcast as part of the restructuring effort.

In 2023, Cragin sold the publication to Stratus Group LLC, owned by Mike Schultz. A year later Schultz sold SGN to Prism Pride Press, owned by Renee Raketty.

== Archive ==
SGN files are preserved in the Washington State History Museum in Tacoma. The SGN is archived at Yale University (Beinecke Rare Book & Manuscript Library), University of Washington (Suzzallo Library) in Seattle, the Seattle Public Library (Central Library) and the Stonewall National Museum, Archive and Library in Fort Lauderdale, Florida. Microfiche copies of the archives can be found at UW and the Seattle Public Library.

The Washington State Library in partnership with the Suzzallo Library and the SGN digitized the SGN's archive from 1974 through 2020 (although only in black & white). Additionally, every issue of the SGN was scanned in full color and uploaded to Issuu.

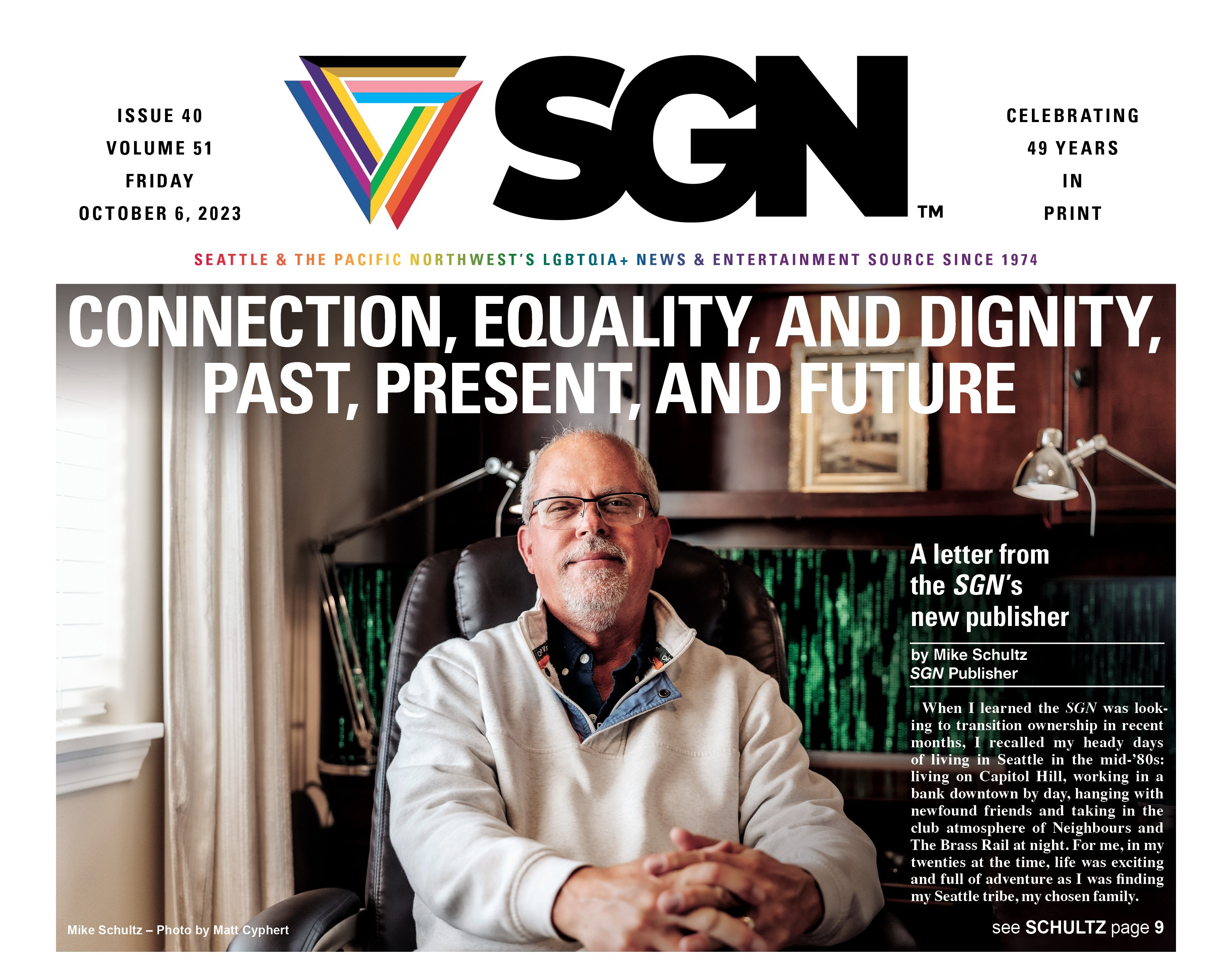
In the October 6, 2023, issue of the SGN new owner and publisher Mike Schultz discusses his history with the SGN and his vision for its future.
