= Marcus Johnson (jazz musician) =

American musician, music publisher (born 1971)

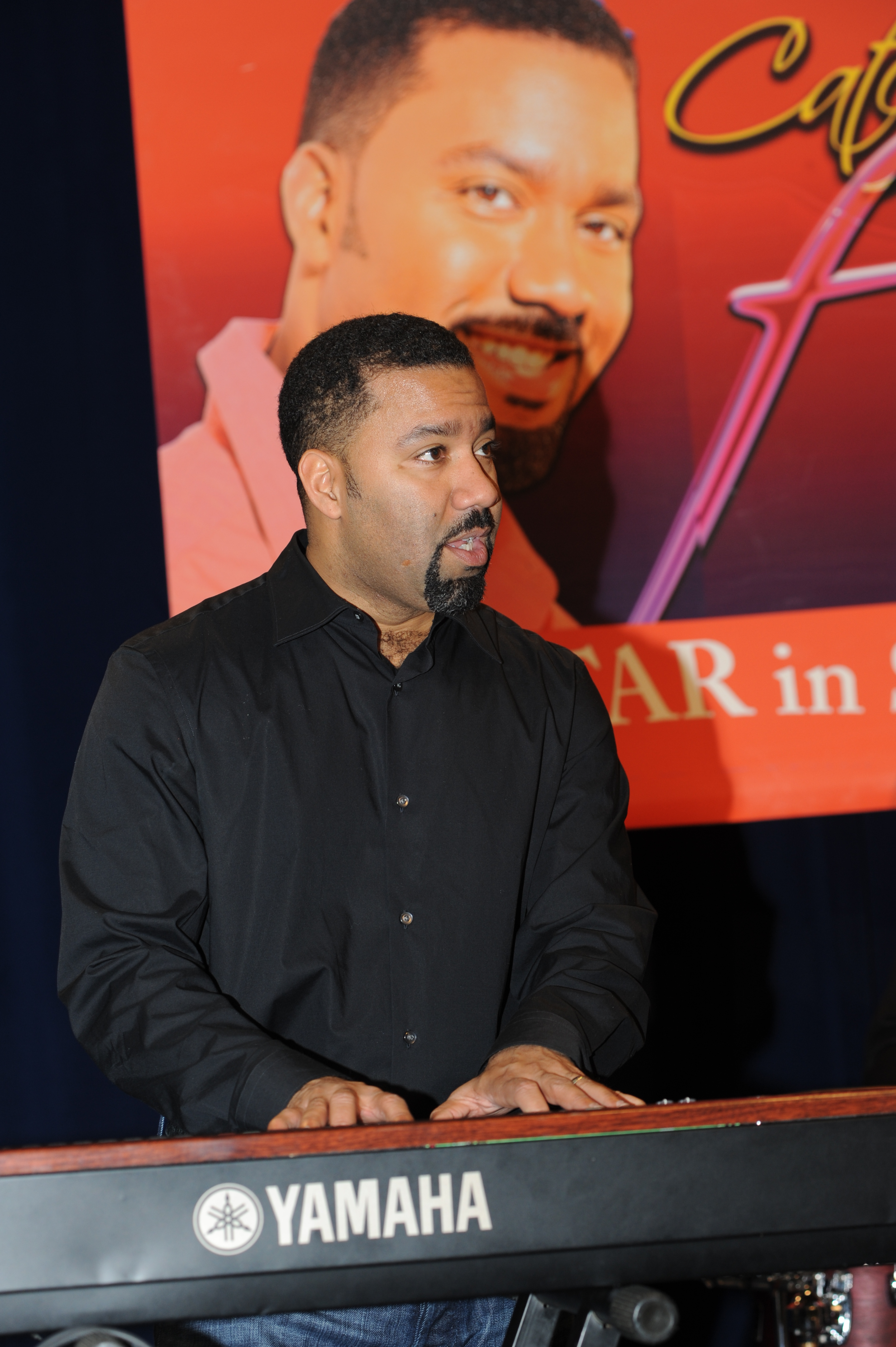
- Johnson in 2008
- Born: 1971 (age 53–54); Columbus, Ohio, U.S.
- Education: Montgomery Blair High School; University of Miami; Howard University (BA); Georgetown University (MBA, JD)
- Occupations: Jazz musician; producer; entrepreneur
- Children: 1

Marcus Johnson (born 1971) is an American jazz musician, producer and entrepreneur.

== Early life ==
Marcus Johnson was born in Columbus, Ohio. When he was 10 years old, he established a neighborhood lawn care service. He and his family moved to Washington, D.C. when he was 12 years old. As a teenager, he started an auto-detailing company and played in a jazz band at Montgomery Blair High School. Subsequently, Johnson studied music production at the University of Miami. Johnson earned a bachelor of arts degree in music at Howard University, where he was a member of Alpha Phi Alpha fraternity. At Georgetown University, he earned both M.B.A. and J.D. degrees.

Johnson grew up listening to a wide variety of music, but found his calling in jazz, where he incorporates the rhythms of rap with R&B. His interest in jazz became apparent when he began playing piano at the age of 13. Johnson's step-father purchased his first keyboard after winning Maryland's Pick 3 Lottery. Johnson was inspired to learn traditional and contemporary jazz music by observing other musicians, including musicians Joe Sample and Thelonious Monk.

== Musical career ==
=== Musician ===
Johnson independently released his first jazz album, Lessons in Love, while studying at Georgetown University. In 1997, he released a second independent jazz album, Inter Alia. His listener base attracted the attention of N2K Encoded Music, now known as N-Coded Music. He signed with the label and subsequently released the album Chocolate City Groovin' (1998).

=== Music publishing ===
Also while studying at Georgetown, Johnson established Marimelj Entertainment Group, Inc., a production company and music publishing firm. The mixture of contemporary jazz, alternative, and R&B creates what the company calls “the Urban Groove”. Johnson's success with his albums caught the attention of Black Entertainment Television (BET) founder and businessman Robert L. Johnson, who invested in Marimelj. Under their partnership, Marimelj's label, Three Keys Music, established its own full service recording studio, Studio 8121; and two music publishing companies, Marimelj Music Publishing and Three Keys Music Publishing.

Three Keys is an independent music publishing company Johnson created. It was started as a local record label. The record label also features and produced music for national jazz artists: Michael Lington, Jaared Arosemena, Bobby Lyle, Nick Colionne, R&B singer Alyson Williams, neo-soul singer Zahzarah; and smooth jazz saxophonists Phillip Martin and Brian Lenair.

To date, Johnson has released more than fifteen Billboard-charted CDs.

== Personal life ==
Johnson resides in Maryland. He has a daughter.

== Awards ==
Johnson was nominated for an NAACP Image Award in 2010.

He was also nominated for Best Urban Contemporary Instrumentalist in the Washington Area Music Association's WAMMIES in 2013.

Johnson was awarded the Samuel A. Halsey Award from his alma mater, Georgetown University, on January 17, 2015.

== Discography ==
- Lessons in Love (1997)
- Inter Alia (1997; re-released in 2000)
- Chocolate City Groovin' (1998)
- Urban Groove (2000)
- Comin' Back Around (2001)
- In Person - Live at Blues Alley (2002)
- Just Doing What I Do (2004)
- Smooth Jazz Christmas (2005)
- Phoenix (2007)
- In Concert for a Cause (2008)
- Flo: Chill (2008)
- Flo: Romance (2008)
- Flo: Standards (2008)
- Poetically Justified (2009)
- This Is How I Rock (2010)
- Flo Chill, Vol. 2: Juris (2010)
- Flo (For The Love Of) Holiday (2011)
