= Membership organization =

Organization to which members subscribe

A membership organization is any organization that allows people or entities to subscribe, and often requires them to pay a membership fee or subscription fee. Membership organizations typically connect people around a particular activity, geographical location, industry, activity, interest, mission, or profession. This might simply be to encourage or facilitate interaction and collaboration, but it also often involves promoting and enhancing the purpose itself.

Membership organizations are often not for profit, but there are also many commercially-run membership organizations, and some larger not for profit membership organizations (like the National Trust in the United Kingdom) which have commercial subsidiaries. They vary in size from very small voluntary associations, which may not be formally established, to very large nationally or internationally renowned organizations, like the aforementioned National Trust, which had 3.7 million members in 2010, each paying about £50 per year. Some of these membership organizations are referred to as multi-chapters if they have a main parent organization that is made up of chapters, clubs, or regions.

Types of membership organization include professional associations, trade associations, voluntary associations, political parties, clubs, and a wide range of others. Membership organizations may rely on membership software to provide services to their members through the Internet.
