= Youth homelessness =

Social issue of Homelessness of the Youth

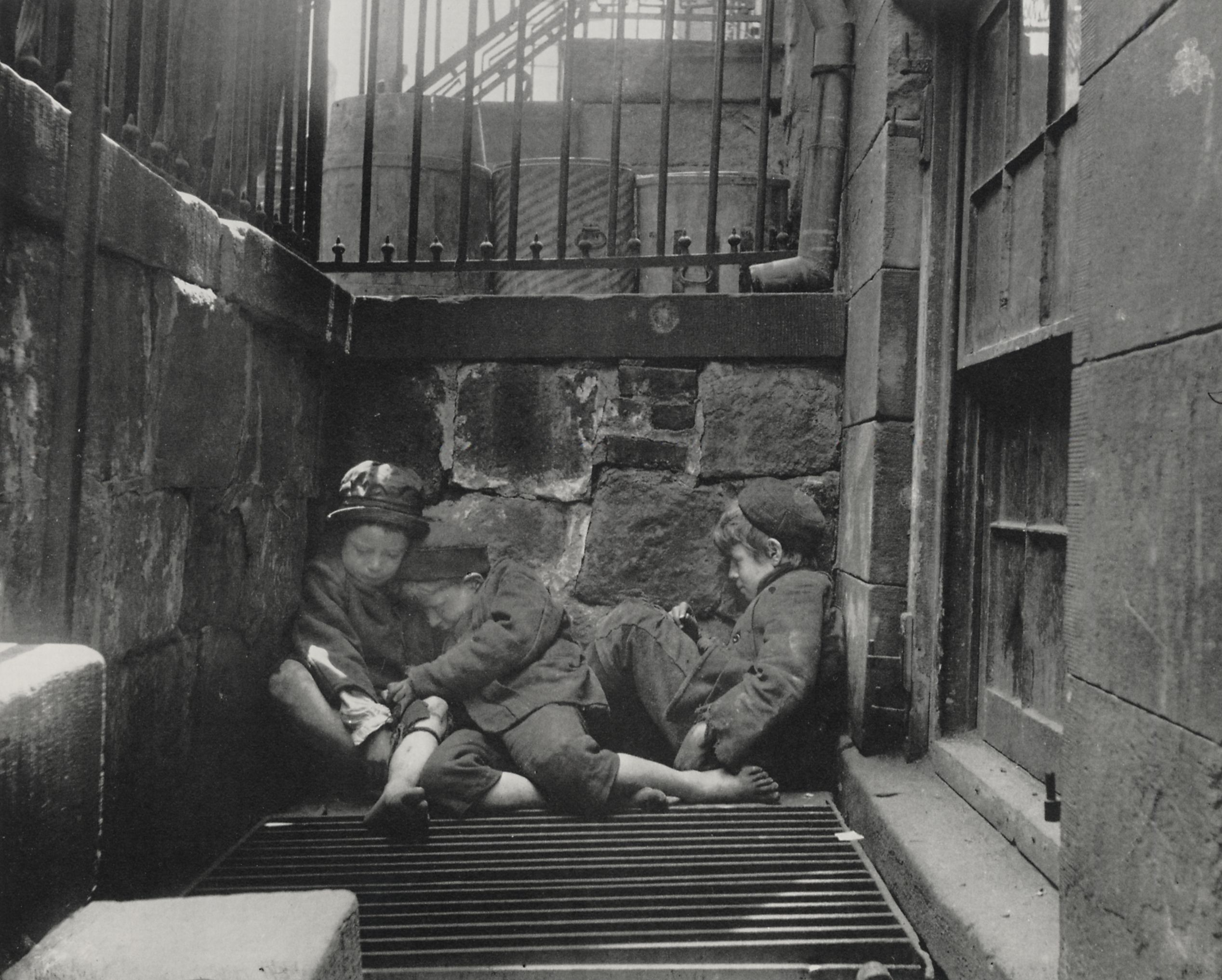
Homeless children sleeping in New York City, 1890. Photographed by Jacob Riis.

Youth homelessness is the problem of homelessness or housing insecurity amongst young people around the globe, extending beyond the absence of physical housing in most definitions and capturing familial instability, poor housing conditions, or future uncertainty (couch surfing, van living, hotels). Youth homelessness affects people globally, transcending borders. Policies to alleviate this challenge have been implemented in nations worldwide, yet the challenge of keeping young people off the streets persists. Foundational struggles involving addiction, familial unrest, or abuse often lead to young people choosing to leave or being forced out of their homes before they are adequately prepared to be on their own.

== Definitions ==
The definition for youth homelessness varies widely across national borders, and many developed nations acknowledge hardship leading up to homelessness in addition to an individual being physically unhoused, capturing a wider swath of the population. The term "Youth" itself is defined by the United Nations as an individual between the ages of ten and twenty-four, and most states' definitions fall near this categorization, yet flex slightly. In the United States, a person deemed to be a member of the "homeless youth" is someone who is under the age of 21. They are also unable to safely live with a relative or any other safe alternative living arrangement. In Australia, there are three categories of homelessness which include those who live from one emergency shelter to another (in homeless shelters or 'couch surfing' at friends' homes), as well as those living in accommodation that falls below minimum community standards (boarding houses and caravan parks). In the European Union, anyone between the ages of 13 and 26 who lacks a physical structure to reside in, or who struggles with housing insecurity as a result of fractured caregiver relations falls into this category of "Youth Homelessness".

Youth homelessness is prevalent both in developing countries and many developed countries. Less developed nations sometimes refer to homeless youth as "street children" which encompasses not only true homelessness, but also street workers who are not homeless but who work in the informal sector. In 1986, UNICEF established two varieties of "Street Children": half of whom return home after their days of work, and those who reside without permanent shelter. There is a challenge to acquiring official data or research on these "street children" given the lack of permanency in their work or housing, all of which goes without the official awareness of the state in which the children reside.

== Targeted challenges for youth populations ==
Criminal, Familial, and Addiction challenges are difficult to separate. In many scenarios where young people voluntarily leave or are forced out of their homes, there is some combination of these three challenges. Substance abuse, sexual or physical abuse, and familial dysfunction are often related.

=== Crime ===
Homeless people, and homeless organizations, are sometimes accused or convicted of fraudulent behavior. Criminals are also known to exploit homeless people, ranging from identity theft to tax and welfare scams. These incidents often lead to negative connotations about homeless youth. There is a cyclical nature to such charges. Once an individual has become homeless, it naturally becomes more challenging to fit within societal norms to gain employment and ultimately become housed again. A homeless youth will be unable to gain the education to prepare or qualify them for future employment. Some programs help individuals facing youth homelessness gain peer support to cultivate rich relationships and mentorships with peers to curb the mental health challenges that come as a bi-product or cause of youth homelessness.

Violence and abuse inflicted on children or young people often leads to youth homelessness. Abusive behaviors inflicted upon young people during their adolescence can encourage them to leave home at an earlier age either by force or by choice. Criminal activities by a young person's parents can set the precedent that such activity is acceptable, driving children to replicate these illegal behaviors. The transition out of juvenile detention centers can also encourage youth to be unhoused. For survival, stealing food or money, or resorting to prostitution can be a tool used by street children or homeless youth as well.

=== Family ===
Across the globe, youth homelessness is bolstered by young people's tendency to leave home as they near adulthood leaving them to support themselves through limited resources. Young people are sometimes forced out of the home as they near adulthood, or leave at will if conditions are not desirable for conditions such as sexual or domestic abuse, divorce or subsequent remarriage. Some nomadic youth, specifically in the United States, who would be technically categorized as homeless or lacking in a permanent home might embrace the freedom to move at will, and call themselves by other names such as "travelers" or "explorers" further complicating the definition and understanding of Youth Homelessness.

Children are naturally disposed to repeat the behaviors of their elders during their formative years, even at the micro-level. This feature of human development becomes dangerous when abuse or mistreatment surrounds children in their household. Over half of homeless youth have experienced abusive caregiving behaviors in some way.

Some children also enter the foster care system during their childhood when conditions of abuse or neglect become extreme, and the state is forced to intervene. Foster Care can cause children/teens to run away if the living conditions or foster family are undesirable to them, and as a result of sometimes frequent changes in their living situations.

=== Substance use ===
Alcohol or drug use can motivate parents to force children out of their homes before they are financially prepared to do so. In Russia, alcohol and drug addiction amongst youth permeates society, and contributes to the number of orphans or unhoused children within the nation. Children whose parents are affected by substance abuse behaviors are more likely to also become affected in later years. Additionally, many children engage with risky sexual behavior under the influence of drugs or alcohol which can result in pregnancy or Sexually Transmitted Diseases (STD's).

=== Mental health ===
Very closely related to the other topics, pre-existing Mental Health conditions (as a direct or indirect result of the previously outlined contributions) can increase Youth Homelessness. In the COVID-19 Pandemic, Canada saw a stark decline in mental health as a result of loneliness. Many young individuals shifted to substances to help curb this loneliness, which further exacerbated the crisis. Breaks in routines which had helped combat addiction, or even changes that caused addiction occurred in the pandemic. Additionally, amongst street children across the world, and particularly in Latin America, children may add to the already negative outlook on their lifestyles as a result of exterior judgment. Negative public and governmental perceptions of these children can make accessing resources to find housing more difficult.

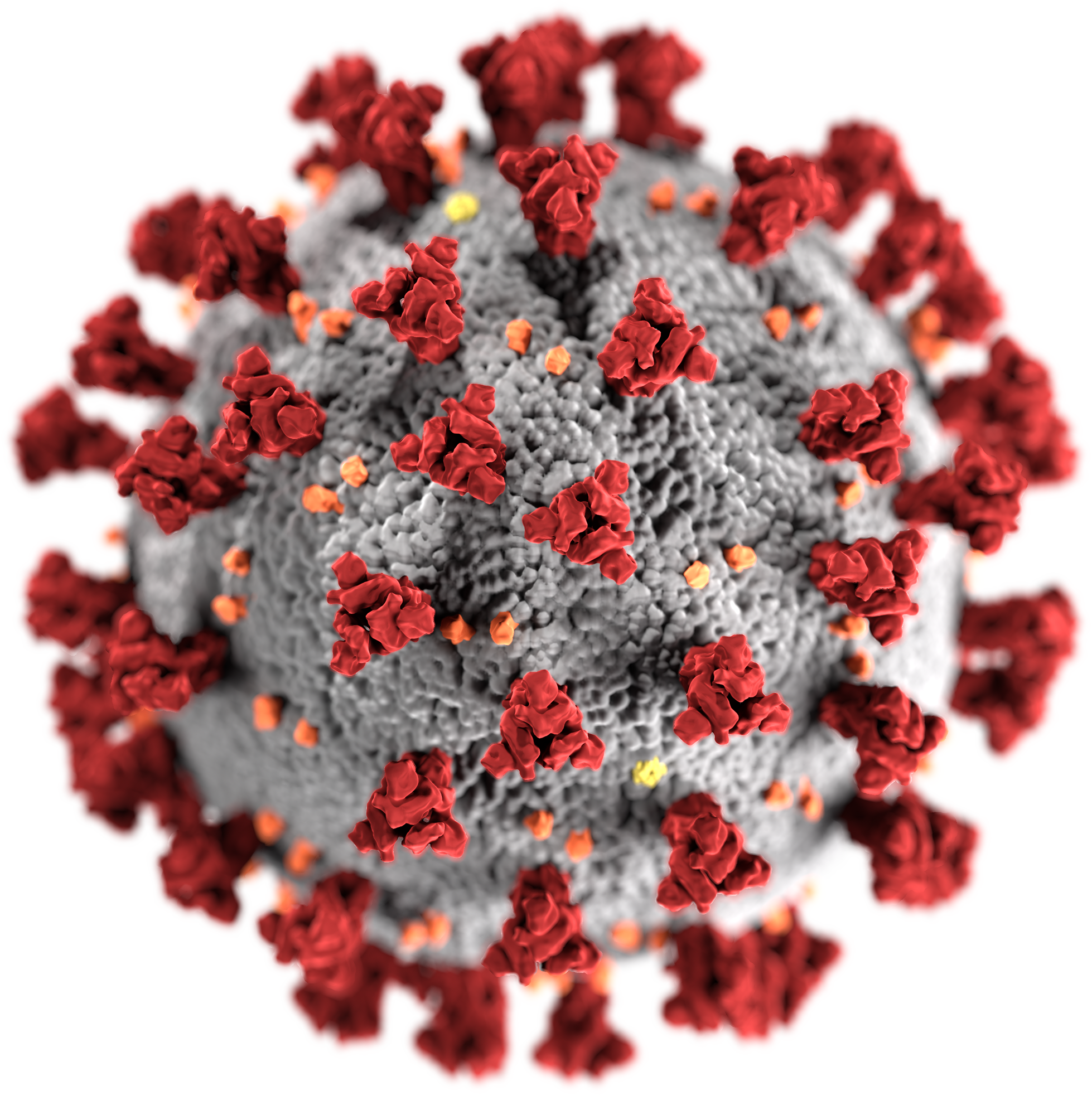
Within COVID-19 outbreak we experienced an extremely low rate of job security resulting in multiple people and families losing their jobs forcing children out of their homes and separated from their families in certain instances.

=== Economics ===
Across the world, income distribution is skewed towards the wealthiest populations. Pre-existing inequalities also exacerbate the already unequal distribution of wealth, making it difficult in many societies for the poor to mobilize and gain access to new employment opportunities. Additionally, there is a substantial barrier in generational economic mobility, particularly in the US, but also in many regions of the world. Children tend to naturally fall into a similar economic range as their parents do as a result of birth age, and educational milestones, however this varies regionally. Racial disparities further diminish economic mobility at a community-level.

== Case studies ==
=== Australia ===
Youth homelessness in Australia is a significant social issue, affecting tens of thousands of young people. In 2006, the Australian government estimated, focusing on homeless school children, found some 20,000 homeless youth between the ages of 12 and 18. Another estimate found approximately 44,000 homeless Australians under the age of 25.

Activists maintain that the majority of young people leave home because of family breakdown, often caused by domestic violence and abuse. Swinburne University researchers found that over $600 million is spent each year on health and justice services for homeless youth.

Researchers have studied the prevalence of psychological distress and mental illness among homeless youth in Australia.

Some experts argue that early intervention services are an effective way to curb youth homelessness. Specifically a study was done in Australia that found a great way to help curb youth homelessness is through mentoring of the youth. Other researchers have examined the potential solution of youth foyers.

=== Canada ===
In Canada, youth homelessness is recognized as a significant social issue, however, no nationwide strategy or study has been conducted. Research has focused on various factors that challenge Canadian youth, leading to homelessness including sexual identification, mental health, and physical health struggles prior to and during periods of homelessness. Under the COVID-19 Pandemic, Canada saw an uptick in Youth Homelessness, and a decline in homeless shelter morale as a result of mental health, economic, and racial challenges in its wake. The challenge of Youth Homelessness in Canada is often overlooked, and the definition of "homeless" is kept far too narrow for many of the Youth members to be encompassed within state assistance programs. Many young people experiencing homelessness expressed irritation with the late intervention rather than with preventative steps prior to the outcome of total homelessness. Additionally, when assistance was requested, many reported denial or barriers that would exacerbate pre-existing mental health challenges and result in self-esteem reduction. A study done to help curb these issues found that it is best to help them while they are in the education pipeline before the problems worsen.

In 2018, a study was conducted to gain a new perspective on youth homelessness, resulting in the development of three avenues of prevention to target all levels of the issue. The three levels of prevention are:

1. Structural prevention — helps alleviate poverty, discrimination, and expands acceptance in societal beliefs.
2. System prevention — education, healthcare, and criminal justice.
3. Individual and Relational causes — family conflict, family crisis and social isolation.

The study concluded that the main issue with policies enabling Youth Homelessness to persist is the late intervention of assistance. Help at the front-end would prevent many cases of homelessness according to testimonials of the homeless youth. In some instances, the systems in place enhanced the issues at hand through isolation with the rejection of LGBTQ+ members from various assistance programs, as well as stigmatization of the overall challenge. Also, a new study by Today Canada is still working on youth homelessness to trials such as housing first to decrease youth homelessness in Canada.

=== United States ===
In the United States an estimated 4.2 million young people experience homelessness during critical stages in their development. American homeless youth are a varied group. Some researchers maintain that around two million young people in America are homeless. According to the National Conference of State Legislatures, roughly 41,000 kids and young adults within the ages of 13-25 experience homelessness every night. Almost all of which have reported suffering from at least one of the following; substance misuse problems, mental health problems, foster care, juvenile jail or detention, and physical harm. Many of these individuals have experienced extreme trauma and despair either before or after becoming homeless.

Looking through a demographic lens, lesbian, gay, bisexual and transgender youth have more than two times the risk of being homeless than heterosexual. This can be a result of family problems along with not being accepted by parents or guardians. Females in particular are more likely to "run away" from home resulting in no shelter. Intergenerational Mobility can also contribute to these housing challenges. In the United States, when compared to other developed nations, most regions experience lower rates of social mobility.

Many actions can be taken to help solve the homeless individuals in the United States. One factor that could make a positive change is re-establishing family relationships. This being the main starting point for homelessness, emphasizing the importance of loved ones can make all the difference. Another more direct action is improving the crisis response regarding these youth and young adults. Whether it's state-related, or even larger organizations, more plans and evaluations need to be made.

=== Russia ===
Russia recognizes the challenge of Youth Homelessness as deeply concerning, partially for the impact that such children will have upon the wider culture, and their inability to assimilate into societal norms. The fall of the Soviet Union and shift away from communism explain the challenge in Russia, specifically. The privatization of many industries and new requirements for individuals to acquire housing and living accommodations without the structure of Soviet era communism left many families and individuals in despair lacking necessities. Some less educated citizens were marginalized during the transition away from communism, causing conditions of poverty, and ultimately familial distress in many situations as a direct result. Additionally, as communism fell, state provided healthcare systems also collapsed. Russian interior minister, Rashid Nurgaliyev, explained that as a result of widespread addiction after the economic and systematic struggles following the Collapse of the Soviet Union, youth homelessness has skyrocketed. He served in this role from 2003 to 2012, seeing the delayed impacts of the Soviet collapse.

=== Latin America ===
Latin American nations have a high population of street children who work in the informal sector or reside on the streets. Political unrest throughout many Latin American nation's recent history has caused a youth homelessness crisis. Often referred to as "street children" in this region, those who are either working on the streets or living on the streets without any family support are exposed to many physical and emotional dangers. Many street children engage in risky sexual behaviors for either pleasure or survival, resulting in early pregnancy amongst many young girls, and the transmission of Sexually Transmitted Diseases. In a study based out of Belo Horizonte, Brazil, the average age for these children's first sexual encounter was 10.8 years for boys, and 12.4 years for girls. The use of drugs is far more prevalent among the street youth population than among children living at home. Brazil experiences the highest known rate of street children across Latin America, however the exact numbers are ambiguous.

=== Nepal ===
Villagers in rural regions of Nepal face physical challenges that can create stress for young people in this region. High levels of maternal mortality and early adult death in the rural regions of the nation also enhance the challenges of youth populations resulting in higher levels of adoption, and general psychological hardships. In the case of Nepal, impoverished children living in rural regions with family support experience different challenges from urban street children who lack family support, yet both have uniquely challenging circumstances. When measurements were taken in a study comparing the cortisol and health levels of boys residing and working in rural villages with homeless street children, it was found that while the two ranked lower than school attending counterparts, children living in rural villages fared worse than the homeless street youth. The study intends to convey that there are various factors in play in childhood psychological and physical distress which shape future characteristics and choices in their adult lives. Despite Governmental action constitutionally embedding the "Right to Housing Act of 2018" declaring that all citizens (including the homeless) have a right to housing within Nepal, the challenge of Homelessness persists, and even when housing is secured, it is often lacking in sanitation measures. Amnesty International has called upon the human rights infringements in the wake of this ratification, noting that it is a duty of the state to uphold its constitutional provisions to their citizens.

== Vulnerable populations and enhanced risk ==
Various factors can exacerbate this housing struggle for young people including sexual identification, socioeconomic discrepancies, and the COVID-19 pandemic.

=== LGBTQ+ populations ===
Some young people who identify as LGBTQ+ are forcibly removed from their homes or sustain scarred relationships with their parents. One homeless young person discussed challenges that arise also from Foster Parents who might have opposing perspectives on sexuality. Young people may choose to leave home if their family does not support their identity, which has become more widely accepted in society, encouraging young people to come out in earlier years than has historically been the norm. Youth Homelessness impacts individuals identifying as LGBTQ+ to a greater extent than other populations of young people, as a direct or indirect result of this. Additionally, these individuals may feel excluded from their community or society at large leading to threats to their physical safety and their mental health which can promote alcohol or drug addiction. The United Nations recognizes these challenges, and examines statistics across a variety of nations yielding the same experiences where young LGBTQ+ populations are at much higher risk of homelessness. In Canada, in a qualitative study conducted with members of their homeless youth population, claims were made of denial of services or exclusion from shelter programs due to their identification as LGBTQ+.

=== COVID-19 pandemic ===
The COVID-19 pandemic caused economic hardships for much of the world's population and particularly impacted already marginalized populations including ethnic minority groups, or individuals who identify as LGBTQ+. Mental health impacts were profound in the United States specifically during the pandemic. Individuals who struggled with mental health disorders previously, or were of a minority ethnic population had more reported mental health struggles than other populations. The uncertainty of employment further exacerbated these challenges, and created a new wave of housing insecurity. In Toronto, during the onset of the Pandemic, homeless shelters and facilities were relocated to hotel rooms to accommodate necessary precautions, and prevent the spread within the homeless shelters. Despite the swift movement to hotel rooms, programs and assistance that were regularly provided had been halted, and more rules were implemented to help curb the spread of the virus. Jobs that are regularly granted to young people with lower experience levels were largely unavailable as the service industry virtually closed during the early months of the Pandemic, reducing the ability for this population to ensure a steady income to pay housing fees.

=== Intersectional identity ===
In addition to challenges related to sexuality or gender identity, Black, Indigenous, and youth of color are disproportionately represented in the homeless youth population because of systemic racism in housing, education, and juvenile justice institutions. For example, Black youth are overrepresented in foster care and more likely to be pushed into homelessness as they age out of the system. Along with that, female and trans youth face heightened risk of violence, exploitation, and barriers to shelter access. These overlaps of identity can limit access to supportive services and increase the likelihood of being turned away from housing programs that don't offer trauma informed or identity affirming care.

== Problem and prevention ==
=== Understanding Homeless Youth Experiences ===
Given the elusive nature of homeless youth and their tendency to go under the radar of official data collection, qualitative studies can help understand the experiences of homeless youth populations through interviews and observations. A study of Youth Experiencing Homelessness (YEH) in San Francisco, California, compiled data on YEH experiences and recommendations for policy changes. A total of 45 interviews were conducted with YEH, ranging from 15 to 24 years of age, who experienced at least one night of homelessness six months prior to being interviewed. During the interviews, YEH described having trouble accessing basic resource accommodations, housing, trauma therapy, ADA accommodations, and educational resources. When the study was conducted, many of the resources available for these youth populations in San Francisco were difficult to access as various agencies provided different services. YEH suggested that expanded hours of operation or trauma-informed service training might help alleviate negative experiences with the agencies.

Transition-aged youth, ages 16 to 25, who misuse substances often experience extreme hardship in the time leading up to homelessness. Factors contributing to youth homelessness include adverse life events, out-of-home placement, incarceration, childhood trauma, physical abuse, sexual abuse, sexual assault, and death of a parent. A study found that the service needs of transition-aged youth engaged in substance misuse were not satisfied. Stakeholders described long waiting lists for housing and trouble finding employment. Many homeless youths are mentally and physically unstable. For example, one stakeholder described the difficulty getting patients who self-medicate to seek clinical help and treatment for psychosis. Clinics often refuse services to self-medicating users out of fear of prescribing substance related issues. Mental disorders found to be most prevalent were depression, anxiety, bipolar disorder, and psychotic disorders. The stigma that youth hold of behavioral health services makes it difficult to provide aid; it is often the case that youth in need of behavioral health services do not seek help.

Stigmatization around homeless youth populations can slow assistance. In a study conducted on street children of Latin America, many children interviewed referenced themselves with disparaging comments, yet demonstrated desire and hope for a better future. In a study on Canadian youth homelessness, 73.9% of homeless youth school drop-outs stated that they hope to someday complete their education.

Efforts to understand and prevent youth homelessness are complicated because of inconsistencies in how it is defined and measured across agencies. Different government programs use varying definitions of both "homeless" and "youth," which can lead to the exclusion of large numbers of young people from official statistics and services. For example, youth who are couch surfing or staying temporarily with others are often not counted in federal data collection efforts. Along with that, the most common national method, the annual "Point in Time" count, counts the homeless based on the headcount from a singular night, typically in the winter, that often misses youth who avoid shelters or do not appear visibly homeless. These limitations create barriers to accurately measuring the youth homeless population and as a result limit efficiency for policy responses and resource allocation.

Government efforts to support homeless youth include the McKinney-Vento Act (1987), which makes sure people have access to public education by providing transportation and removing enrollment barriers for students without stable housing. However, long term challenges persist because of historical federal disinvestment, like the Reagan administration cuts in the 1980s that reduced subsidized housing funds by over 80%, contributing greatly to the rise of youth homelessness. More recently, Housing First policies set in place have prioritized more immediate housing access without preconditions, but some researchers say these models don't fully address the trauma, developmental stages and identity related needs of youth.

=== Prevention strategies ===
The New Opportunities Prevention Strategy is a national strategy to prevent youth homelessness developed by researchers at the University of Chicago. The research group there has developed a protocol for addressing youth homelessness with four levels of prevention categorized by effectiveness and ease of implementation. Their findings show that the most effective way to aid youth homelessness is to introduce policies that preventatively intervene in the lives of youth prior to them becoming homeless. Providing housing, direct cash transfers, and increased access to quality resources and support are viable prevention strategies. The group proposes policy actions for greater investment from all levels of government in housing supply and increasing the low-income housing tax credit. Preventing recurrence is the most difficult prevention strategy to implement.

The Pathways to Success Model Intervention was developed to aid youth exiting foster care and prevent homelessness — a transition that is often tumultuous. Pathways was implemented in three counties in Colorado to reach a large demographic: one urban, one suburban, and one rural county were selected. The methodology of Pathways is built on the idea of a navigator-youth relationship. The navigator is a service provider who provides coach-like engagement to develop a positive relationship with the youth, originating from Co-Active Life Coaching (CALC) theory. The relationship between the Navigator and youth is shaped by four core principles:

1. The assertion that people are inherently resourceful and capable of making choices, taking action, and learning.
2. A focus on the youth as a whole person rather than a problem to solve.
3. To stay present in the moment.
4. To maintain a vision of the possibility of transformation.

Youth between the ages of 14 and 21 with child welfare experience and additional risk factors for homelessness were qualified to be participants; participants were enrolled into the Pathways program between July 2016 and September 2019. By analyzing pre and post-intervention surveys it was concluded that 40% of all post-test respondents secured housing; youth reporting as homeless dropped from 37% (pre-test) to 10% (post-test). Employment and finance metrics were tracked. From pre-test to post-test the average monthly income increased from US$627.00 to US$1,052.00 demonstrating the success of the program. Part-time employment increased by 4% and full-time employment increased by 10%. Findings indicate that youth-driven, coach-like engagement is effective in reducing homelessness for youth coming out of the foster care system.

==== Early intervention ====
Research has explored whether direct financial support could reduce homelessness among young people leaving care. A 2026 trial in England tested the effect of providing a one-off, unconditional cash payment of £2,000 to care leavers aged 18-25. The study found that participants who received the payment were more likely to report stable housing after six months, and less likely to report sofa surfing, than those in the comparison group. The study also reported improvements in measure of wellbeing.

==== Education ====
Education is instrumental in reducing youth homelessness. In a Canadian study examining Youth Homelessness, it reported that there are over 35,000 youth who are classified to be homeless within Canada's borders. Preventative Measures to avoid youth falling into homelessness are essential, and can begin at school. Access and distribution of services and recognition of at-risk children begin at school. If prevention is not established in the school system, the likelihood of homeless youth completing their high school education decreases drastically. In 2016, in a study conducted on homeless Canadian Youth, 53.2% had dropped out of school.

Prevention efforts may also benefit from expanding access to community-based programs that provide holistic support, or approaches that combine educational assistance with services like mentorship, creative expression, housing support, and financial stipends that can help broader needs of vulnerable youth.

== See also ==
- Youth Homelessness Matters Day
